= Battle of Guam (1944) =

WWII battle in the Pacific theater between US and Japan

- Part of the Mariana and Palau Islands campaign of the Pacific Theater (World War II)
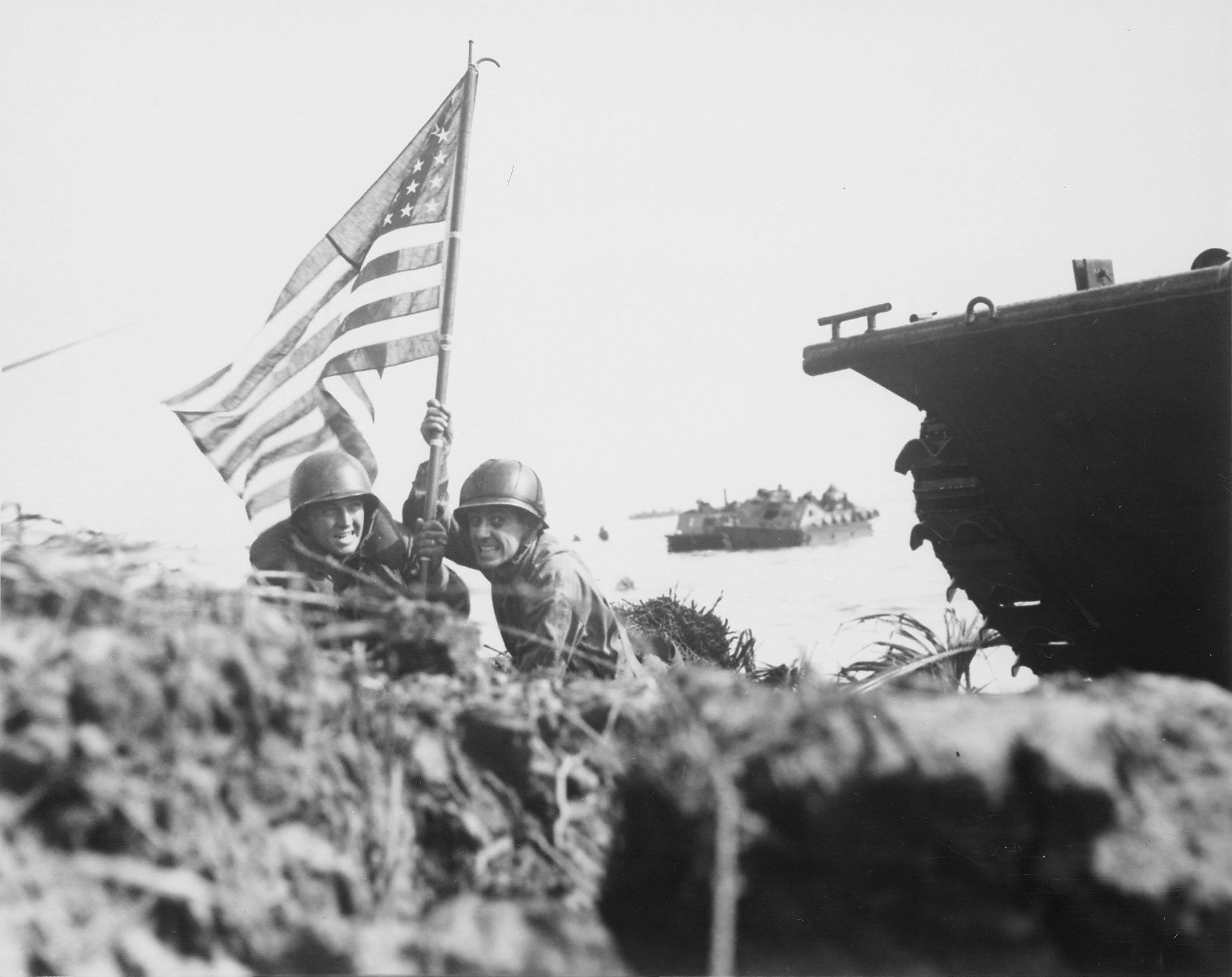
- U.S. Army officers planting the American flag
Date	21 July – 10 August 1944 (2 weeks and 6 days)
Location	Japanese-occupied Guam 13°24′10″N 144°39′47″E
Result	American victory
Territorial changes	The United States recaptured Guam from Japan

Belligerents
United States	Japan

Commanders and leaders
Richard L. Conolly; Roy Geiger; Allen H. Turnage; Andrew D. Bruce; Lemuel C. Shepherd Jr.	Takeshi Takashina †; Hideyoshi Obata ‡‡

Units involved
III Amphibious Corps; 3rd Marine Division; 77th Infantry Division; 1st Provisional Marine Brigade	Thirty-First Army; 29th Division; 48th Independent Mixed Brigade; 10th Independent Mixed Regiment

Strength
Navy and Marines: 37,292; Army: 19,245; Total: 65,787	Army: 11,500; Navy: 5,000; Air: 2,000; Total: 18,500

Casualties and losses
Marines: 1,567 dead, 5,308 wounded; Army: 177 dead, 662 wounded; Navy 16 killed, 42 wounded; Total: 1,760 dead, 6,012 wounded (by 10 August 1944)	18,377 dead, 1,250 captured (by 31 August 1945)
- 600+ civilians killed

Map of the battle

The Battle of Guam (21 July – 10 August 1944) was the American recapture of the Japanese-held island of Guam, an American territory in the Mariana Islands captured by the Japanese in the First Battle of Guam in 1941 during the Pacific campaign of World War II. The battle was a critical component of Operation Forager. The recapture of Guam and the broader Mariana and Palau Islands campaign resulted in the destruction of much of Japan's naval air power and allowed the United States to establish large airbases from which it could bomb the Japanese home islands with its new strategic bomber, the Boeing B-29 Superfortress.

The invasion of Saipan was scheduled for 15 June 1944, with landings on Guam tentatively set for just three days later, but the Battle of the Philippine Sea and stubborn resistance by the unexpectedly large Japanese garrison on Saipan led to the invasion of Guam being postponed for over a month. On 21 July, American forces landed on both sides of the Orote Peninsula on the western side of Guam, planning to secure Apra Harbor. The 3rd Marine Division landed at Asan near Agana to the north of Orote, and the 1st Provisional Marine Brigade landed near Agat to the south. The Marines at the two beachheads were pinned down by heavy Japanese fire, making initial progress inland quite slow. Supply was very difficult; landing ships could not come closer than the reef, several hundred yards from the beach, and amphibious vehicles were scarce.

The 1st Provisional Brigade blocked off the Orote Peninsula on 25 July, and that night the Japanese counterattacked, in coordination with an attack against the 3rd Marine Division to the north. The effort was a failure. On 28 July the two beachheads were linked, and by 29 July the Americans had secured the Orote peninsula. The Japanese counterattacks against the beachheads and the fierce fighting beforehand had exhausted them. By the start of August, they were running out of food and ammunition, and they had only a handful of tanks left. They withdrew from southern Guam, planning to make a stand in the mountainous central and northern part of the island, and to engage in a delaying action.

The Marines and the Army's 77th Infantry Division overran the rest of the island. Rain and thick jungle made conditions difficult for the Americans, but after an engagement with the main Japanese line of defense around Mount Barrigada from 2 to 4 August, the Japanese line collapsed. On 10 August organized Japanese resistance ended, and Guam was declared secure, but 7,500 Japanese soldiers were estimated to still be at large.

== Geography ==
Guam, at 225 square miles (580 km^{2}), is the largest of the Mariana Islands, larger than the other fourteen major islands combined. It is 32 miles (51 km) long from north to south, with a width ranging from 4 to 10 miles (6.4 to 16.1 km) at different points of the island. Along with the other Mariana Islands, Guam was claimed for Spain by Miguel López de Legazpi on 26 January 1565. It became a United States possession after its capture from Spain in June 1898 during the Spanish-American War. Two months later, Spain ceded Guam and the Philippines to the United States for $20 million (equivalent to about $800 million in 2025), and the island became an unincorporated territory. The island was captured by the Japanese on 10 December 1941, following the attack on Pearl Harbor that brought the United States into World War II.

The island is surrounded by coral reefs varying from 20 to 700 yards (18 to 640 m) wide. The northern coastline is fringed with 100-to-600-foot (30 to 183 m) cliffs. Beyond is a limestone plateau, broken up by three hills, Mounts Barrigada, Santa Rosa and Machanao. The southern part of the island is also fringed with reefs and cliffs, but there are breaks in the reefs and the cliffs are lower. The highest peak is Mount Lamlam near the south west coast. Running north of it are Mount Alifan, Tenjo, Chachao and Aluyom. The best beaches lie in between, around Apra Harbor and Agat Bay.

Before the war, the harbor was used by United States Navy and PanAm seaplanes; there were no airfields before the Japanese occupation. The Japanese built a 4,500-foot (1,400 m) airfield on the Orote Peninsula, and a 5,000-foot (1,500 m) airfield east of the capital Agana was nearing completion in July 1944. Work on a third airfield at Dededo had not progressed any further than the area being cleared and staked out. The average temperature was about 87 °F (31 °C) and humidity was 90 percent, with daily rainfall during the rainy season that usually ran from July to November. In these months, the unpaved roads became all but impassable. Typhoons were not an annual occurrence, but could be devastating; a typhoon in 1900 destroyed most of the crops on the island, and Guam had not fully recovered from a typhoon in 1940.

The population of Guam in 1941 was about 23,400, of whom 21,500 were Chamorro people, the indigenous people of the Mariana Islands, who were United States nationals, but not citizens. The garrison consisted of 400 United States Marine Corps and Navy personnel. Most of the population, about 12,500 people, lived in Agana. On 10 December 1941, just days after the outbreak of the Pacific War, the Japanese invaded Guam. After a short battle, the garrison surrendered. The Americans on Guam were taken to Japan. The diplomats and five Navy nurses were repatriated to the United States in August 1942; the rest remained prisoners of war for the duration. Six American sailors initially evaded capture; five were found and executed, but one, George Tweed, remained at large.

The Chamorro population suffered considerably during the Japanese occupation of Guam. When it became clear the island would soon be invaded, Japanese soldiers committed numerous atrocities. For security reasons, they forcibly relocated most of the island's population to internment camps in eastern and southern Guam, most notably Manenggon, which lacked food, shelter or sanitation. This saved them from the American preliminary bombardment of the island, although that was not the intent.

== Strategy ==
=== American ===
After World War I, the United States had developed a series of contingency plans for the event of a war with Japan known as the Orange plans. These envisaged an advance through the Marshall and Caroline Islands to the Philippines, from whence Japan could be blockaded. The Mariana Islands figured only incidentally in the plans, as they lay north of the direct route between Hawaii and the Philippines. During World War II, the islands attracted the attention of naval and air strategists. At the Casablanca Conference in January 1943, the US and British Combined Chiefs of Staff endorsed a Central Pacific offensive along the lines envisaged in the Orange plans. In his formulation of a Pacific strategy, the Commander in Chief, United States Fleet, Admiral Ernest J. King, specifically mentioned the Mariana Islands as "the key to the situation because of their location on the Japanese line of communication."

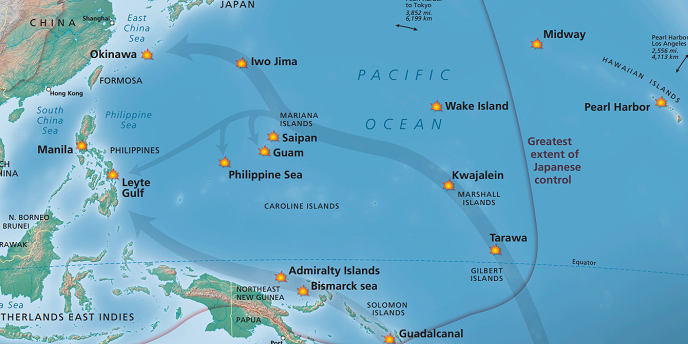
Pacific Theater of World War II

King envisaged the Marianas primarily as a naval base, especially for submarines, but another rationale for their capture emerged with the development of the long-range Boeing B-29 Superfortress bomber. From the Mariana Islands, B-29s could reach the most significant industrial targets in Japan, and the air staff planners began incorporating the islands into their long-range plans in September 1943. Commander in Chief, Pacific Ocean Areas (CINCPOA), Admiral Chester W. Nimitz, produced a campaign plan called Operation Granite, which tentatively scheduled the capture of the Mariana Islands of Saipan, Tinian and Guam for 15 November 1944.

By February 1944, there was consideration of advancing the timetable by bypassing Truk and heading directly for Palau or the Marianas after the capture of the Marshall Islands. On 7 March, Nimitz and his Deputy Chief of Staff, Rear Admiral Forrest P. Sherman, met with the Joint Chiefs of Staff in Washington, D.C., where they were questioned by the Chief of Staff of the United States Army, General George C. Marshall, and the Chief of Staff to the Commander in Chief, Admiral William D. Leahy. Sherman argued the neutralization of Truk required the occupation of the Mariana Islands to cut the air route to Truk from Japan. On 12 March, the Joint Chiefs directed Nimitz to neutralize Truk and occupy the Mariana Islands, with a target date of 15 June 1944.

Although Saipan and Tinian were more suitable as long-range bomber bases, since they were closer to Japan, Guam was the most desirable of the Mariana Islands for a naval base, because it had a more adequate water supply and the best anchorage in Apra Harbor. It was decided to invade Saipan first, though, because aircraft based there could then protect Tinian and Guam from air attacks from Japan staging through the Nanpō Islands. The operation to capture the Marianas was codenamed Operation Forager; Guam was codenamed "Stevedore".

=== Japanese ===
On 30 September 1943, the Japanese Imperial War Council established an "Absolute National Defense Zone" that included the Kuril Islands, Bonin Islands, Marianas, Caroline Islands, Western New Guinea, Netherlands East Indies and Burma. Possession of this area was considered vital, as it gave Japan access to interior lines and provided the food and raw materials needed to sustain Japan's war effort. The Army expressed confidence that the national defense zone could be held, but the Chief of the Imperial Japanese Navy General Staff, Admiral Osami Nagano, was much less certain. The Imperial Japanese Navy planned to hold the national defense zone by defeating the United States fleet in a decisive battle.

== Opposing forces ==
=== United States ===
Overall command of the operation was exercised by Nimitz through the commander of the Fifth Fleet, Admiral Raymond A. Spruance. Under Spruance was the commander of the Joint Expeditionary Force (Task Force 51), Vice Admiral Richmond K. Turner; and the commander of the Expeditionary Troops (Task Force 56), Lieutenant General Holland M. Smith. Task Force 51 was divided into the Northern Attack Force (Task Force 52), under Turner, which would land and support the troops on Saipan and Tinian, and the Southern Attack Force (Task Force 53), under Rear Admiral Richard L. Conolly, the commander of Amphibious Group 3, which would land and support the troops on Guam. In addition to the two defense battalions, Brigadier General Pedro Augusto del Valle's III Amphibious Corps Artillery had the 1st and 2nd 155 mm Howitzer Battalions and the 7th 155 mm Gun Battalion. A Marine Corps observation squadron, VMO-1, was also assigned.

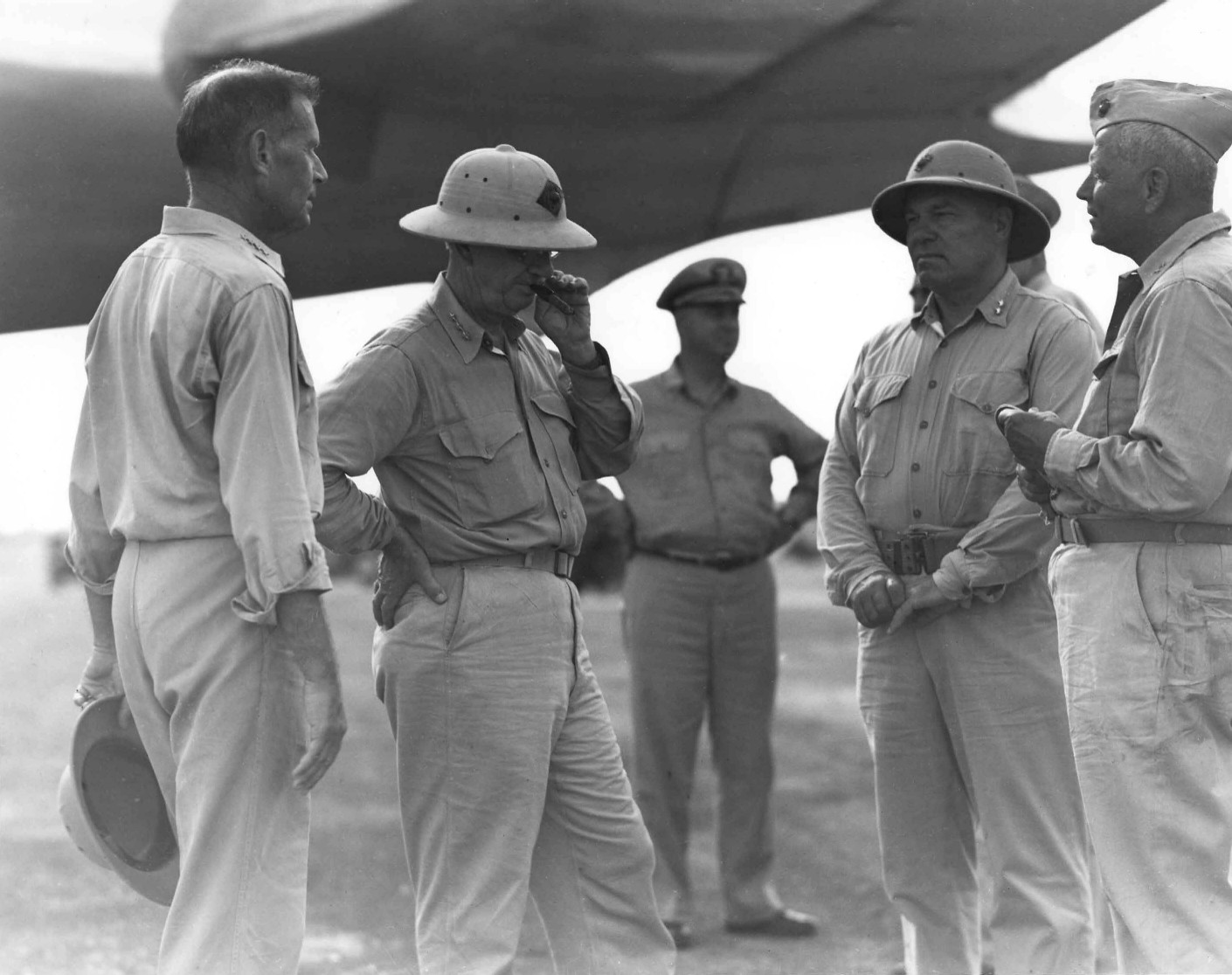
Senior Navy and Marine Corps commanders. Left to right: Admiral Raymond A. Spruance, Lieutenant General Holland M. Smith, Rear Admiral Richard L. Conolly, Major General Henry L. Larsen and Major General Roy S. Geiger

In Nimitz's preliminary order of 20 March 1944, the task of recapturing Guam was assigned to Major General Roy S. Geiger's I Marine Amphibious Corps, which was renamed the III Amphibious Corps on 15 April. For this operation, Geiger had the 3rd Marine Division, the 1st Provisional Marine Brigade and the 9th and 14th Defense Battalions. The 3rd Marine Division was commanded by Major General Allen H. Turnage. The 1st Provisional Marine Brigade was activated at Pearl Harbor on 22 March, and Brigadier General Lemuel C. Shepherd Jr. assumed command on 16 April. The brigade was built around the 4th Marine Regiment on Emirau and the 22nd Marine Regiment, which was in the Marshall Islands; both were ordered to move to Guadalcanal. The 27th Infantry Division was designated the reserve for both the Northern and Southern Attack Forces. The Pacific Ocean Areas reserve was the 77th Infantry Division, which was still in the United States, but under orders to move to Hawaii.

Geiger's headquarters was on Guadalcanal in the Solomon Islands, so he flew to Pearl Harbor on 29 March with members of his staff to confer with Spruance, Turner, Smith and Conolly. The plan they drew up, Operation Plan (OpPlan) 1-44, was approved by Smith on 3 April and Turner and Spruance the following day. It called for simultaneous landings on either side of the Orote Peninsula, with a northern attack group commanded by Conolly landing the 3rd Marine Division between Adelup Point and the Tatgua River, while a southern attack group under Rear Admiral Lawrence F. Reifsnider landed the 1st Provisional Marine Brigade on the beaches between Agat and Bangi Point. The vital Orote Peninsula and Apra Harbor area would be seized by a double envelopment. That the area was likely to be heavily defended was not overlooked, but in the Battle of Munda Point the tactic of landing elsewhere and fighting through the jungle to the objective had proved to be both slow and costly. Geiger returned to Guadalcanal on 7 April, and Conolly joined him there eight days later, co-locating his headquarters with Geiger's until the command ship USS Appalachian arrived from Pearl Harbor on 27 April.

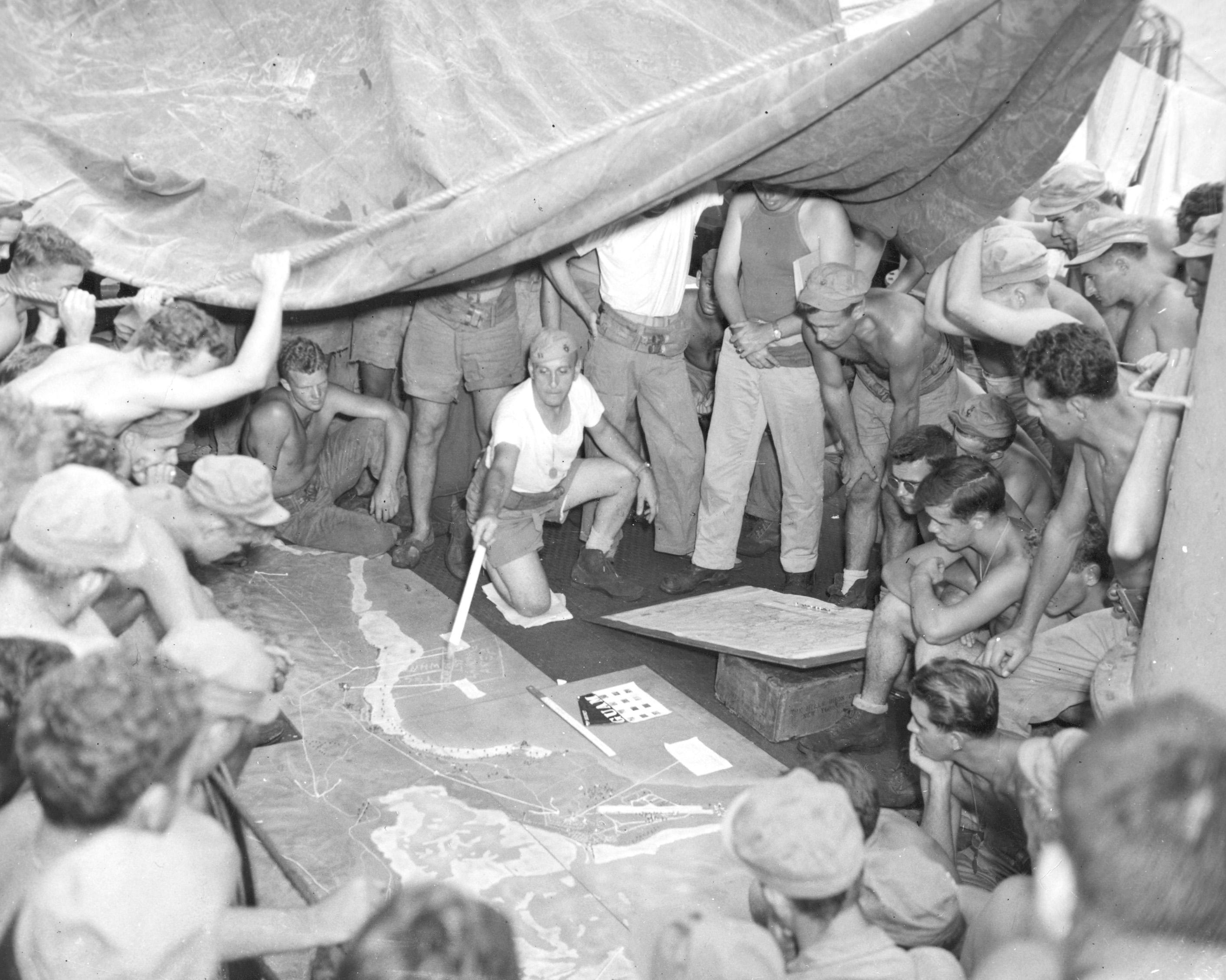
Marines of the pack Howitzer Battalion aboard an LST study a relief map of the area on Guam on which they are to land. Captain Phillip P. Santon, Battalion Intelligence Officer, aids the lecture.

In addition to the main plan, two alternative plans were developed to cover the contingencies where one of the beaches was found to be too heavily defended or otherwise unsuitable. OpPlan 3-44 provided for landing the entire force in the south between Agat and Facpi Point, while OpPlan 4-44 provided for the 1st Provisional Marine Brigade to land further south, between Bangi and Facpi Points. The landing date, codenamed W-Day to avoid confusion with Saipan's D-Day, was tentatively set for 18 June, three days after the landing on Saipan.

Considering that Guam had been an American possession for over forty years, the quality of information available to the American forces about Guam was poor. The Office of Naval Intelligence compiled a 345-page study that was issued in February 1944. The 1:20,000 map issued to the troops contained many broken contour lines, indicating the area had not been properly surveyed, and the location of roads and tracks, particularly in northern Guam, was frequently inaccurate. Areas marked bare on the maps turned out to be densely forested, and many low hills were not marked. The Japanese defenders had better maps. Aerial photography was undertaken in April, May and June, but persistent cloud cover left many gaps. Offshore, there was uncertainty about how sharply the reefs dropped off on the seaward side. In April, the submarine USS Greenling took a series of oblique images of the beaches. Plaster 1:5000 relief maps with a 2:1 vertical exaggeration of the beach areas were also prepared. When Conolly issued his operation plan for the assault on 17 May, US intelligence estimated there were between 6,900 and 9,300 Japanese troops of Guam, of whom 2,000 to 2,600 were in airfield construction units.

=== Japanese ===
For most of the period of the Japanese occupation, the garrison on Guam consisted of the 150 sailors of the 54th Keibitai (garrison). In September 1943, indications of an impending American assault on the Gilbert Islands led to a reconsideration of the defense of the island. Although the Japanese high command believed Palau in the Caroline Islands would be the Americans' next target, Japanese civilians were evacuated from Guam, and steps were taken to reinforce the garrison. The 13th Division, which had been serving in China since 1937, was ordered to Guam. An advance party of 300 sailed for Guam in October 1943, but the main body of the division never followed, as it was diverted to participate in Operation Ichi-Go in southern China.

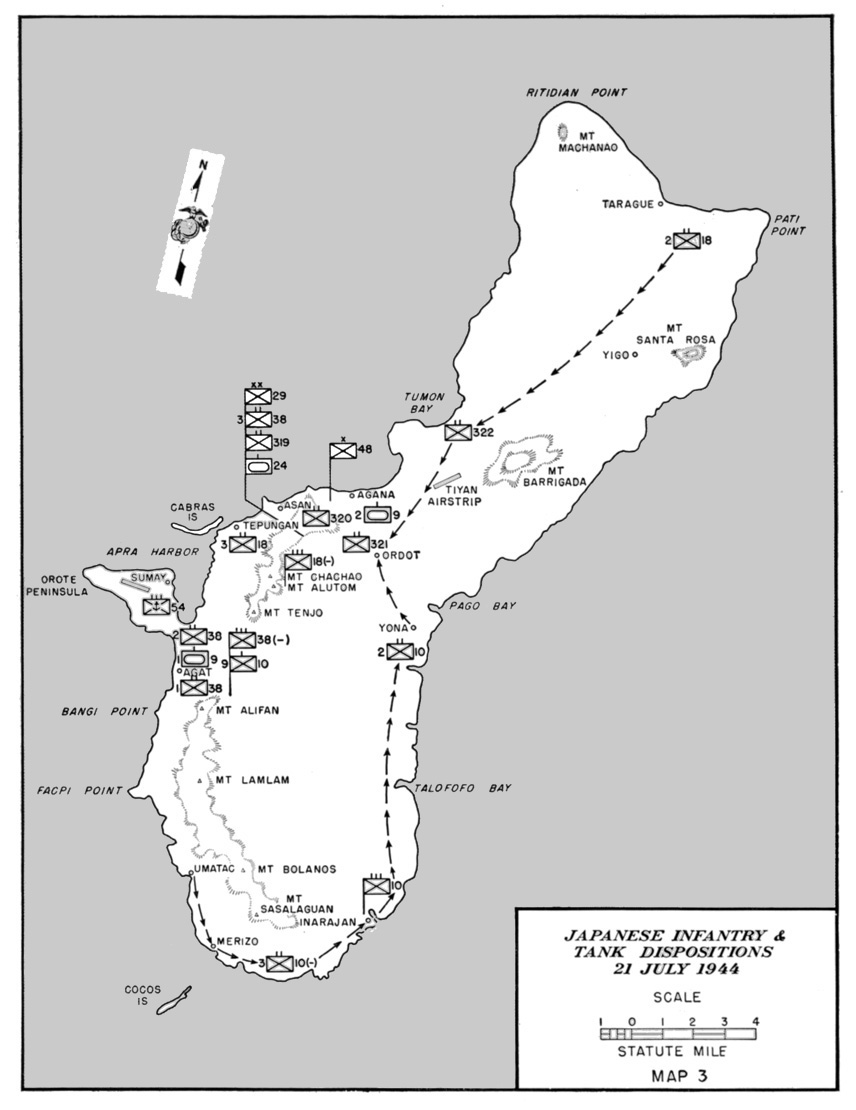
Japanese infantry and tank dispositions on Guam, 21 July 1944

In February 1944, the 29th Division in Manchuria, under the command of Lieutenant General Takeshi Takashina, was ordered to the Marianas. It embarked from Korea in three ships on 24 February. En route, the Sakito Maru, carrying 4,124 troops, including the division's 18th Infantry Regiment, was torpedoed and sunk by the American submarine USS Trout on 29 February. The destroyers escorting the convoy depth charged Trout, which went down with all hands, and took the 1,620 survivors to Saipan. The 1st Battalion remained there; the rest of the regiment, under the command of Colonel Hiko-Shiro Ohashi, continued on to Guam, eventually arriving there on 4 June. The division's 50th Infantry Regiment went to Tinian, while rest of the division, including Colonel Tsunetara Suenaga's 38th Infantry Regiment, reached Guam on 4 March.

The forces on Guam were further reinforced by the 6th Expeditionary Force, which embarked from Pusan with 4,700 soldiers of the Kwantung Army's 1st and 11th Divisions. It arrived on Guam on 20 March, where the three battalions of the 11th Division became four battalions (numbered 319th to 322nd) of the 48th Independent Mixed Brigade, under the command of Major General Kiyoshi Shigematsu, and those of 1st Division became the 10th Independent Mixed Regiment, under the command of Colonel Ichiro Kataoka. In June, the 1st Battalion, 10th Mixed Regiment, was sent to Rota. The 3rd Battalion, 38th Infantry Regiment, was also sent there, to make a counter-landing on Saipan, but sea conditions rendered this impossible, and it returned to Guam on 29 June.

The 54th Keibitai was steadily reinforced with coast defence and anti-aircraft units until it reached a strength of about 2,300 in July 1944. It was under Captain Yutaka Sugimoto, the former island commander. In addition, there were two setsueitai (naval construction battalions), the 217th and 218th, totaling 1,080 personnel, sent to work on the airfields, but were available for employment in combat. In total, there was about 5,000 naval ground troops and 2,000 more in naval air units. Takashina was in command, although his superior, Lieutenant General Hideyoshi Obata, the commander of the Thirty-First Army, who had overall responsibility for the defense of the Mariana Islands, was also on Guam, having been waylaid while returning from Palau to his headquarters on Saipan when the Americans invaded that island.

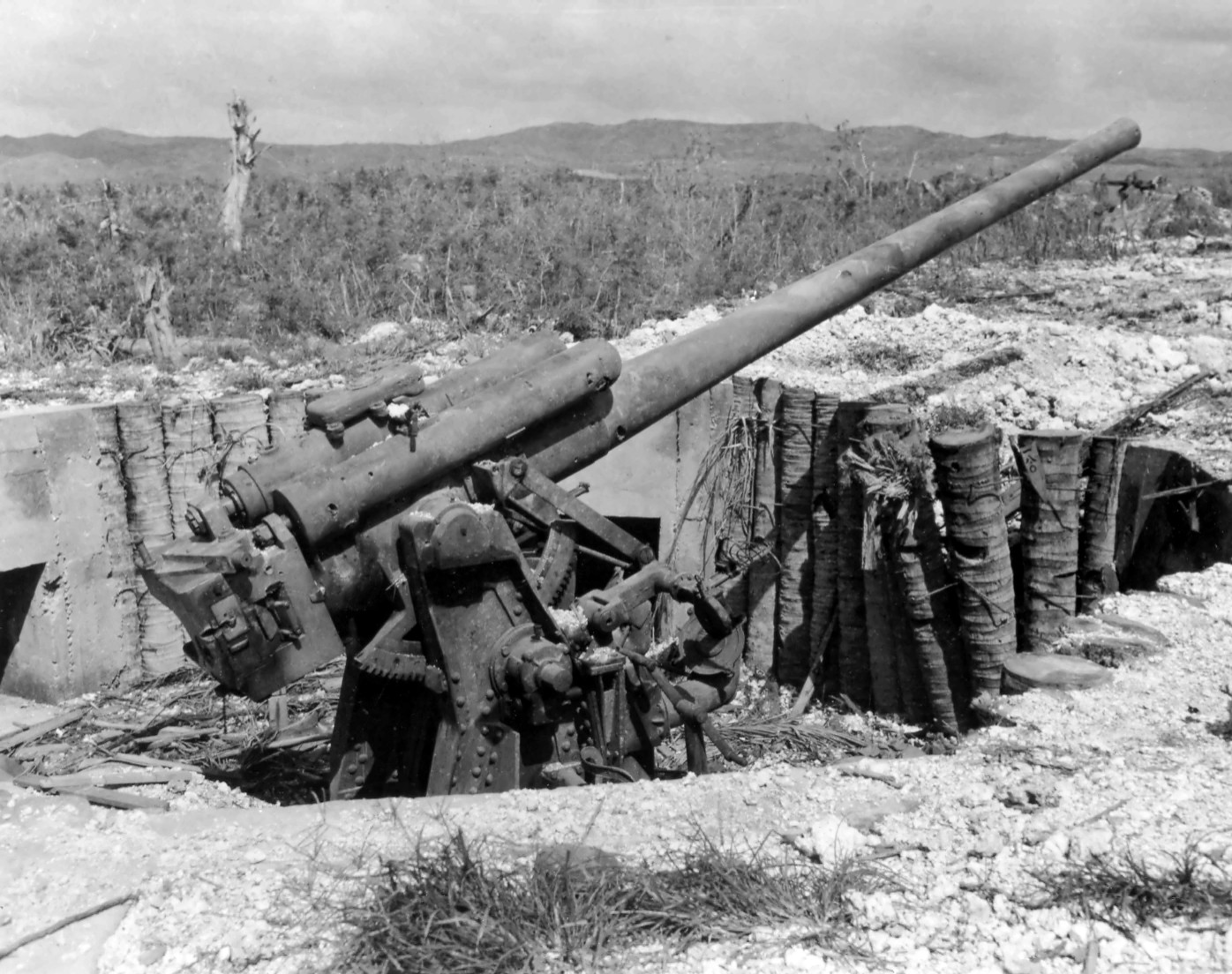
One gun of a 4-gun Japanese dual purpose 120 mm battery on hill east of the Orote Peninsula airfield. Revetments 21 feet (6.4 m) in diameter and 6 feet (1.8 m) deep. A two-inch (51 mm) pipe served as a speaking tube communicating from the command post to the guns.

Takashina positioned most of his troops to protect the airfields and Apra Harbor. The 48th Independent Mixed Brigade was around Agana, with 320th Battalion manning the defenses between Adelup Point and Tumon Bay, the 321st around Agana Bay, and the 322nd around Tumon Bay. The 319th Battalion was held in reserve east of Agana. Takashina placed most of his artillery in this sector, at the disposal of the 48th Independent Mixed Brigade. Naval troops were located around Agana, and Takashina established his headquarters on the Fonte Plateau. The Agat sector was held by the 38th Infantry Regiment, the 54th Keibitai and the 755th Air Group, re-roled as a ground combat unit. Since Takashina could not be certain where the Americans intended to land, other units were deployed around the rest of the island. By early July, he was certain the landing would be on the west coast, so he moved these units there to build up the defenses.

Takashina kept his armor in reserve. The nine light tanks of the 24th Tank Company were inland at Ordot. The 2nd Company, 9th Tank Regiment, with between 12 and 14 tanks, mostly mediums, was in support of the 48th Independent Mixed Brigade. The 1st Company, 9th Tank Regiment, with between 12 and 15 light tanks, was in support of the 38th Infantry Regiment, behind the Agat beaches. In total, there were about 18,500 Japanese troops defending Guam in July 1944.

== Preliminary operations ==
=== The landing is postponed ===
Task Force 53 reached the staging area at Kwajalein on 8 June, and after taking on food, fuel and water, set out for the assembly area east of Saipan, which it reached on 15 June. Carrier aircraft from Task Force 58 attacked Guam on 11 and 12 June, and Rear Admiral Walden L. Ainsworth commenced the preliminary bombardment of the Japanese defenses with the battleships USS Pennsylvania and Idaho, the cruiser USS Honolulu and destroyers. Meanwhile, the unexpectedly large Japanese garrison on Saipan and the stubborn resistance it was putting up forced the commitment of 27th Infantry Division to the Battle of Saipan. This not only deprived the III Amphibious Force of its reserve, it meant the III Amphibious Corps had now become the reserve for the forces on Saipan. Furthermore, the Japanese 1st Mobile Fleet had been detected headed for the Marianas, so a full-scale naval engagement was in prospect. On 16 June, Spruance took the decision to postpone the landing on Guam, and ordered Conolly to take Task Force 53 east, out of harm's way.

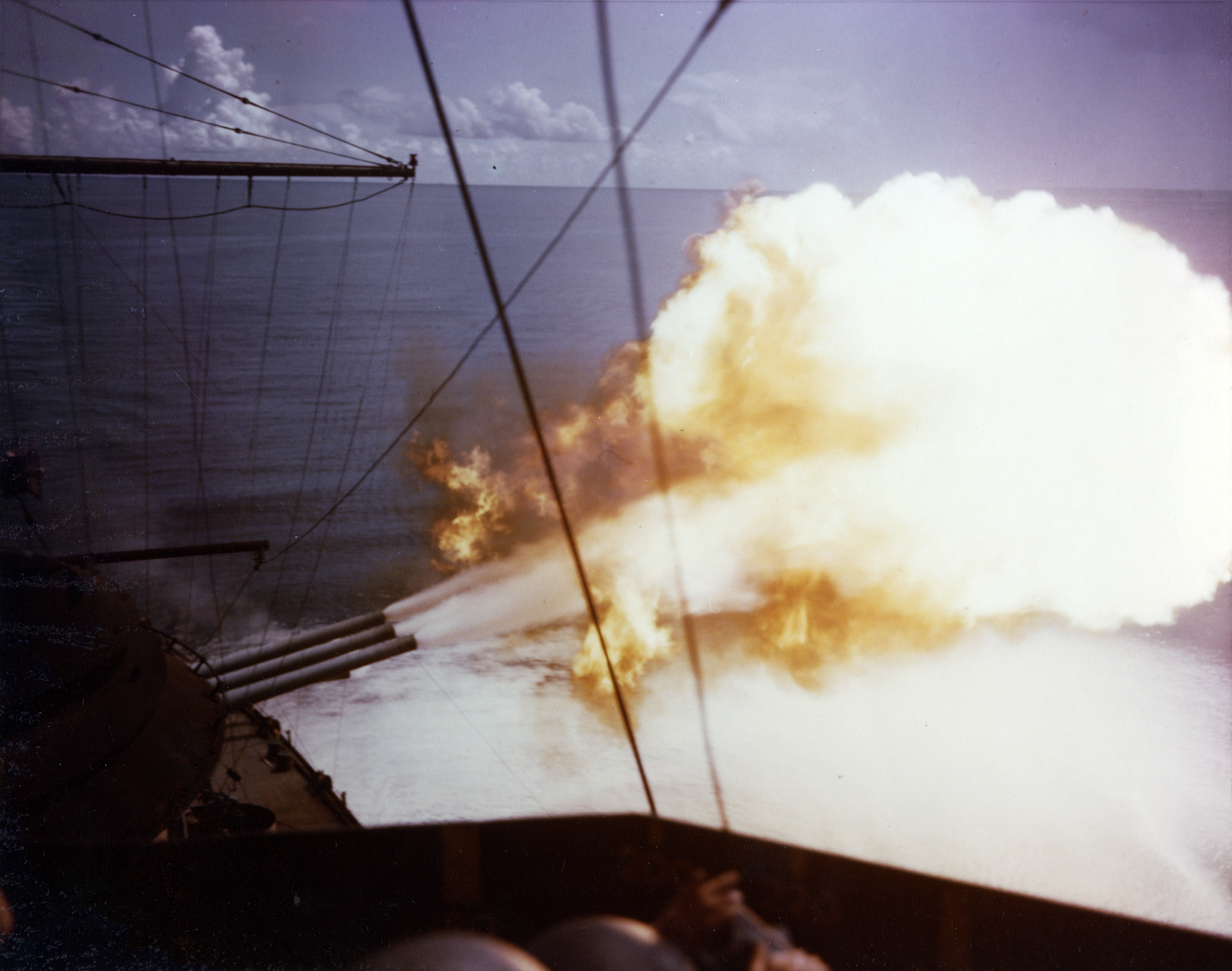
The battleship USS New Mexico fires her guns in the pre-invasion bombardment of Guam.

On 25 June, with the Battle of the Philippine Sea won and the situation ashore greatly improved, the III Amphibious Corps was released from its role as reserve, and the ships carrying the 3rd Marine Division (Task Group 53.1) sailed for Eniwetok; those carrying the 1st Provisional Marine Brigade (Task Group 53.2) followed five days later. On 3 July, Spruance held a conference to decide on a new W-Day. The hard fighting on Saipan foretold more of the same on Guam and intelligence reports based on documents captured on Saipan now gave an accurate assessment of Japanese strength. It was decided that more troops were required.

One regimental combat team, built around the 305th Infantry Regiment, was already on its way, but the conference agreed to postpone the landing until the entire 77th Infantry Division arrived. W-Day was therefore set for 25 July. Neither King nor Nimitz was happy with the delay. It meant the marines had to spend weeks in cramped quarters on transports, with the inevitable loss of physical condition and combat efficiency. In the event, the main body of the 77th Infantry Division arrived at Eniwetok four days early, so W-Day was advanced to 21 July. With the addition of the 77th Infantry Division, there were 37,292 Navy and Marines and 19,245 Army troops bound for Guam, so the American attackers outnumbered the Japanese defenders by roughly 3-to-1.

The revised plan called for the 305th Infantry to land on W-Day when ordered by the 1st Provisional Marine Brigade. The rest of the 77th Infantry Division would be a floating reserve until ordered to land on the same beaches by the III Amphibious Corps. The division commander, Major General Andrew D. Bruce, prepared two alternative plans. One called for the 306th and 307th Infantry Regiments to land near Adelup Point and advance south to Mount Tenjo or southwest to Pago Bay. The other was for a landing on the north coast between Uruno and Ritidian Point. Bruce favored this tactic, and would later use it to great effect in the Battle of Leyte. While the north coast was backed by steep cliffs and dense jungle, the idea was that it would be very lightly defended, and the Japanese would have few reserves to respond. However, the Marines were reluctant to divert the corps reserve fearing it would be needed on the main beachheads, and they believed the Japanese did possess reserves. Geiger ultimately responded that it was too late to change the assault plan, but he did defend Bruce to Smith.

=== Bombardment ===
One consequence of the postponement of W-Day was that it permitted a prolonged air and sea preliminary bombardment, which turned out to be the longest of any island in the Pacific during the war. On 8 July, Rear Admiral C. Turner Joy re-commenced the bombardment with four heavy cruisers, twelve destroyers and the escort carriers USS Corregidor and USS Coral Sea, in coordination with carrier aircraft from Task Force 58. The main targets were coastal defense and anti-aircraft guns, followed by communications, command posts, warehouses and troop concentrations. Over the following days, the battleships USS Pennsylvania, New Mexico, Idaho, Tennessee, California and Colorado joined in.

Conolly, who had already earned himself the nickname "Close-in Conolly" during the Marshall Islands campaign for his insistence on warships conducting shore bombardment from as close to the shoreline as possible, coordinated the effort from Appalachian. Each day, a board of six officers would assign targets based on aerial photographs taken that morning. Geiger was also on board Appalachian and took a close personal interest. In the thirteen days leading up to W-Day, 836 rounds of 16-inch, 5,422 rounds of 14-inch, 3,862 rounds of 8-inch, 2,430 rounds of 6-inch and 16,214 rounds of 5-inch shells pounded the island. In addition, aircraft from Task Forces 53 and 58 dropped 1,131 short tons (1,026 t) of bombs and rockets.

George Ray Tweed, an American who had evaded capture when the island was occupied, was rescued by the destroyer USS McCall on 10 July. Catholic priest and local leader Jesus Baza Dueñas was tortured by Japanese interrogators seeking information on Tweed's whereabouts. Dueñas, his nephew Eduardo, and two other men were beheaded on 12 July. They died without knowing Tweed had already been rescued.

=== Obstacle clearance ===
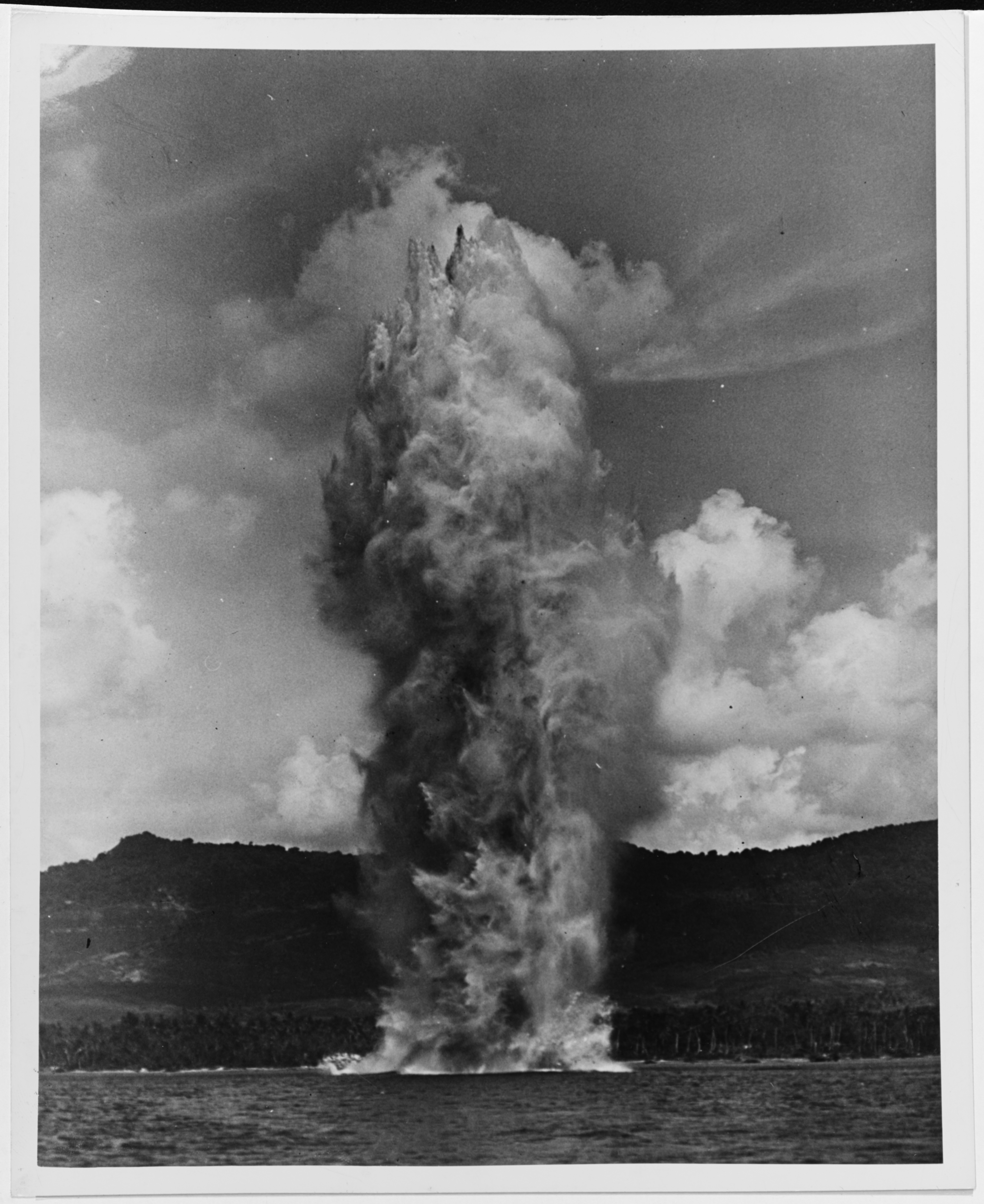
An Underwater Demolition Team (UDT) explosive charge blows up an underwater obstacle off Agat Beach.

Underwater Demolition Team (UDT) 3 arrived off Guam on the high-speed transport USS Dickerson on 16 July and commenced three days and nights of reconnoitering the beaches. In addition to the landing beaches at Agat and Asan, it also conducted surveys of other beaches in order to conceal their intentions from the Japanese. During a daylight reconnaissance of Agat Beach on 15 July, one man was killed by small-arms fire when his landing craft became stuck on a coral head. It was discovered the Japanese beach obstacles consisted of palm log cribs filled with rocks. No land mines were detected, and there was very little barbed wire.

On 17 July, UDT 4 arrived from Guadalcanal on USS Kane and UDT 6 from Eniwetok on USS Clemson. The three teams then began the systematic demolition of the beach obstacles using tetrytol explosives. Some 300 obstacles were removed from the Agat beaches, along with some coral pinnacles blocking a natural channel through the reef to White Beach 1. Another 640 obstacles were blown up at the Asan beaches with 10 short tons (9.1 t) of tetrytol. A Landing Craft Infantry gunboat, LCI(G) 348, one of four providing covering fire and smoke for the UDTs, ran aground 400 to 500 yards (370 to 460 m) off Red Beach 1 and had to pulled off the reef by the fleet tug USS Apache.

=== Ship-to-shore movement ===
On W-Day, 21 July 1944, the fire support ships commenced firing at 05:30. That day, they expended 342 rounds of 16-inch, 1,152 rounds of 14-inch, 1,332 rounds of 8-inch and 13,130 rounds of 5-inch shells, and 9,000 4.5-inch rockets. At 06:15 twelve fighters, nine dive bombers and five torpedo bombers from the aircraft carrier USS Wasp attacked Cabras Island in the first of a series of air strikes by 312 aircraft from Task Force 58 that dropped 124 short tons (112 t) of bombs. The naval bombardment shifted to targets further inland when the troops were 300 yards (270 m) from the beaches, but 44 fighters strafed the beaches until the first troops were nearly ashore.

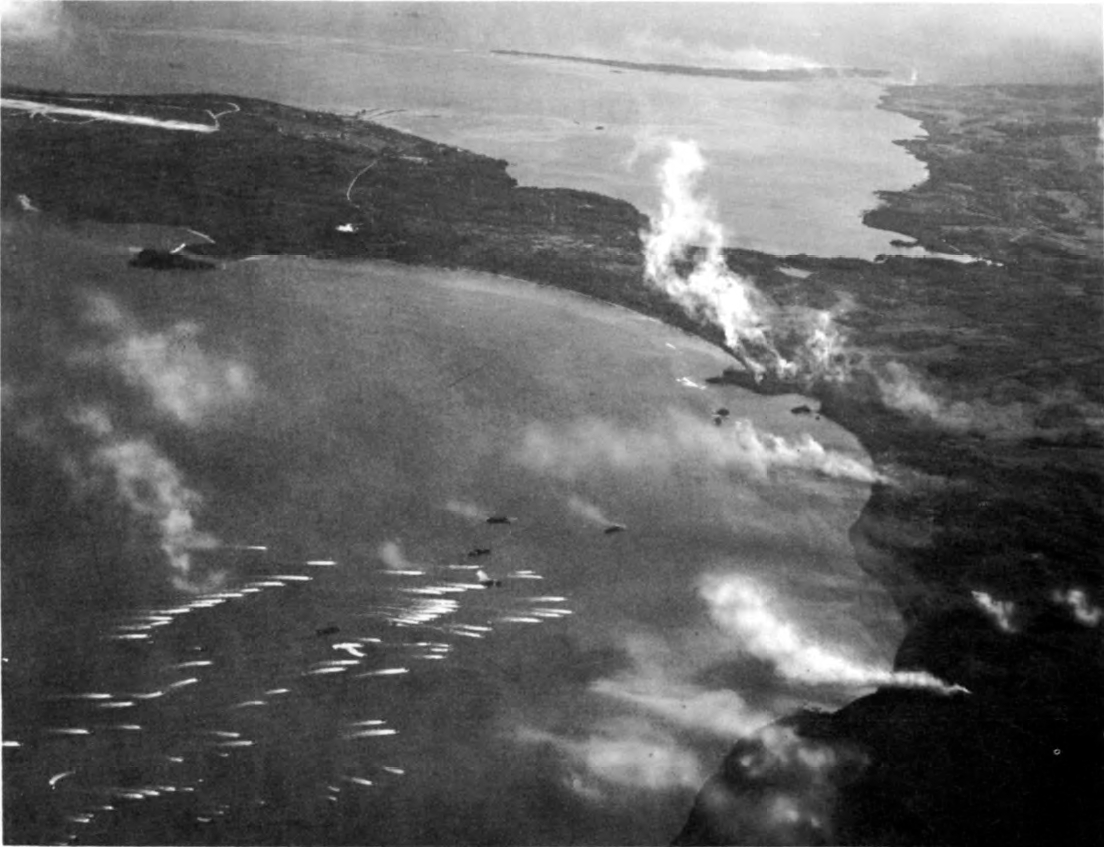
The first wave of landing craft heads for the Agat beaches. Smoke is from the preinvasion naval shelling and aerial bombardment.

The landings followed the same pattern on both the northern and southern beaches. First came nine LCI(G)s that fired 4.5-inch rockets and 20- and 40-mm guns. They were followed by the amphibian tanks (LVT(A)) of the 1st Armored Amphibian Battalion. These were landing vehicles, tracked (LVTs), armed with 37 mm gun M6 or 75 mm howitzer motor carriage M8 turrets. Next came Marines in LVTs launched, like the LVT(A)s, from tank landing ships (LSTs). The LVTs were able to cross the reef and disembark their troops on the beach. Only the first waves of infantry were in LVTs; succeeding waves arrived in assault transports and were loaded onto landing craft, vehicle, personnel (LCVPs) that carried them to the reef, where they transferred to LVTs returning after dropping off earlier waves.

They were followed by tanks. The northern group had two LSDs, USS Epping Forest and Gunston Hall, and the southern group had one, USS Carter Hall. Each LSD carried twenty medium tanks, loaded in a tank landing craft (LCTs) and fourteen mechanized landing craft (LCMs). After them came the artillery. DUKWs carried 105 mm howitzers while LVTs brought 75 mm pack howitzers from the reef. Once the situation on shore stabilized, LSTs nosed up to the reef and began landing vehicles and supplies.

== Northern beachhead ==
=== W-Day at Asan ===
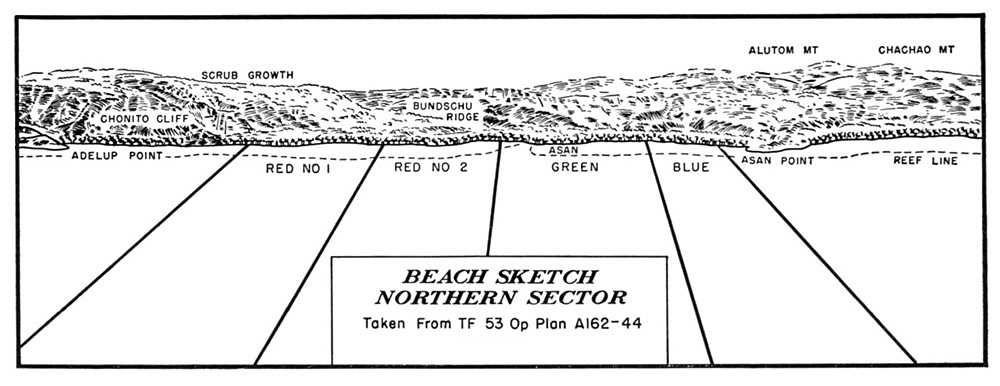
Beach sketch - northern sector

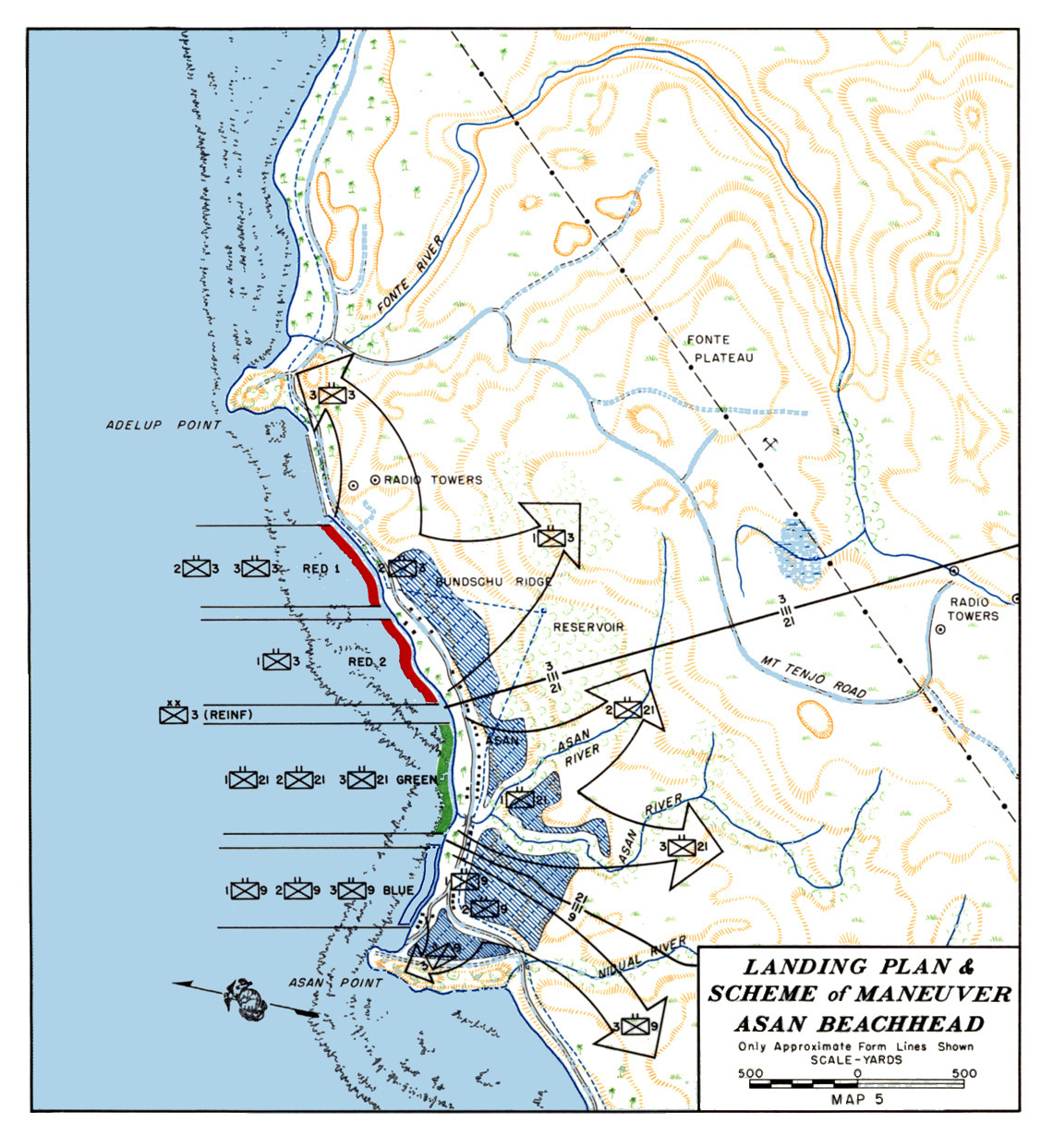
Scheme of maneuver, Asan beachhead

The first LVT(A)s reached the beaches at 08:28, two minutes ahead of schedule. Despite the intense shore bombardment, Japanese mortars and artillery opened up, and nine of the 3rd Marine Division's LVT(A)s and LVTs were knocked out. The 3rd Marine Division's beaches were enfiladed from what the Marines called the "devil's horns" of Adelup Point and Asup Point. The 3rd Marines landed on Red Beaches 1 and 2. The regimental commander, Colonel William C. Hall, hoped to overrun the Japanese positions overlooking the beach before they had a chance to recover from the preliminary bombardment. This hope soon vanished. On the left, the view of the beaches from Adelup Point was obstructed by Chonito Cliff, so the Japanese positions there could fire on the approaching LVTs, but not on the Marines on the beaches. However, Chonito Cliff was a natural strongpoint. Using flamethrowers and assisted by tanks of Company C, 3rd Tank Battalion, that fired directly into the entrances of caves, the 3rd Battalion managed to capture Chonito Cliff by noon and then cleared Adelup Point.

In the center, the 1st Battalion was confronted by Bundschu Ridge, named after the commander of Company A, Captain Geary R. Bundschu, who had been tasked with its capture. The ridge was a rocky outcrop covered with vegetation 400 yards (370 m) high and 200 yards (180 m) square. By 10:45, Bundschu had made it to within 100 yards (91 m) of the ridge top, but his Marines were pinned down by mortar and machine gun fire. Bundschu was wounded and more than half of his Marines were killed or wounded. Hall ordered his 81 mm mortars to concentrate on the ridge and ordered Bundschu to make a second attempt at capturing the ridge before nightfall. Hall later denied ordering a frontal assault, but others present recalled differently. Aided by the 40 mm guns of the 14th Defense Battalion, Company A reached the crest, but could not hold it, and Bundschu was killed in the attempt.

In the meantime, the 12th Marines, the 3rd Marine Division's artillery regiment, began landing at 12:15, and all its 75 mm and 105 mm howitzers were ashore by 16:40, but the range was too short to provide supporting fire on W-Day. The 21st Marines landed on Green Beach and was on its first objective, a moderate height behind the village of Asan, by mid-morning and advanced up the Asan River valley. It encountered less opposition than the other regiments, but was confronted by steep and rugged cliffs covered in scrub and tangled vines. On the right, the 9th Marines landed on Blue Beach, captured Asan Point and crossed the Nidual River. The day's action cost the 3rd Marine Division 105 killed, 536 wounded and 56 missing.

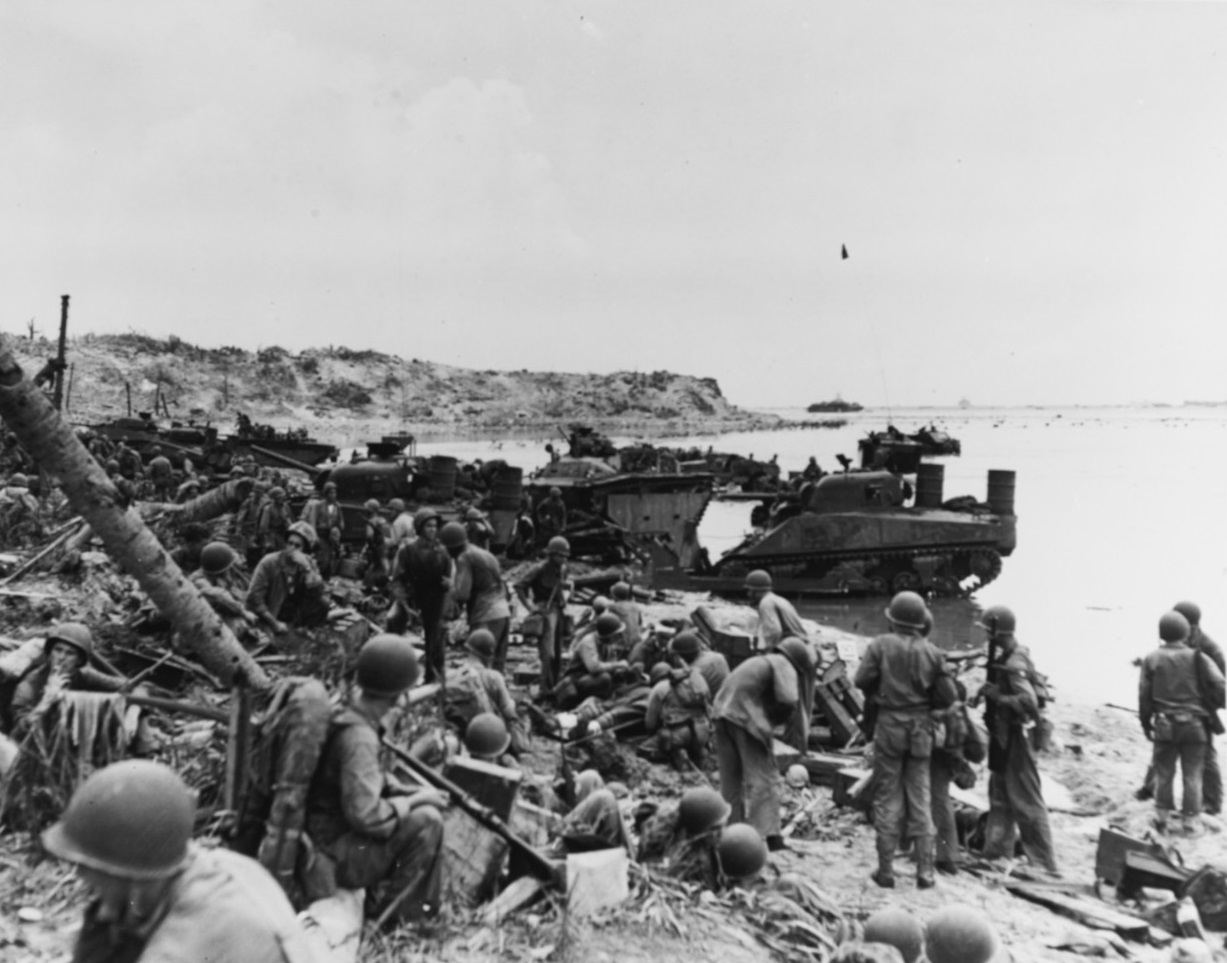
Asan Beach an hour and a half after the first landings. A field dressing station is in operation. Note LVTs and M-4 tanks.

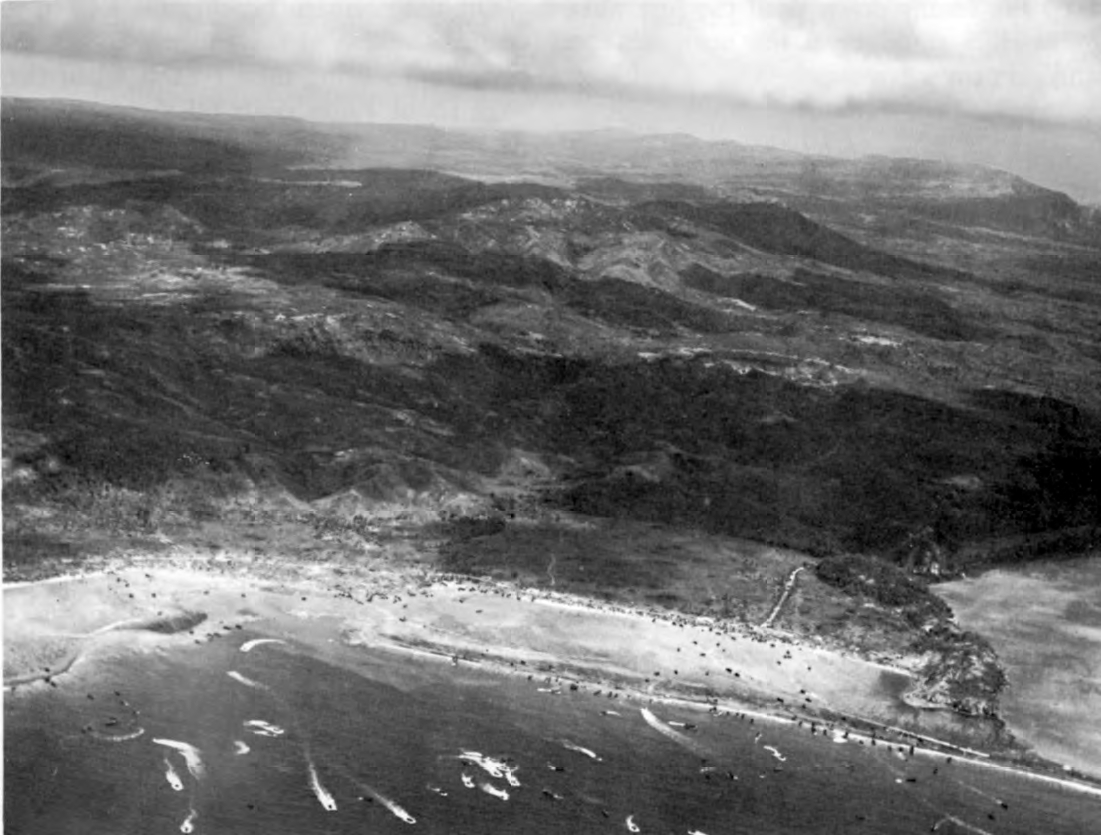
Asan's Green and Blue Beaches stretch from Asan town (left center) to Asan Point (lower right)

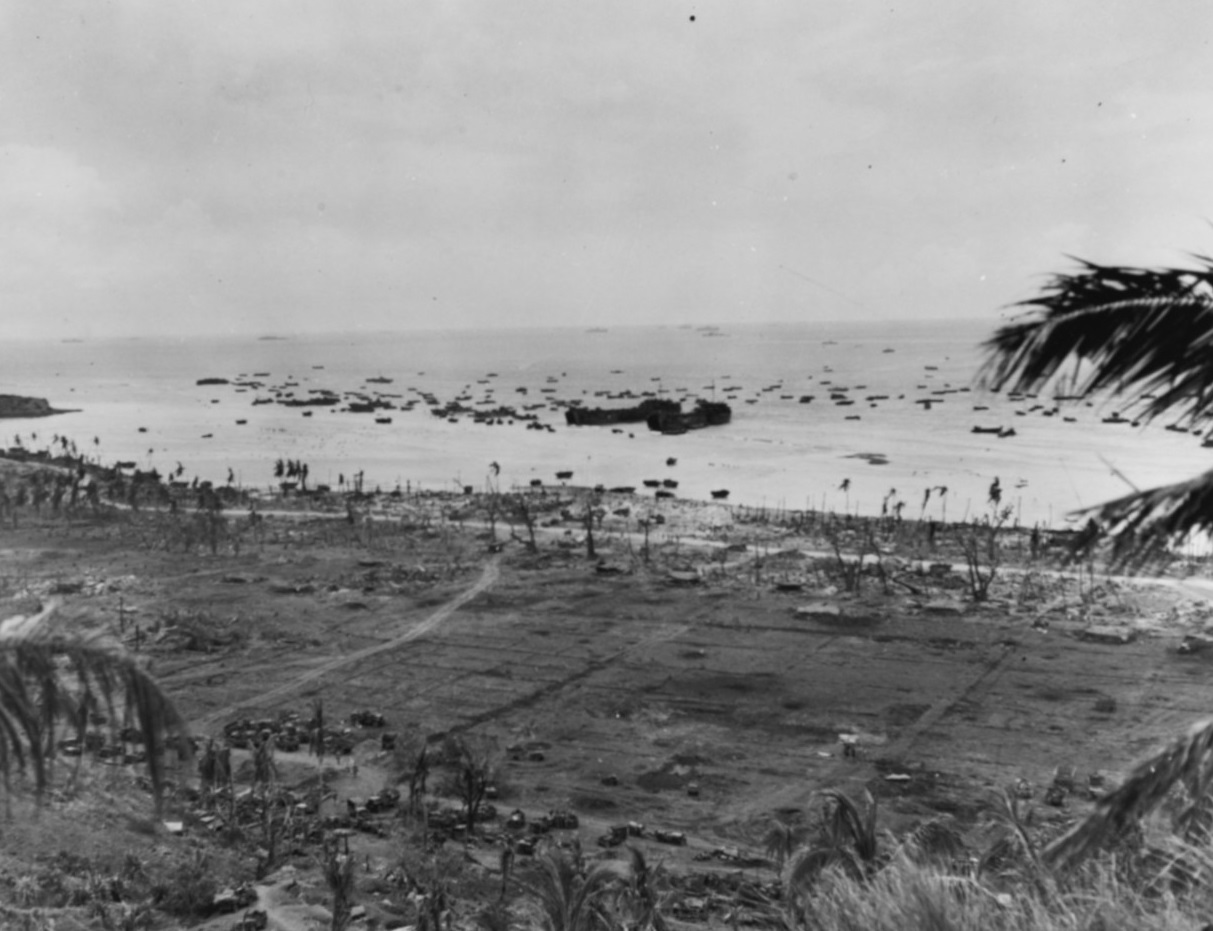
Scene on the Northern Beaches, near Asan Point, 21 July 1944, with two LSTs unloading

=== Consolidation and counter-attacks ===
During the first night, Shigematsu attempted to drive the Marines off the high ground they held using the 2nd Battalion, 18th Infantry Regiment and the 2nd and 3rd Battalions of the 10th Mixed Regiment. Although they inflicted heavy casualties on the Marines, they could not break the American lines. Early the next morning, the 319th and 320th Independent Infantry Battalions attempted to recover Adelup Point and Chonito Cliff, but were unsuccessful. The counterattacks disrupted American plans on the left, and efforts to gain Bundschu Ridge failed. The 3rd Marine Division fared better on the right, where the 9th Marines overran the villages of Tepungan and Piti, and occupied the ruins of Piti Naval Yard. At 14:25, the 3rd Battalion, 9th Marines, landed on Cabras Island, using LVTs to avoid the mined causeway. The island was not occupied, but was liberally sown with land mines.

During the night of 22–23 July, the 321st Independent Infantry Battalion launched a counterattack against the 21st Marines. By morning, only about 50 soldiers remained of what had been a 488-strong battalion. The Marines had also lost heavily, and in the counter-attack and the fighting on Bundschu Ridge, the 3rd Marines had lost 615 Marines. Turnage resolved to make another all-out assault on Bundschu Ridge on 23 July. Every available weapon pounded the ridge, but when the attack was made they discovered most of the Japanese defenders had withdrawn. The 3rd Marines secured the ridge and spent the rest of the day dealing with isolated nests of riflemen and machine gunners. The locus of the Japanese defense was now the Mount Tenjo Road; in American hands it could allow tanks to move up to the Fonte Plateau. Two battalions of the 21st Marines attacked up a ravine between the 3rd and 21st Marines, only to encounter a hail of machine gun fire from the cliffs overhead. An air strike was called in but the Marines' positions were too close to the bomb line and seventeen Marines were killed or wounded.

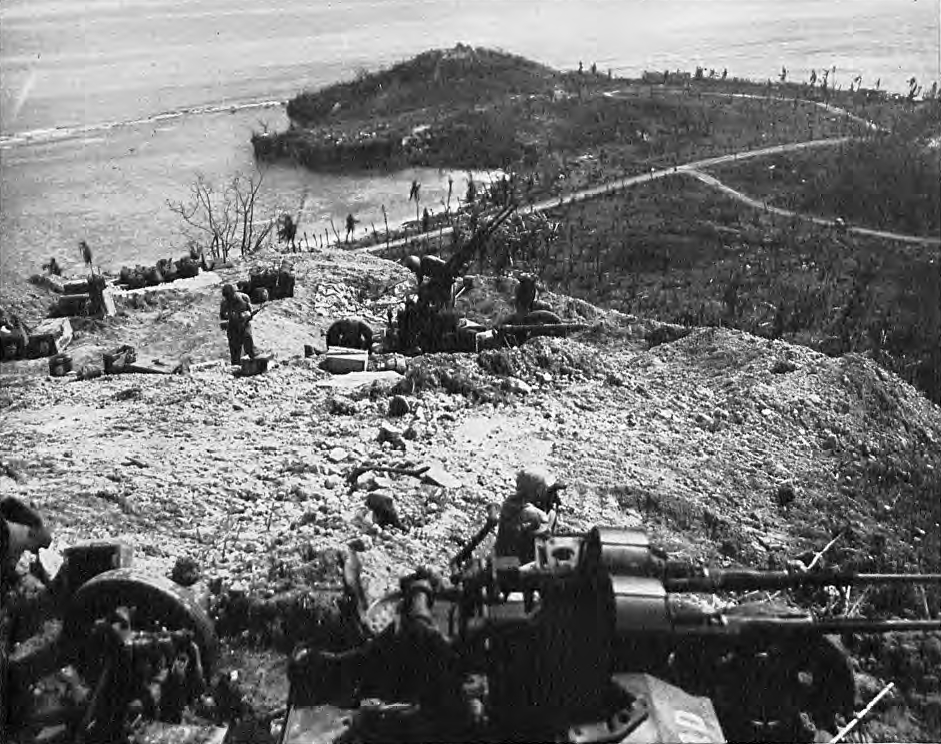
Oerlikon 20 mm cannon of Battery I, 14th Defense Battalion emplaced atop Chonito Cliff to support the advance

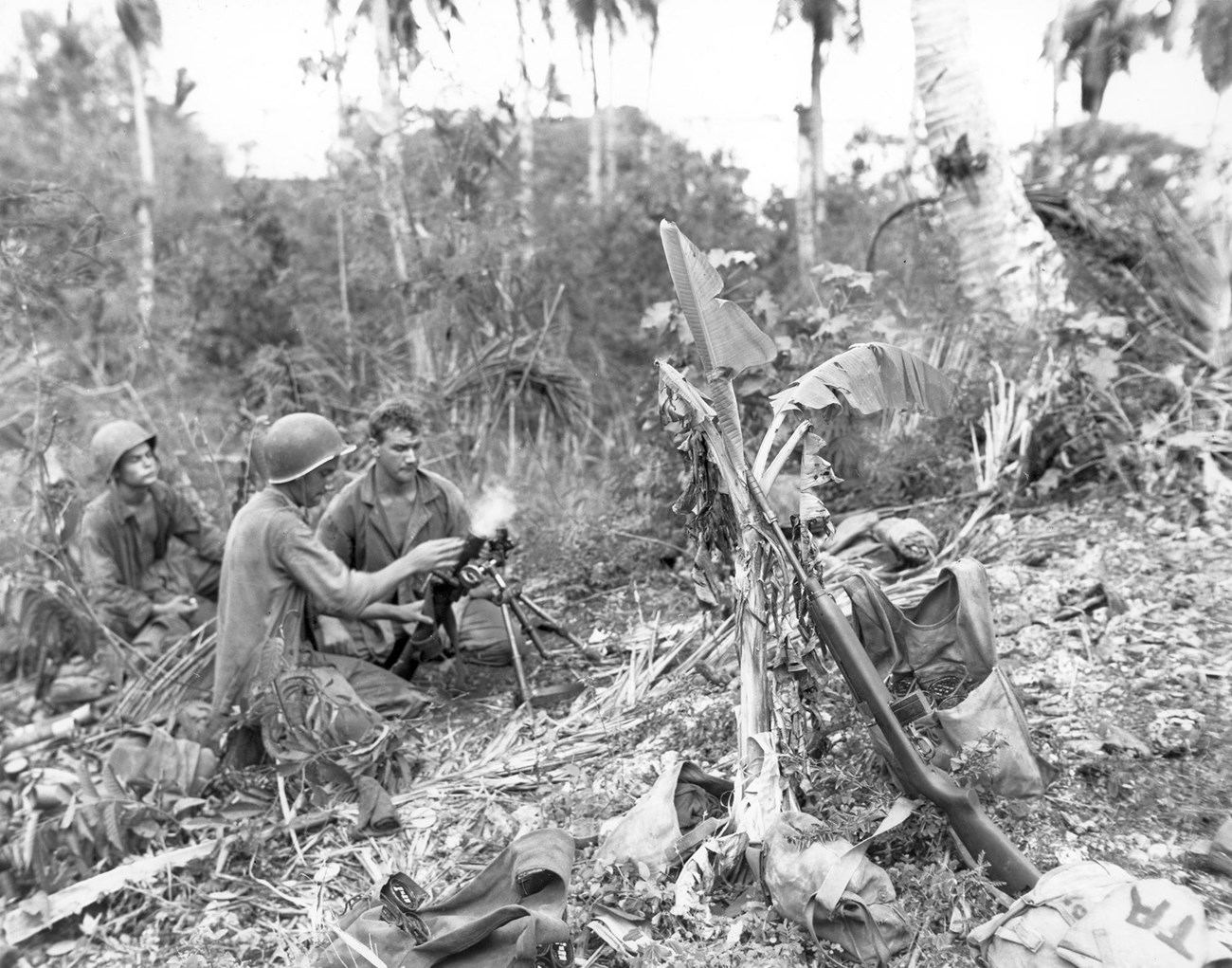
Mortarmen lay down a barrage.

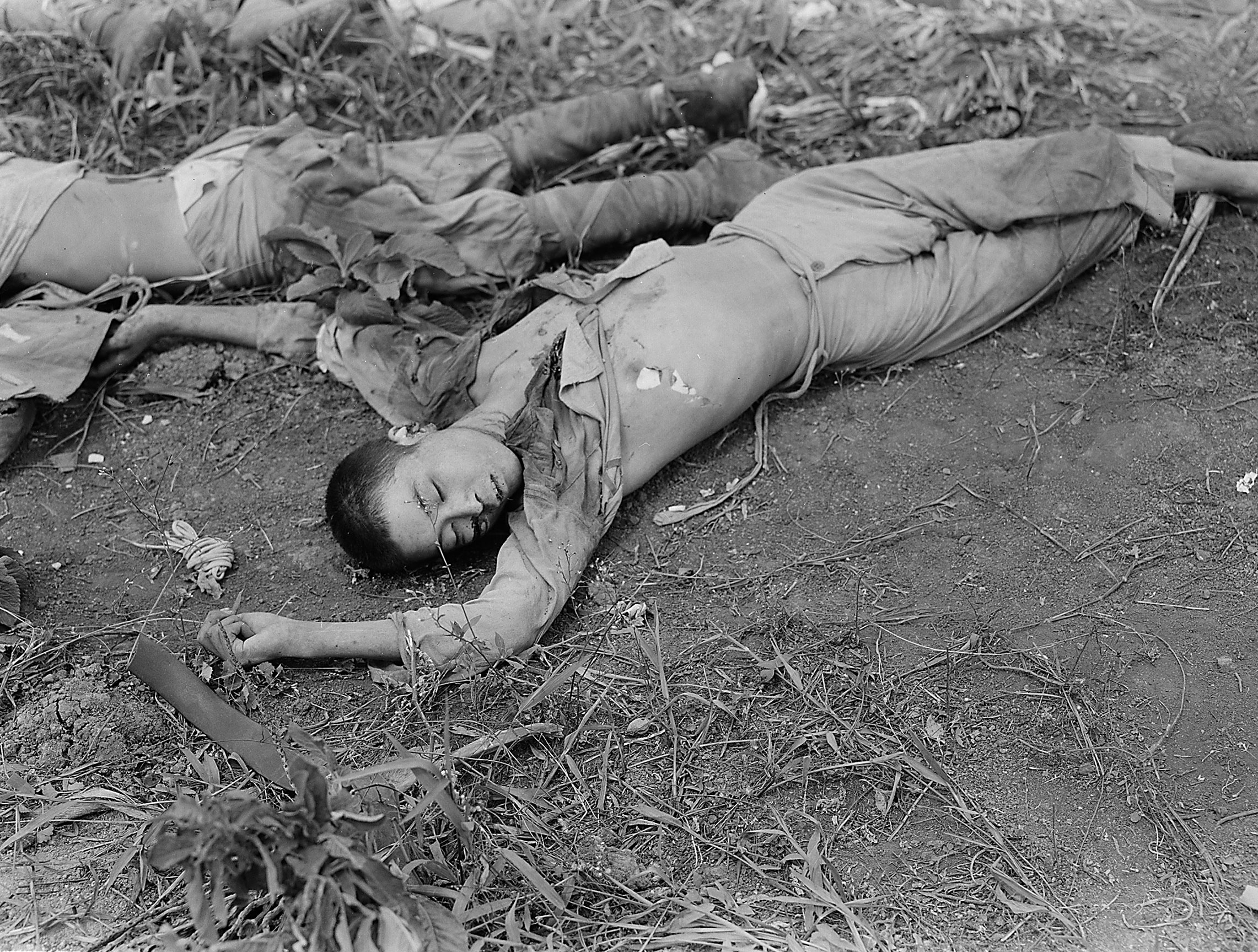
Japanese dead

On 25 July, Takashina launched a coordinated counterattack against the American positions. The 3rd Battalion, 18th Infantry Regiment, attacked a 25-man detachment of the 3rd Division Reconnaissance Company tasked with holding the gap between the 9th and 21 Marines. The unit was too small for the task, and after a firefight in which four Marines were killed and five wounded, the detachment withdrew to the lines of Company B, 9th Marines. Instead of moving through the gap it had created, the 3rd Battalion, 18th Infantry Regiment, continued to probe the Marines' positions, putting the 21st Marines under great pressure. Infiltrators extended the fighting into the 3rd Marine Division's rear areas, including around the hospital, where the 3rd Medical Battalion killed 33 Japanese soldiers at a cost of three killed and twenty wounded, two of whom later died of their wounds. Between 25 and 27 July, the 3rd Marine Division lost 166 killed, 645 wounded and 34 missing, mostly in the Japanese counterattack.

The counterattack cost the Japanese about 3,500 men. Three battalions were virtually destroyed. During the assault by the 54th Keibitai, Captain Yutaka Sugimoto was killed by artillery fire. The 18th Infantry Regiment lost its commander, Colonel Hiko-Shiro Ohashi, and the commanders of its 2nd and 3rd Battalions, Majors Chusha Maruyama and Setsuo Yukioka, respectively. Lieutenant Colonel Ichiro Katoaka, the commander of the 10th Independent Mixed Regiment, was also killed. Major General Kiyoshi Shigematsu, the commander of the 48th Mixed Brigade, was killed on 26 July when tanks attacked his command post on Mount Mangan. Obata reported to Imperial General Headquarters in Tokyo:

On the night of the 25th, the army, with its entire force, launched the general attack from Fonte and Mount Mangan toward Adelup Point. Commanding officers and all officers and men boldly charged the enemy. The fighting continued until dawn but our force failed to achieve the desired objectives, losing more than 80 percent of the personnel, for which I sincerely apologize. I will defend Mount Mangan to the last by assembling the remaining strength. I feel deeply sympathetic for the officers and men who fell in action and their bereaved families.

Takashina now decided to change tactics. Since it was clearly impossible to defeat the American forces on Guam, he decided to retreat to the interior of the island and conduct a campaign of attrition. He withdrew his troops from southern Guam, planning to make a stand in the mountainous central and northern part of the island, "to engage in delaying action in the jungle in northern Guam to hold the island as long as possible". But before he could evacuate his command post, he was killed by machine gun fire, leaving Obata in command. On 27 July, the 3rd Marine Division launched an all-out assault on Fonte Plateau. The Japanese defenders made good use of the terrain, fighting from a network of bunkers, caves and trenches, inflicting more than a hundred casualties on the Marines in three days of bitter fighting before the plateau was taken. Meanwhile, the 3rd Battalion, 9th Marines, fought their way to the top of Mount Chachao, annihilating a Japanese company left there as a rearguard. As they did so, they saw American troops on Mount Tenjo. This was the 77th Infantry Division. That afternoon, the soldiers made contact with the Marines, and the two beachheads were joined.

== Southern beachhead ==
=== W-Day at Agat ===
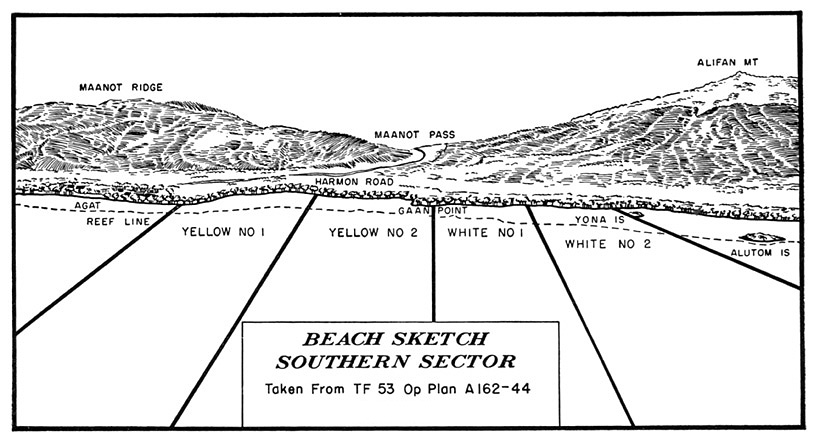
Southern beach sketch

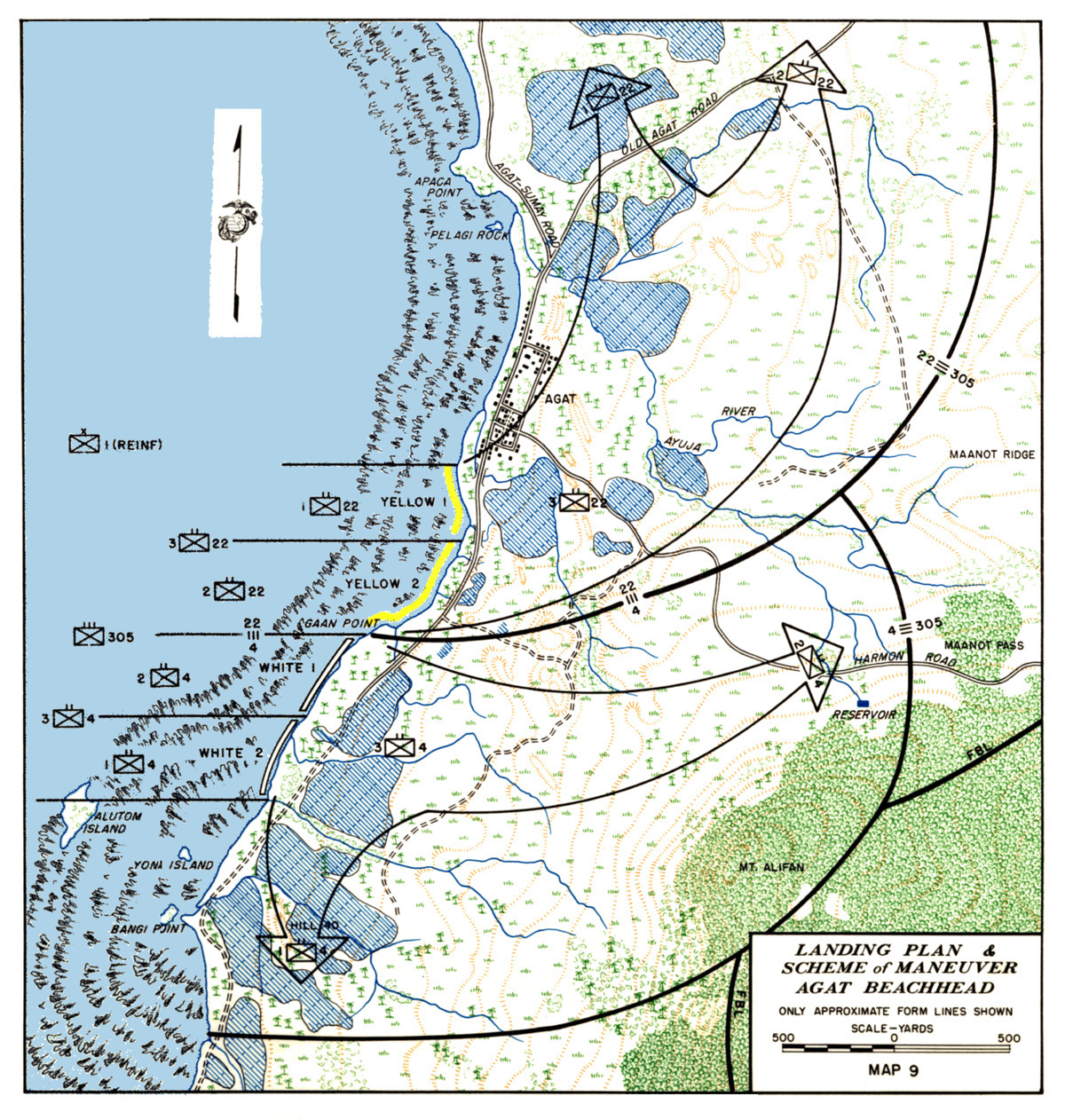
Scheme of maneuver, Agat beachhead

In the south, the 4th Marines landed on White Beaches 1 and 2, north of Bangi Point, while the 22nd Marines landed on Yellow Beaches 1 and 2 to the north. Intense Japanese fire commenced when the first wave of the 22nd Marines was about 100 yards (91 m) from the beach. The leading waves reported ten LVT(A)s and LVTs destroyed by Japanese fire during the landing; another fifteen were lost on W-Day due to Japanese fire, damage from the coral reef and mechanical trouble. The aid station party of the 1st Battalion, 22nd Marines, took a direct hit from a Japanese 75 mm field gun, killing or injuring the entire party and destroying most of the medical supplies. This left the unit without a doctor, and short of corpsmen and stretcher bearers until the afternoon.

While the initial Japanese reaction was stronger than at Asan, the terrain was more favorable to the attackers, the ground beyond the beaches consisting of low hills and open ground suitable for tanks to operate. Despite numerous pillboxes, the 1st Provisional Marine Brigade made good progress. The 4th Marines cleared Bangi Point and Hill 40, while the 22nd Marines took Agat, which had been reduced to rubble by the preliminary bombardment, but was still staunchly defended. The elevations in the 22nd Marines' area were so low they were not marked on the contour map. One such 10-to-20-foot (3.0 to 6.1 m) rise about 100 yards (91 m) from the beach was defended by Japanese troops dug in on the reverse slope, but they only briefly delayed the 2nd Battalion, 22nd Marines.

The 2nd Battalion, 305th Infantry, boarded LCVPs at 10:30 but then circled aimlessly until 14:05, when the order to land was received. The 77th Infantry Division had no LVTs, and the LCVPs grounded on the reef. No LVTs were available, so they had to wade ashore through waist-deep water, occasionally falling into deep potholes. The regimental commander, Colonel Vincent J. Tanzola, received the order to land the rest of the regiment at 15:30. Only enough LCVPs were available, so he loaded the 1st Battalion and sent it off. However, the naval officers did not permit it to land until they received an order from Shepherd at 17:30. Once again, the soldiers had to make their way from the reef on foot, but by now the tide was coming in. The 3rd Battalion had to wait for the LCVPs to return but in the meantime a report of a Japanese submarine caused the transports to put to sea. Their ship, USS Alpine, returned at 21:10 and the troops moved ashore from the reef in five LVTs borrowed from the Marines. Meanwhile, Tanzola paddled ashore in a rubber raft he found on the reef.

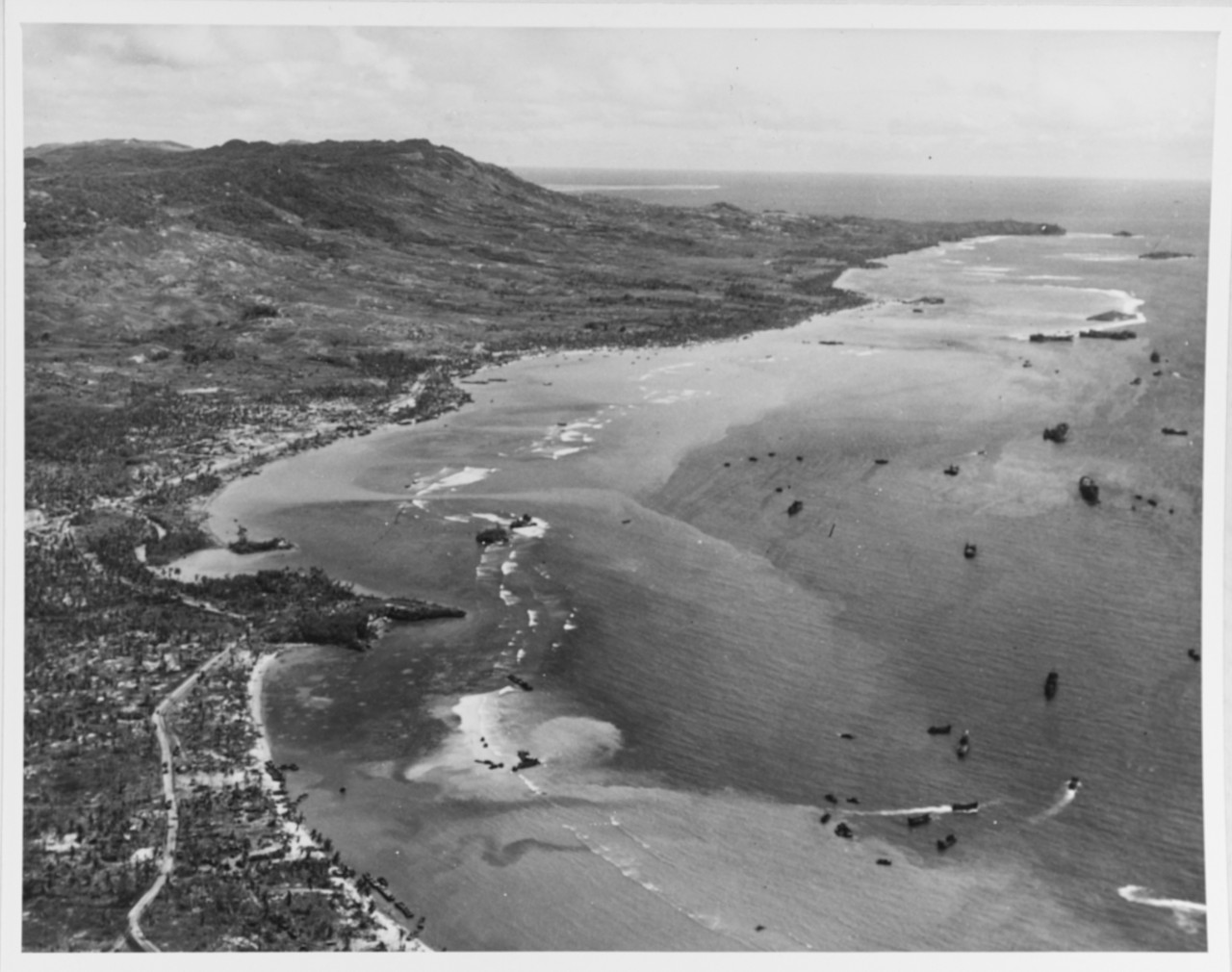
Agat Invasion Beach, 21 July 1944

By nightfall, the Marines and soldiers had established beachheads about 1,300 to 2,300 yards (1,200 to 2,100 m) deep. The brigade command post opened 200 yards (180 m) southeast of Gaan Point at 13:50, and Shepherd assumed command ashore. He organized a defense in depth against the Japanese counterattack he was certain would come during the night. Both the brigade's pack howitzer battalions were in position and registered before dark, having been brought ashore by DUKWs. The DUKWs were then used to fetch ammunition. One battery of the 305th Field Artillery arrived after dark. At 18:30, Shepherd reported to Geiger:

Own casualties about 350. Enemy unknown. Critical shortages fuel and ammunition all types. Think we can handle it. Will continue as planned tomorrow.

Supply was difficult. Landing ships could not come closer than the reef, several hundred yards from the beach, and the loss of twenty-four LVTs was sorely felt. A layer of silt on the shore side of the reef caused DUKWs and LVTs to become bogged. Rubber raft causeways and ships' life rafts were used as expedients to get the needed supplies ashore. Cranes were used to shift supplies in cargo nets from landing craft to the LVTs and DUKWs. Unlike the northern beaches, where some cranes were set up on the reef, all the cranes on the southern beaches had to be barge mounted, with cargo transferred in deep water. The Navy assisted by continuing unloading operations through the night. About one-fifth of the total strength of III Amphibious Corps was engaged in unloading activities. The 1st Provisional Marine Brigade had 1,070 personnel on board ship and 1,800 on the reef and beaches engaged in unloading work. The 77th Infantry Division, with three battalions of shore party engineers and 270 garrison troops with low landing priorities, had 583 soldiers unloading ships and 1,828 working ashore. Potential supply dump locations identified beforehand from aerial photos were often found to be rice paddies, which were unsuitable.

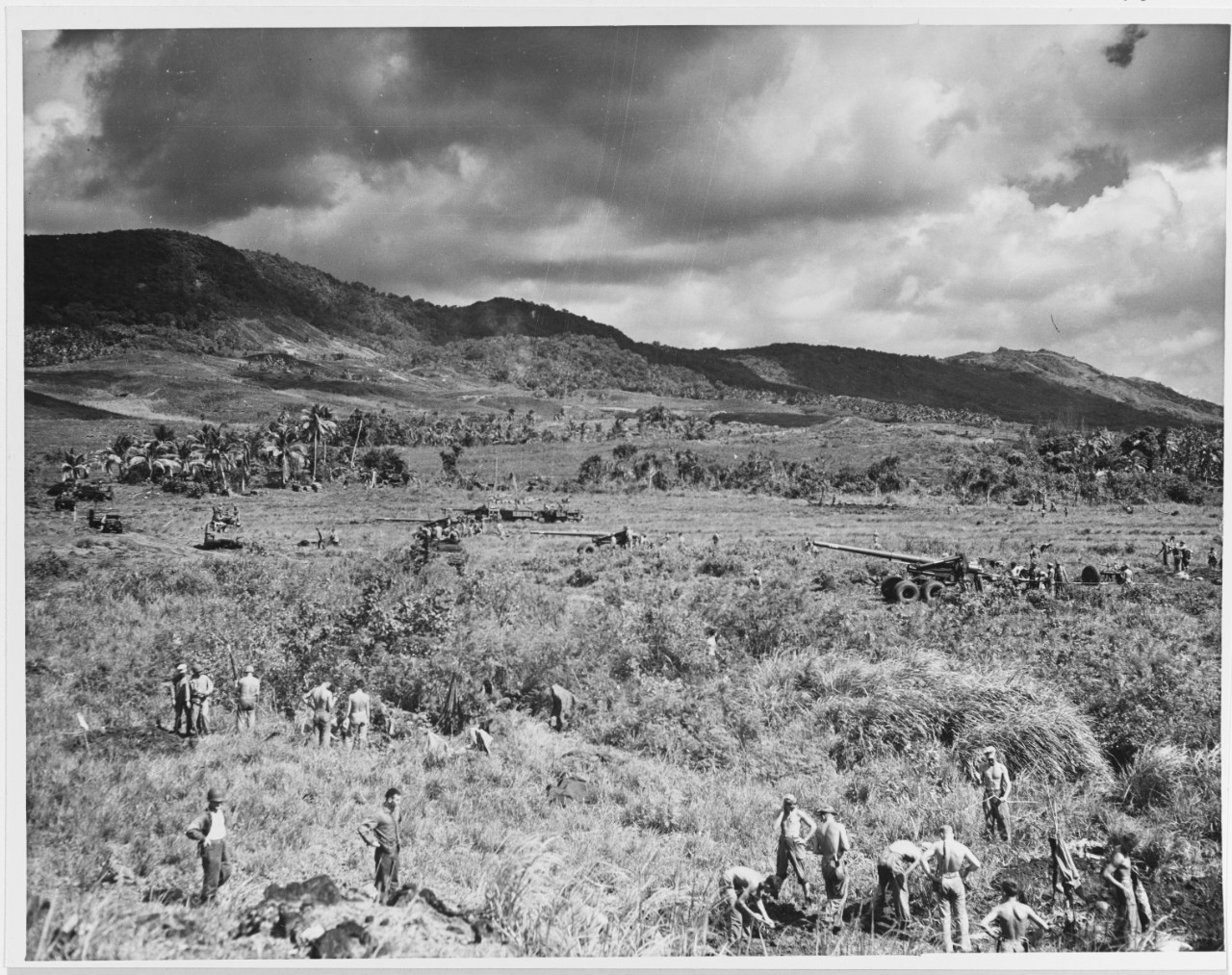
155mm guns of A Battery, 7th 155mm Gun Battalion, are set up 500 yards in from White Beach Two.

The expected counterattack was not long in coming. The focal point of the Japanese attack by the 3rd Battalion, 38th Infantry Regiment, was Hill 40. Company K, 4th Marines, was twice driven off the hill but rallied and retook it. During the night, small groups of infiltrators armed with demolition charges made their way toward the beaches. Some were intercepted by sentries of the 305th Infantry, but others made it to the beach road, where they disabled two weapons carriers and three LVTs before being killed. A platoon from the 5th Field Depot killed fourteen before they could get to the brigade ammunition dump, and the 4th Tank Company killed 23 around its service park. Some also reached the lines of the field artillery, which had to alternate fire missions with fighting infiltrators. Around 02:30, a column of Japanese tanks engaged Company B, 4th Marines. Two were destroyed by a bazooka team before the gunner was killed, and the others were knocked out by hastily summoned Sherman tanks.

During the night, the 1st Provisional Marine Brigade lost about 50 killed and twice as many wounded; about 600 Japanese bodies were counted. The 38th Infantry Regiment was almost completely destroyed. Among the dead was its commander, Colonel Tsunetaro Suenaga. Its 2nd Battalion, which was still intact, retreated to the Orote Peninsula. About 300 survivors of the rest of the regiment gathered northeast of Mount Alifan, where they were ordered to head to Ordot, the assembly point for reserves.

=== Cutting off the Orote Peninsula ===
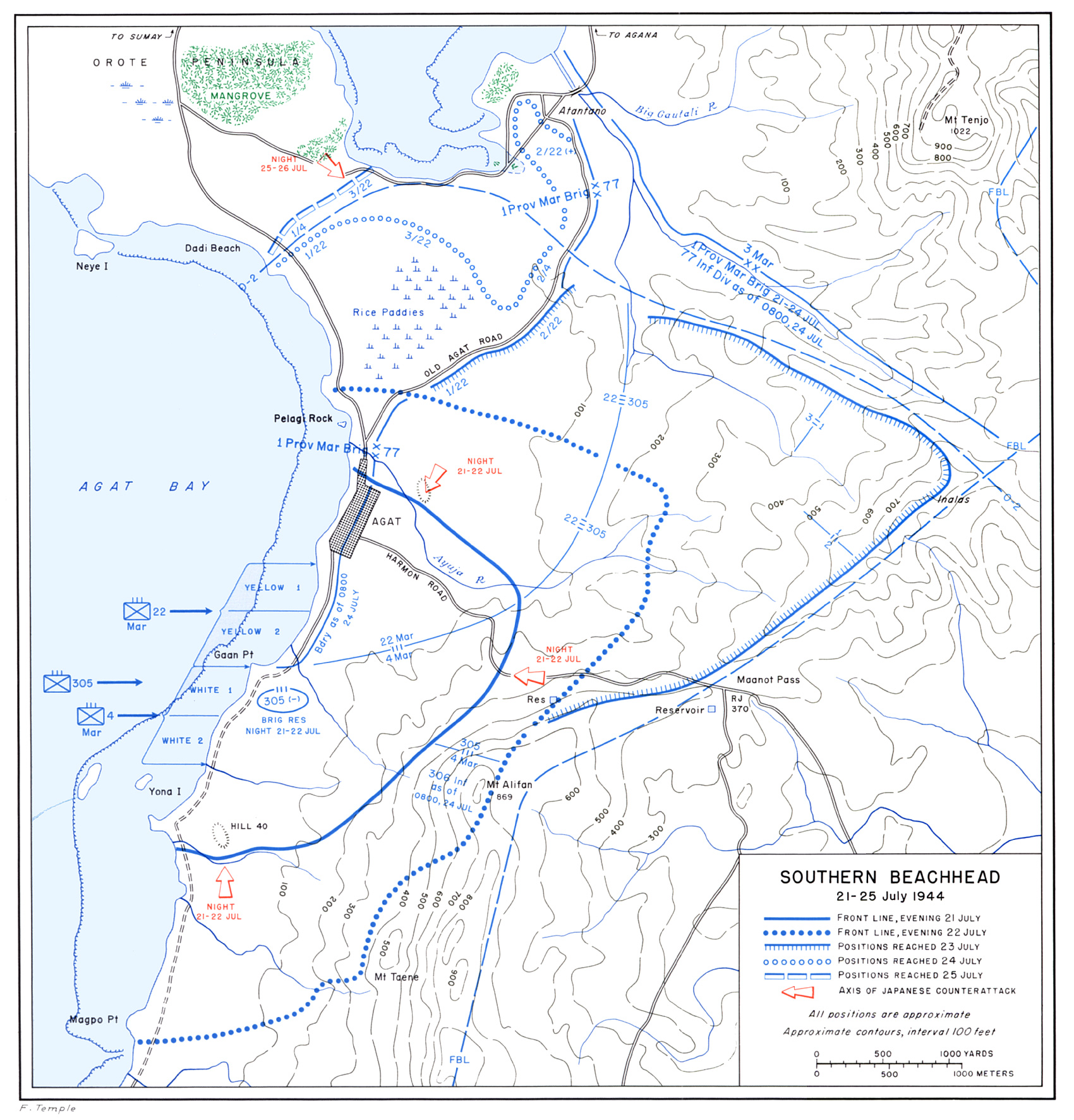
Southern beachhead 21–25 July

On 22 July, Shepherd ordered his units to expand the beachhead in all directions. Opposition was light, with the soldiers and Marines having more difficulty with the terrain. A patrol from the 4th Marines was able to reach the summit of Mount Alifan and found it unoccupied. Meanwhile, the 22nd Marines reached the Ayuja River to find the road bridge had been destroyed. They were reluctant to cross without armored support, and the tanks found the banks too steep to scale. LVT(A)s were therefore called upon. By mid-morning, two thirds of the 155 mm guns and howitzers of the III Amphibious Corps Artillery were ashore, and the anti-aircraft guns of the 9th Defense Battalion were in place, as were the four battalions of the 77th Division Artillery by late afternoon.

Shepherd and Bruce intended to relieve the 4th Marines with the 306th Infantry so the former could participate in the assault on the Orote Peninsula, but no LVTs or DUKWs were available to bring them ashore, as all the available transport was being used to fetch supplies and artillery pieces. Reifsnider recommended they come in around the noon half tide, when the water was waist deep, although this precluded an early relief of the Marines. The 3rd Battalion, 306th Infantry, began coming ashore at 11:30 on 23 July, followed by the rest of the regiment in the afternoon. Most of the radio sets were ruined by contact with salt water, many vehicles drowned and had to be dragged ashore by bulldozers, and a tank disappeared into a large shell hole. At 08:00 on 24 July, the 77th Infantry Division assumed responsibility for the defense of the beachhead east of the Old Agat Road. Its third regiment, the 307th Infantry, started wading ashore at 13:00 in heavy swells whipped up by a storm out to sea.

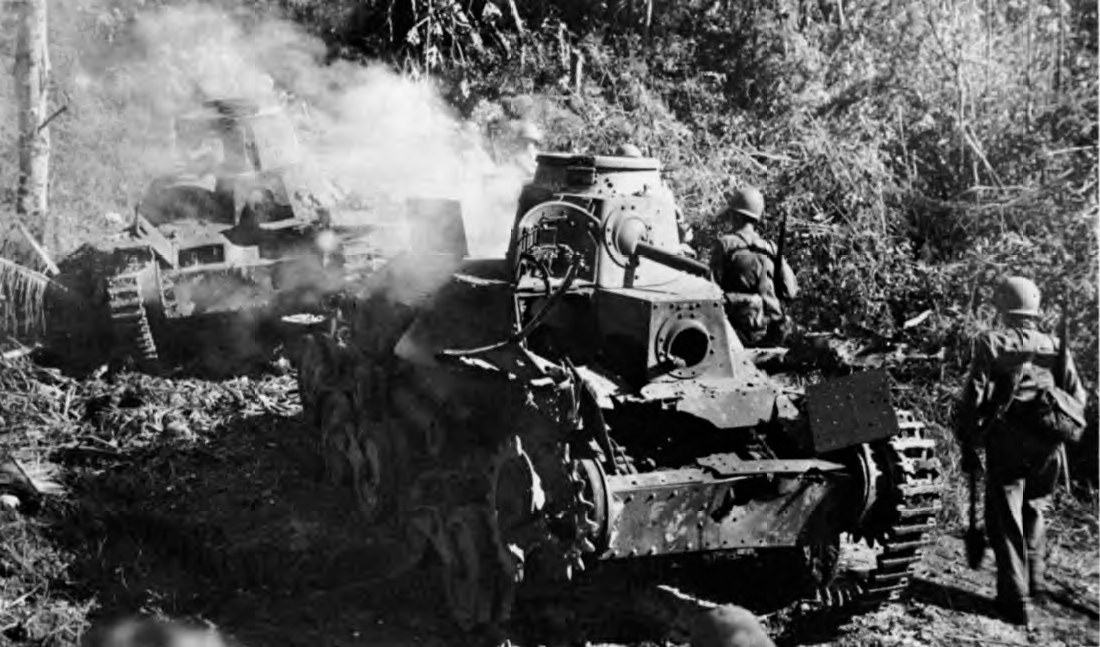
Smouldering Japanese tanks knocked out on the Agat-Sumay road by U.S. Medium tanks

A tank dozer and tank crews of the 22nd Tank Company with picks and shovels constructed a causeway over the Ayuja River, allowing tanks to cross, but when the 22nd Marines attempted to advance across the rice paddies at the base of the Orote Peninsula on 23 July they were pinned down under mortar and small arms fire. Tanks became bogged in the soft mud of the rice paddies, but when they tried to use the road, one was disabled by 37 mm anti-tank gun fire and another by a mine.

The attack was resumed at 10:00 the next day after an intense aerial, artillery and naval bombardment. Five Japanese tanks attempted to counterattack but they were engaged and knocked out by Shermans. Another three Japanese tanks were destroyed by fighter bombers. The Shermans turned their guns on Japanese concrete emplacements and coconut bunkers. Concealed Japanese guns on the Orote Peninsula cliffs near Neye Island were engaged by USS LCI(G)-366 and LCI(G)-429; five sailors were killed and 26 wounded from their crews before the Japanese guns were silenced. In the afternoon, the 22nd Marines overran a series of abandoned dumps and positions and took the village of Atantano, thereby cutting off the Orote Peninsula. The cost of the first days' fighting in the southern beachhead was high, but not nearly as high as in the north. Between 21 and 24 July inclusive, the 1st Provisional Marine Brigade lost 188 killed, 728 wounded, and 87 missing, while the 77th Infantry Division had lost 24 killed, 63 wounded and 1 missing.

=== Clearing the Orote Peninsula ===
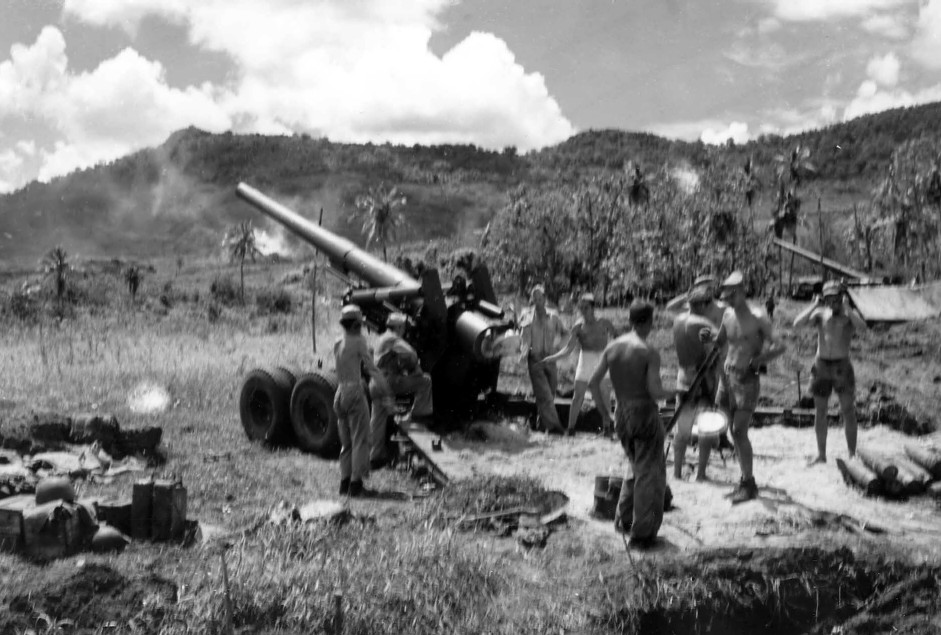
A 155 mm gun M1 on White Beach of the III Amphibious Corps Artillery fires

With the death of Suenaga, Commander Asaichi Tamai of the 263rd Air Group became the senior officer in charge on the Orote Peninsula. On the night of 25 July, the 2nd Battalion, 38th Infantry Regiment, counterattacked as part of the general counteroffensive of the 29th Division. A banzai charge against Company L, 22nd Marines, and a platoon of the 4th Marines was met by the Marines calling down the combined artillery fire of the 1st Provisional Marine Brigade, the III Amphibious Corps and the 77th Infantry Division. The Japanese troops who made it through the barrage and enfilading machine gun fire died in close combat. By morning, 26,000 artillery rounds had been fired, and over 400 Japanese soldiers lay dead around the Marines' positions. This ended the 2nd Battalion, 38th Infantry Regiment as a fighting force, and the primary responsibility for the defense of the Orote Peninsula now fell on the naval troops, particularly the 54th Keibatai.

Over the next four days, the 4th and 22nd Marines, supported by Marine and Army tanks, cleared the Orote Peninsula, which was defended by improvised minefields made from aerial bombs covered by gun emplacements and defilading mortar and machine gun fire from camouflaged bunkers and strongpoints made from concrete and coconut logs. Around 16:00 on 29 July, two platoons with tanks reached Orote Point, where they killed two Japanese soldiers. On receiving their report, Shepherd declared the peninsula secured. Many of the Japanese defenders who remained on the peninsula committed suicide when US troops approached; other tried to swim to the harbor, but were killed or captured by a waiting LVT(A) platoon. Securing the Orote Peninsula cost the Marines 115 killed, 721 wounded and 38 missing. As many as 2,500 Japanese had died in the process.

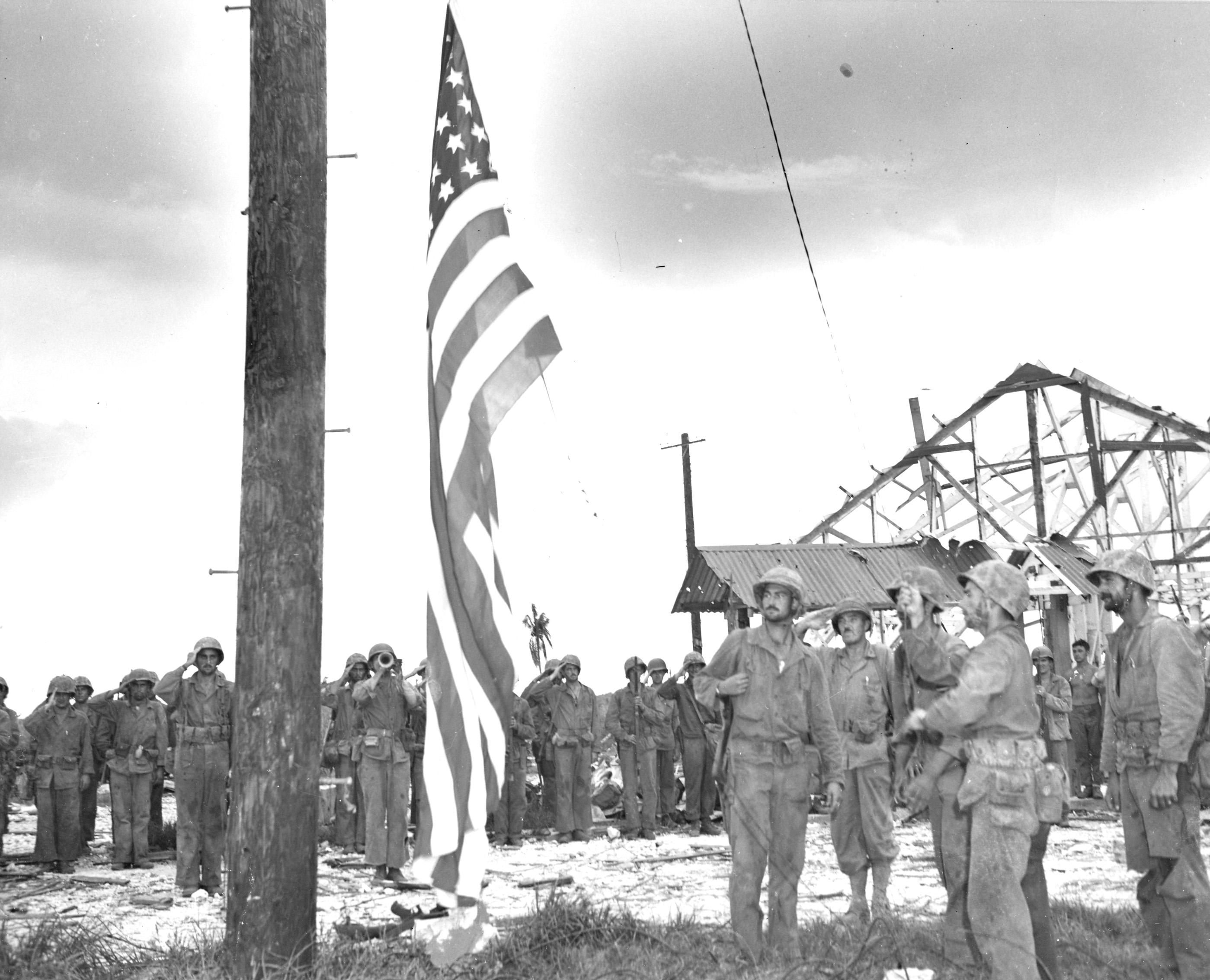
Marines raise the American Flag over the Marine barracks

At 15:30 on 29 July, the American flag was raised over the Marine barracks on Guam once more in a formal ceremony attended by Spruance, Smith, Geiger, Larsen and Shepherd. Shepherd declared:

On this hallowed ground, you officers and men of the First Marine Brigade have avenged the loss of our comrades who were overcome by a numerically superior enemy three days after Pearl Harbor. Under our flag this island again stands ready to fulfil its destiny as an American fortress in the Pacific.

The following day, a Navy Grumman TBF Avenger from the escort carrier USS Chenango made a test landing on the airstrip, which had been hastily repaired by the 2nd Marine Separate Engineer Battalion. The escort carriers USS Sangamon and Suwannee then each launched two observation aircraft from VMO-1, which henceforth operated from the airstrip, along with Army observation aircraft.

== Final operations ==
Between 28 July and 2 August, the 77th Infantry Division's 77th Reconnaissance Troop sent out a series of five-man patrols, each accompanied by a Chamorro guide, to determine what Japanese units remained in the southern part of the island. The dense jungle made aerial reconnaissance unreliable. The patrol reports and those from Chamorro civilians indicated what Geiger already suspected: the main body of the Japanese forces had retreated to the north, and there were no significant enemy units in the south. Obata had decided to make his last stand on Mount Santa Rosa. On 31 July, Geiger started an offensive north with the 3rd Marine Division on the left and the 77th Infantry Division on the right. The 3rd Marines liberated Agana that day. The uncompleted Tiyan airfield was captured on 1 August.

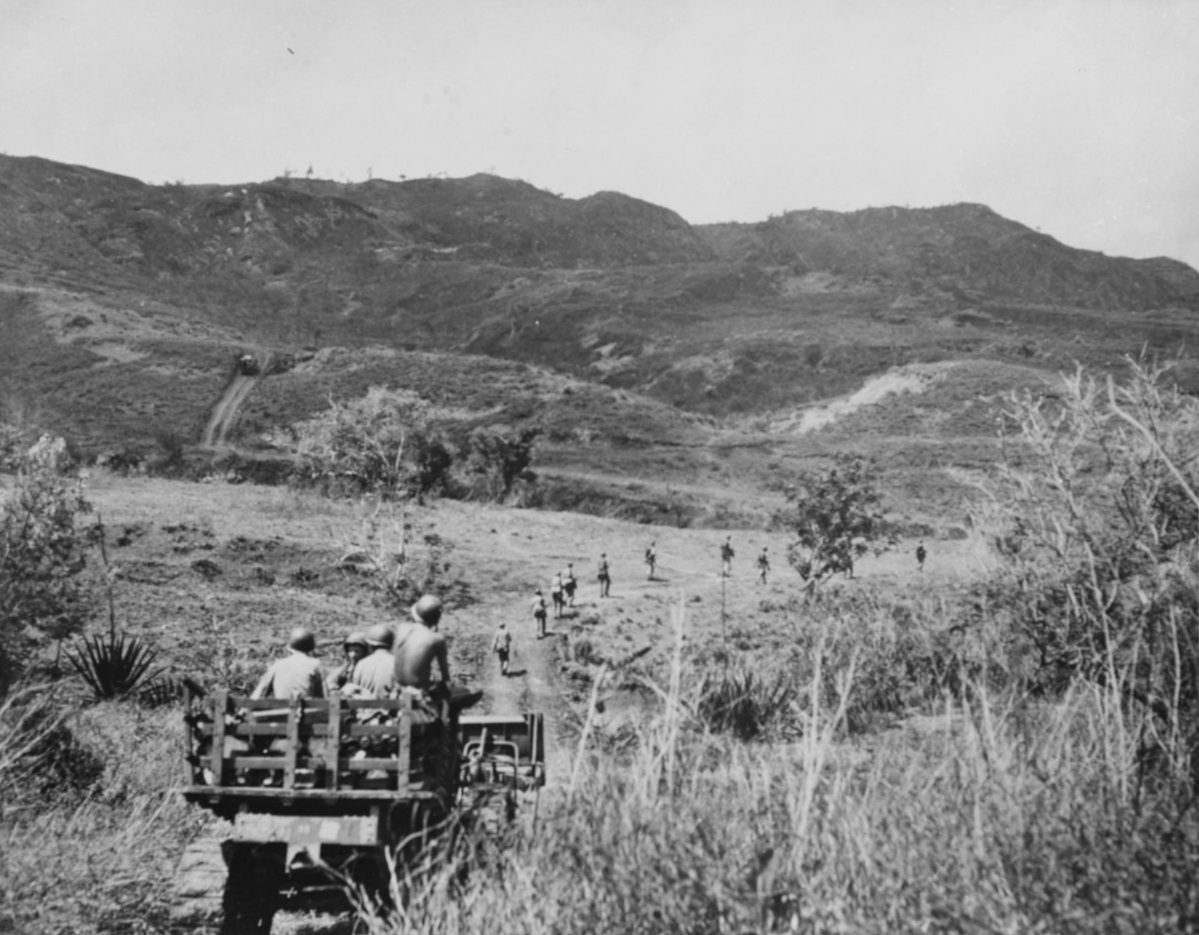
A marine tractor, loaded with ammunition and water, follows Marines along a road leading to the front lines.

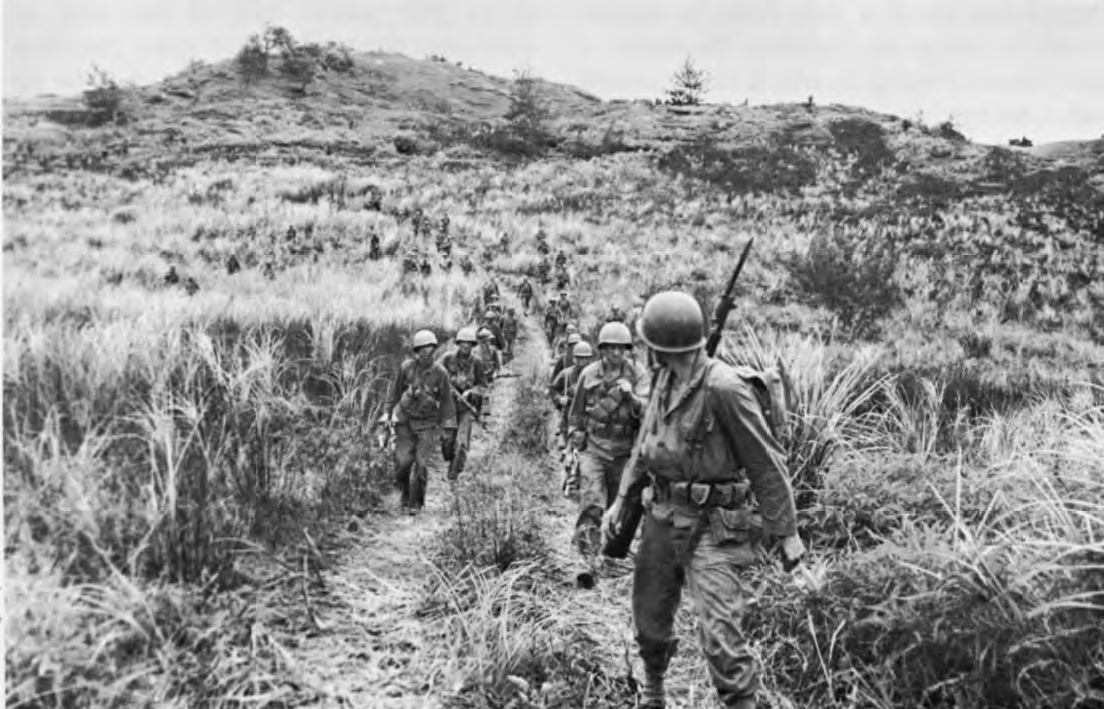
Company B, 305th Infantry, moving out from the high ground

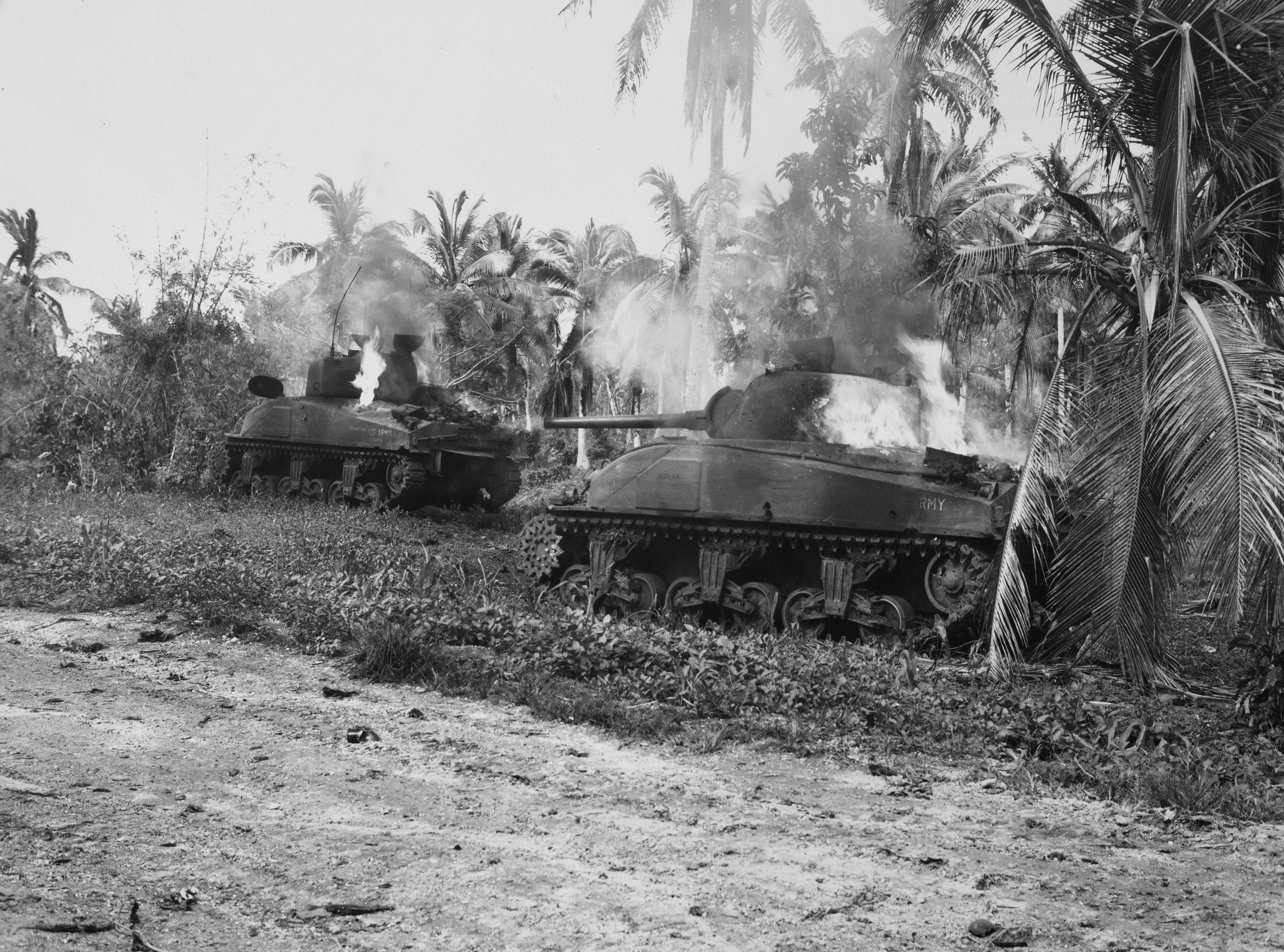
Burning U.S. tanks in Yigo

Rain and thick jungle made conditions difficult for the Americans, but after an engagement with the main Japanese line of defense around Mount Barrigada from 2 to 4 August, the Japanese line collapsed. The 1st Provisional Brigade formed up on the left flank of the 3rd Marine Division on 7 August because of the widening front and continued casualties, in an effort to prevent the Japanese from slipping through gaps in the line. That day the 307th Infantry clashed with two tanks that held up the capture of the village of Yigo, but only for a few hours. The following day, it captured the Japanese stronghold at Mount Santa Rosa. On 10 August, Geiger declared all organized Japanese resistance had ended.

Not everyone heard the message. That day, the 1st Battalion, 306th Infantry, encountered cave positions at Mount Mataguac, and in the ensuing clash, lost 8 dead and 17 wounded before withdrawing for the night. The caves contained Obata's headquarters. In his final message to Imperial General Headquarters, he reported:

I accepted the important post of the army commander and although I exerted all-out effort, the fortune of war has not been with me. The fighting has not been in our favor since the loss of Saipan. We are continuing a desperate battle on Guam. Officers and men have been lost, weapons have been destroyed, and ammunition has been expended. We have only our bare hands to fight with. The holding of Guam has become hopeless. I will engage the enemy in the last battle with the remaining strength at Mount Mataguac tomorrow, the 11th. My only fear is that report of death with honor (annihilation) at Guam might shock the Japanese people at home. Our souls will defend the island to the very end; we pray for the security of the Empire. I am overwhelmed with sorrow for the families of the many fallen officers and men. I request that measures be taken for government assistance to them.

The next morning, the 1st Battalion, 306th Infantry, returned with tanks and used Bangalore torpedoes and TNT to seal the caves. During the fight, Obata committed suicide.

== Aftermath ==
=== Japanese holdouts ===
By 12 August 1944, the number of Japanese dead in the fighting was estimated at 11,340. Since there were 18,500 Japanese troops on Guam on 21 July, it followed as many as 10,000 remained at large, assuming errors counting the dead. The last surviving general officer, Major General Yoshitomo Tamura, the chief of staff of the Thirty-First Army, committed suicide on 22 August. With his death, the ranking Japanese officer on Guam became Lieutenant Colonel Hideyuki Takeda, the operations officer of the 29th Division. In July 1945, the Island Command reported 7,831 Japanese had been killed and 1,026 taken prisoner since 10 August 1944. By the end of August 1945, 18,377 Japanese dead were counted and 1,250 had been captured.

As time went by, the condition of the Japanese holdouts became ever more desperate. Most had no weapons and the few who did had little ammunition. Food became their main concern. On 11 June 1945, Major Seihachi Sato surrendered himself and his 34 men. After Japan surrendered, leaflets were dropped with an order to surrender signed by Sato. On 27 August, 63 Japanese surrendered near Mount Barrigada. Sato met with Takeda four days later and arranged for him to surrender. He came in on 4 September, along with 67 of his men. Another 46 surrendered in the Tarague area on Takeda's orders. The last organized group was one of survivors of the 18th Infantry Regiment led by Lieutenant Yasuhiro Yamashita, who surrendered on 12 September.

In January 1946, the Island Command reported 1,550 Japanese had been taken prisoner since Japan's surrender. On 8 December 1945, three Marines were ambushed and killed; another was killed six days later. To deal with holdouts, the Guam Police Combat Patrol was formed in November 1944. By the time it was wound up at the end of 1948, it had captured five Japanese and killed 117. A few months later, Private Shigero Arimoto surrendered. Another eight holdouts were captured in September 1951. Sergeant Masashi Itō surrendered on 23 May 1960, after the last of his companions was captured. On 24 January 1972, Sergeant Shoichi Yokoi was discovered by hunters on the island. He had lived alone in a cave for 28 years near Talofofo Falls.

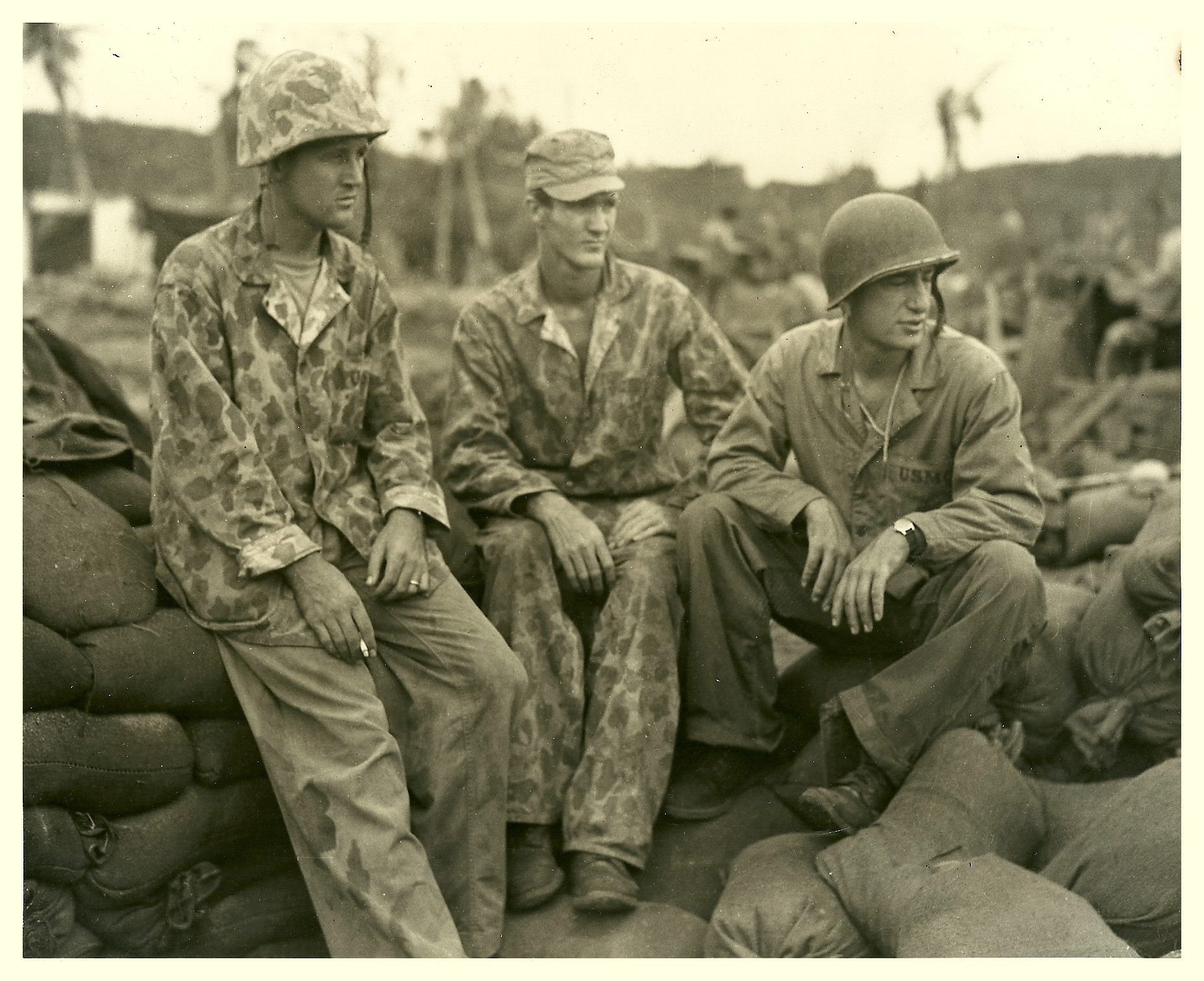
Three Marine officers of an amphibian tractor battalion who took part in the invasion of Guam (left to right): Major Erwin F. Wann, Major W. W. Butler, and Lt. Colonel Sylvester Stephens

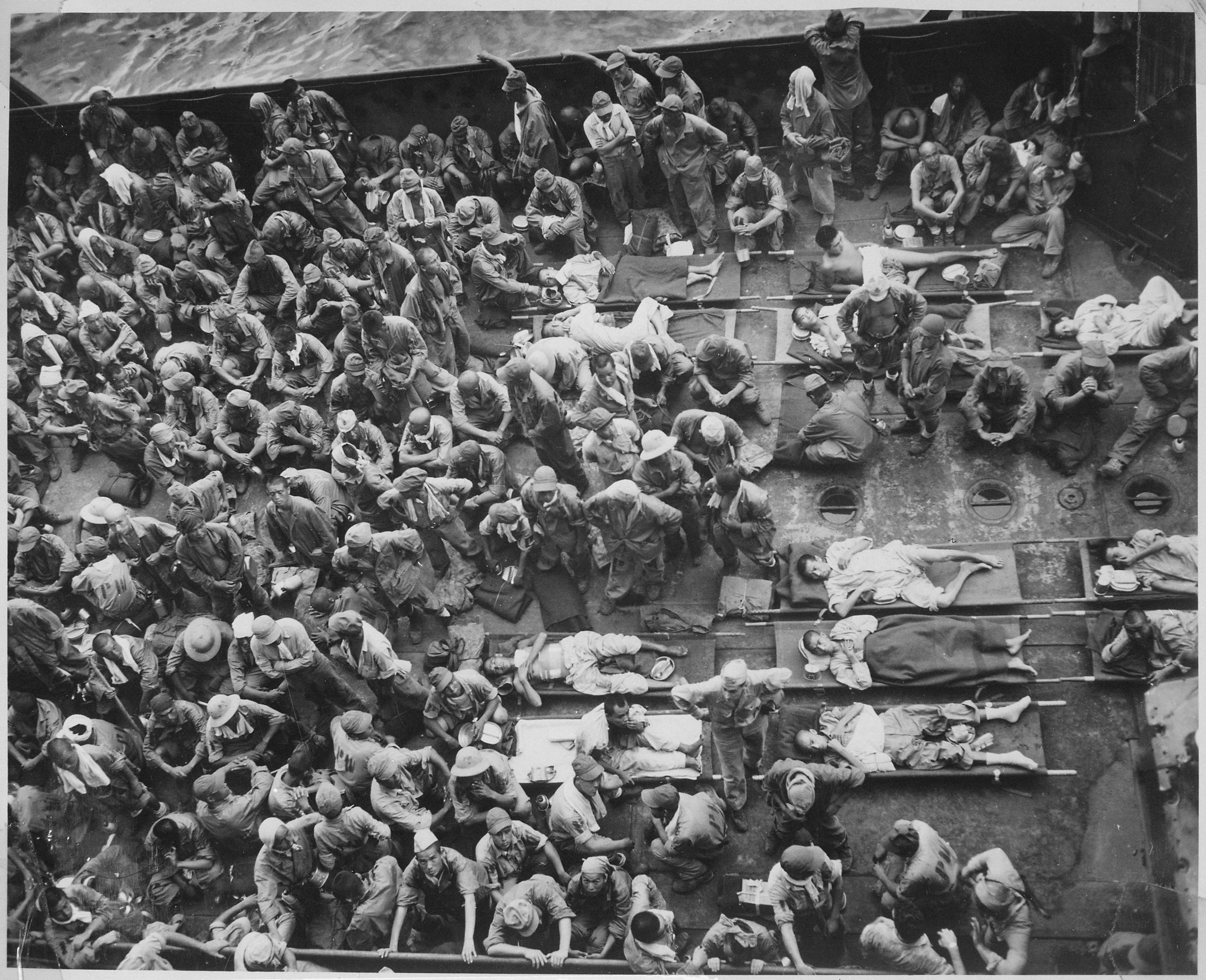
A Landing Craft, Tank, brings 221 Japanese prisoners of war to a Coast Guard-manned troop transport for transfer to Pearl Harbor.

=== American casualties ===
Marine casualties on Guam (including naval personnel assigned to Marine units) up to 10 August 1944 amounted to 1,190 killed and 377 died of wounds and 5,308 wounded in action. Army casualties for the same period were 177 dead and 662 wounded. Naval units on Guam lost 3 killed and 15 wounded, and ships lost 13 killed and 27 wounded. An estimated 600 civilians also died.

=== Base development ===
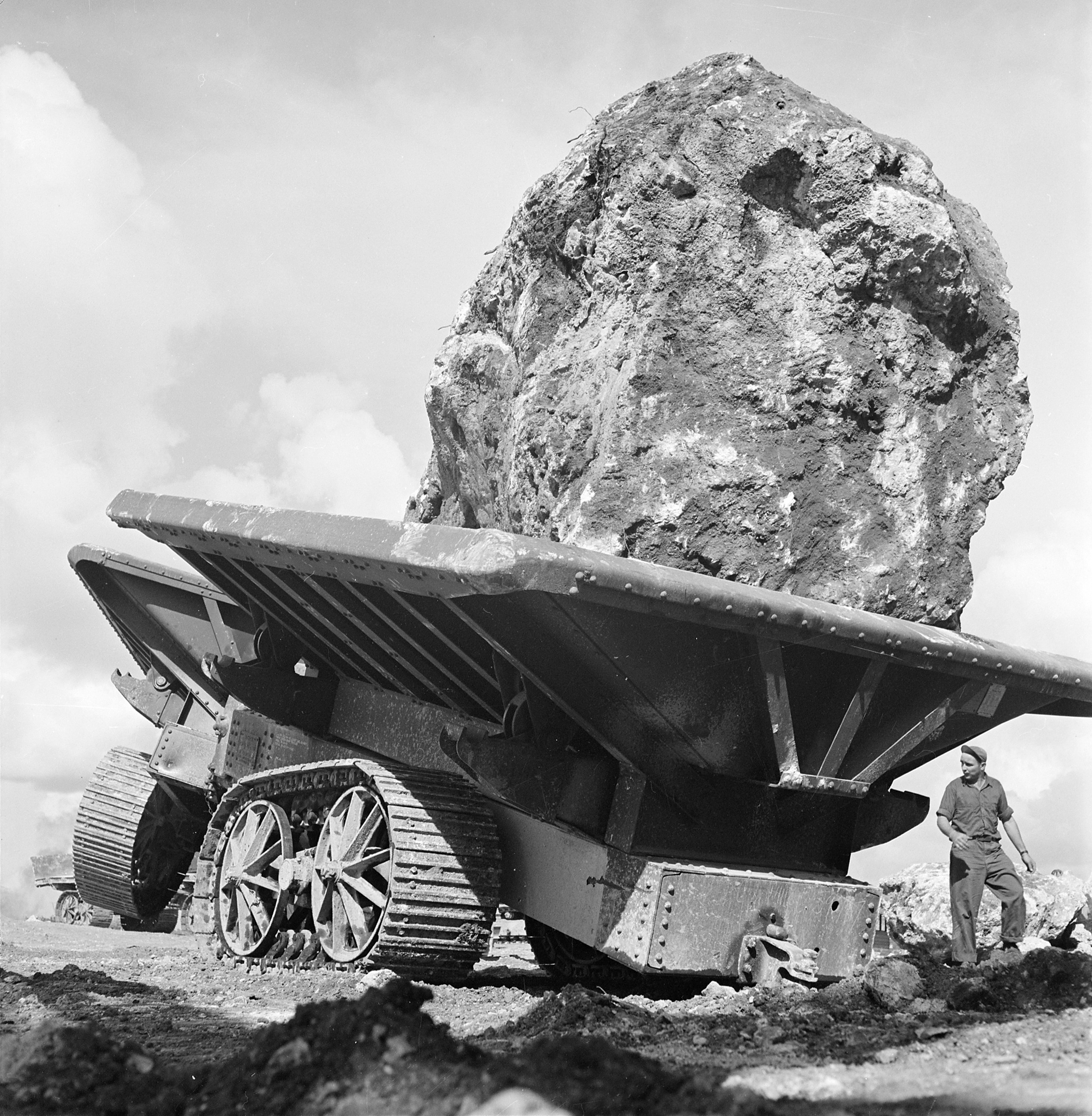
Seawall under construction by Seabees of the 76th Construction Battalion at Apra Harbor. A 30-ton boulder is hauled to dumping spot.

In the months after the battle, Guam was transformed into a major supply, naval and air base, and eventually became the location of Nimitz's headquarters. For this purpose, the 5th Naval Construction Brigade was activated at Pearl Harbor on 1 June 1944 under the command of Captain William O. Hiltabidle Jr., with the 26th, 27th and 28th (Special) Naval Construction Regiments assigned. The first Seabees, the 25th and 53rd Construction Battalions, 2nd and 13th Special Battalions, and Construction Battalion Maintenance Unit 515, arrived with the assault troops, and mainly performed stevedoring duties. The 5th Naval Construction Brigade staff came ashore on 23 July.

The first order of business was the development of Apra Harbor. Work commenced on a pontoon pier on Cabras Island on 5 August. This was completed on 22 August, and by October six 42-by-350-foot (13 by 107 m) piers were in operation. Between 3 and 6 October, Guam was struck by a typhoon that wrecked all the piers and severely damaged the barges that had been sunk to create a breakwater. The damage was repaired, and a new design was used to make the piers more resilient. Limestone was quarried on Cabra Island to construct a breakwater 3,260 feet (990 m) in length and 32 feet (9.8 m) in width. Development of the inner harbor involved 7,500,000 cubic feet (210,000 m^{3}) of dredging.

The Japanese-built Orote Field was rebuilt and lengthened to 5,500 feet (1,700 m). The airstrip near Agana was extended to 7,000 feet (2,100 m), with the orientation shifted slightly to avoid Mount Barrigada, and a second runway was added. The first planes landed there on 22 October. A third airstrip, north of Agana Field, became Depot and later Harmon Field. The 7,000-by-150-foot (2,134 by 46 m) was sealed with two inches of asphalt concrete and 12,000 feet (3,700 m) of taxiway was constructed. The first Boeing B-29 Superfortress bombers landed there on 24 November.

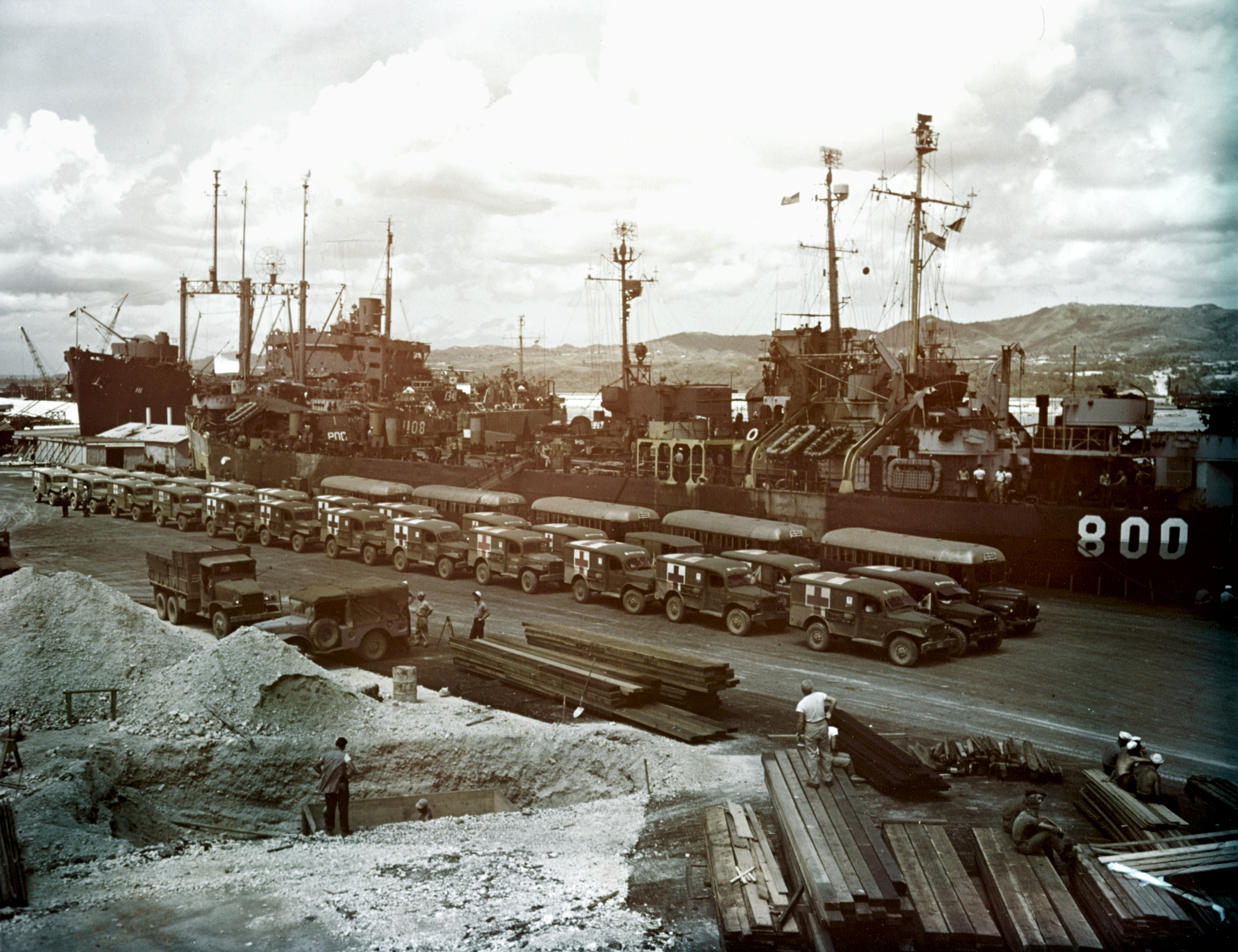
U.S. Navy ambulances lined, awaiting arrival of the hospital ship USS Tranquility with survivors of the sunken USS Indianapolis. Note construction supplies in foreground, and ships beyond, including USS LST-800, LST-1108 and USS St. George.

Two B-29 airfields, North Field and Northwest Fields, were built by army aviation engineer battalions. North Field was commissioned on 3 February 1945, and the first B-29 raid from Guam was launched from there on 24 February. A second runway was operational by April. The south runway at Northwest Field became operational on 1 June, and the north runway on 1 July. The Seabees and army engineers also built the Naval Base Hospital, Fleet Hospitals 103 and 115, and the Army's 373rd Station Hospital and 204th General Hospital. Their 9,000 beds were soon used for casualties from the Battle of Iwo Jima.

By August 1945, 201,718 American troops were based on Guam, of which 65,095 were Army and Army Air Forces, 77,911 were Navy, and 58,712 were Marines. The Marines included the 3rd Marine Division and the 6th Marine Division (which had absorbed the 1st Provisional Marine Brigade), which had returned to Guam from Iwo Jima and Okinawa, respectively, in preparation for the invasion of Japan.

Guam remained an important American base after the war. Naval Operating Base, Guam, was redesignated Naval Base Guam, in 1952, and subsequently became a home port for submarines. In 1947, the USAAF transferred Agana Airfield to the United States Navy, and it became Naval Air Station Agana. It was consolidated with neighboring Harmon Air Force Base in 1949, and operated until 1993, when it was closed by the Base Realignment and Closure (BRAC) Commission. North Field became Andersen Air Force Base in 1947. During the Vietnam War, Guam-based Boeing B-52 Stratofortress bombers flew missions over North Vietnam. Guam hosted 100,000 Vietnamese refugees in 1975, and 6,600 Kurdish refugees in 1996. In 2009, U.S. Naval Base Guam and Andersen Air Force Base became part of Joint Region Marianas, and in 2020, they were joined by a third, newly created installation, Marine Corps Base Camp Blaz.

=== Civil affairs ===
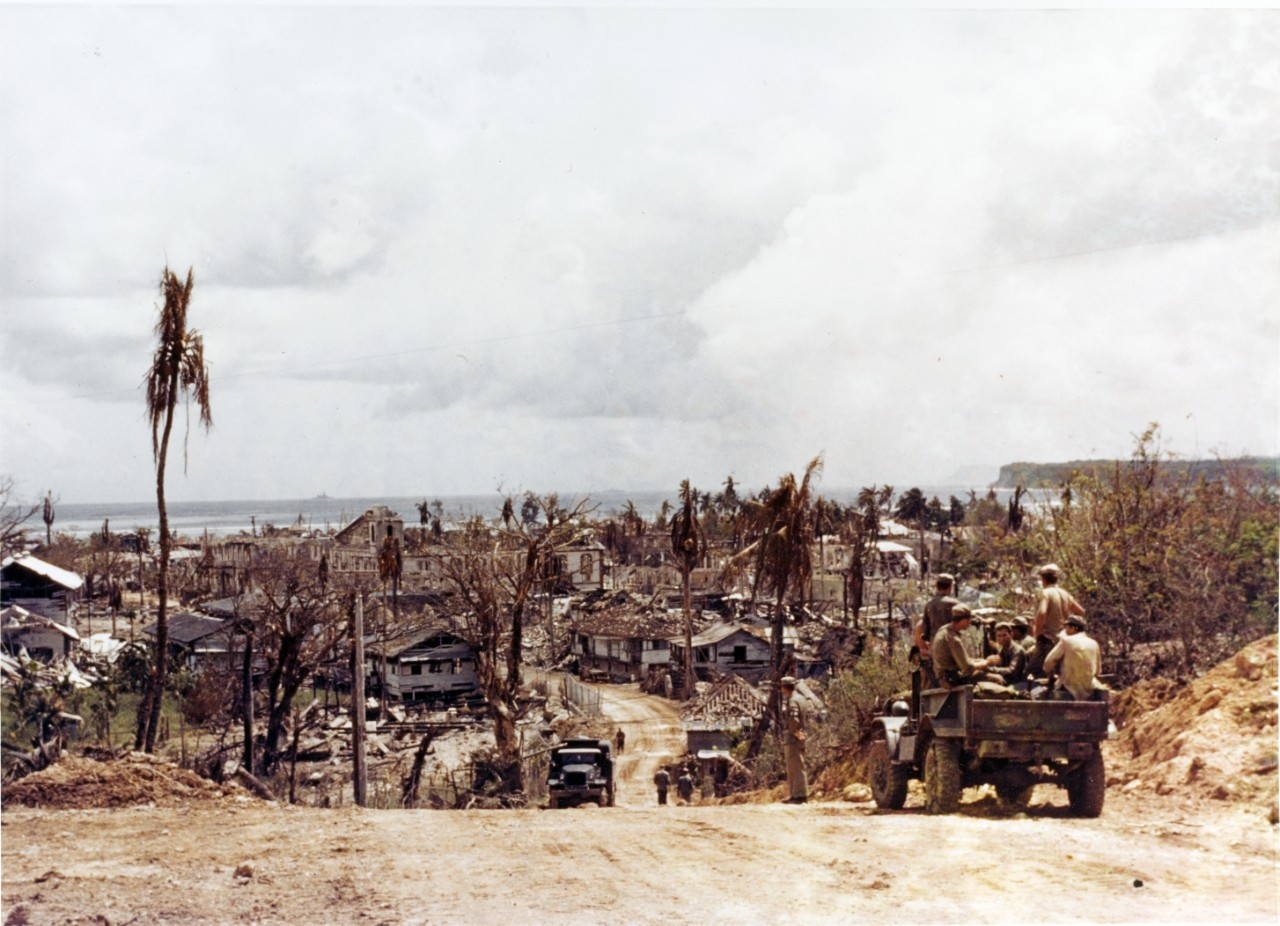
U.S. Marine Corps trucks on a road into Agana, July 1944. The town was heavily damaged during the bombardment that preceded the U.S. Invasion earlier in the month.

Twelve civil affairs officers were attached to the III Amphibious Corps for the Guam operation. A platoon of 50 was assigned to them and given special instruction. Requisitions were placed for civil affairs relief stores, including two thousand shelter tents, tarpaulins, canned milk, rice and tools, but they had a low priority, and were stored deep in ships' holds. By the time the stores reached the beaches, the battle was moving north, and thousands of civilians had made their way to the American lines. On 31 July, the 77th Infantry Division overran the main camps. The guards were killed or fled.

A camp for civilians was established in the ruined town of Agat on 25 July, but due to the lack of room, the civilians there were moved to a new location further south on 30 July. By 5 August the camp held 6,689 inhabitants. Another camp was established on the outskirts of Agana on 1 August, and a third for 4,000 refugees at the former Japanese concentration camp at Manenggon. Refugees were fed using captured Japanese supplies, which included 85.7 short tons (77.7 t) of rice, 185 US gallons (700 L) of soy sauce, 150 cases of canned noodles and 500 cases of tinned fish. By mid-August, the camps held 18,000 Chamorros.

Guamanian women washing laundry in a stream

Many civilians were in need of medical attention; malnutrition was common and many of the civilians had ailments resulting from vitamin deficiencies, and many were wounded from the fighting, but no medical stores had been earmarked for civilian use in the assault phase. The Army supplied tentage for a 100-bed medical facility the Civil Affairs Section acquired from the hospital ship USS Bountiful, but this was inadequate. There were also some Japanese, Saipanese and Rotanese civilians on Guam. Although a few committed suicide, most were captured when the Yigo area was overrun. They were interned with the Japanese prisoners of war. Most were deported after the war, but some were released.

Guanamians were granted citizenship of the United States on 1 August 1950. Guam ceased to be administered by the Navy and was transferred to the Department of the Interior as an unincorporated territory with its own elected governor. Nimitz proclaimed 21 July would henceforth be celebrated as Liberation Day. It continues to be celebrated on Guam every year.

=== War crimes trials ===
War crimes trials were held on Guam for 144 military and civilian defendants accused of crimes committed in Micronesia. Of these, 136 were found guilty: 111 of murder; five of permitting subordinates to commit atrocities against prisoners of war; 14 of torture, cruelty or maltreatment of prisoners; and two of cannibalism. Thirty-six were condemned to death, but twenty of these sentences were commuted to life imprisonment and one to 16-years imprisonment. Thirteen were hanged.

== Assessment ==
The Battle of Guam was free from the inter-service conflict that had marred the Saipan operation. That it succeeded despite rather than because of the cumbersome command structure was largely attributable to the personalities involved. Nimitz and the Commandant of the Marine Corps, Lieutenant General Alexander Vandegrift, arrived at Apra Harbor on the cruiser USS Indianapolis on 10 August, and Vandegrift spent three days talking to his generals. Although he expressed satisfaction with them, he subsequently elevated Shepherd to the command of the 6th Marine Division, but relieved Turnage of his command. Vandegrift liked to rotate his senior commanders, and Turnage had been in the Pacific for over a year. Moreover, Vandegrift had long-held doubts about Turnage's ability the campaign on Guam did nothing to dispel. Considering the 77th Infantry Division had no previous combat experience, it performed well, and even Smith complimented its training, leadership and morale.

On reflection, Geiger felt landing on two widely separated beaches was a mistake, one he never repeated. The original timetable, with the landing on Guam coming just two days after the one on Saipan was overly optimistic. The decision to delay the operation in the light of improved intelligence was sound, even though it meant loss of physical condition for the Marines cooped up on board transports. The 3rd Marine Division was hampered by poor topographical intelligence, leading to its landing in a natural amphitheater, with high casualties as a consequence.

The Marines praised the naval gunfire support in general and the extended shore bombardment in particular, and the use of star shell for illumination (5,069 of which were fired in this operation). The record on air support was more mixed: the 77th Infantry Division only called in one air strike, but the 3rd Marine Division made considerable use of them, only to become the victim of its own air strikes on four occasions. Geiger recommended Marine Corps squadrons be designated for close air support, operating from escort carriers. The planners were aware the reef would be a problem, and the LVTs proved to be the solution. Due to their high loss rate, more would have been useful.

In 1962, Major General Haruo Unezawa led a Japanese Army team to Guam to conduct a reassessment of the battle from the other side. In their opinion, the most serious error was the failure to send adequate forces to Guam before March 1944. This did not give the defenders enough time to prepare the best possible defense. While the 29th Division fought well, they criticised Takeshina's decision to accept battle on two widely separated fronts rather than concentrating on the vital Apra Harbor area. Counterattacking against a superior American force was ill-advised, and resulted in weakening the Japanese forces. The defenders could have held out longer by staying on the defensive. This might have delayed other American operations, most notably the B-29 raids on the Japanese homeland. The Japanese switched to this immediately after the Battle of Guam, resulting in very costly battles on Peleliu, Iwo Jima and Okinawa.

== Unit awards ==
Presidential Unit Citation:

- 3rd Marines, reinforced
  Consisting of 3rd Marines; 2nd Battalion, 9th Marines; Company C, 3rd Tank Battalion; Company C, 19th Marines; and 3rd Band Section.

Navy Unit Commendations:

- 1st Provisional Marine Brigade
  Consisting of Headquarters Company; Brigade Signal Company; Brigade Military Police Company; 4th Marines, reinforced; 22nd Marines, reinforced; Naval Construction Battalion Maintenance Unit 515; and 4th Platoon, 2nd Marine Ammunition Company.
- 12th Marines
  Including prior service on Bougainville.
- 21st Marines, reinforced
  Consisting of 21st Marines; Company B, 19th Marines; Company B, 3rd Tank Battalion; and 2nd Band Section.
- III Amphibious Corps Signal Battalion
  Including subsequent service on Palau and Okinawa.
- 9th Defense Battalion
  Including prior service on Guadalcanal and New Georgia.

== Medal of Honor recipients ==
There were four Medal of Honor recipients for the Battle of Guam, all marines:

- Captain Louis H. Wilson Jr.
- Private First Class Leonard F. Mason (posthumous)
- Private First Class Luther Skaggs Jr.
- Private First Class Frank P. Witek (posthumous)

== See also ==
- Agana race riot – Violent confrontation between white U.S. Marines and black sailors
- Return to Guam, 1944 documentary and propaganda film about the battle
- The War in the Pacific National Historical Park
