= Operation Beleaguer =

United States military operation

- Part of the Chinese Civil War and the Cold War
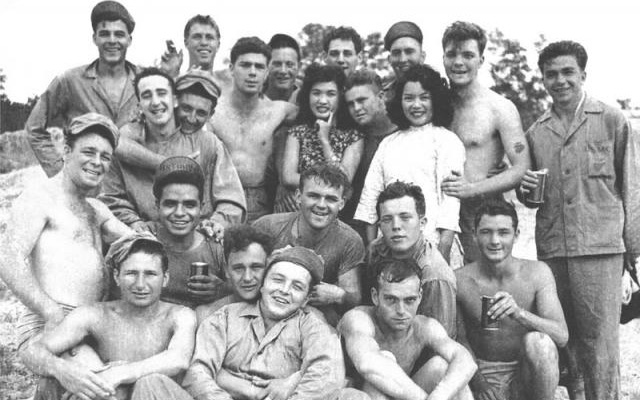
- Marines in Qingdao during Operation Beleaguer
Date	10 August 1945 – 7 December 1949
Location	Hebei and Shandong provinces, China
Result	US repatriates Japanese and Korean citizens from northern China but is unsuccessful in helping the Nationalist government retake territory in China previously held by Japan

Belligerents
United States; Republic of China	PRC; Communist China

Commanders and leaders
Albert C. Wedemeyer; Alvan C. Gillem, Jr.; Keller E. Rockey; Dewitt Peck; Samuel L. Howard; Thomas C. Kinkaid	Mao Zedong; Zhou Enlai

Units involved
United States Marine Corps; III Amphibious Corps; Marine Forces, China; Fleet Marine Force, Western Pacific; United States Navy; 7th Fleet; Naval Construction Battalions; Underwater Demolition Teams; United States Air Force; 14th Air Force	8th Route Army

Strength
50,000	Unknown

Casualties and losses
13 killed 43 wounded 7 captured 22 died in accidents	Unknown

Operation Beleaguer was the codename for the United States Marine Corps' occupation of northeastern China's Hebei and Shandong provinces from 1945 until 1949. The Marines were tasked with overseeing the repatriation of more than 600,000 Japanese and Koreans who remained in China at the end of World War II. During the four-year occupation, American forces engaged in several skirmishes with the People's Liberation Army, while successfully evacuating thousands of foreign nationals. The United States government attempted to mediate a peace treaty between the opposing Nationalist and Communist factions, but was unsuccessful. The Marines departed northern China in June 1949, a few months before the communists won the Chinese Civil War and took control of mainland China.

== Background ==
During World War II, China was a battlefield with three opposing states: the Nationalist government's National Revolutionary Army (NRA), the Communist People's Liberation Army (PLA), (Note: Technically, the Communist forces would not use the name of the "People's Liberation Army" until February 1947.) and the China Expeditionary Army of the Imperial Japanese Army (IJA), which occupied northeast China south of the Great Wall and the Kwantung Army of the IJA in Manchukuo which occupied northeast China north of the Great Wall. China already destroyed the Japanese Burma Area Army on its southwest border in 1944-1945. When Japan surrendered in 1945, over 630,000 Japanese and Koreans (Note: The IJN started including Koreans among its ranks after Japan only started force conscripting Koreans in December 1944, as Korea was a Japanese colony, however, Korean civilian contractors were killed by Chinese in the Tongzhou nassacre and Korean comfort women were stationed in China since the war began) (Korean comfort women) of the China Expeditionary Army were still in the occupied cities in the northeast like Hebei and needed to be disarmed and repatriated. The Soviet army dealt with the other million strong Japanese army, the 665,500 Japanese troops of the Kwantung Army in Manchukuo and 335,900 Japanese troops in North Korea during the Soviet invasion of Manchuria and Soviet invasion of North Korea, which was a separate entity from the Japanese China Expedtitionary Army which only operated in Mengjiang and south of the Great Wall. The Soviets committed massacre and rapes in their occupation zone against Japanese and Koreans. The Nationalist government based in Chongqing, though, lacked the time and means of transport to disarm the entire China Expeditionary Army of the IJA in the timespan of a few weeks. They feared that PLA soldiers and guerrillas, who often operated behind Japanese lines, would be able to reach and disarm large numbers of IJA units before the NRA arrived. Chiang Kai-shek and the Western Allies ordered that IJA units remain at their posts and not surrender their arms to the Communists. The Chinese Nationalists disarmed the other Japanese soldiers of the China Expeditionary Army in provinces outside of Hebei and Shandong like Hubei, Jiangsu while the US disarmed Japanese specifically only in Hebei and Shandong. The Nationalist Chinese also disarmed Japanese soldiers of the Southern Expeditionary Army Group in North Vietnam during the Chinese occupation of northern Vietnam, 1945–1946. President Harry Truman sent over 50,000 United States Marines of the III Amphibious Corps (IIIAC) and the 7th Fleet to northern China with orders to accept the surrender of the Japanese and their Korean former subjects, repatriate them, and help the Nationalists reassert their control over areas previously held by the Japanese. The Marines were not to take sides in the fighting and were only allowed to engage in combat if fired upon first. Major General Keller E. Rockey, IIIAC, was placed in command of the operation, and Lieutenant General Albert C. Wedemeyer was in command of the China Theater.

IIIAC was preparing for the invasion of Japan when the war ended on September 2, 1945. Within the next 48 hours, IIIAC received new orders to ship out to China.

== Operations ==
=== Hebei Province ===
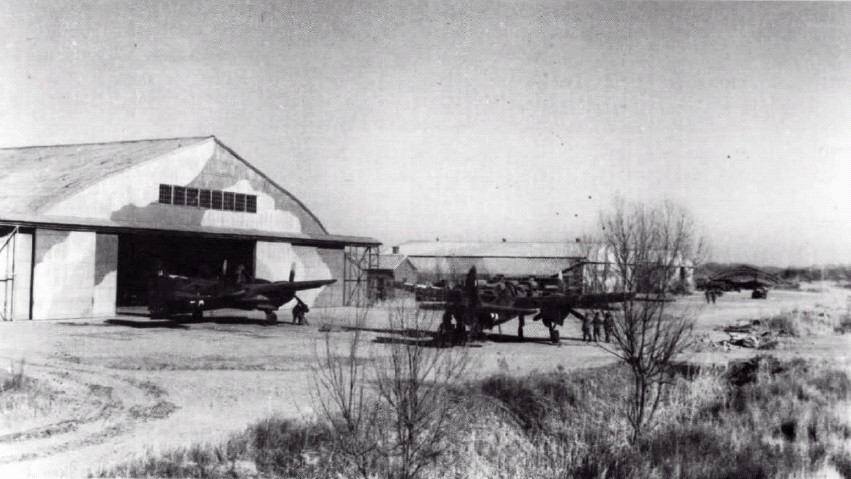
A Marine Corps Grumman F7F-3N Tigercat at Beijing's Nan Yuan Airfield in December 1945

The Hebei Province occupation force was the first to get underway. Loading of the troopships began on September 11 and was completed on September 19. Sailing from their base on Guam, the Americans anchored off the bay of China's Hai River on September 30. Disembarkation began soon after, and the Americans were greeted by swarms of sampans, whose crews were eager for trade, and crowds of jubilant Chinese on the shore. Brigadier General Louis R. Jones, assistant division commander of the 1st Division, landed at the Tanggu docks to meet with local Chinese port officials, make arrangements for the surrender of the Japanese garrison, and prepare for the dispersal of the Marines across the province. Everything went according to plan; Jones later said that the "Chinese military and civilian authorities were cooperative in the extreme," and that his men and he had no trouble whatsoever in dealing with the Japanese garrison.

The Americans who went to occupy Tianjin were also greeted by crowds of Chinese who were anxious to be liberated from the Japanese. According to author Henry I. Shaw, Jr., the "streets were packed with Chinese of all classes and European expatriates. Trucks and marching troops literally had to force their way through the happy, flag-waving throngs to reach their assigned billets in the former International Concessions. To many of the men, it seemed that their welcome must have outshone and outshouted 'any welcome given to troops any time, any place, and anywhere during World War II.'"

The first element of IIIAC to see action in China was the 1st Battalion, 7th Marines, although it did not actually participate in the fighting. On October 1, 1st Battalion, under Lieutenant Colonel John J. Gormley, sailed from Taku to the port of Qinhuangdao. Since "all factions, civilian and military, were anxious to cooperate with [American] troops," Colonel Gormley was able to stop the fighting by ordering the "puppet troops" to remove themselves from the town's perimeter defenses, and by placing his own men along the frontline. Cooperation between the Americans and the Communists did not last long, however. According to Shaw, the Communists were sabotaging railroads leading into Qinhuangdao and ambushing American-held trains by the end of the month. Before long, Qinhuangdao would prove to be one of the centers for Communist resistance to the American occupation.

Most of the Japanese military personnel in Hebei Province surrendered to Allied forces within days of the Americans' arrival in country. On October 6, General Rockey accepted the surrender of 50,000 Japanese at Tianjin. Four days later, an additional 50,000 Japanese surrendered to General Lien Ching-sun, Chiang Kai-shek's personal representative in northern China. Most of the Japanese were concentrated in bivouacs and barracks near the coast; however, due to a shortage of manpower, the Japanese in many of their outlying positions were ordered to remain on guard duty until they could be relieved by Chinese Nationalists or by the Marines.

The first skirmish between American and Communist forces occurred on October 6, 1945, along the Tianjin–Beijing road, barely a week after the Marines arrived in China. On the day before, a reconnaissance patrol traveling down the road found thirty-six unguarded roadblocks, which made the road impassable to anything larger than a Jeep. Accordingly, a detail of engineers and a platoon of riflemen was sent to clear the road. At a point about 22 miles (35 km) miles northwest of Tianjin, the engineers were attacked by an estimated forty to fifty Communist soldiers. After a brief firefight, the Americans were forced to retreat with three wounded. On the following day, another detail of engineers was sent out with the same objective as before, but this time they were protected by a company of riflemen, a company of tanks, and carrier-borne aircraft. However, the Communists did not attack, and the Americans were successful in reopening the road to Beijing. A large convoy of ninety-five vehicles and several hundred Americans traversed the road without incident shortly thereafter and met up with the American forces who had reached Peking via railroad. A patrol was also established in order to keep the Tianjin-Beijing road open.

By October 30, all major 1st Marine Division units were ashore. The Peking Group, under the command of General Louis R. Jones, and built around the 5th Marine Regiment, set up base in the old Legation Quarter, and placed a rifle company at both of the city's airfields.

Flight echelons were sent to their assigned airfields at Qingdao, Beijing, and Tianjin, as facilities were readied for them, but American air cover was severely limited during the first few months of the occupation. This was mainly due to Typhoon Louise that ravaged Okinawa between October 9 and October 11, 1945. A large portion of the wing's equipment was stopped in Okinawa while en route to China, and it was damaged by the strong winds. The 50,000 men of the 92nd and 94th Chinese Nationalist Armies (CNA) were airlifted to Beijing from central and southern China by the 14th Air Force between October 6 and October 29. The 92nd CNA remained in the Beijing area while the 94th CNA moved to Tianjin, Tanggu, Tangshan and Qinhuangdao.

According to Shaw, the arrival of the CNA in Hebei may have made the Communists' 8th Route Army wary, although it did not stop it from raiding and ambushing the Americans, or from sabotaging railroads and bridges. Shaw says that "[t]he III [Amphibious] Corps' first month in China revealed the pattern of future months which stretched into years. Set down in the midst of a fratricidal war with ambiguous instructions to abstain from active participation while 'cooperating' with [Nationalist] forces, the Marines walked a tightrope to maintain the illusion of friendly neutrality."

In late 1945, Chiang Kai-shek was preparing for a campaign to take control of Manchuria. In November, General Wedemeyer, the commander of the China Theater, who also served as a military advisor to Chiang Kai-shek, warned the Nationalist leader to secure his hold on the vital provinces of northeastern China, before entering Manchuria. However, in order to do this, the Nationalists required an "overwhelmingly superior" force. As result, Nationalist troops who had been stationed in Hebei and Shandong Provinces were sent into battle, leaving large areas of the said provinces unprotected from Communist guerrillas. Shortly after, the Communists had taken control of the areas previously held by the Nationalists. Shaw says that the "Nationalist's premature Manchuria operation contained within it the seeds of Nationalist destruction, and they ripened in a few short and bloody years into total defeat."

=== Shandong Province ===
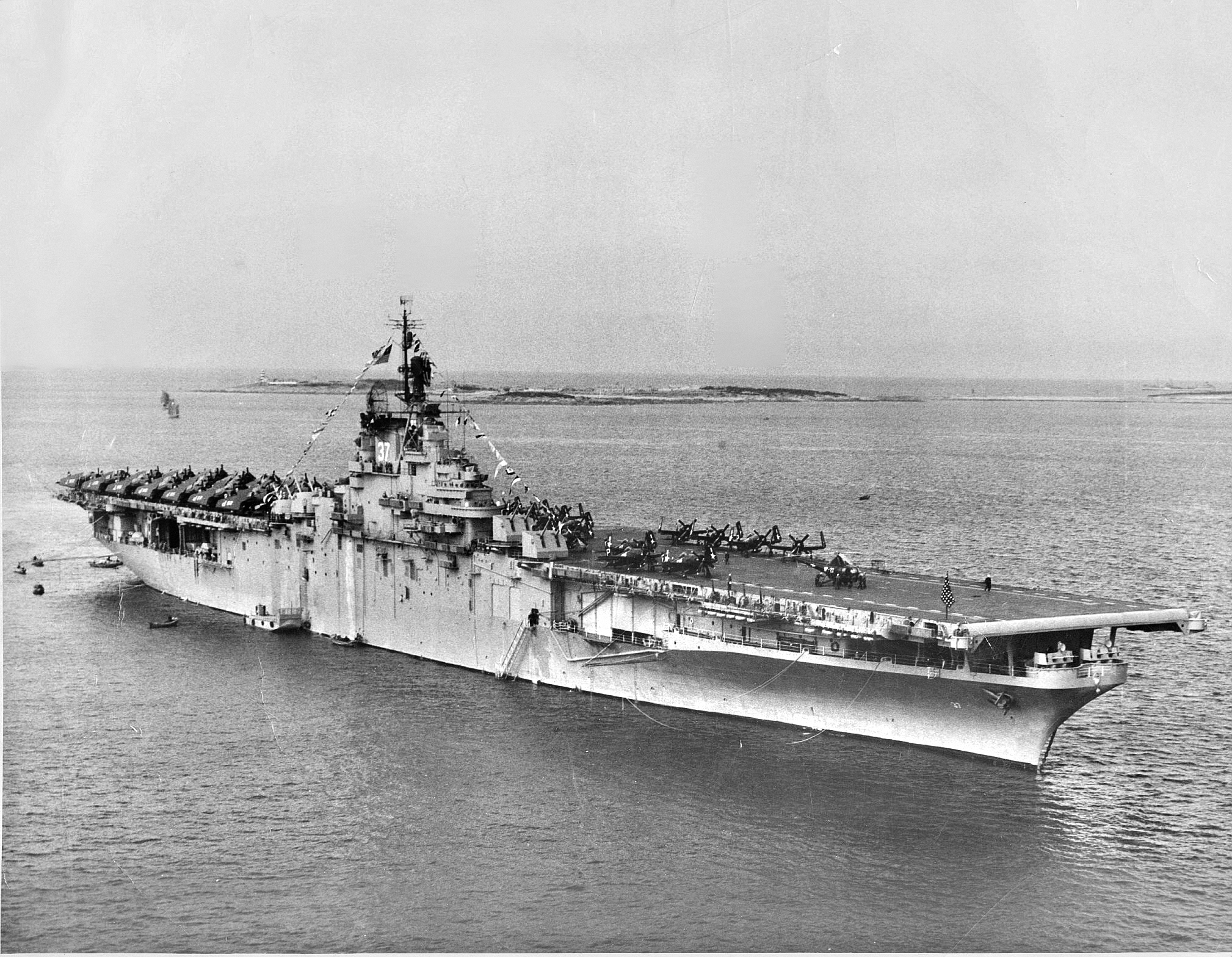
USS Princeton off Qingdao in 1948

The situation in Shandong Province was different from that of Hebei. In Shandong, the Communists controlled most of the countryside and the coast, and they were also stronger in numbers than in Hebei, where there was a growing Nationalist presence. According to Shaw, "Qingdao remained a Nationalist island in a Communist sea." The Japanese held the railroad leading from Qingdao into the interior.

Immediately after General Rockey accepted the surrender of Japanese forces in the Tianjin area, he left for Yantai with the 29th Marine Regiment, 6th Division, to investigate conditions at that port. However, when he arrived, Rockey found that Communist troops had already taken control of the city from the Japanese and installed a new mayor. Admiral Thomas C. Kinkaid, commander of the United States Navy's 7th Fleet, sent a message to the Chinese commander requesting that he withdraw his men from Yantai before the Marines land. Following a conference on October 7, 1945, with the Communist mayor of Yantai, who asked for withdrawal terms that were unacceptable to the Americans, Vice Admiral Daniel E. Barbey, commander of VII Amphibious Force (VIIAF), recommended that the landing be postponed. Rockey agreed, so the 29th Marines were ordered to land with the rest of the 6th Division at Qingdao on October 11, instead of going in ahead.

According to Shaw, on the day of the landing, "the 6th Reconnaissance Company [landed first and] moved through the crowded streets, lined with a cheering, flag-waving throng, to secure [Cangkou] airfield," which was located about 10 miles (16 km) from the city. On the following day, observation planes from the escort carrier USS Bougainville landed safely at the field, and by October 16 all of the Marines had been put ashore and assigned to billets.

=== Combat ===
==== Kuyeh incident ====
One of the more notable skirmishes between American and Communist forces became known as the Guye Incident. On November 14, a train carrying General Dewitt Peck, 7th Marine Regiment, and an inspection party consisting of Marines was fired on near the village of Guye, while it was traveling from Tangshan to Qinhuangdao. An indecisive battle ensued. For over three hours the Marines exchanged fire with the Communists, who were positioned around the village, about 500 yards (460 m) north of the railroad tracks. Chinese fire from the village was so intense at one point the Americans called in air support. However, because the Marine aircraft could not clearly identify enemy targets, and because there was a risk of harming innocent civilians, permission to open fire was not given. Therefore, the aircraft flew over the Communists, but they did not actually fire on them. Later that day, a company from the 7th Marines was sent to reinforce the ambushed train. Men of the company found that the resistance had "melted away," so General Peck's train proceeded into Guye after nightfall. There were no casualties among the Marines. Chinese casualties, if any, are unknown.

On the next day, Peck's train was ambushed again in the same area as before. This time, the Chinese had torn up about 400 yards (370 m) of the railroad tracks, and the workers sent to fix them had been killed or wounded by land mines. Since it was expected that repair work on the railroad would take at least two days, Peck returned to Tangshan and boarded an observation plane, in order to fly to Qinhuangdao. Even before taking on these new responsibilities, the 7th Marines was short on manpower. As a result, 1st Battalion, 29th Marines, 6th Division, was transferred from Qingdao to Hebei and placed under the 7th Marines' operational control.

==== Beidaihe and Anping ====
Another serious incident occurred in July 1946. On July 7, the Chinese Communist Party issued a statement regarding their displeasure with the United States' policy toward China, and shortly thereafter, Communists troops launched two minor attacks against American forces. The first skirmish occurred on July 13, when the Communists ambushed and then captured seven Marines who were guarding a bridge about 15 miles (24 km) from Beidaihe. After some negotiation, the Marines were released unharmed on July 24, but in return the Communists asked for an apology from the United States government for invading a "liberated area." However, the United States responded with a "strong protest" instead.

Five days later, on July 29, 1946, a routine motor patrol (made up from B Battery, 11th Marines and a mortar squad from the 5th Marine Regiment)_{,} consisting of one lieutenant and forty enlisted men, was ambushed near the village of Anping. The ensuing battle lasted four hours. A relief column with air support from Tianjin attempted to trap and destroy the Communists, but it failed to arrive in time. Three Marines (Lt. Douglas Cowin, Cpl Gilbert Tate, and PFC Larry Punch) were killed and twelve others were wounded during what was, up to that point, the most serious clash between American and Chinese forces. One other Marine, PFC John Lopez, later died of wounds received in the battle, and two more were injured when they crashed their Jeep while returning to Tianjin for aid. According to Shaw, "the deliberate Communist ambush was additional proof that the chances for peace in China were nonexistent. Without regard to their truce agreements, both sides initiated hostilities wherever the military situation seemed to favor them, and 'each side took the stand with General Marshall that the other was provoking the fighting and could not be trusted to go through with an agreement.'"

==== Xinhe ====
Two small skirmishes occurred at Xinhe during the operation. Located 6 miles (9.7 km) northwest of Tanggu, Xinhe was the site of one of 1st Division's ammunition stores. On the night of October 3, 1946, a party of Communist raiders snuck into the ammunition dump to steal some of the munitions. However, a sentry from the 1st Battalion, 5th Marines, guard detachment discovered the break-in and opened fire on the raiders. Soon after, a rescue party of Marines in a truck was dispatched to the scene, but it was ambushed and the Marines inside were forced to dismount and form a firing line. The body of one raider was also found. One Marine was wounded.

The second engagement at Xinhe occurred on the night of April 4–5, 1947, and it would be the last major clash between American and Communist forces during Operation Beleaguer. A party of Communist raiders with an estimated strength of 350 men made a "planned and coordinated attack" on three isolated points of the dump's perimeter.

A column of Marines in vehicles was sent to aid the garrison of the besieged ammunition dump, but the lead vehicle of the convoy was disabled by land mines, forcing the Americans to dismount and engage the ambushers. According to Shaw, the Communists closed to within grenade range before being beaten back. Having delayed the American reinforcements, the Communists were able to haul away a large amount of ammunition, and explode two other piles of ammunition. Altogether, the Americans suffered five dead and sixteen wounded, making it, from the American perspective, "the worst incident in the history of strained relations between the Marines and the [Chinese] Communists." The bodies of six uniformed Communists were found, and an estimated 20 to 30 wounded men were carried off by their comrades. A couple of weeks later, on April 21, control of the ammunition dump was handed over to the Nationalists.

=== Mediation ===
By this time, about half of the 630,000 Japanese and Koreans in China had been repatriated. Chiang Kai-shek wanted the stores of weapons and ammunition that had been taken from the Japanese by the Americans, so he could use them for his campaign to take Manchuria. General Wedemeyer, however, refused to give the Nationalists control of the weapons until they assumed control of the repatriation program, as previously arranged. When the Nationalists did finally take control of repatriating the Japanese, the American forces involved became the supervisors of the effort, with the job of overlooking the processing, staging, and loading out the repatriates onto ships. Additionally, the Marines also continued to furnish guard details for American-crewed repatriation ships. Once all of the repatriation operations were finished in the summer of 1946, and when the attempt to mediate a peace treaty proved futile, the objective of IIIAC Marines changed to the traditional task of protecting American lives and property, like the old China Marines.

=== Troop reduction ===
On April 1, 1946, when the reorganization at Qingdao was finished, the remaining elements of the 6th Marine Division officially became the 3rd Marine Brigade. The 1st Marine Division completed its last ordered deactivation on April 15, and the IIIAC staff and units were reduced to skeleton strength. At this point, most of the Marines who had been in China since the beginning of the occupation had been repatriated, and the remaining 25,000 Americans in China were mostly inexperienced and badly in need of training. As result, the American commanders set up a school in China, where many of the Marines received "on the job" training.

=== Withdrawal ===
Between August and early September, the Nationalists took control of the Tangshan coal fields, which were vital in keeping Chinese cities from collapsing, and the railroad between Beijing and Qinhuangdao, both of which were previously guarded by marines. As result, General Rockey was able to withdraw from the interior and concentrate his forces within major cities. After the concentration of his forces, Rockey focused on his training program that was meant to maintain IIIAC's high state of combat readiness, and preparing for departure, which would take place over the next several months. The 7th Marines, reinforced by 3rd Battalion, 11th Marines, were moved to the Beidaihe-Qinhuangdao area, while division headquarters, the "special troops" of the 1st Marines, and the remainder of the 11th Marines took up station at Tianjin. Rockey was finally relieved of command on September 18, 1946, and replaced by Major General Samuel L. Howard, who would manage most of the withdrawal.

American forces were withdrawn from Hebei Province between April and May 1947. After that, efforts to evacuate American and other foreign nationals were centered around Qingdao, which was under the control of Brigadier General Omar T. Pfeiffer and his men. One infantry battalion, based at Qingdao, was reserved for operations to protect American lives and property in Hebei, but it would only be deployed if needed. In the fall of 1948, the economic and military collapse of the Nationalists, predicted by General Wedemeyer, Marshall and others, came about in Manchuria. According to Shaw, "In a few short months, the Communists captured vast quantities of munitions and absorbed thousands of defecting Nationalist troops, who had lost all desire to fight. In the cities of South and Central China, the pauperized populace, led by agitators, became increasingly more dissatisfied with its lot of continuous war and gave strong evidence that it would accept any change which promised peace."

=== American casualties ===
In total, thirteen Marines were killed and forty-three wounded in clashes with Communist forces during Operation Beleaguer. Twenty-two Marine aircrew members in fourteen aircraft perished during the same period.

Action	Date	Killed	Wounded	Unit
Near Tianjin	October 6, 1945	0	3	1st Marines
Near Tangshan	October 19, 1945	0	2	7th Marines
Near Beijing	October 23, 1945	0	1	5th Marines
Near Anshan	December 4, 1945	1	1	7th Marines
Tianjin	December 9, 1945	0	1	
Near Tangshan	January 15, 1946	0	2	5th Marines
Near Lutai	April 7, 1946	1	0	
Near Tanggu	May 5, 1946	0	1	5th Marines
Lutai	May 7, 1946	0	1	7th Marines
Near Tianjin	May 21, 1946	1	1	1st Marines
Tanggu	July 2, 1946	0	1	
Anping	July 29, 1946	4	11	11th Marines
Xinhe	October 3, 1946	0	1	1st Marines
Xinhe	April 4–5, 1947	5	17	1st Marines
Near Tianjin	December 25, 1947	1	0	

== Gallery ==
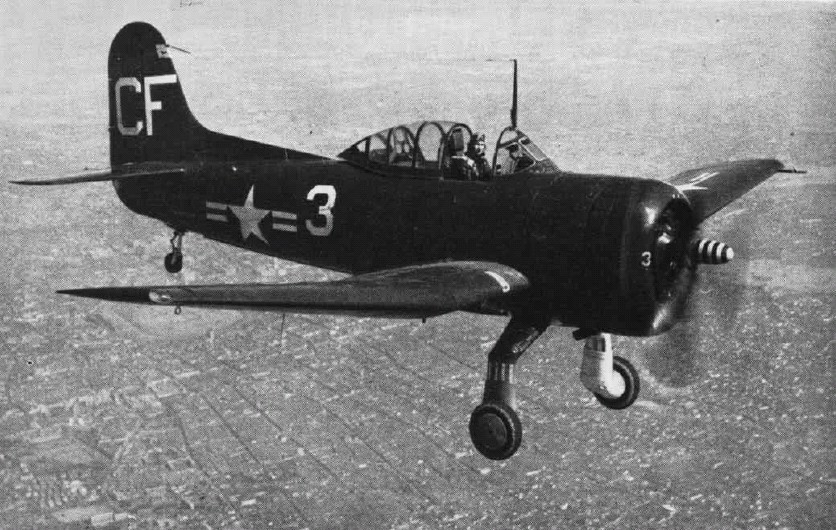
A United States Navy Curtiss SC-1 Seahawk scout plane over Shanghai in 1948. This aircraft was assigned to the cruiser USS Duluth. It was transported through the streets of Shanghai and fitted with landing gear instead of its normal floats.

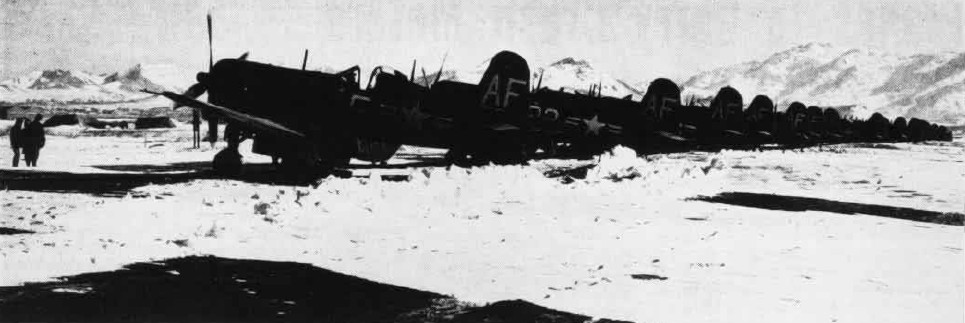
Marine F4U-4 Corsairs at Qingdao in early 1948.

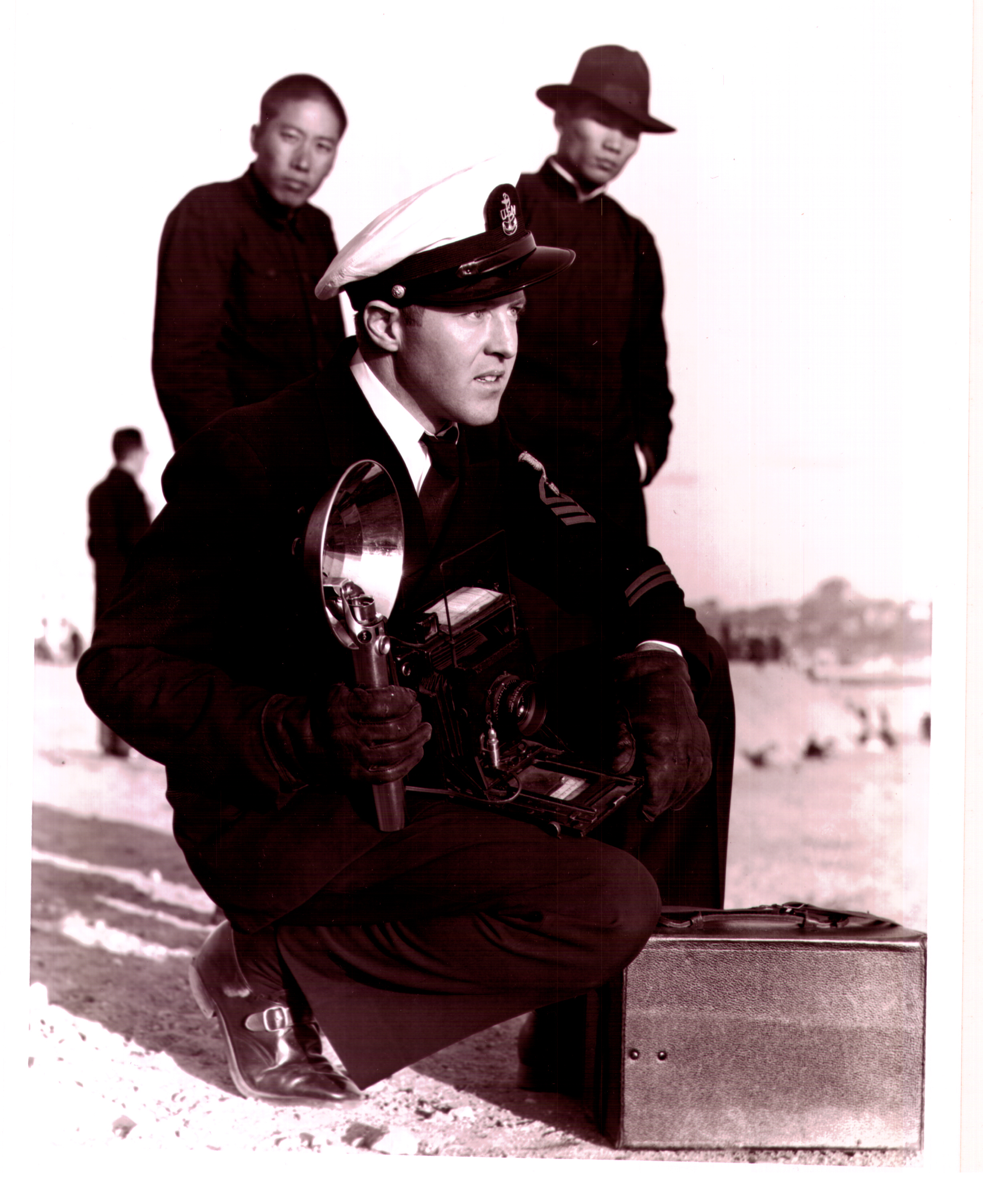
Gerald P. Pulley in Qingdao in 1949.

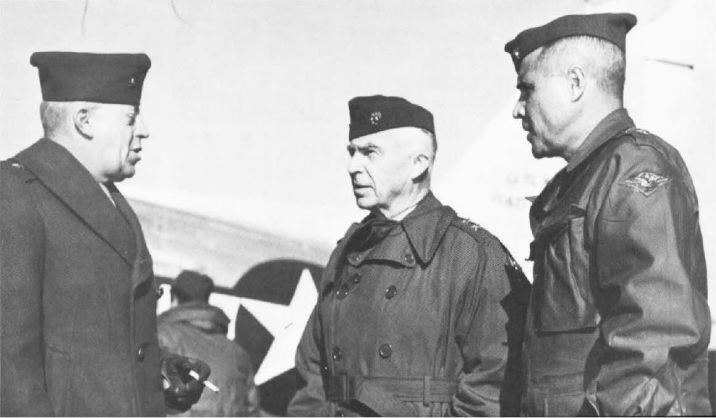
Brigadier general Merritt A. Edson, Commanding General Service Command Fleet Marine Force Pacific, Major general DeWitt Peck (CG 1st Marine Division), Louis E. Woods (CG 1st Marine Aircraft Wing), Tianjin, September 1945.

== See also ==
- Amethyst Incident – Chinese civil war incident
- Gene Hackman – American actor (1930–2025) who served in Operation Beleaguer
- Japanese repatriation from Huludao – 1945–1948 China to Japan return movement
- List of United States Interventions in China
- Military history of the United States during World War II
- Occupation of Japan – Post-World War II occupation of Japan
- Operation Blacklist Forty – 1945–1948 US occupation of Korea
- Outline of the Chinese Civil War
- Outline of the military history of the People's Republic of China
- Sino-American Cooperative Organization – World War II intelligence organisation
- War in Vietnam (1945-1946) – Prelude to the Indochina Wars (1946–1991)
- Yangtze Patrol – Naval operation to protect Americans' interests in China, 1854–1949
