= Keller E. Rockey =

United States Marine general (1888–1970)

Keller Emrick Rockey
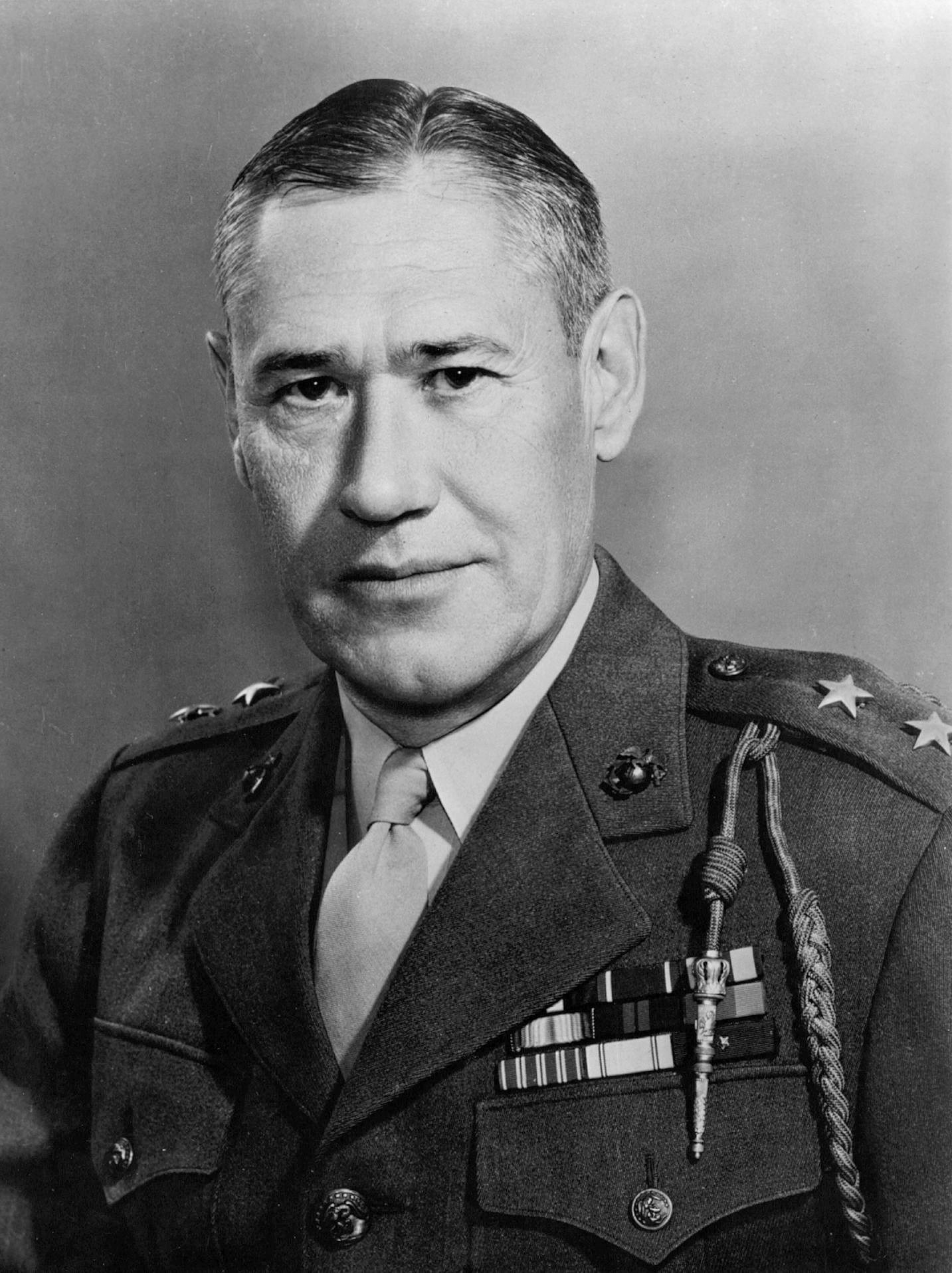
- Lieutenant General Keller E. Rockey
- Born: September 27, 1888; Columbia City, Indiana, U.S.
- Died: June 6, 1970 (aged 81); Harwich Port, Massachusetts, U.S.
- Burial place: Arlington National Cemetery
- Military career
- Allegiance: United States of America
- Branch: United States Marine Corps
- Service years: 1913–1950
- Rank: Lieutenant General
- Commands: Assistant Commandant of the Marine Corps; 5th Marine Division; III Amphibious Corps; Fleet Marine Force, Atlantic
- Conflicts: World War I; Western Front; Occupation of Nicaragua; World War II; Battle of Iwo Jima; Chinese Civil War; Operation Beleaguer
- Awards: Navy Cross (2); Distinguished Service Cross; Distinguished Service Medal (Navy); Distinguished Service Medal (Army); French Fourragère

Keller Emrick Rockey (September 27, 1888 – June 6, 1970) was a highly decorated lieutenant general in the United States Marine Corps, who commanded the Fifth Marine Division in the Battle of Iwo Jima during World War II and the Third Amphibious Corps during the occupation of North China following the war.

For outstanding services with the Third Amphibious Corps, he was awarded the Army Distinguished Service Medal, and for exceptionally meritorious service with the Fifth Marine Division, he was awarded the Navy Distinguished Service Medal. The citation for the latter reads in part:

... in a position of great responsibility as Commanding General of the Fifth Marine Division prior to and during the seizure of enemy-held Iwo Jima from February 19 to March 26, 1945 ... Major General Rockey skillfully welded the new and untried Division into a formidable fighting command.

... a bold tactician, he landed his forces at the base of Mount Suribachi. Deploying his units according to plan, he quickly cut the island in two. Directing the assault with superb generalship he moved his forces inexorably forward and captured the mountain. Continuing his attack to the north, he waged furious battle until he had succeeded in annihilating the last pocket of Japanese resistance.

== Early life and career ==
Keller Rockey was born September 27, 1888, in Columbia City, Indiana. He was a graduate of Gettysburg College with a Bachelor of Science degree in 1909, and was a forestry student at Yale University. He was commissioned a second lieutenant in the Marine Corps, November 18, 1913.

His first duty assignment as a Marine Corps junior officer was a student under instruction at the Officers Basic School, Norfolk, Virginia. Following graduation there in May, 1915, he went to sea; first as a member of the Marine Detachment aboard USS Nebraska, then a member of the Marine detachment aboard USS Nevada.

== World War I ==
Following sea service, Rockey sailed for France in June 1917, and one year later, as a member of the Fifth Marine Regiment, participated in the Aisne-Marne Defensive (Château-Thierry).

He was awarded the Navy Cross for his actions at Château-Thierry where, on July 6, 1918, he performed distinguished service by bringing up supports and placing them in the front lines at great personal exposure, showing exceptional ability and extraordinary heroism.

Rockey also received the Distinguished Service Cross and was cited in the General Orders of the Second Division, American Expeditionary Forces. He was entitled to wear the French Fourragère.

== Interwar years ==
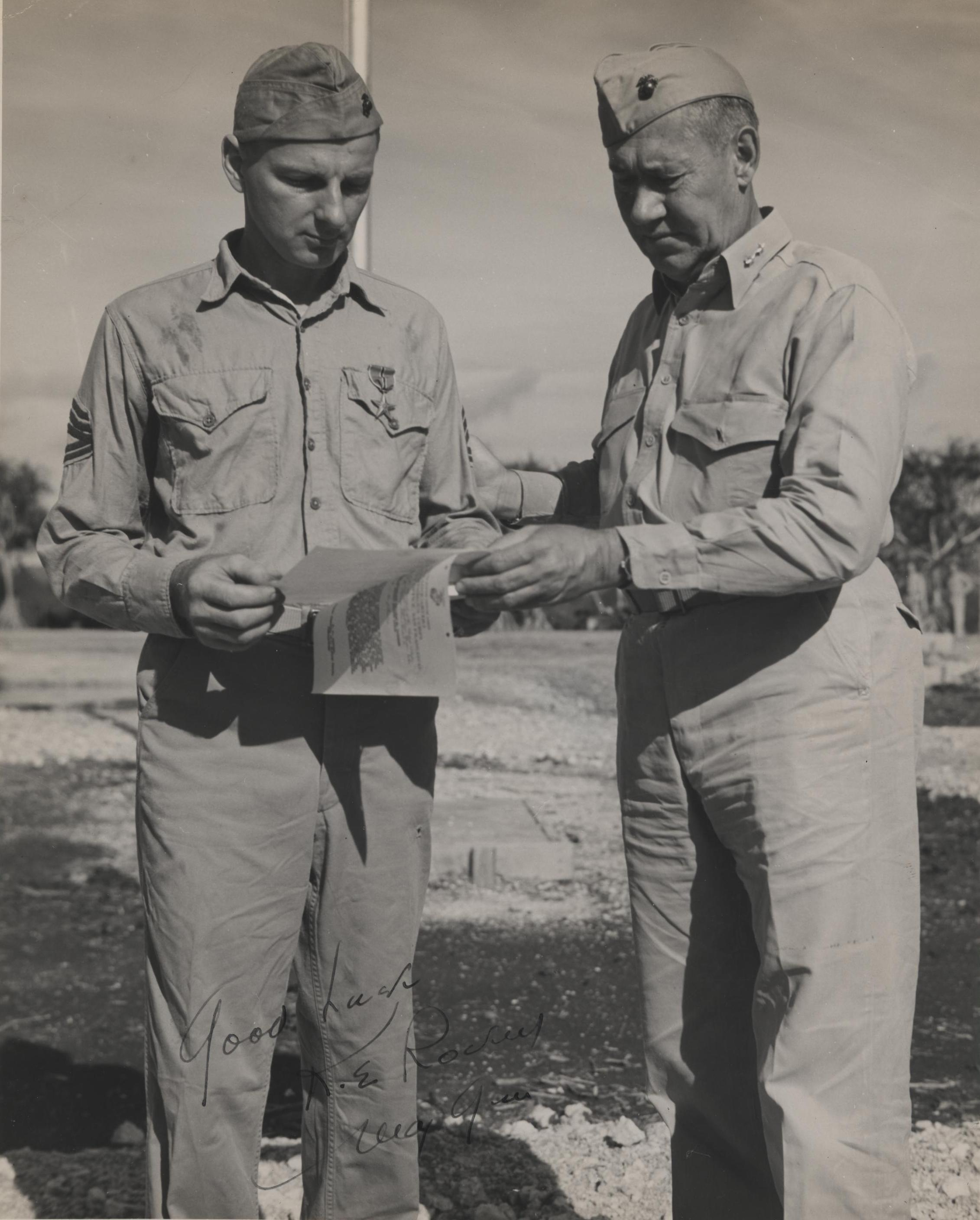
Rockey (right) decorated SSgt. William H. T. Swisher with Bronze Star Medal, Guam, 1944.

Shortly after returning to the United States in 1919, Rockey went to foreign shore duty in Haiti as a member of the Haitian Constabulary, where he remained until 1921, then returned to this country to join Marine Barracks, Washington, D.C.

Following duty at Headquarters Marine Corps, Washington, D.C., he became a student in the Field Officers' Course, Marine Corps Schools, MCB Quantico, Virginia. After graduation in July 1925, he was again assigned to school, this time as a student at the Command and General Staff School, Fort Leavenworth, Kansas. Upon graduation in June 1926, he became an instructor in the Department of Tactics, Marine Corps Schools.

From January to November 1928, he was commanding officer, First Battalion, Eleventh Artillery Regiment, Second Marine Brigade, stationed in Nicaragua, where he was awarded a Gold Star in lieu of a second Navy Cross for outstanding services.

Rockey next became Base Intelligence, Operations and Training Officer of the MCB San Diego, California, and later Chief of Staff of the Base.

In June 1934, he was assigned to duty as chief of the War Plans Division, Marine Corps Headquarters, following which he became Force Marine Officer, U.S. Battle Force aboard the USS California.

He returned to Washington in July 1939, to assume duties with Operations, Navy Department (War Plans) and in August 1941, became chief of staff of the Second Marine Division the position he was serving in when the United States entered World War II.

== World War II ==
Rockey was assigned duties as director, Division of Plans and Policies at Headquarters Marine Corps, in August 1942, and one year later assumed duties as Assistant Commandant of the Marine Corps. In February 1944, he went to the Pacific where he was successively commanding general of the Fifth Marine Division and the Third Amphibious Corps.

Following deactivation of the Third Amphibious Corps, he assumed command of the First Marine Division (Reinforced), with headquarters at Tientsin, China. He returned to the United States and became commanding general of the Department of the Pacific, San Francisco, California, in September 1946.

== Post-war years ==
On January 1, 1947, he was advanced to lieutenant general (temporary), and the following day assumed command of the Fleet Marine Force, Atlantic with headquarters in Norfolk, Virginia. On July 1, 1949, when he was detached to again become commanding general, Department of the Pacific, San Francisco, California, he returned to his permanent rank of major general. He retired as a lieutenant general on September 1, 1950.

General Rockey died of a heart attack, aged 81, June 6, 1970, in Harwich Port, Massachusetts.

Funeral services with full military honors were held June 11, 1970 at Arlington National Cemetery, Arlington, Virginia.

== Decorations and medals ==

1st Row	Navy Cross with Gold award star		Distinguished Service Cross	
2nd Row	Navy Distinguished Service Medal	Army Distinguished Service Medal	Navy Presidential Unit Citation	Marine Corps Expeditionary Medal
3rd Row	Mexican Service Medal	World War I Victory Medal with Aisne & Defensive Sector clasps	Haitian Campaign Medal (1921)	Nicaraguan Campaign Medal (1933)
4th Row	American Defense Service Medal	American Campaign Medal	Asiatic-Pacific Campaign Medal with two service stars	World War II Victory Medal
5th Row	National Defense Service Medal	Nicaraguan Medal of Merit	Order of the Cloud and Banner, Second Class	Legion of Honor, Officer

=== First Navy Cross citation ===
Citation:

The President of the United States of America takes pleasure in presenting the Navy Cross to Captain Keller Emrick Rockey (MCSN: 0-838), United States Marine Corps, for extraordinary heroism while serving with the First Battalion, 6th Regiment (Marines), 2d Division, A.E.F. in action at Chateau-Thierry, France, on 6 June 1918. Captain Rockey performed distinguished service by bringing up supports and placing them in the front lines at great personal exposure, showing exceptional ability and extraordinary heroism. He was indefatigable and invaluable in carrying forward the attack and organizing and holding the position.

=== Second Navy Cross citation ===
Citation:

The President of the United States of America takes pleasure in presenting a Gold Star in lieu of a Second Award of the Navy Cross to Major Keller Emrick Rockey (MCSN: 0-838), United States Marine Corps, for distinguished service in the line of his profession as Commanding Officer, First Battalion, Eleventh Regiment, Second Brigade, U.S. Marine Corps, operating in the Northern Area of Nicaragua from 19 January 1928 to 11 November 1928. Major Rockey displayed great zeal, initiative and sound judgment in planning and leading many combat patrols against the numerous and active bandit groups infesting the practically unexplored area. His courage, ability and good judgment contributed largely to the successful suppression of banditry in the province of Nuevo Segovia and in the northern area.

=== Distinguished Service Cross citation ===
Citation:

The President of the United States of America, authorized by Act of Congress, July 9, 1918, takes pleasure in presenting the Distinguished Service Cross to Captain Keller Emrick Rockey (MCSN: 0-838), United States Marine Corps, for extraordinary heroism while serving with the First Battalion, Sixth Regiment (Marines), 2d Division, A.E.F., in action at Chateau-Thierry, France, on 6 June 1918. Captain Rockey performed distinguished service by bringing up supports and placing them in the front lines at great personal exposure, showing exceptional ability and extraordinary heroism. He was indefatigable and invaluable in carrying forward the attack and organizing and holding the position.

Military offices
Preceded by Thomas E. Watson; Acting	Commanding General of Fleet Marine Force, Atlantic; 1 January 1947 – 1 July 1949	Succeeded by LeRoy P. Hunt
Preceded by Harry Schmidt	Assistant Commandant of the Marine Corps; 2 August 1943 – 17 January 1944	Succeeded by DeWitt Peck
Preceded by DeWitt Peck	Commanding General of the 1st Marine Division; 10 June 1946 – 17 September 1946	Succeeded by Samuel L. Howard
