= Battle of Corregidor =

1942 battle of World War II, during the Japanese invasion of the Philippines

Coordinates: 14.6667°N 120.4170°E

- Part of the Philippines campaign of World War II
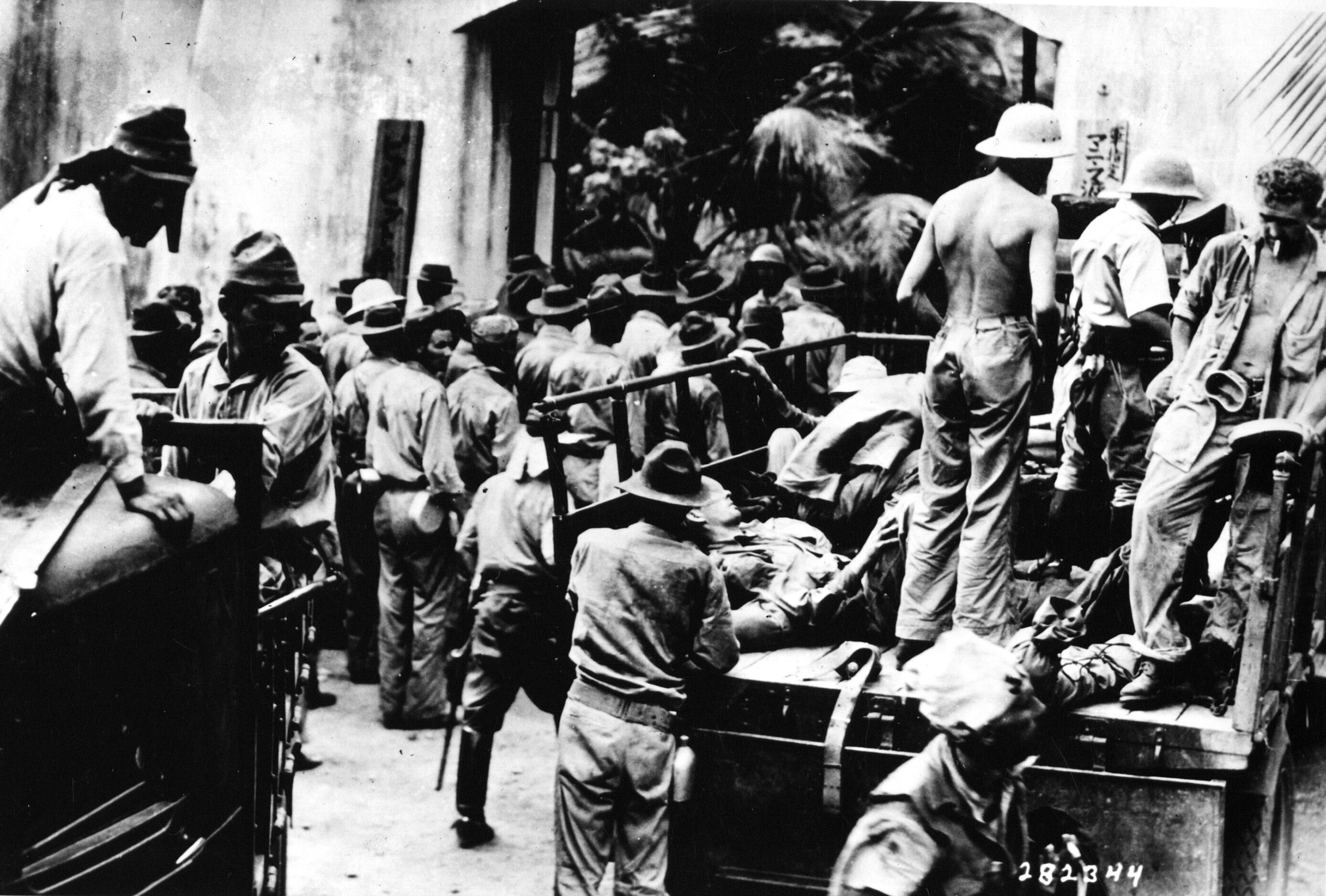
- American and Filipino prisoners of war after the battle
Date	5–6 May 1942
Location	Corregidor island in Manila Bay, Luzon, Philippines
Result	Japanese victory

Belligerents
United States: Philippines	Japan

Commanders and leaders
(United States) Jonathan M. Wainwright (POW) (United States) George F. Moore (POW) (United States) Samuel L. Howard (POW)	(Empire of Japan) Masaharu Homma (Empire of Japan) Kureo Taniguchi (Empire of Japan) Gempachi Sato (Empire of Japan) Kizon Mikami (Empire of Japan) Haruji Morita (Empire of Japan) Col. Koike (Empire of Japan) Col. Inoue

Units involved
Ground units: 4th Marine Regiment Philippine Department: 59th Coast Artillery Regiment; 60th Coast Artillery Regiment; 91st Coast Artillery Regiment; 92nd Coast Artillery Regiment; 200th Coast Artillery Regiment; 515th Coast Artillery Regiment; 803rd Engineer Aviation Battalion; Company A; Philippine Commonwealth Army: 1st Coast Artillery Regiment; 2nd Coast Artillery Regiment; Battery D; Battery F; Naval Units: 16th Naval District: U.S. Navy Inshore Patrol; Oahu (PR-6); Luzon (PR-7); Quail (AM-15); Pigeon (ASR-6); (abandoned ship) crew	Ground units: Japanese Fourteenth Army: 4th Infantry Division; 7th Tank Regiment; Aerial units: 22nd Air Brigade

Strength
13,000 U.S. and Filipino troops, 2 gunboats, and 1 minesweeper	75,000 Japanese troops

Casualties and losses
800 killed 1,000 wounded 11,000 POWs; 1 gunboat sunk 1 gunboat scuttled 1 minesweeper scuttled Japanese claim : 640 killed 12,495 POWs	900 killed 1,200 wounded Japanese claim : zero casualties

The Battle of Corregidor (Filipino: Labanan sa Corregidor; Japanese: コレヒドールの戦い), fought on 5–6 May 1942, was the culmination of the Japanese campaign for the conquest of the Commonwealth of the Philippines during World War II.

The fall of Bataan on 9 April 1942 ended all organized opposition by the United States Army Forces in the Far East to the invading Japanese forces on Luzon, in the northern Philippines. The island bastion of Corregidor, with its network of tunnels and formidable array of defensive armaments, along with the fortifications across the entrance to Manila Bay, was the remaining obstacle to the Japanese Fourteenth Area Army of Lieutenant General Masaharu Homma. Homma had to take Corregidor because as long as the island remained in American hands, the Japanese would be denied the use of Manila Bay and its harbor. The U.S. Army eventually recaptured the island in 1945.

== Background ==
=== Gibraltar of the East ===
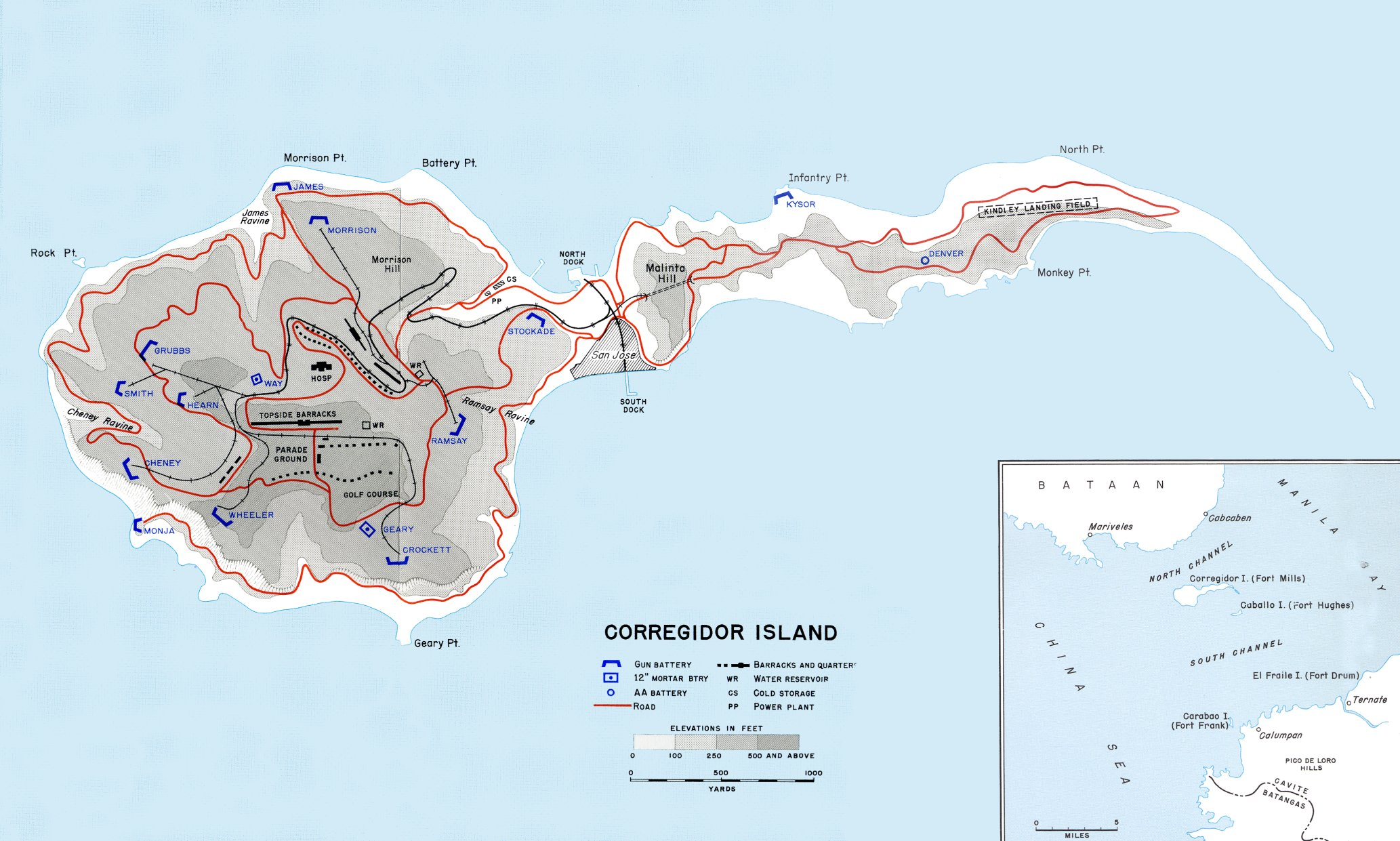
Map of Corregidor Island in 1941

Corregidor, named Fort Mills, was the largest of four fortified islands protecting the mouth of Manila Bay and had been fortified prior to World War I with powerful coastal artillery. Some 4 mi (6.4 km) long and 1.5 mi (2.4 km) across at its head, the tadpole-shaped island was 3.5 mi (3.0 nmi; 5.6 km) from Bataan. Its widest and elevated area, known as Topside, held most of the fort's fifty-six coastal defense guns and mortars, and twenty-eight 3-inch antiaircraft guns, besides the three-story "Mile-Long Barracks." Middleside was a small plateau containing battery positions as well as barracks. Bottomside was the lower area, where a dock area and the civilian town of San Jose were located, besides the controlled-mine complex. Americans called it "The Rock", "Fortress Corregidor" or even the "Gibraltar of the East", comparing it to the fortress that guards the entrance to the Mediterranean Sea between Europe and Africa.

The tunnel system under Malinta Hill was the most extensive construction on Corregidor. It contained a main east–west passage 1,400 ft (430 m) long and 30 ft (9.1 m) wide, with 25 lateral passages, each about 400 ft (120 m) long, which branched out at regular intervals from each side of the main passage. A separate system of tunnels north of this housed the underground hospital with 12 laterals of its own. The facility could be reached either through the main tunnel or by a separate outside entrance on the north side of Malinta Hill. The Navy tunnel system was located south of the quartermaster area that extended south of Lateral 8. Petrol was stored near the west entrance, while General MacArthur's headquarters was located in Lateral 3, next to General George Moore's headquarters in Lateral 2, and President Quezon's quarters next to the east entrance. Reinforced with concrete walls, floors, and overhead arches, it also had blowers to furnish fresh air and an electric trolley along the east–west passage.

=== Defenses ===
Mortars at Corregidor's Battery Way could be rotated to fire in any direction

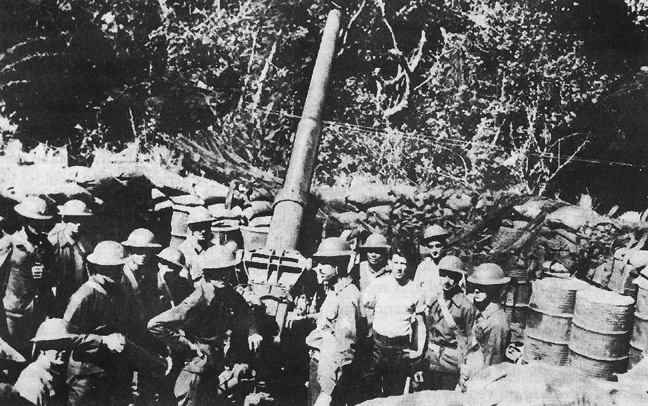
3-inch antiaircraft gun M3 on Corregidor

The defensive arsenal on Corregidor was formidable with 45 coastal guns and mortars organized into 23 batteries, some 72 anti-aircraft weapons assigned to 13 batteries and a minefield of approximately 35 groups of controlled mines. Batteries Wheeler and Crockett each had two12-inch Gun M1895s, while Batteries Smith and Hearn had a single gun each. Battery Way had four 12-inch coast defense mortars while Battery Geary had eight. Battery Grubbs had two 10-inch gun M1895s, while Batteries Morrison, Ramsay and James had 6-inch gun M1905s, two, three and four respectively. Batteries Maxwell Keyes, Alonso Cushing and Guy B. Hanna had two 3-inch gun M1903.

Caballo Island, with Fort Hughes, 2.5 miles (4.0 km) south of Corregidor's lighthouse, with an area of 75 acres (30 ha), rises to a height of 381 ft (116 m). Battery Woodruff had a single 14-inch gun M1910, Battery Craighill had four 12-inch M1912 mortars, Battery Leach had two 6-inch gun M1908s, while Battery Fuger had two 3-inch gun M1903s.

Fort Drum (El Fraile Island) is 6.3 mi (10.1 km) southeast of Corregidor's lighthouse. Batteries Marshall and Wilson had two 14-inch gun M1909s each, while Batteries Roberts and McCrea had two 6-inch gun M1908s each.

Fort Frank on Carabao Island is 8.1 mi (13.0 km) south of Corregidor's lighthouse, near the Cavite shoreline, and rises 180 ft (55 m) above the sea. Batteries Greer and Crofton have single 14-inch gun M1907s, while Battery Koehler has eight 12-inch gun M1908s, and Battery Hoyle has two 3-inch guns.

All four forts in Manila Bay—as well as Fort Wint in Subic Bay—had been formed before the war into an organization called the Harbor Defenses of Manila and Subic Bays, which by August 1941 became a part of the Philippine Coast Artillery Command. Both were under Major General George F. Moore. The 5,700 men of the Harbor Defense Force were assigned to four coast artillery (CA) regiments: the 59th, 60th, 91st, and 92nd CA (the 60th CA being an antiaircraft artillery unit and the 91st and 92d CA Philippine Scouts units). About 600 Philippine Army soldiers in training were organized into the 1st and 2nd Coast Artillery Regiments (PA) but operated under the control of the two PS regiments. Moore organized the force into four commands to exercise tactical control: (1) seaward defense, and (2) North and South Channels defense, under Colonel Paul D. Bunker; (3) anti-aircraft and air warning defenses under Colonel Theodore M. Chase, and (4) inshore patrol under Captain Kenneth M. Hoeffel of the US Navy. Fort Frank had a garrison of 200 men, Fort Hughes 800 men, and Fort Drum 200.

On 24 December, Subic Bay was abandoned along with Fort Wint. On 29 December, after evacuating Olongapo, Subic Naval Base, Samuel L. Howard's 4th Marine Regiment became the primary fighting unit on Corregidor. Curtis T. Beecher's The 1st Battalion held the tail of Corregidor, the 3rd Battalion the middle of the island, and the 2nd Battalion defended the western end, while Schaeffer's 4th Battalion was held in reserve. Of Howard's 3900 men, only 1500 were marines, the remainder was composed of various Army, Navy, Philippine Army and Philippine Scouts.

== Siege ==
From 29 December 1941 until 6 January 1942, the Japanese airplanes bombed the island, destroying half of the wooden structures on the island, the electric train system, and the water distribution system. Everyone was put on half rations. With 15,000 people on the island, there was food for only six to eight weeks. On 8 April, the 60th Coast Artillery, commanded by Theodore M. Chase, withdrew from Bataan to Corregidor.

On 3 February USS Trout (SS-202) arrived at Corregidor with 3,500 rounds of 3-inch anti-aircraft ammunition. Along with mail and important documents, Trout was loaded with 20 tons of gold and silver previously removed from banks in the Philippines before departing.

On 5 February, the Japanese started firing on Forts Frank and Drum using 105mm and 155mm guns on Cavite. Then on 15 March, the Japanese started firing with their 240mm howitzers.

On 12 March under the cover of darkness, MacArthur was evacuated from Corregidor, using four PT boats bound for Mindanao, from where he was eventually flown to Australia. He left Wainwright in command in the Philippines. The defenders were living on about 30 ounces of food per day. Drinking water was distributed only twice a day, but the constant bombing and shelling often interrupted the distribution of rations. When the bombardment killed horses of the cavalry, the men would drag the carcasses down to the mess hall for consumption. The continued lack of proper diet created problems for the Corregidor garrison, as men weakened and lacked reliable night vision. From Cebu, seven private ships under orders from the army, loaded with a supply of food, sailed towards Corregidor. Only one reached the island, the MV Princessa commanded by 3rd Lieutenant Zosimo Cruz (USAFFE). As of about 15 April, the combined strength of the four fortified islands—including US Army, Philippine Scouts, Philippine Army, US Marine Corps, US Navy, Philippine Navy, and civilians—totaled about 14,728.

Japanese artillery bombardment of Corregidor began after the fall of Bataan on 9 April. It became intense over the next few weeks as more guns were brought up, and one day's shelling was said to equal all the bombing raids combined in damage inflicted. However, after an initial response from a 155 mm GPF battery, Wainwright prohibited counterbattery fire for three days, fearing there were wounded POWs on Bataan who might be killed.

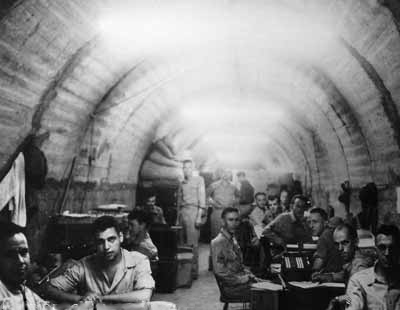
Malinta Tunnel's Lateral 12

Japanese bombing and shelling continued with unrelenting ferocity. Japanese aircraft flew 614 missions, dropping 1,701 bombs totaling some 365 tons of explosives. Joining the aerial bombardment were nine 240 mm (9.45 in) howitzers, thirty-four 149 mm (5.9 in) howitzers, and 32 other artillery pieces, which pounded Corregidor day and night.

By 14 April, all of Corregidor's north shore batteries were out of action. On 29 April, two Navy PBYs flew out 50 nurses and headquarters staff.

Moore, a 1908 graduate of the Agricultural and Mechanical College of Texas (now Texas A&M University), then gathered the names of 25 other Aggies – as the school's students, alumni and athletic teams are known – under his command with the help of Major Tom Dooley of A&M's class of 1935. On 21 April, Moore held a muster, or military roll call, calling the names of each of the Aggies under his command. In 1889, Texas A&M administrators had declared that that date – San Jacinto Day in Texas, the anniversary of the Battle of San Jacinto whereby Texas gained its independence from Mexico – would be a school holiday, and it had evolved into a day for current students and alumni to gather wherever they were. Dooley told a United Press correspondent about the gathering, and the reporter sent an article back to the United States about the 25 Aggies who had "Mustered". Although the Aggies on Corregidor did not physically gather for Muster, stories were widely published celebrating their heroic assembly in an island tunnel including yelling and singing of songs about Texan independence. Only 12 of the 25 would survive the battle and the subsequent POW camps.

On 24 April, Battery Crockett's guns were hit and put out of action. On 1 May, the Japanese bombardment increased, concentrating on landing sites. On 2 May, 3600 240mm shells fell on Batteries Cheney and Geary, and Battery Geary's magazine detonated, putting all eight guns out of action. The bombardment continued over the next three days.

On the night of 4 May, the submarine USS Spearfish, returning to Australia from patrol evacuated 25 persons. Among the passengers were Colonel Constant Irwin, who carried a complete roster of all Army, Navy, and Marine personnel still alive; Col. Royal G. Jenks, a finance officer, with financial accounts; Col. Milton A. Hill, the inspector general, 3 other Army and 6 Navy officers, and about 13 nurses. Included in the cargo sent from Corregidor were several bags of mail, the last to go out of the Philippines, and "many USAFFE and USFIP records and orders."

By 5 May, only three 155mm guns on Corregidor were operational.

Japanese propaganda to its home population repeatedly declared in this period that Corregidor was about to fall, followed by weeks of silence when it did not happen. Imperial General Headquarters finally declared that the resistance was becoming a serious embarrassment.

Homma's invasion plan relied on Kenzo Kitano's 4th Division. The 1st and 2nd Battalions of Gempachi Sato's 61st Infantry, under Infantry Group Commander Kureo Taniguchi, would land first on Corregidor's tail with 2000 men, supported with tanks from the 7th Tank Regiment. A second wave would land below Topside the following night with 4000 men led by Taniguchi, composed of the 37th Infantry and a battalion of 8th Infantry, plus tanks from the 7th Tank Regiment.

== Fall ==
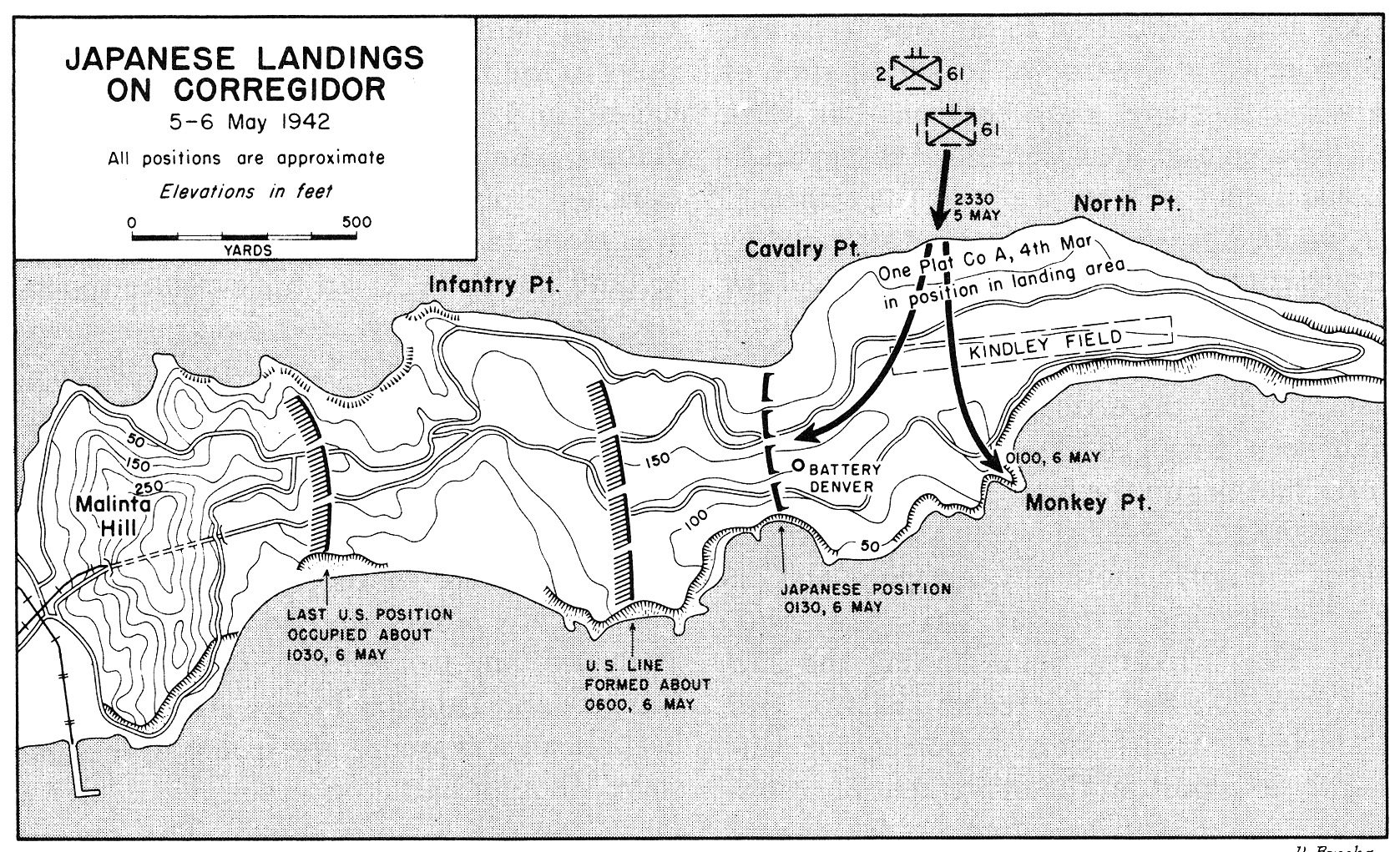
Japanese landings on Corregidor, 5–6 May 1942

On 5 May Japanese forces led by Maj. Gen. Kureo Taniguchi boarded landing craft and barges and headed for the final assault on Corregidor. Shortly before midnight, intense shelling struck the beaches between North Point and Cavalry Point. The initial landing of 790 Japanese soldiers was quickly bogged down by fierce resistance from the American and Filipino defenders, whose 37 mm artillery exacted a heavy toll on the invasion fleet. It was a bloodbath. Observers at Cabcaben described the scene as "a spectacle that confounded the imagination, surpassing in grim horror anything we had ever seen before."

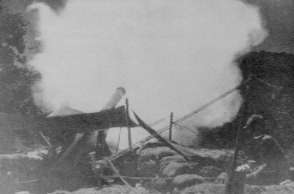
Japanese artillery in action against Corregidor

The 1st Battalion landed on Corregidor at 11 p.m., while the 2nd Battalion landed almost an hour later. Difficulty in identifying the intended landing points, plus the current, meant the 21st Engineer Regiments barges landed the Japanese men on North Point eastward, further from their intended objective of Malinta Hill. The Japanese suffered high losses—one Japanese officer calling it a "dreadful massacre"—with at least 22 half-sunk landing craft full of Japanese dead; however, enough made it ashore to consolidate a beachhead. By 1:30 a.m. the Denver battery and the forward slope of Water Tank Hill had been captured by Sato's men.

By 2 a.m., Howard committed Schaeffer's Regimental Reserve in support of Beecher. Robert Chambers' O Company and William F. Hogaboom's P Company led the effort. However, on their way to Water Tank Hill, O Company was decimated by Japanese artillery. The remaining men could not put up a coordinated effort without support weapons. Sato bided his time, strengthening his line, while waiting for the reinforcements expected at dawn. At 4:30 a.m. Paul C. Moore's Q Company, followed by R, S, and T joined the battle, but at 4:40 a.m., an additional 21 Japanese landing craft were spotted headed for the Corregidor shore. The American counterattack started at 6:15 a.m., but supported with only grenades, it faltered by 9 a.m. However, some officers bypassed on the tail of the island were able to form a defensive perimeter at Monkey Point, causing trouble for the Japanese on the other side of Kindley Field.

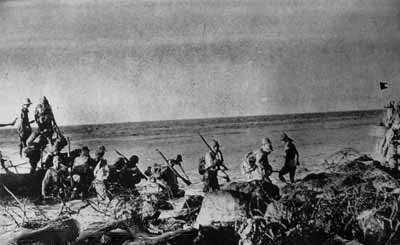
Japanese troops landing on Corregidor

At 10 a.m., Japanese tanks landed on Corregidor, and according to Wainwright, "...it was the terror that is vested in a tank that was the deciding factor." At 10:30 a.m., Wainwright ordered Beebee to broadcast a surrender message to Homma.

== Aftermath ==
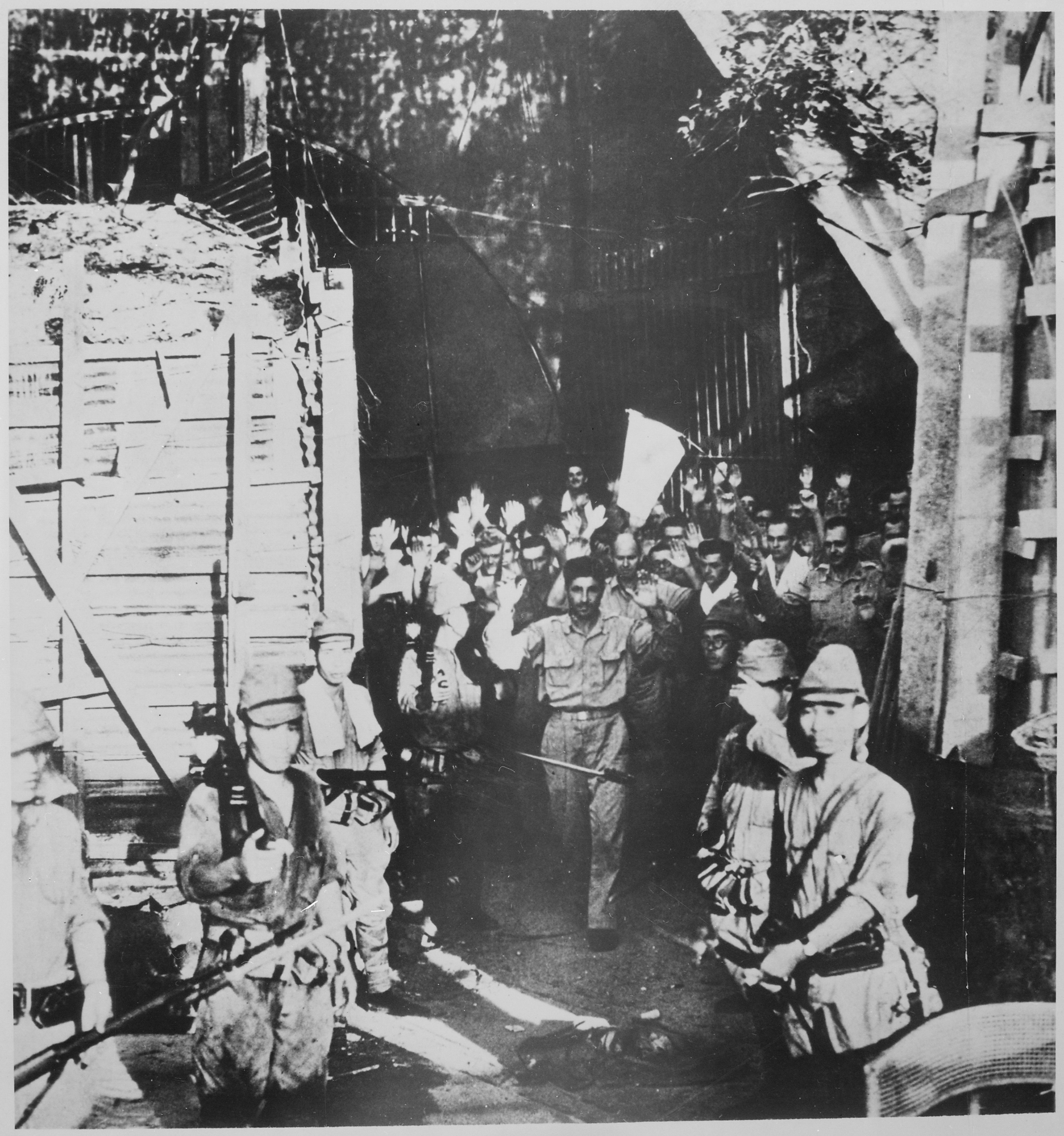
Surrender of American troops at Corregidor

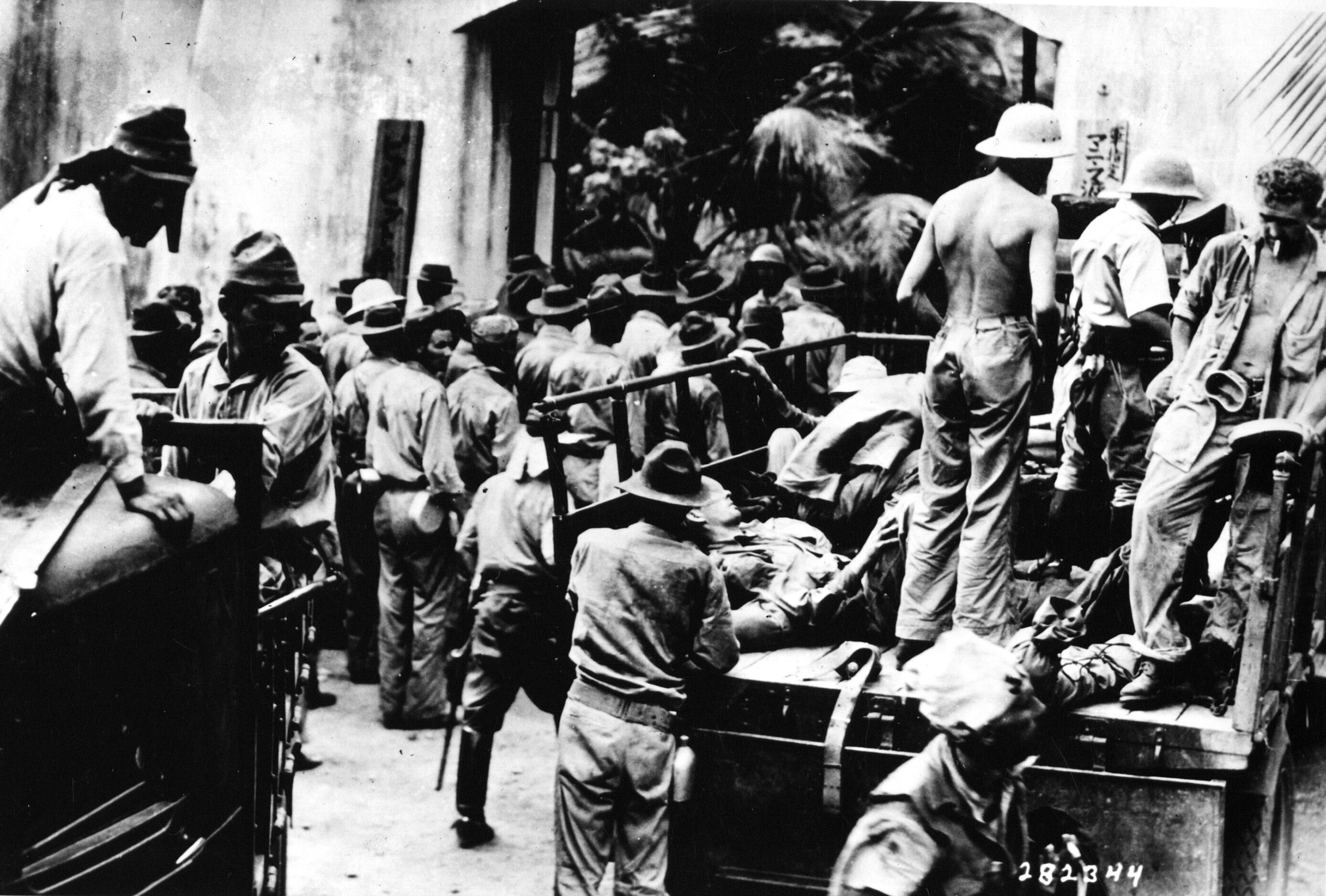
American and Filipino prisoners, captured at Corregidor, arrive at Bilibid prison by foot and truck as Japanese look on, 25 May 1942.

Unlike the Filipinos and Americans on Bataan who surrendered to the Japanese forces, the Prisoners of War (POWs) in Corregidor were not subjected to the death march. They were sent to Bataan only to collect the dead Japanese for cremation and bury the dead Americans and Filipinos.

On 23 May, the Japanese prisoners on Corregidor were marched to the South Mine Wharf and boarded onto three ships anchored in San Jose Bay. After landing in Manila, the Filipinos were offloaded onto a dock, while the Americans were paraded down Dewey Boulevard to Old Bilibid Prison, then onward to Cabanatuan Camp No. 3. At the end of July, the Angels of Bataan nurses were sent to the Santo Tomas Internment Camp.

== Commemoration ==
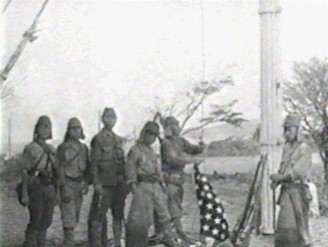
Japanese soldiers take down the American Flag at the Old Spanish Flagpole in Corregidor Island

An unnamed Marine from the 4th Marine Regiment wrote the following lyrics to the tune of the "Marines' Hymn," just before going into battle in Corregidor.

First to jump for holes and tunnels
And to keep our skivvies clean,
We are proud to claim the title
of Corregidor's Marines.

Our drawers unfurled to every breeze
From dawn to setting sun.
We have jumped into every hole and ditch
And for us the fightin' was fun.

We have plenty of guns and ammunition
But not cigars and cigarettes,
At the last we may be smoking leaves
Wrapped in Nipponese propaganda leaflets.

When the Army and the Navy
Looked out Corregidor's Tunnel Queen,
They saw the beaches guarded
by more than one Marine!

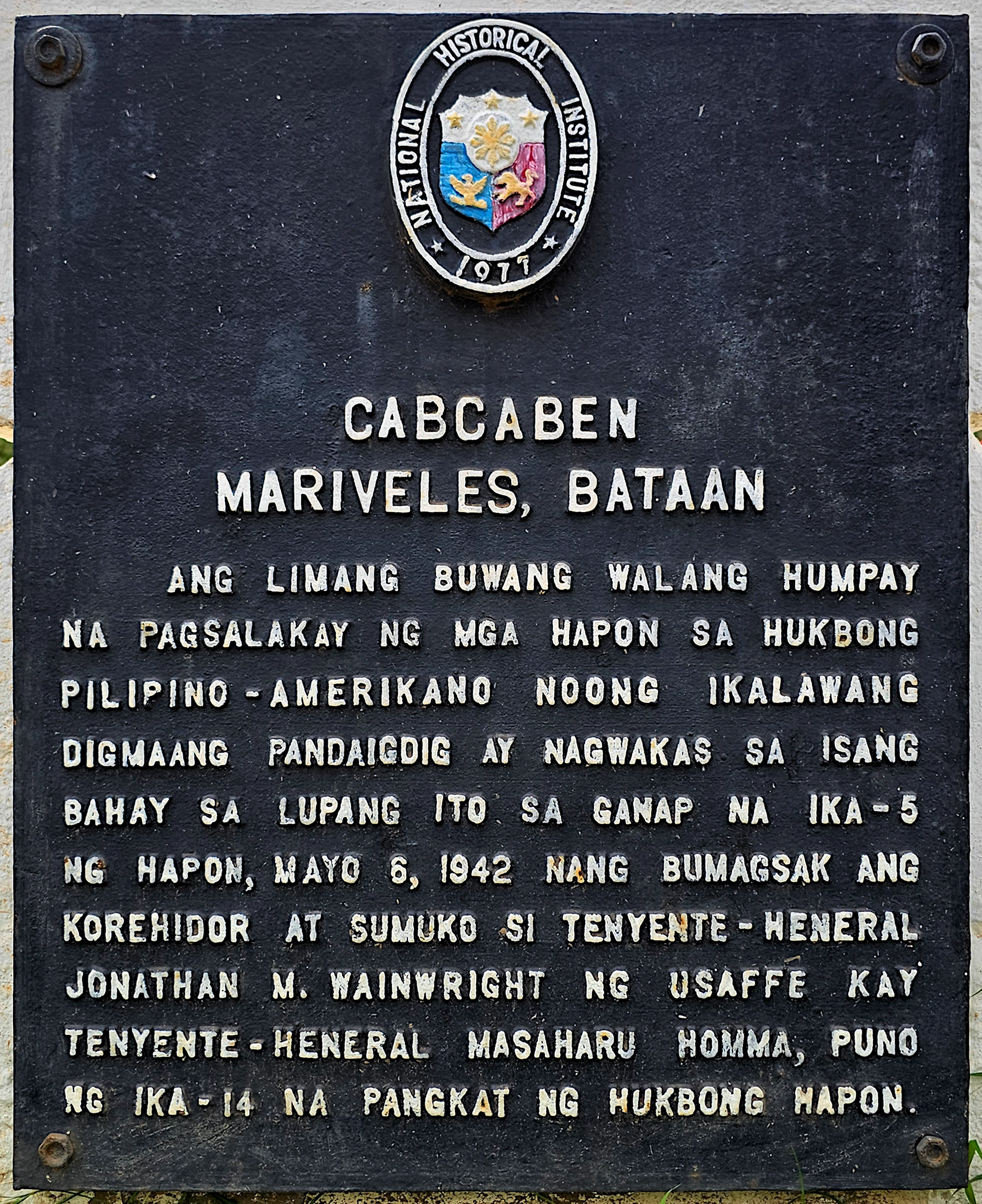
Philippine historical marker installed in 1977 in Mariveles, Bataan, commemorating the site where Gen. Wainwright surrendered to Gen. Homma

The Pacific War Memorial was built on Corregidor in memory of the American and Filipino soldiers who died. The bridge in Chicago where State Street crosses the Chicago River is named the 'Bataan–Corregidor Memorial Bridge'. The bridge over the Farmington River on Connecticut Route 185 in Simsbury, Connecticut was renamed the "Bataan Corregidor Memorial Bridge." Connecticut State Senator Kevin Witkos hosted the dedication ceremony on Saturday, December 7, 2013.

The following year, E. E. McQuillen, Executive Secretary of Texas A&M's alumni association, The Association of Former Students, renamed the school's 21 April event Aggie Muster in response to the Corregidor Muster. It was then that began to evolve into how it is known today, when students and alumni also honor fellow Aggies who have died. Dr. John Ashton of A&M's class of 1906 also wrote a poem in 1943 at McQuillen's request. Entitled "The Heroes' Roll Call", also known as the "Roll Call for the Absent", it also commemorates the 1942 Muster and is designed so that the number of years since 1942 can be inserted.

== See also ==
- Naval Base Manila
- Philippines campaign (1941–1942)
