= Louis R. Jones =

U.S. Marine Corps Major General

Louis Reeder Jones
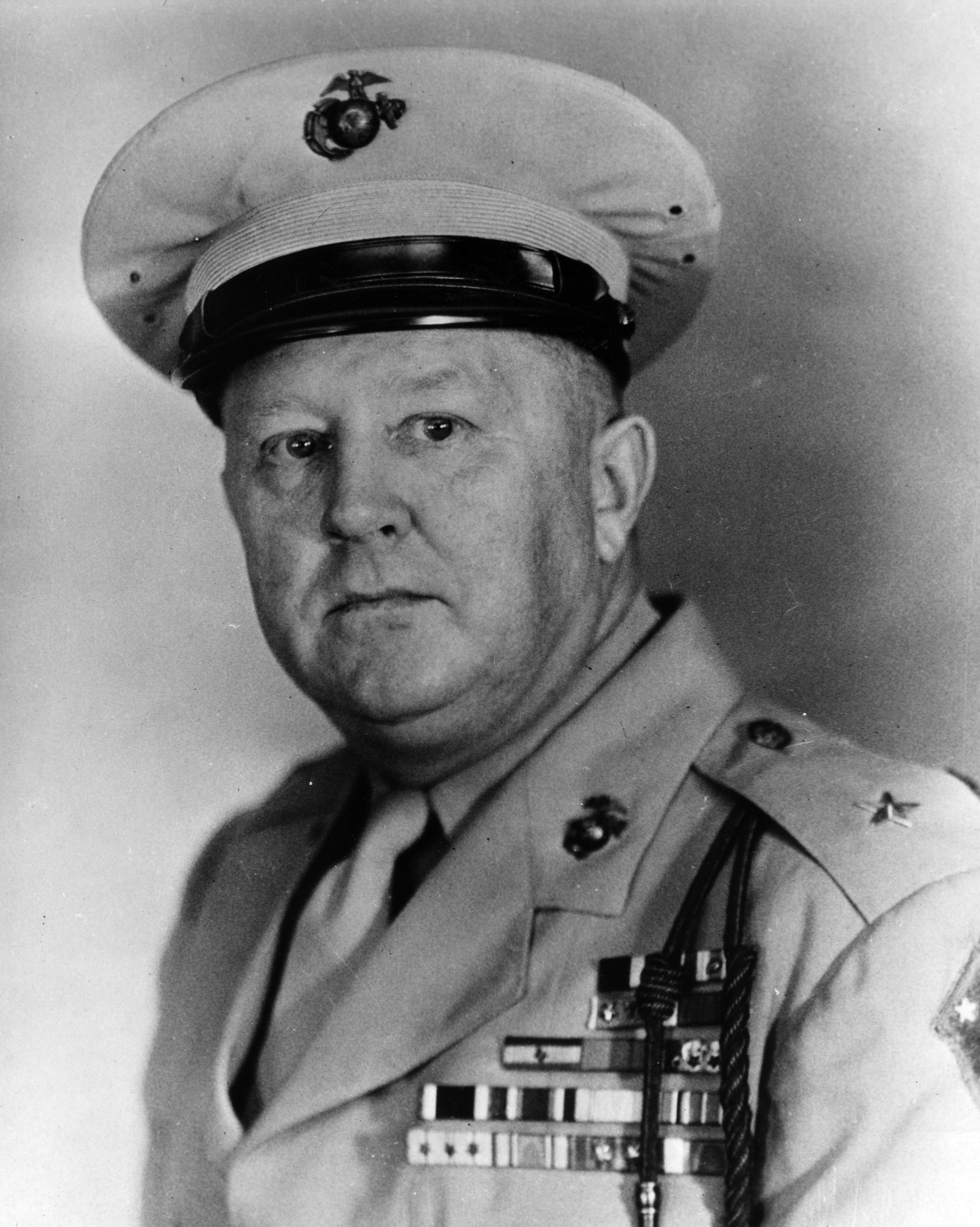
- Louis R. Jones as brigadier general, USMC
- Born: June 29, 1895; Philadelphia, Pennsylvania
- Died: February 2, 1973 (aged 77)
- Burial place: Arlington National Cemetery
- Military career
- Allegiance: United States of America
- Branch: United States Marine Corps
- Service years: 1914–1949
- Rank: Major general
- Service number: 0-486
- Commands: 23rd Marine Regiment
- Conflicts: World War I: Battle of Soissons; Battle of Saint-Mihiel; Battle of Blanc Mont Ridge; Meuse-Argonne Offensive; World War II: Battle of Kwajalein; Battle of Saipan; Battle of Tinian; Battle of Peleliu; Battle of Okinawa; Chinese Civil War
- Awards: Navy Cross; Silver Star (2); Legion of Merit (3); Purple Heart

Louis Reeder Jones (June 29, 1895 – February 2, 1973) was a highly decorated major general in the United States Marine Corps during World War II. He was a recipient of Navy Cross for his service with 23rd Marine Regiment during Saipan and Tinian Campaigns.

== Early military career ==
Louis R. Jones was born on June 29, 1895, in Philadelphia, Pennsylvania. He enlisted in the United States Marine Corps in 1914 and served as enlisted man until he accepted commission as second lieutenant on July 10, 1917. He was first assigned to the Marine Corps Rifle Range in Winthrop, Maryland and subsequently assigned to the instruction course at the Marine Officers' School at Port Royal, South Carolina.

After graduation from the course, Jones was assigned to the 75th Company, 1st Battalion, 6th Marine Regiment. He sailed to France in October 1917 and served in Verdun Sector, where he was wounded by the effects of combat gas in March 1918. After his recovery, Jones was assigned as first lieutenant and platoon leader to the 83rd Company, 1st Battalion, and participated in Battle of Soissons during July 1918. He was decorated with the Silver Star for gallantry in action during this battle.

During the following Battle of Saint-Mihiel in September 1918, Jones was ordered to take over an advanced line near Thiaucourt. He accomplished his mission under constant shell fire and was decorated with his second Silver Star. He was also decorated with French Croix de guerre 1914-1918 by the Government of France.

Jones was later appointed commander of 83rd Company and participated in the Battle of Blanc Mont Ridge. He remained in command of the company after the Armistice of 11 November 1918 and served during the Allied occupation of the Rhineland. Jones stayed in Germany until April 1919, when he was ordered back to the United States.

== World War II ==
In September 1941, Jones was appointed chief of staff of the Marine Corps Recruit Depot Parris Island, South Carolina. He was appointed commanding officer of the newly activated 23rd Marine Regiment in September 1942. The 23rd Marines were stationed at Camp Pendleton, California, before sailed as part of 4th Marine Division for Central Pacific in January 1944.

Jones commanded 23rd Marines during Battle of Kwajalein in February 1944 and was decorated for his leadership with the Legion of Merit with Combat "V". He continued in command of the regiment during the following Battle of Saipan and Battle of Tinian. Jones distinguished himself again during these battles and was decorated with the Navy Cross in August 1944. He also received the Navy Presidential Unit Citation.

His Navy Cross Citation reads:

The President of the United States of America takes pleasure in presenting the Navy Cross to Colonel Louis R. Jones (MCSN: 0-486), United States Marine Corps, for extraordinary heroism as Commanding Officer of the Twenty-Third Marines, FOURTH Marine Division, during action against enemy Japanese forces on Saipan and Tinian, Marianas Islands from 15 June to 2 August 1944. Landing on both islands in the initial assaults on vital sectors, Colonel Jones capably led his Regiment and, defying heavy artillery, machine-gun and mortar fire, seized beachheads and held them tenaciously against repeated counterattacks until the full force of the supporting elements could be landed. Resourceful in battle exigencies and analyzing enemy tactics, he coordinated the efforts of the units under his command and led his Regiment in unrelenting attacks against the Japanese. Seizing assigned objectives despite fanatic resistance and annihilating thousands of the enemy, he was continually in the field throughout the operation, visiting his front line units and coordinating their efforts. His inspiring leadership, professional ability and devotion to duty reflect the highest credit upon Colonel Jones and the United States Naval Service.

In September 1944, Jones was succeeded by Colonel Walter W. Wensinger and promoted to the rank of brigadier general. He was subsequently transferred to the staff of 1st Marine Division under the command of Major General Pedro del Valle and appointed assistant division commander.

He was assigned to the 1st Marine Division during the Battle of Peleliu. He subsequently participated in the task of rebuilding the 1st Marine Division to an effective combat unit. At the end of March 1945, the 1st Marine Division was ready to fight again. Jones participated in the following Battle of Okinawa and was decorated with the Legion of Merit and the division was awarded a Navy Presidential Unit Citation.

== Postwar duties ==
Jones remained with 1st Marine Division after the War and was sent to North China in September 1945. His 1st Division, with Major General Dewitt Peck in command, was tasked with repatriating more than 650,000 Japanese soldiers and civilians still resident in that part of China. They were also tasked with guarding of supply trains, bridges and depots to keep food and coal moving into the cities. Jones also participated in the skirmishes with People's Liberation Army soldiers attacking supply depots.

For his service in North China, Jones was decorated with his third Legion of Merit by the army and also received Order of the Cloud and Banner, 4th Class personally from Chiang Kai-shek. Jones subsequently returned to the United States in June 1946 and was appointed president of Marine Corps Equipment Board at Marine Corps Schools at Quantico, Virginia.

He retired from this capacity on June 30, 1949. Following his retirement from the Marine Corps, Jones was advanced to the rank of major general on the retired list for having been specially commended in combat. Jones died on February 2, 1973, and is buried together with his wife Rhita Wilmer Jones (1893–1984), three sons, and a daughter at Arlington National Cemetery, Virginia.

== Decorations ==

1st Row	Navy Cross		Silver Star	Legion of Merit with two Gold Stars and Combat "V"	French Fourragère
2nd Row	Purple Heart	Navy Presidential Unit Citation with one service star	Marine Corps Expeditionary Medal	World War I Victory Medal with four battle clasps	French Fourragère
3rd Row	Army of Occupation of Germany Medal	Yangtze Service Medal	American Defense Service Medal	American Campaign Medal	French Fourragère
4th Row	Asiatic-Pacific Campaign Medal with four service stars	World War II Victory Medal	French Croix de guerre 1914-1918 with two gilt stars	Order of the Cloud and Banner, 4th Class (Republic of China)	French Fourragère

Military offices
Preceded by Lieutenant Colonel William B. Onley	Commanding Officer of the 23rd Marine Regiment; September 3, 1942 - October 15, 1944	Succeeded by Colonel Walter W. Wensinger
