= Neil D. Van Sickle =

United States Air Force general (1915–2019)

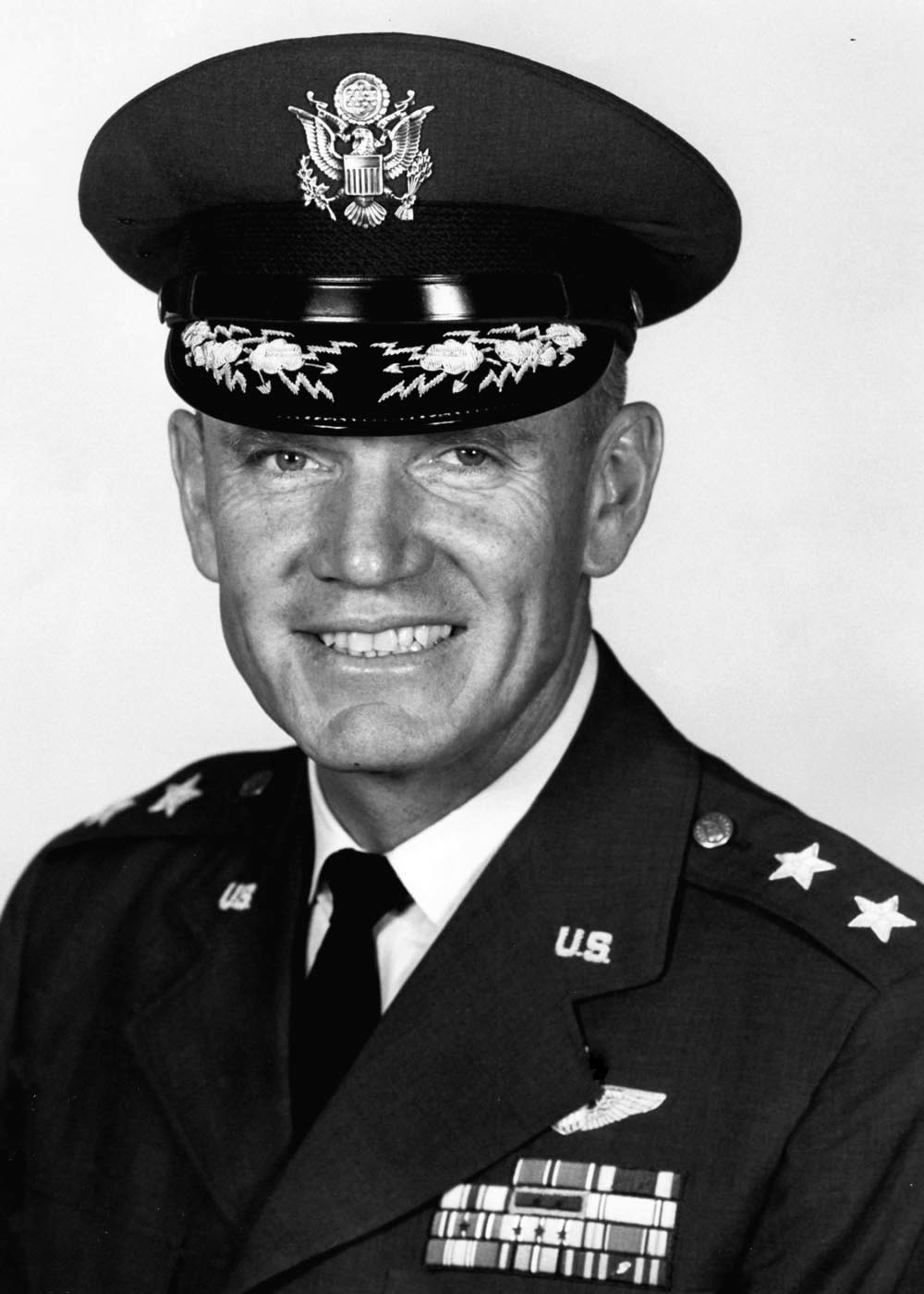
- Born: Neil David Van Sickle; July 8, 1915; Minot, North Dakota, U.S.
- Died: September 29, 2019 (aged 104); Kalispell, Montana, U.S.
- Relatives: Major General (retired) Paul M. Van Sickle, USAF, nephew; Colonel (retired) Earl Rosenquist Van Sickle, USAF, brother
- Military career
- Allegiance: United States of America
- Branch: United States Air Force
- Service years: 1938–1968
- Rank: Major General
- Commands: Deputy Inspector General of the U.S. Air Force
- Awards: Legion of Merit; Bronze Star Medal; Air Medal with two oak leaf clusters; Air Force Commendation Medal

Neil David Van Sickle (July 8, 1915 – September 29, 2019) was an American Air Force major general who was the deputy inspector general at Headquarters, United States Air Force, Washington, D.C.

== Biography ==
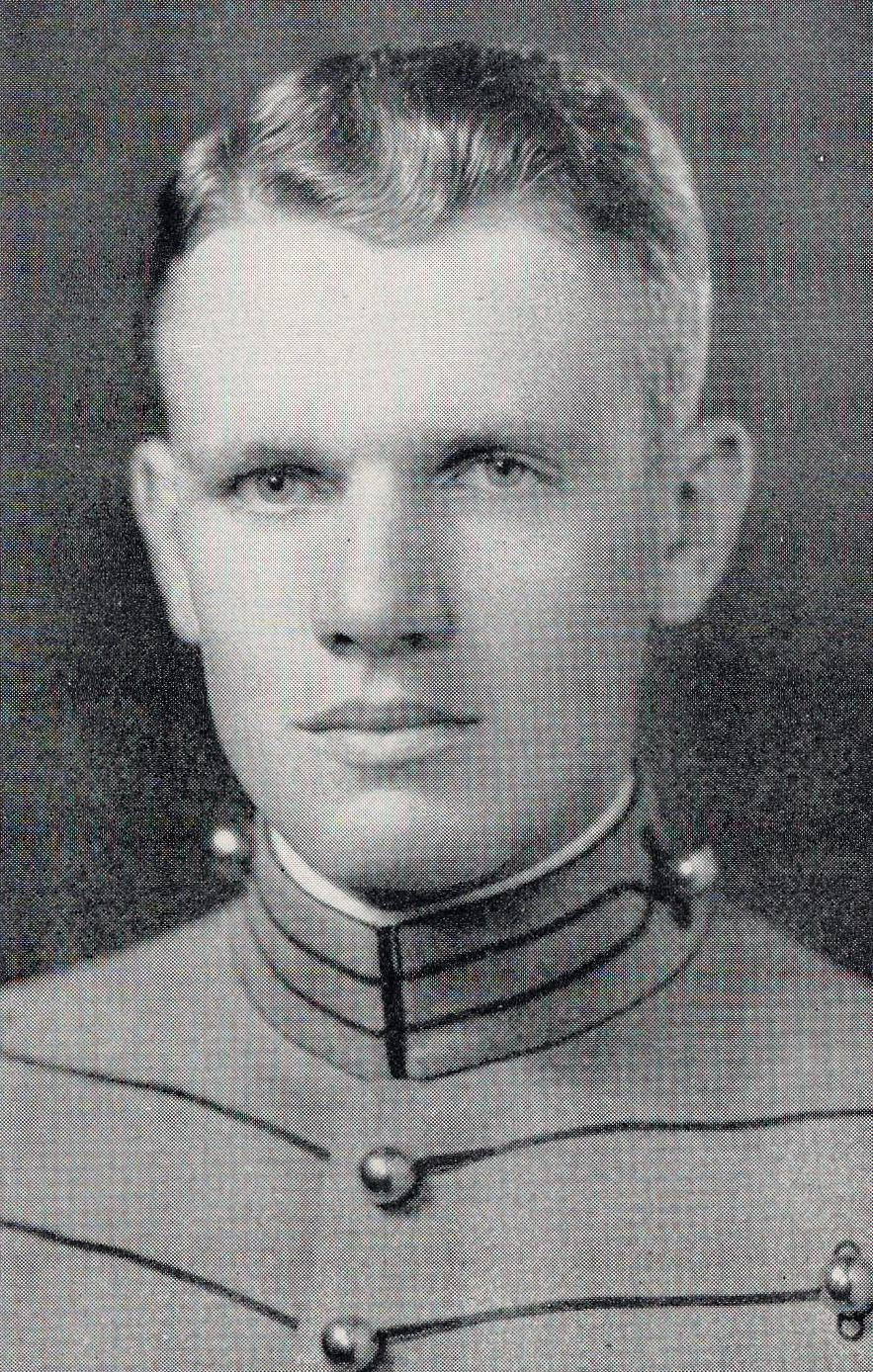
Van Sickle as a United States Military Academy cadet c. 1938

Van Sickle was born in Minot, North Dakota on July 8, 1915 to Guy R. Van Sickle and Hilda Alice (Rosenquist) Van Sickle. His military career began in 1932 when he enlisted in the North Dakota National Guard. Two years later he was appointed to the United States Military Academy at West Point. He graduated from USMA on June 14, 1938; his Cullum number was 11191. He was commissioned a second lieutenant of cavalry, assigned to the Fourth Cavalry Regiment at Fort Meade, South Dakota.

In December 1940 he was transferred to the Army Air Corps after completing flying school at Kelly Field, Texas. He served with the Army Air Forces Antisubmarine Command in the North Atlantic area early in World War II as a squadron commander and in various staff positions. In 1944 he served on the staff of the 73rd Wing on Saipan and flew 16 combat missions against Japan. At the end of the war he was deputy commander of the 497th Bombardment Group.

Van Sickle served successively in diplomatic, arctic, congressional liaison and high-level budget planning, operational and training activities. These included assignments as assistant secretary of the U.S. delegation of the United Nations Military Staff Committee; director of operations, Yukon Air Division; commander, Ladd Air Force Base, Alaska; and chief of aircraft programming in Headquarters U.S. Air Force. From 1955 to 1957 he commanded the 28th Bombardment Wing (Strategic Air Command) at Ellsworth Air Force Base, South Dakota.

In April 1957 Van Sickle was assigned to the United States-Taiwan Defense Command as assistant chief of staff for operations, promoted to brigadier general, and named chief of staff in October 1958. Generaliasimo Chiang Kai-shek personally awarded him the Order of the Cloud and Banner for his service during the 1958 Taiwan Straits crisis. His next assignment was to Headquarters Pacific Air Forces at Hickam Air Force Base, Hawaii, where he served as assistant chief of staff for operations until 1961.

He was then assigned to Mather Air Force Base, California, as commander of the 3535th Navigator Training Wing. In August 1963 he moved to Headquarters Air Training Command, Randolph Air Force Base, Texas, as deputy chief of staff, flying training and was promoted to the grade of major general in June 1964.

On January 15, 1965, he assumed command of the U.S. Air Force Recruiting Service, with headquarters at Randolph Air Force Base. In November 1969 he was assigned to Air Force Headquarters in Washington, D.C., as Air Force deputy inspector general.

Van Sickle, a command pilot, rated navigator and radar observer, logged more than 7,000 hours' military flying in all types of aircraft. He graduated in 1949 from the Armed Forces Staff College, and in 1954 from the Air War College. He is well known in civil and military aviation for his widely read textbook Modern Airmanship, which deals comprehensively with flying in modern aviation. First published in 1957; a third edition of which appeared in June 1966.

He was an associate fellow of the American Institute of Aeronautics and Astronautics. He retired August 1, 1968. Van Sickle's decorations included the Legion of Merit, Bronze Star Medal, Air Medal with two oak leaf clusters and the Air Force Commendation Medal. He turned 100 in July 2015 and died in September 2019 at the age of 104.
