= Order of the Cloud and Banner =

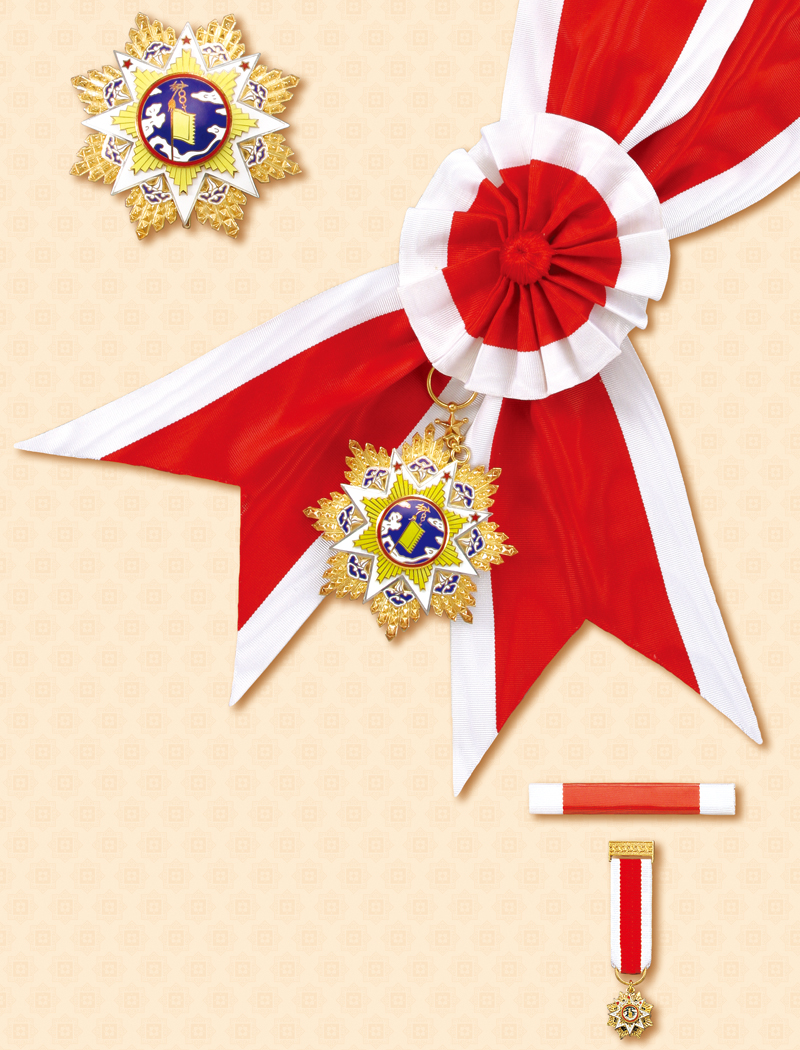
- Awarded for: Contributions to national security or quelling internal unrest
- Country: Republic of China
- Presented by: President of the Republic of China (Taiwan)
- Status: Currently awarded
- Established: 15 June 1935

Precedence
- Next (higher): Order of the Sacred Tripod
- Next (lower): Order of Loyalty and Valour

The Order of the Cloud and Banner (Chinese: 雲麾勳章/雲麾勛章) also known as the Order of the Resplendent Banner is a military award of the Republic of China. It was instituted on June 15, 1935 and is awarded in nine grades for contributions to national security. The insignia of the order features a fluttering yellow flag, surrounded by white clouds on a blue field. This image is surrounded by golden rays.

== Grades ==
The order is divided into nine grades, they are as follows:

Grade	Name	Grade	Ribbon
1st	Order of the Cloud and Banner (雲麾勳章)	with Special Grand Cordon (特種大綬)	
2nd	Order of the Cloud and Banner (雲麾勳章)	with Grand Cordon (大綬)	
3rd	Order of the Cloud and Banner (雲麾勳章)	with Yellow Grand Cordon (黃色大綬)	
4th	Order of the Cloud and Banner (雲麾勳章)	with Special Cravat (特種領綬)	
5th	Order of the Cloud and Banner (雲麾勳章)	with Cravat (領綬)	
6th	Order of the Cloud and Banner (雲麾勳章)	with Special Rosette (特種襟綬附勳表)	
7th	Order of the Cloud and Banner (雲麾勳章)	with Rosette (襟綬附勳表)	
8th	Order of the Cloud and Banner (雲麾勳章)	with Special Ribbon (特種襟綬)	
9th	Order of the Cloud and Banner (雲麾勳章)	with Ribbon (襟綬)	

== Recipients ==
=== International ===
- Brian Michael Adams
- Edward McGill Alexander
- John R. Allen
- Henry H. Arnold
- Claude Auchinleck
- Daniel E. Barbey
- Paul David Miller
- Sylvester R. Foley Jr.
- David C. Jones
- Carlisle Trost
- Robert O. Bare
- Thomas B. Hayward
- Gilbert Bartholomew RAF British Air Attaché to China 1943-46
- John Birch (missionary)
- Alan Bruce Blaxland
- Charles Bond (pilot)
- Leslie Bonnet RAF Officer
- Ronald Brockman Capt RN, admiral's secretary to SACSEA
- Wilburt S. Brown
- Henry A. Byroade
- Joseph J. Cappucci
- Bernard Chacksfield
- Prince Charles, Count of Flanders
- Levi R. Chase
- Claire Lee Chennault
- Philip Christison
- Vasily Chuikov
- Gareth Clayton (RAF officer)
- William T. Clement
- Henry Crowe (RAF officer)
- Andrew Cunningham, 1st Viscount Cunningham of Hyndhope
- Maj. Gen. Marion L. Dawson (USMC)
- Sydney de Kantzow
- Jimmy Doolittle
- Col. Jerry B. Disharoon (USAF)
- Gabriel P. Disosway
- Denis Earp
- Dr.C. Dexter Ebertz DVM
- Dwight D. Eisenhower
- Peter Fleming
- William Foster MacNeece Foster
- Julian N. Frisbie
- Charles G. Frizell
- Guy Garrod
- Goh Yong Siang
- Wallace M. Greene
- Vernon M. Guymon
- Hunter Harris Jr.
- Tex Hill
- John A. Hilger
- Bruce K. Holloway
- Frederick J. Horne
- Samuel L. Howard
- Byron F. Johnson
- Lt. General Sir Gordon Jolly
- Louis R. Jones
- C. Turner Joy
- Robert Halperin
- Stanley M. Kaufman
- Robert P. Keller
- Timofey Khryukin
- Nikolay Krylov
- Kim Hong-il
- Willard A. Kitts
- Keith G. Lindell
- John P. Lucas
- Robert B. Luckey
- Alvin Luedecke
- Rodion Malinovsky
- Dr. Harold Marcus
- Arthur T. Mason
- James M. Masters, Sr.
- John H. Masters
- Verne J. McCaul
- Lt. Col. Alfred Medendorp
- Georg Meiring
- Kirill Meretskov
- Thomas Hinman Moorer
- Louis Mountbatten, 1st Earl Mountbatten of Burma
- Ronald Gilbert Payne
- DeWitt Peck
- Richard Peirse
- Roy Benjamin Pitts
- Earl S. Piper
- Chesty Puller
- Mohan Shamsher Jang Bahadur Rana
- Edward F. Rector
- Keller E. Rockey
- Richard P. Ross Jr.
- John Dale Ryan
- Alfredo M. Santos
- Thomas G. W. Settle
- Samuel R. Shaw
- Lemuel C. Shepherd Jr.
- Austin Shofner
- Robert T. Smith
- Marcos Soliman
- George E. Stratemeyer
- Stepan Suprun
- Rafael Cavanillas Prosper
- Glen Syndercombe
- Carlos Talbott
- Neil D. Van Sickle
- Constand Viljoen
- John W. Vogt Jr.
- William Childs Westmoreland
- Lewis William Walt
- Archibald Wavell, 1st Earl Wavell
- William J. Whaling
- Isaac D. White
- Frederick L. Wieseman
- Louis E. Woods
- William A. Worton
- Harry E. Yarnell
- John C. Young
- Lt. Col Alan Engle (USAF)
- Russell F. Brown (US NAVY)
- Joffel van der Westhuizen (SANDF)
- Lt Col James R Mitchell, USAF

=== Chinese generals ===
- Chang Guan-chung
- Chen Changjie (general)
- Hu Zongnan
- Huang Wei
- Li Mi (Republic of China general)
- Qiu Qingquan
- Shen Yi-ming
- Yen Teh-fa
- Zheng Dongguo

== See also ==
- List of orders, decorations and medals of the Republic of China
