= DeWitt Peck =

U.S. Marine Corps Major General

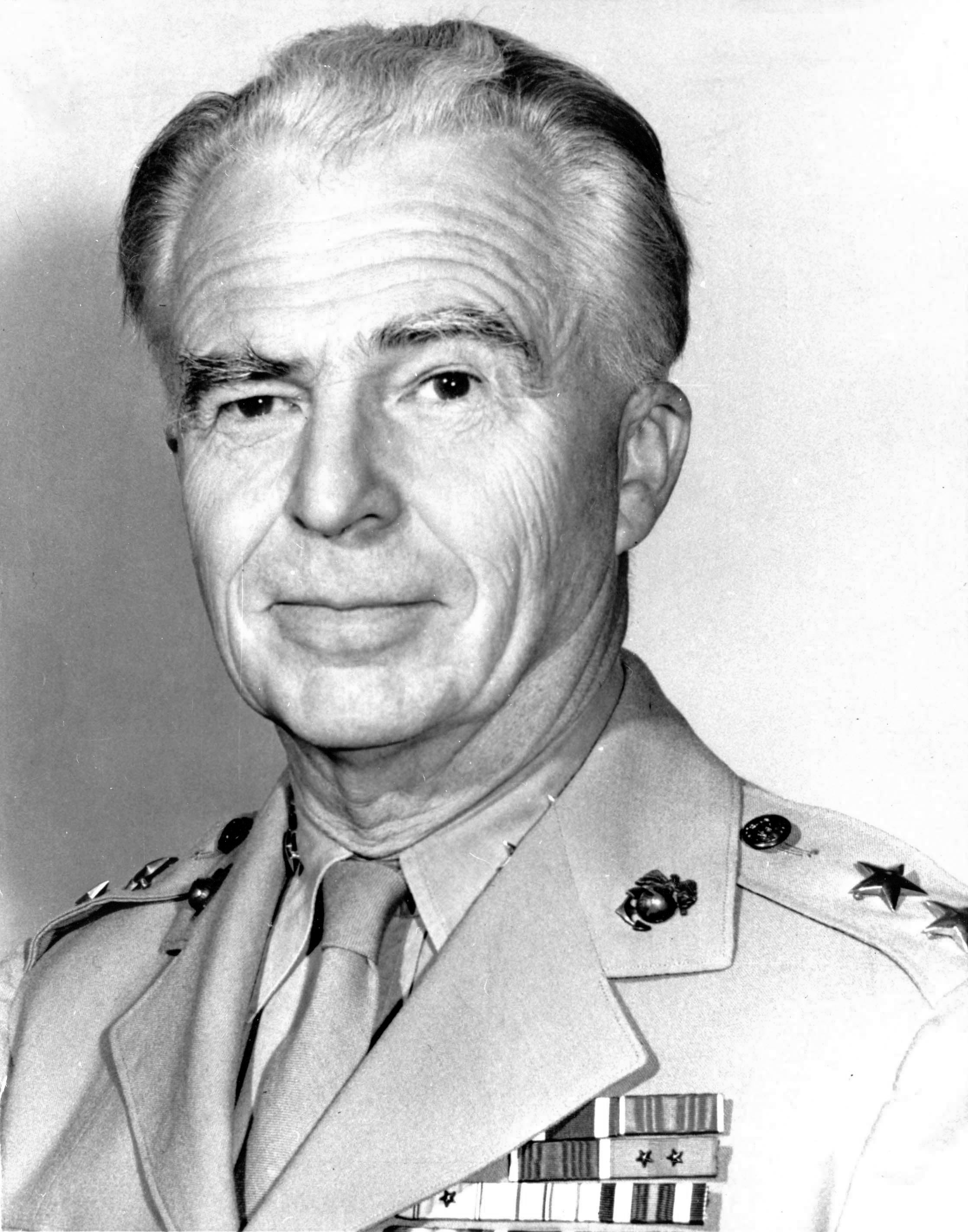
- Major General DeWitt Peck, USMC
- Born: May 29, 1894; Bakersfield, California, U.S.
- Died: January 13, 1973 (aged 78); Andrews Air Force Base, Maryland, U.S.
- Military career
- Allegiance: United States of America
- Branch: United States Marine Corps
- Service years: 1915–1946
- Rank: Major General
- Service number: 0-750
- Commands: Assist. Commandant USMC; 1st Marine Division; 4th Marine Regiment
- Conflicts: Banana Wars; Haitian Campaign; Nicaraguan Campaign; World War I; Battle of Saint-Mihiel; Battle of Blanc Mont Ridge; Chinese Civil War; Yangtze Patrol; World War II; Second Sino-Japanese War; Guadalcanal Campaign; Operation Cartwheel; Solomon Islands campaign; Chinese Civil War; Operation Beleaguer
- Awards: Legion of Merit (2); Navy Commendation Medal; Purple Heart

DeWitt Peck (May 29, 1894 – January 13, 1973) was a decorated officer of the United States Marine Corps with the rank of major general, who served as the 18th Assistant to the Major General Commandant of the Marine Corps during World War II. He later commanded the 1st Marine Division during Operation Beleaguer within Chinese Civil War.

== Early years ==
DeWitt Peck was born May 29, 1894, in Bakersfield, California, the son of Frank Harrison Peck and his second wife, Margaret Hubbard. His father was an 1880 graduate of the United States Military Academy at West Point who declined a commission in the regular army but later served as captain of Company F, 9th Regiment Infantry New York Volunteers during the Spanish–American War. His parents were natives and residents of Jefferson County, New York, but his father had a temporary job as a civil engineer in California from September 1893 to March 1896. He moved with his family to Clayton, New York, in childhood and attended schools there.

Peck was appointed to the United States Naval Academy at Annapolis, Maryland, by President William Howard Taft and graduated with a bachelor's degree in June 1915 as a second lieutenant in the Marine Corps. During his time at the academy, Peck was active on the fencing team and also served as the business manager of the Log magazine.

He attended additional training at Marine Officers School at Portsmouth, Virginia, and subsequently sailed for Haiti with the 1st Brigade of Marines in January 1916. During his time in Haiti, Peck was stationed in Jacmel and served with local Gendarmerie units.

He remained in the Caribbean until the end of March 1917, when he was transferred to the Marine detachment aboard the cruiser USS Olympia. Peck participated in the patrol duties along the East Coast with this ship. During his service on Olympia, he was promoted to the rank of first lieutenant on August 4, 1917, almost four months after the American entry into World War I.

On September 5, 1917, he was transferred as instructor to the battleship USS Louisiana, which was used as training ship for midshipmen and naval militia units. Captain Peck (promoted to the rank of captain on October 3, 1917) repeatedly requested combat assignment, which was finally granted at the end of March 1918, when he was transferred to the Marine Barracks Quantico, Virginia, and subsequently sent to France.

Peck arrived to Brest on June 8, 1918, and finally joined the 5th Marine Regiment on August 22, 1918. Captain Peck was appointed commanding officer of the 55th Company, 2nd Battalion and led his unit through the Battle of Saint-Mihiel. He was wounded by the effects of combat gas during the Battle of Blanc Mont Ridge on October 4, 1918, and relieved by another late general officer, Lemuel C. Shepherd.

== Between the wars ==
Peck returned to his unit after his recovery and participated in the Occupation duties in Germany until 25 June 1919, when he was ordered to the United States. Upon his return, Peck reported at Headquarters Marine Corps in Washington, D.C., and was assigned as an instructor in the school of musketry at Marine Barracks Quantico, Virginia. He was subsequently sent to the Marine barracks at Guantanamo Bay Naval Base at the end of July 1922 and remained there until November 1924, when he was transferred to the 1st Brigade of Marines and sailed again to Haiti.

In June 1924, Peck returned to the United States and was assigned to the Marine Corps School at Quantico as a student within Field Officers Course. Upon his graduation, he served as an instructor at Marine Corps School until 1927, when he was assigned for studies to Command and General Staff College at Fort Leavenworth, Kansas. He graduated the following year and returned as an instructor to Marine Corps School at Quantico. While serving in this capacity, he was promoted to the rank of major on 2 January 1929.

The sea duties came in May 1929, when he was appointed squadron Marine officer aboard the cruiser USS Galveston and sailed for Nicaragua, where he participated as an intelligence officer in the Nicaraguan Electoral mission until June 1931. For his service during the elections, Peck was decorated with Nicaraguan Cross of Valor with Diploma from the Government of Nicaragua.

His assignment was again with his well-known Marine Corps School at Quantico, where he served again as an instructor. While serving there, he was promoted to the rank of lieutenant colonel on 29 May 1934. Peck was ordered to the Naval War College at Newport, Rhode Island, in June 1935 and graduated one year later. As an experienced teacher, he remained at the Naval War College as an instructor until June 1938, when he was assigned to the Fleet Marine Force in San Diego. Peck was promoted to the rank of colonel on 1 February 1939.

== World War II ==
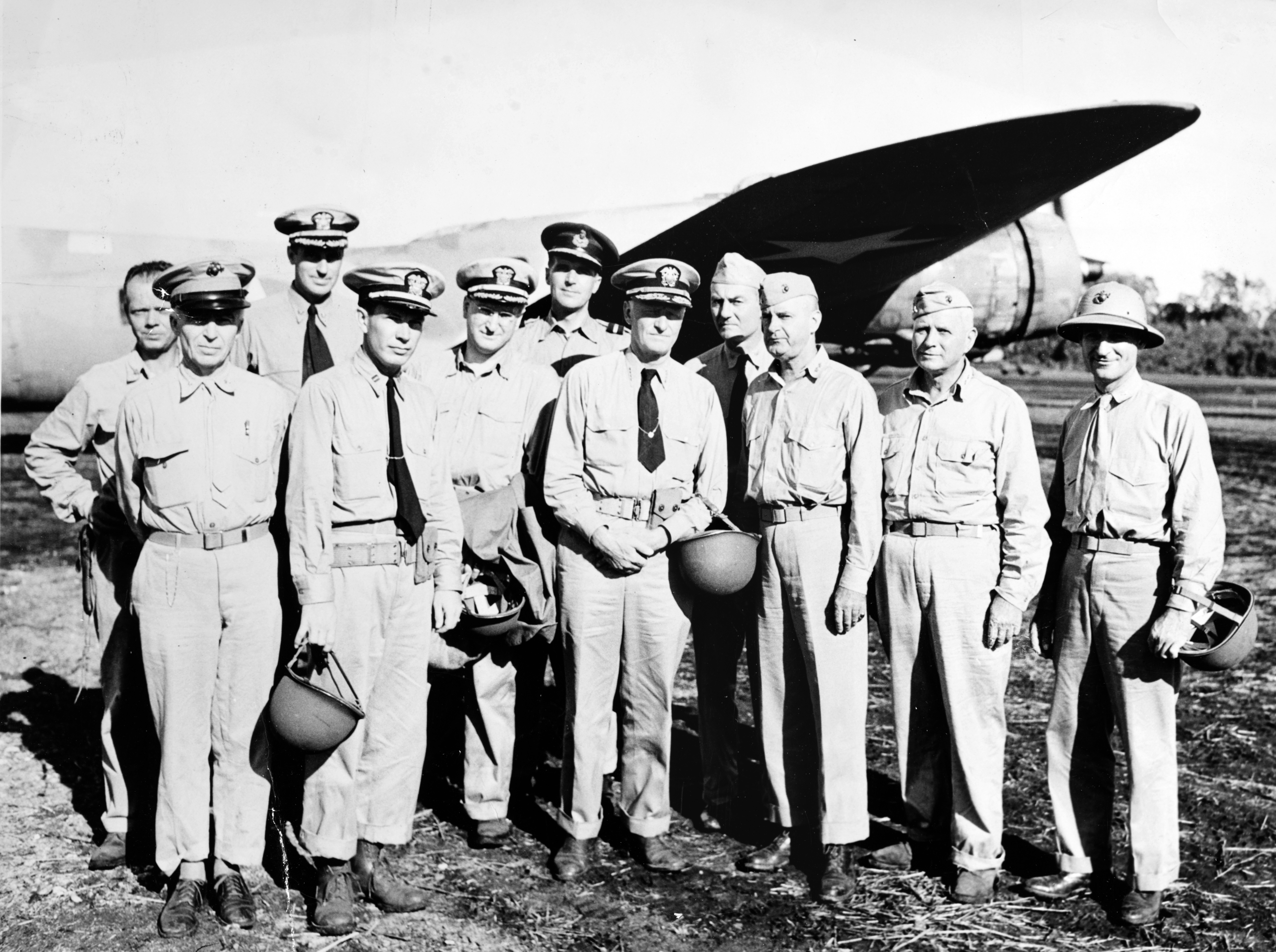
Admiral Chester W. Nimitz, USN, CINCPAC, is shown with some of his staff officers and others at Guadalcanal Airfield, 30 September 1942. L to R: Commander Compton (Eng. Off. In SUBDIV 20), Brigadier General DeWitt Peck, USMC, Captain W.M. Callaghan, USN, Lieutenant H.A. Lamar, USNR, Captain John R. Redman, USN, Air Commo. Victor Goddard, RNZAF, Admiral Nimitz, Captain Ralph A. Ofstie, USN, Major General Alexander Vandegrift, USMC, Brigadier General Roy S. Geiger, USMC and Colonel Omar T. Pfeiffer, USMC.

Colonel Peck was appointed commanding officer of the 4th Marine Regiment (China Marines) stationed in Shanghai, China, to protect American citizens and property in the Shanghai International Settlement. Peck was commended for his work during his service in China by commander in chief, Asiatic Fleet, Admiral Thomas C. Hart and received a Navy Commendation Medal.

Peck was subsequently relieved by Colonel Samuel L. Howard on May 13, 1941, and returned to Washington, D.C., where he was attached to the staff of the commander in chief, United States Fleet, Admiral Ernest King. He was directly assigned to the War Plans Division of that command and served under Richmond K. Turner until May 1942. Meanwhile, he was promoted to the rank of brigadier general in March 1942. Peck was subsequently transferred to the Southern Pacific theater and assigned as assistant chief of staff for war plans to the South Pacific area Commander, Vice Admiral Robert L. Ghormley. Admiral Ghormley was relieved by William Halsey Jr. in October 1942, and Peck remained on his staff. He subsequently participated in the planning of the allied advanced to the Central Solomon Islands for the upcoming New Georgia Campaign and flew from Pacific to Washington, D.C., in January 1943 to present the outline of the operation.

Peck also requested additional forces necessary to assault Japanese positions in the New Georgia Islands, but his plea was rejected by the Joint Chiefs of Staff (Marshall, King, Leahy and Arnold). In March 1943, he flew with Vice Admiral Turner for a meeting at Pearl Harbor, where they introduced their plan to the USAFFE Commander, General Douglas MacArthur, who approve it. Peck remained in the Pacific until July 1943, when he was ordered to Washington, D.C., and appointed to Headquarters Marine Corps as director of the Division of Plans and Policies. For his previous service in Pacific, Peck was later decorated with the Legion of Merit based on the recommendation made by Admiral Halsey.

He served in this capacity until January 1944, when he was promoted to the temporary rank of major general and appointed Assistant Commandant of the Marine Corps. Peck served in this capacity for the duration of the war and was relieved by Major General Allen H. Turnage at the end of July 1945.

== Postwar career ==
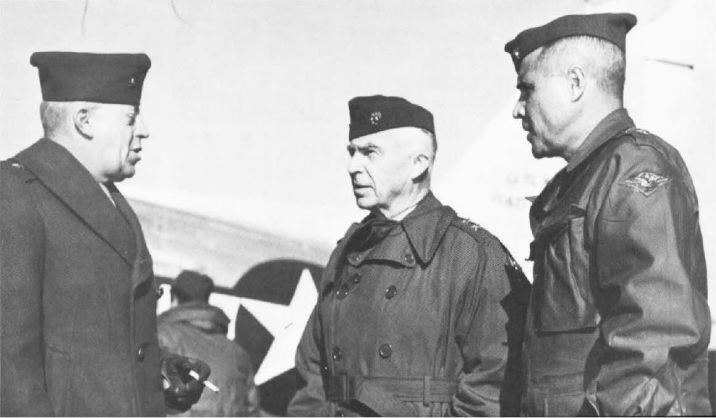
Brigadier General Merritt A. Edson, Commanding General Service Command Fleet Marine Force Pacific, Major General DeWitt Peck (CG 1st Marine Division), Louis E. Woods (CG 1st Marine Aircraft Wing), Tientsin, September 1945.

Major General Peck assumed the command of 1st Marine Division, which was stationed on Okinawa and was preparing for the planned Invasion of Japan. However, the surrender of Japan on August 15, 1945, changed those plans, and Peck with his 1st Division were sent to supervise the disarmament and repatriation of Japanese troops in North China in September of that year. Peck and his troops met a great welcome from the local people, but one month later the activity of communists guerrilla units increased. His troops were ambushed day by day, and Peck personally was pinned down by enemy fire while he was en route to the headquarters of the China Theater Commander in Qinhuangdao, General Albert C. Wedemeyer.

He remained in China until the beginning of June 1946, when he was succeeded by General Keller E. Rockey and returned to the United States. For his service there, he was decorated with his second Legion of Merit and also received the Chinese Order of the Cloud and Banner, 2nd Class by Chiang Kai-shek.

After a few months of medical leave in the United States, Peck finally retired from the Marine Corps on November 5, 1946, with the rank of major general. He resided in New York City and during 1953 served for a brief period as deputy director of manpower utilization in the Department of Defense.

Peck died on January 13, 1973, in Andrews Air Force Base Hospital, Maryland, and was buried at Arlington National Cemetery together with his wife Elizabeth Davis Peck (1889–1967). They had together one son, William Hubbard Peck (1922–1998), who also served with the Marines and retired with the rank of lieutenant colonel.

== Decorations ==
Major General Peck's ribbon bar:

1st Row	Legion of Merit with Oak Leaf Cluster		Navy Commendation Medal	
2nd Row	Purple Heart	Marine Corps Expeditionary Medal with two service stars	World War I Victory Medal with two battle clasps	Army of Occupation of Germany Medal
3rd Row	Second Nicaraguan Campaign Medal	China Service Medal	American Defense Service Medal with base clasp	American Campaign Medal
4th Row	Asiatic-Pacific Campaign Medal with two service stars	World War II Victory Medal	Nicaragua Distinguished Service Cross	Chinese Order of the Cloud and Banner, 2nd Class

== See also ==
- Operation Beleaguer

Military offices
Preceded by Keller E. Rockey	Assistant Commandant of the Marine Corps; 20 January 1944 – 30 July 1945	Succeeded by Allen H. Turnage
Preceded by Pedro del Valle	Commanding General 1st Marine Division; 8 August 1945 – 10 June 1946	Succeeded by Keller E. Rockey
Preceded by Charles I. Murray	Commanding Officer 4th Marine Regiment; 3 January 1940 – 13 May 1941	Succeeded by Samuel L. Howard
