= Samuel L. Howard =

United States Marine Corps general

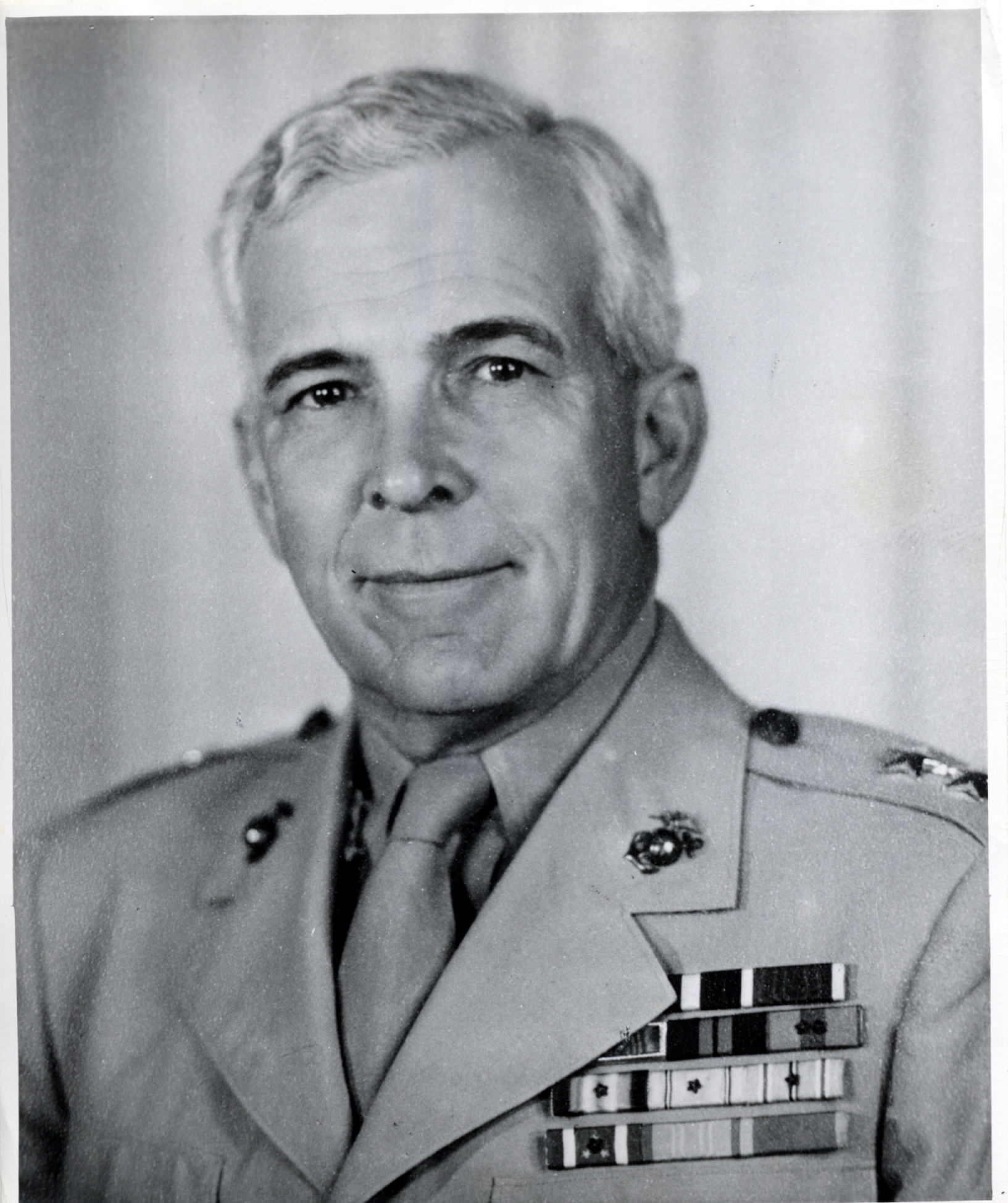
- Born: Samuel Lutz Howard; March 8, 1891; Washington, D.C., U.S.
- Died: October 12, 1960 (aged 69); Bethesda, Maryland, U.S.
- Burial place: Arlington National Cemetery
- Military career
- Allegiance: United States of America
- Branch: United States Marine Corps
- Service years: 1914–1953
- Rank: Lieutenant General
- Commands: 6th Marine Regiment; 4th Marine Regiment; 1st Marine Division; Marine Garrison Forces, Pacific
- Conflicts: Banana Wars; Haiti intervention; World War I; World War II; Second Sino-Japanese War; Philippines campaign (1941–1942); Battle of Bataan; Battle of Corregidor (surrendered); Japanese occupation of the Philippines (POW); Chinese Civil War; Operation Beleaguer; Korean War
- Awards: Navy Cross; Prisoner of War Medal; Purple Heart

Samuel Lutz Howard (March 8, 1891 – October 12, 1960) was a United States Marine Corps officer who served with distinction in the Marine Corps for thirty-eight years, attaining the rank of major general while on active duty, and subsequently promoted to Lieutenant General upon retirement.

In the early stages of World War II, then-Colonel Howard commanded the 4th Marine Regiment on Bataan and Corregidor from December 7, 1941, to May 6, 1942. For distinguished service in battles, he was awarded the Navy Cross. Captured by the Japanese at Corregidor and held as a prisoner of war from 1942 until being liberated in 1945. He was the most senior U.S. Marine to be held captive during World War II. After the war, he continued to serve in senior command posts until his retirement in 1953.

== Biography ==
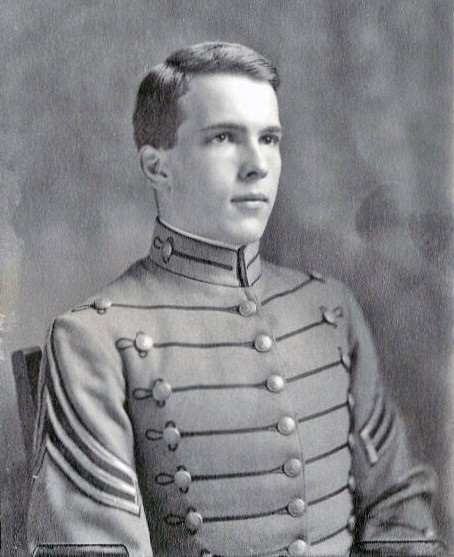
Howard as a VMI cadet in November 1911

Howard was born on March 8, 1891, in Washington, D.C. He graduated from the Virginia Military Institute in 1912. He was commissioned a second lieutenant in the Marine Corps on May 11, 1914, at which time he reported for duty at the Marine Officers' School, Marine Barracks in Norfolk, Virginia.

=== Early military career ===
In August 1915, Howard was sent on his first tour of foreign duty to Port au Prince, Haiti, with a Marine Expeditionary regiment, which was sent to Haiti after two Americans were killed by snipers.

In December 1916, he went to sea as a member of the Marine Detachment aboard the USS Wyoming (BB-32) and remained on sea duty for almost three years, assuming command of the Marine detachment, USS Georgia (BB-15) in 1917, and the Marine detachment on the USS New Mexico (BB-40) in 1918.

Two years of recruiting duty in Richmond, Virginia, and a year at the Marine Barracks, Washington, D.C., preceded the General's second tour of foreign duty, this time with the Second Brigade Marines in Santo Domingo in the Dominican Republic.

Returning to the United States in August 1924, he served at the Marine Corps Base, San Diego, California, with the Fourth Marine Regiment until assigned to the Field Officers' Course, Marine Corps Schools, Quantico, Virginia, the following year. Upon graduation in May 1926, he was assigned to duty at Marine Corps Headquarters in Washington, D.C., where he was a member of the War Plans Section, and later a member of the Commandant's Department (then John A. Lejeune).

In June 1929, Howard was sent to Haiti to join the Garde d'Haiti, where his roles included Chief of Police and Department Commander of Port-au-Prince, Haiti. He was returned to the U.S. and assumed duties with the First Battalion, Seventh Marines, until August 1934, at which time he was again transferred to Marine Corps Headquarters. From August 1934 until June 1938, he served as the executive officer, Division of Operations and Training, Headquarters Marine Corps.

In June 1938, he was ordered to the Naval War College in Newport, Rhode Island, as a student in the Senior Course. While attending the Senior Course he was promoted to colonel on October 1, 1938. Following graduation, Howard joined the Second Brigade, Fleet Marine Force, as commanding officer, Sixth Marine Regiment, later becoming Brigade Executive Officer, and finally Division Chief of Staff of the Marine Division.

=== World War II ===
Eight months prior to the attack on Pearl Harbor, Howard moved to his next duty station in China, and on May 14, 1941, he assumed of command the Fourth Marine Regiment at Shanghai. In September, with the threat of war between the United States and Japan looming, Howard made the recommendation to U.S. Navy commander of the Asiatic Fleet, Admiral Thomas Hart, that the Marine regiment be evacuated from Shanghai. Finally, on November 10, 1941, Howard received orders to prepare to evacuate.

The evacuation of the regiment began on 27 November, with the first group setting sail on the USS President Madison; Howard departed the following day on the USS President Harrison. Once at sea, the 4th Marines received their orders to proceed to the Philippines. The Madison and Harrison traveled together, accompanied by two U.S. Navy submarines. Howard arrived at Subic Bay, without incident, on December 1. The Marines were to immediately began field training. Admiral Hart met with Howard on December 3, and predicted that war with Japan was imminent. In the early hours of December 8, Asiatic Fleet headquarters received the news of the attack on Pearl Harbor.

Five days later, Howard and the regiment began the fight that lasted until the fall of Corregidor in May 1942. U.S. Army Lt. Gen.Jonathan Wainwright ordered all forces to surrender to the Japanese, upon which Colonel Howard ordered the burning of the regimental colors (flag) and the destruction of all the regiment's weapons prior to surrendering. Colonel Howard lamented that he was the first Marine to surrender a regiment.

For his distinguished service during the bitter fighting at Bataan and Corregidor, he was awarded the Navy Cross.

Navy Cross citation:

Howard's Navy Cross citation reads in part:

...Colonel Howard successfully and efficiently employed his force in the defense of Olongapo until ordered to withdraw. The Regiment was then shifted to Corregidor where it rendered outstandingly courageous service in the defense of the beaches of that island fortress...

During the prolonged siege, Colonel Howard commanded all beach defenses... Although exposed to many and repeated bombing and strafing attacks, and terrific artillery bombardments, Colonel Howard displayed outstanding qualities of courage, leadership and efficiency under most difficult and hazardous conditions.

Howard was taken captive at Corregidor on 6 May 1942 – and was the most senior U.S. Marine taken captive during World War II. He was forced to march many miles to a prison camp. He was held as a prisoner of war in the Philippines and then in Manchuria. He was liberated in September 1945.

On August 19, 1942, while a POW, Howard received a promotion to brigadier general; however, he would not formally take the rank until he was back in "the jurisdictional limits of the United States." Howard remained a prisoner of war until liberated in August 1945. He was retroactively promoted to major general, effective March 30, 1942.

He was returned to the United States, and after several months, was ordered to the Marine Barracks, Parris Island, South Carolina, as Deputy Commanding General. He served as acting commander from February 2, 1946 – February 12, 1946.

=== Post war years ===
Returning to China in September 1946, General Howard assumed command of the First Marine Division (Reinforced) with headquarters in Tientsin. Upon withdrawal of the First Marine Division from China in June 1947, he was transferred to Pearl Harbor to become commanding general, Marine Garrison Forces, Pacific, which post to be held until September 1, 1948, when he returned to the United States.

On September 10, 1948, he was ordered to Headquarters Marine Corps, Washington, D.C., as president of the Naval Examining Board and president of the Marine Corps Reserve Examining Board.

He assumed his final post as of Inspector General of the Marine Corps on June 6, 1950; holding the post for almost three years.

=== Retirement ===
Howard retired from the Marine Corps on March 31, 1953, and was advanced to the grade of lieutenant general.

Howard died on October 12, 1960 at the Bethesda Naval Hospital and was buried at Arlington National Cemetery. He left behind his widow, Marianna (née Gray) Howard, and two daughters, Nancy and Mary Elizabeth.

== Awards and decorations ==
Lieutenant General Howard's decoration and medals include:

	Navy Cross		
Purple Heart	Army Distinguished Unit Badge w/ 1 oak leaf cluster	Marine Corps Expeditionary Medal w/ 2 service stars	Haitian Campaign Medal (1917)
World War I Victory Medal w/ "Atlantic Fleet" clasp	American Defense Service Medal w/ 1 service star	Asiatic-Pacific Campaign Medal w/ 1 service star	World War II Victory Medal
National Order of Honour and Merit (Haiti)	Haitian Distinguished Service Medal w/ Diploma	Grand Cordon of the Order of the Cloud and Banner (China)	Philippine Defense Medal with star

== See also ==
- Bataan Death March - deadly forced march of POWs from the Bataan peninsula to the Japanese prison camp, Camp O'Donnell

== Sources ==
This article incorporates text in the public domain from the United States Marine Corps.

- "Lieutenant General Samuel L. Howard, USMC". Who's Who in Marine Corps History. History Division, United States Marine Corps. Archived from the original on June 15, 2011.
- "Lieutenant General Samuel L. Howard, USMC (deceased)". Marine Corps History Division, Marine Corps University.
