= John T. Walker (USMC) =

United States Marine Corps general (1893–1955)

John Thaddeus Walker
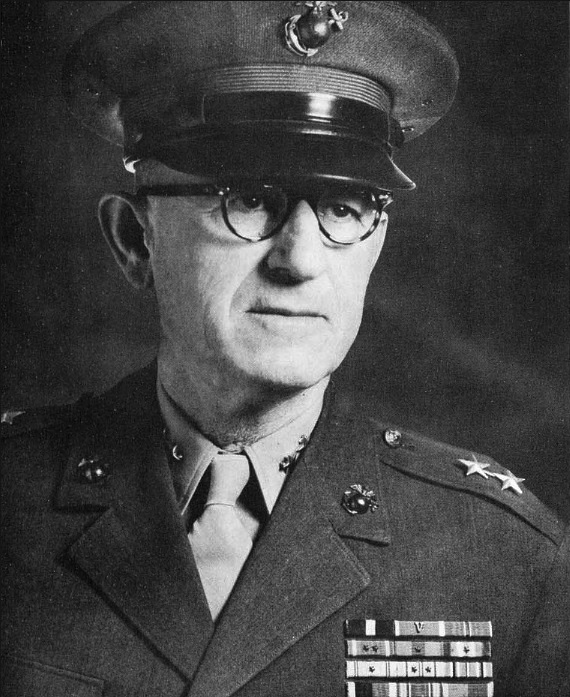
- Walker, as a major general, USMC
- Born: September 15, 1893; Azle, Texas, U.S.
- Died: February 22, 1955 (aged 61); San Diego, California, U.S.
- Burial place: Fort Rosecrans National Cemetery
- Military career
- Allegiance: United States
- Branch: United States Marine Corps
- Service years: 1917–1954
- Rank: Lieutenant general
- Service number: 0-1205
- Commands: MCRD San Diego; ADC of 1st Marine Division; ADC of 2nd Marine Division; 3rd Marine Brigade; 22nd Marine Regiment
- Conflicts: World War I Banana Wars: Dominican Campaign'; Haitian Campaign; World War II: Battle of Eniwetok; Battle of Guam
- Awards: Navy Cross; Legion of Merit; Bronze Star Medal

John Thaddeus Walker (September 15, 1893 – February 22, 1955) was a highly decorated officer of the United States Marine Corps, who reached the rank of lieutenant general. He is most noted as commanding officer of the 22nd Marine Regiment during Battle of Eniwetok. He later served as director of personnel or commanding general of Marine Corps Recruit Depot San Diego.

== Early career ==
John T. Walker was born on September 15, 1893, in Azle, Texas. He attended the Texas A&M University and graduated in 1917 with Bachelor of Science degree in civil engineering. Young Walker was eager to see combat during World War I, he almost immediately entered the United States Marine Corps and was commissioned second lieutenant on May 23, 1917. Upon the completing of the Officer's Basic training, he was assigned as platoon leader to the 51st Company, 2nd Battalion, 5th Marine Regiment in Philadelphia.

The 5th Marines were sent overseas in June 1917, arriving in Saint-Nazaire the following month. Walker spent the next few months with intensive training for trench warfare including grenade throwing, bayonet drill, gas mask drill and weapons firing at land targets and airplanes etc. His unit subsequently went to the trenches in the Montgermont sector in March 1918 and Walker participated in its defense.

However he was ordered back to the United States in April 1918 and was appointed an instructor at Bayonet school within Marine Barracks Quantico, Virginia. Walker remained in this capacity until October 1920, when has been transferred to the 2nd Marine Brigade under Brigadier General Harry Lee and sent to Dominican Republic to fight insurgents.

The orders for return to the United States came in August 1922 and Walker has been appointed Aide-de-camp to the Commandant Norfolk Navy Yard, Rear Admiral Philip Andrews. This assignment was terminated in September 1925, when he was assigned to the Company Officers Course at Marine Corps School at Quantico. Upon the graduation in June 1926, now in the rank of captain, Walker assumed command of Marine detachment aboard the battleship USS West Virginia and participated in the ship's voyage to Australia and New Zealand.

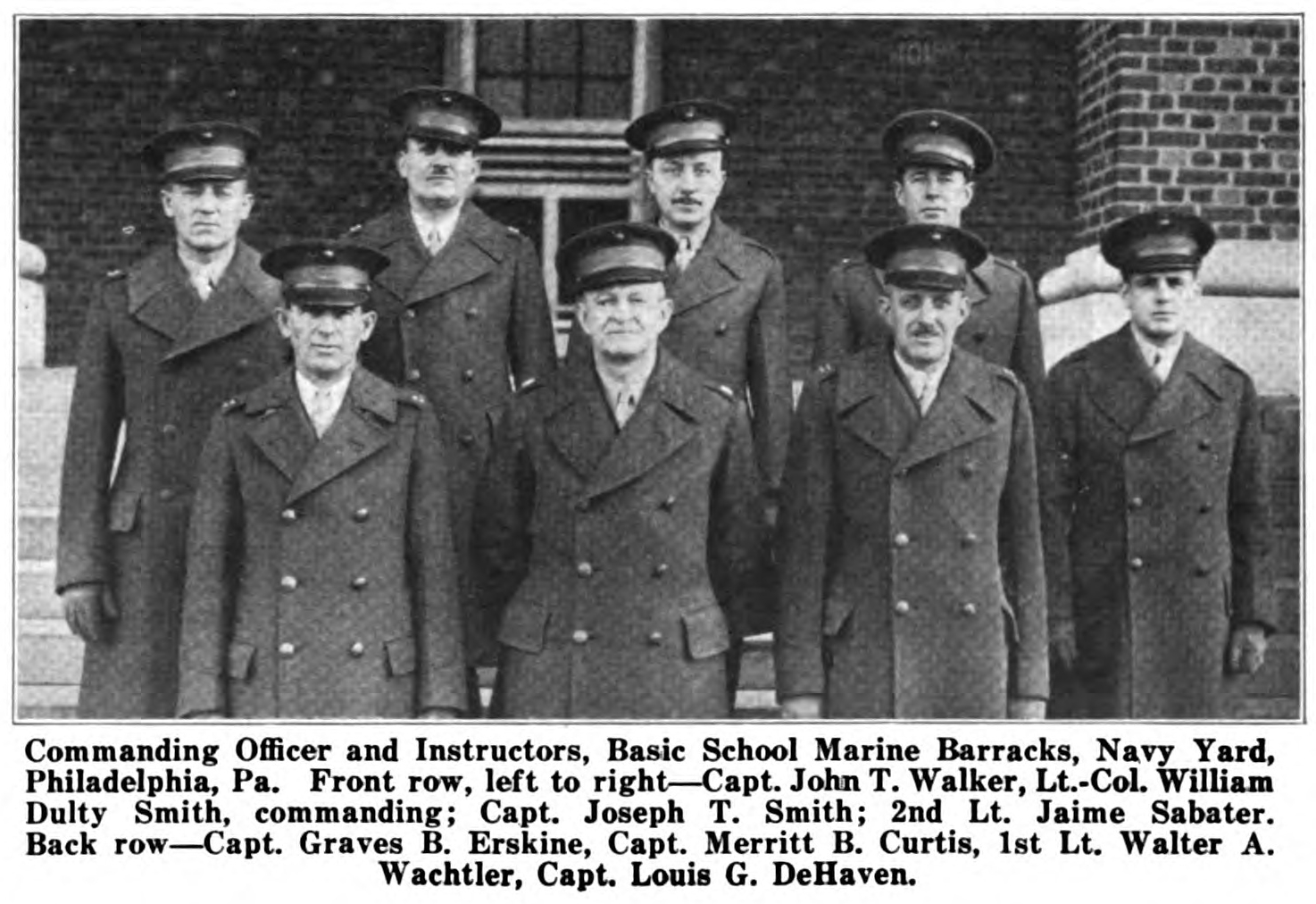
Walker (front row, far left) in Leatherneck Magazine, May 1932

Walker left sea duties in July 1928, when he was appointed an instructor at the Officers Basic School at Philadelphia Navy Yard. He left for overseas duty in July 1932, when he was sent to Haiti and subsequently commanded constabulary detachment within Garde d'Haïti. Walker finished his tour of duty in September 1934 and returned to the United States. For his service in Haiti, he was decorated with Haitian Distinguished Service Medal with Diploma by the Government of Haiti. Meanwhile, he was promoted to the rank of major in May 1934.

His next assignment was at Headquarters Marine Corps in Washington, D.C., where he served with the Division of Reserve until July 1937. Walker was subsequently transferred for another studies at Marine Corps School at Quantico, where he graduated from the Senior Officers Course in May 1938. While on studies, he was promoted to the rank of lieutenant colonel in December 1937. Walker was subsequently appointed an instructor at the school.

== World War II ==
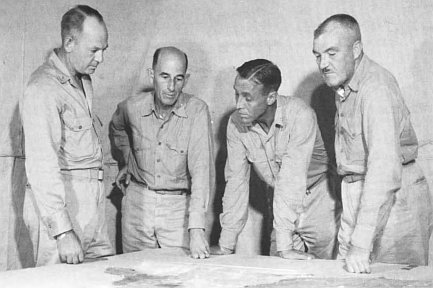
Lemuel C. Shepherd (left) speaks with members of his staff during a planning meeting prior to the Guam operation. Next to him is 1st Brigade Chief of Staff John T. Walker, Alan Shapley (4th Marines) and Merlin F. Schneider (22nd Marines)

He left Quantico in May 1940 and subsequently was transferred to the Marine Corps Base San Diego as Chief of Planning Section under Major General William P. Upshur. Walker was transferred to Egypt in July 1941, where he served as a Naval observer in Cairo. Following the Japanese Attack on Pearl Harbor in December 1941, he returned to the United States and reported for duty at San Diego with 2nd Marine Division as operations officer. Walker has been promoted to the rank of colonel on 1 January 1942 and after five months with 2nd Division, he was appointed commanding officer of the newly activated 22nd Marine Regiment at Camp Elliott, California.

The 22nd Marines were sent to the Pacific theater and subsequently arrived to Samoa at the end of June. Colonel Walker subsequently commanded the regiment, which was designated as independent unit during the island defense and also conducted the intensive jungle training. Walker did not see combat until February 1944, when his unit participated in the Battle of Eniwetok. He landed on Engebi Island on 18 February following the Naval bombardment. Walker placed his command post on the beach and participated in the hand-to-hand fighting, when almost one thousand of Japanese soldiers were killed with only 85 dead and missing plus 166 wounded US soldiers. On 22 February, Walker and his 22nd Marines invaded the Parry Island and continued to fight the enemy for next 10 hours.

After the Island Headquarters of Japanese Army was conquered, Walker radioed to the Commander of Amphibious Group Two, Rear Admiral Harry W. Hill: "I present you with the island of Parry". Walker was subsequently decorated with the military's second-highest decoration awarded for valor in combat, Navy Cross. He also received the Navy Unit Commendation.

When the 1st Provisional Marine Brigade under Brigadier General Lemuel C. Shepherd Jr. was reactivated at the beginning of April 1944, Walker had been appointed its chief of staff. Walker participated with his new command in the Recapture of Guam at the end of July 1944 and was decorated with the Legion of Merit with Combat "V" and second Navy Unit Commendation.

The 1st Provisional Brigade was disbanded in September 1944 and its units were used to form 6th Marine Division with Shepherd in command and Walker as chief of staff. Walker remained in this capacity until 16 November, when he was relieved by Colonel John C. McQueen and returned to the United States.

Upon his return, Walker was promoted to the rank of brigadier general in December 1944 and appointed assistant director of personnel at Headquarters Marine Corps. He held that position until May 1945, when he was appointed assistant division commander of 2nd Marine Division under Major General LeRoy P. Hunt. Walker subsequently participated in the Occupation duties in Japan and was later decorated with the Bronze Star for his service in this capacity.

== Postwar life ==
Walker was transferred back to the United States in April 1946 and subsequently was appointed commanding officer of the Marine Training and Replacement Command at Camp Pendleton, California. However he served in this capacity just for a brief period, because he was transferred to the command of local newly activated 3rd Marine Brigade in September 1946. This unit was used as an administrative command for combat veterans returning from occupation duties in Japan. The 3rd Brigade was absorbed by 1st Marine Division in July 1947 and Walker has been appointed Assistant Division Commander under Major General Graves B. Erskine.

This assignment lasted until February 1948, when Walker was appointed commanding general of the Troop training unit at Naval Amphibious Base Coronado. He was responsible for the amphibious training of the soldiers for Pacific Fleet. While serving in this capacity, Walker was awarded with Doctor of law degree on 13 November 1948 by his Alma mater, Texas A&M University. Walker was promoted to the rank of major general in July 1949 and transferred to Headquarters Marine Corps in Washington, D.C., where he was appointed director of personnel under his old superior, Commandant Lemuel C. Shepherd.

He took command of Marine Corps Recruit Depot San Diego in April 1952 and served in this capacity until 30 January 1954, when he was relieved by Major General John C. McQueen. Walker finally retired from the Marine Corps on 1 July 1954 and was advanced to the rank of lieutenant general on the retired list for having been specially commended in combat.

Following his retirement, Walker resided in La Jolla, California, and died on February 22, 1955, at Naval Hospital, San Diego. He is buried at Fort Rosecrans National Cemetery.

== Decorations ==
Here is the ribbon bar of Lieutenant General John T. Walker:

1st Row	Navy Cross			
2nd Row	Legion of Merit with Combat "V"	Bronze Star Medal	Navy Unit Commendation with two stars	Marine Corps Expeditionary Medal with one star
3rd Row	World War I Victory Medal with one battle clasp	American Defense Service Medal with Base Clasp	Asiatic-Pacific Campaign Medal with two 3/16 inch service stars	American Campaign Medal
4th Row	World War II Victory Medal	Navy Occupation Service Medal	National Defense Service Medal	Haitian Distinguished Service Medal with Diploma

== See also ==
6th Marine Division

Military offices
Preceded by William J. Whaling	Commanding General of Marine Corps Recruit Depot San Diego; 13 April 1952 – 30 January 1954	Succeeded by John C. McQueen
Preceded by Newly activated unit	Commanding Officer of the 22nd Marine Regiment; 1 June 1942 – March 1944	Succeeded by Merlin F. Schneider
