= 1st Provisional Marine Brigade =

Ad hoc infantry brigade of the U.S. Marine Corps

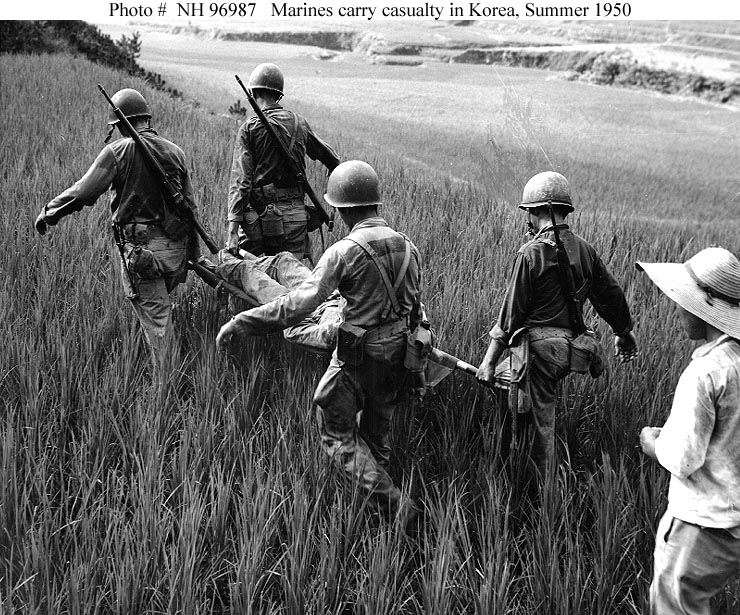
- Members of the 1st Provisional Marine Brigade carry a wounded man on a stretcher during the Battle of Pusan Perimeter in 1950.
- Active: May–July 1912; 14 July 1941 – 25 March 1942; 18 April – 9 September 1944; 1 June – 1 October 1947; 7 July – 13 September 1950
- Country: United States of America
- Allegiance: United States Marine Corps
- Branch: Active duty
- Type: Marines
- Size: Brigade
- Nickname: "Fire Brigade"
- Engagements: Negro Rebellion; World War II; Occupation of Iceland; Invasion of Guam; Korean War; Battle of Masan; 1st Battle of Naktong Bulge; 2nd Battle of Naktong Bulge

Commanders
- Notable commanders: John Marston; Lemuel C. Shepherd; Edward A. Craig

The 1st Provisional Marine Brigade was a marine brigade of the United States Marine Corps (USMC) that existed periodically from 1912 to 1950. It was an ad hoc unit formed for specific operations and not considered a "permanent" USMC unit.

The brigade saw five brief activations for service over a 40-year span. First created in 1912 for duty in Cuba following the Negro Rebellion, the brigade was not activated again until 1941 when it was hastily constructed from the 6th Marine Regiment to garrison Iceland after British forces occupied the country during World War II. The brigade saw service once more in the war during the Battle of Guam in the Pacific War, conducting an amphibious landing on that island's southern sector and subduing resistance from Japanese forces. It was activated once more in a brief organizational shift after the war.

The brigade was formed again in 1950 when it was hastily assembled for service in the Korean War. The brigade participated in a counterattack at Masan before reinforcing United States Army units during the Battle of Pusan Perimeter, and at the First and Second Battles of Naktong Bulge along the Naktong River. The brigade was deactivated for the last time when it was merged with the 1st Marine Division.

== Organization ==
The 1st Provisional Marine Brigade varied in size and structure each time it was created. Headquarters and Service Company, the company comprising the headquarters staff and support personnel, was much smaller than the equivalent company in standard Marine brigades. Each iteration of the brigade was assigned provisional military police, signal and other supporting companies and platoons. This was not an uncommon practice for the United States Marine Corps (USMC), which created such ad hoc units regularly in wartime. During World War II two other provisional Marine brigades were formed, which eventually expanded into divisions.

Component units varied considerably as well. In its first iteration in 1912, the brigade had only 1,200 men in two provisional regiments. When re-formed for duty in Iceland in 1941, it was based around volunteers from the 2nd Marine Division. Volunteers from the division were moved into the 6th Marine Regiment's 1st, 2nd and 3rd Battalions, and the 10th Marine Regiment's 2nd Battalion. It took 4,095 men from A Company of the 2nd Tank Battalion, A Company of the 2nd Service Battalion, and parachute and antitank platoons. For the Iceland deployment, the 5th Marine Defense Battalion was attached. In its 1944 iteration, the brigade was far larger than a standard brigade, 9,886 men, formed around the 4th Marine Regiment and the 22nd Marine Regiment, with provisional headquarters, military police, and signal companies and a provisional battalion of artillery. The 53rd Naval Construction Battalion was also assigned.(see: Seabees)

The brigade's Korean War organization was a 4,725-man force based around the 5th Marine Regiment and supported by Marine Aircraft Group 33, including military police, reconnaissance and intelligence companies. The attack force included the 1st Battalion, 2nd Battalion and 3rd Battalion of the 5th Marine Regiment as well as supporting companies from the 1st Combat Engineer Battalion, 1st Medical Battalion, 1st Motor Transport Battalion, 1st Ordnance Battalion, 1st Service Battalion, 1st Shore Party Battalion, 1st Signal Battalion, 1st Tank Battalion, 1st Amphibian Tractor Company, and 1st Combat Service Group.

In each of its iterations, the brigade was not organized as a permanent formation. Typically it was created only as a temporary front-line unit while larger United States Marine units were formed. The brigade would then merge with these to form a Marine division. The 1942 brigade merged with the 2nd Marine Division, the 1944 brigade was the basis for the formation of the new 6th Marine Division, and the 1950 brigade acted as an advance force for the newly reactivated 1st Marine Division before merging into that unit.

== History ==
=== Cuba ===
The 1st Provisional Marine Brigade was first created in 1912 for occupation duties in Cuba. Earlier that year, the Negro Rebellion had erupted throughout Cuba among former black slaves. A 1st Provisional Marine Regiment of 450 men under Colonel Lincoln Karmany was assembled in Philadelphia, Pennsylvania, on 22 May. At the same time, a 2nd Provisional Marine Regiment of 750 men under Colonel James Mahoney assembled at Key West, Florida. The two regiments sailed for Cuba aboard the USS Prairie, with 1st Battalion, 2nd Regiment, landing at Havana and the remainder of the force at Guantanamo. There they combined to form the 1st Provisional Marine Brigade in early June under Karmany, and the United States Marines fanned out in Oriente Province, occupying 26 towns and controlling all rail traffic in the area. The Marines protected United States sugar plantations in Siboney and El Cobre until late July when the Cuban government was able to clamp down on the revolt. At that point, the Marines pulled back to Guantanamo, disbanded the brigade and returned home.

==== Differentiation with other "1st Marine Brigades" ====
A second "1st Marine Brigade" was created in 1935, serving in Cuba in 1940, before being expanded and redesignated as the 1st Marine Division in 1941. This brigade was originally created in 1913 as the 1st Advance Force Brigade. However, the 1st Advance Force Brigade, and its descendants, was not considered a "provisional" unit. The brigade served in Puerto Rico and Mexico in 1914, as well as in the Dominican Republic (1916), and maintained a permanent establishment in Haiti from 1915 until its deactivation in 1934. It was reactivated in 1935 as the 1st Brigade before redesignation as the 1st Marine Brigade. The 1935 vintage 1st Marine Brigade was considered a separate unit and it has no lineal relationship to the 1st Provisional Marine Brigade. Additionally, yet a third "1st Marine Brigade" was created in 1956, later becoming the 1st Marine Amphibious Brigade in 1985 and the 1st Marine Expeditionary Brigade (1st MEB) in 1988. The 1st MEB is also a separate organization for purposes of lineage and shares no historical relationship with the 1st Provisional Marine Brigade.

=== World War II ===
==== Iceland ====
The insignia of the British 49th (West Riding) Infantry Division was briefly worn by the 1st Provisional Marine Brigade in Iceland.

During World War II, the United Kingdom launched an invasion of Iceland, as the British government feared that the neutral country could fall to an invasion by German forces, which had recently conquered Denmark. A British force consisting of 4 Royal Navy warships bloodlessly occupied the country, as the Icelandic government did not resist the invasion. After the United States entered the war, Iceland signed a defence agreement with the American government allowing U.S. forces to be stationed on the island as part of the Allied occupational garrison. The USMC hastily assembled the 1st Provisional Marine Brigade in Charleston, South Carolina, to move to Iceland as part of the agreement. The brigade was first activated on 14 July 1941. Its elements were taken from the 2nd Marine Division, which was training at Marine Corps Base San Diego and Camp Elliott, both in San Diego, California. This brought the force up to a strength of 4,095 men. They were the first of 28,000 men occupying Iceland under Major General Holland M. Smith and his 1st Marine Division. While the 1st Marine Division was building its forces, though, the Provisional Brigade would hold Iceland. However, priorities soon changed and the 1st Marine Division was moved elsewhere. The 1st Provisional Marine Brigade was instead joined by units of the United States Army.

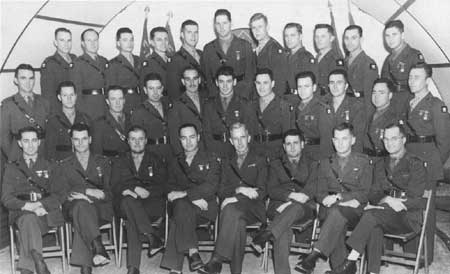
Officers of the 1st Provisional Marine Brigade pose for a photograph in Iceland in 1941.

Under the command of Brigadier General John Marston and Colonel Leo D. Hermle, the brigade sailed from San Diego to Charleston aboard the attack transports USS Heywood, USS Fuller, and USS William P. Biddle. There, they met with additional ships which sailed with their supplies as well as the remaining elements of the brigade, the 5th Defense Battalion. These elements were joined by the USS Orizaba, USS Arcturus, and USS Hamul on 27 June. They were escorted by Task Force 19, a fleet of 25 United States Navy warships including the battleships USS Arkansas and USS New York as well as the cruisers USS Brooklyn and USS Nashville. The force stopped at Newfoundland, before continuing to Iceland, landing in Reykjavík on 7 July. There they relieved the British Army 49th (West Riding) Infantry Division of control of some areas of the country, while the British continued to administer the remainder.

The British commanders distributed the 1st Provisional Marine Brigade throughout camps around the Reykjavik area, to act as an emergency force which could quickly counter any German invasion. The British gave their division patch to the brigade, and it was worn for the remainder of the Marines' time in Iceland. The Marines were joined by units of the U.S. Army and Army Air Corps in August 1941. The 1st Provisional Marine Brigade troops spent much of their time in Iceland building infrastructure and bases to fortify Iceland against potential German attack. On 22 September, the British division departed Iceland and command was assumed by the United States Army. During the winter of 1941–1942 the brigade saw no combat and spent much of its time attempting to construct fortifications and drill for combat, hampered by a lack of supplies, communications equipment, transportation, and good weather. Aside from the occasional German reconnaissance aircraft, no German forces came to Iceland.

Following the 7 December attack on Pearl Harbor, the men were informed they would be redeployed from Iceland at the beginning of 1942 and would likely see combat in the Pacific Theatre. In January 1942, the brigade began deploying back to the United States, one battalion at a time. Elements of the brigade were gradually relieved by Army units and returned to New York City aboard the USS McCawley and the US Army Transport Borinquen until March 1942, when the entire brigade was in New York. The brigade was disbanded in New York City on 25 March 1942, and its component elements were reassigned to the 2nd Marine Division. Most of them were immediately dispatched to California and by the end of the year most of the Marines had been transferred to units fighting in the Guadalcanal Campaign.

==== Guam ====
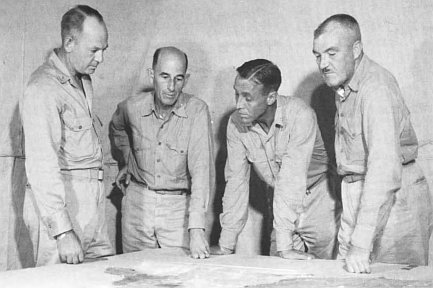
Lemuel C. Shepherd (left) speaks with members of his staff during a planning meeting prior to the Guam operation. Next to him is 1st Brigade Chief of Staff John T. Walker, Alan Shapley (4th Marines) and Merlin F. Schneider (22nd Marines)

On 18 April 1944, the 1st Provisional Marine Brigade was again activated, this time at Guadalcanal, and placed in reserve for a time, commanded by Brigadier General Lemuel C. Shepherd. In July, it was moved to the Marshall Islands for a planned invasion of Guam, an island under the control of the Empire of Japan. This much larger brigade was built around the 4th and 22nd Marine Regiments with supporting units, and comprised 9,886 Marines. The brigade was assigned to III Amphibious Corps, a force almost 67,000 strong, in anticipation of a 15 July invasion of Guam's southern beaches, in conjunction with a northern landing by the Army's 4,500-man 305th Infantry Regiment, 77th Infantry Division. The brigade commenced training at Guadalcanal in conjunction with the 3rd Marine Division. Then, in early July, the two formations staged through the Eniwetok Atoll in preparation for the invasion.

A map of the 1944 campaign conducted by Soldiers and Marines to recapture Guam.

On 21 July at 08:32 the 22nd Marines landed on beaches around Agat while the 4th Marines landed at Bangi Point to the north. Opposing the U.S. landings were 22,000 Japanese troops stationed on the island. The most intense fighting struck the other units of III Amphibious Corps to the north, which held through heavy Japanese counterattacks. The 1st Provisional Marine Brigade encountered lighter resistance on the southern beaches, but nonetheless fought a substantial Japanese force occupying Gaan Point, between the two regiments' landing zones. Japanese defenders had built fortifications into the point, including Type 41 75 mm Mountain Guns which had gone undetected in U.S. reconnaissance probes, using them to pin down 20 amphibious vehicles supporting the 22nd Marines and slow their advance. The 22nd Marines subsequently spent most of the day capturing the point against stiff Japanese resistance. Their 1st Battalion was eventually able to capture Agat, and the 2nd Battalion took Mount Alifan, 1,000 metres (3,300 ft) inland. In the meantime, the 1st Battalion of the 4th Marines took Bangi point with support from their 3rd Battalion. They then began an advance to Mount Alifan but were delayed by fierce Japanese resistance inland. At nightfall the Japanese mounted a large, coordinated counterattack which was unsuccessful. By the end of the day, the 4th and 22nd Marines were holding positions 2,000 metres (6,600 ft) into the island along a 4,500-metre (14,800 ft) front. The 305th Regimental Combat Team supported the Marines for several days before rejoining the rest of the 77th Infantry Division to the north. The 1st Brigade was 7 miles (11 km) south of the 3rd Marine Division and 77th Infantry Division landing zones to the north at Asan. On 25 July, the two forces cut off Orote Peninsula between the two landing zones, and the brigade turned west and cleared the peninsula until 29 July against heavier resistance, killing some 2,500 Japanese. It advanced north in a sweeping motion with the 4th Marines on the right, west flank and the 22nd Marines on the left, east flank, until reaching the forces on the northern beach landings.

By 28 July, the 3rd Marine Division and 77th Infantry Division had formed a continuous flank and were advancing north. On 6 August, the brigade joined them on the left, western flank. Here, Japanese forces staged last stands in their remaining fortifications, and holdouts on Mount Santa Rosa were cleared on 8 August, Ritidian Point on August 10, and Pati Point the same day. The island was declared "officially" secure at 11:31 on 10 August, after 11,000 Japanese dead had been counted. However, thousands of Japanese troops fled to the woods of Guam after the fight, and mop-up operations continued long after the island was declared secure. By V-J Day, the island had cost the Japanese 18,400 killed and 1,250 captured, and the Americans 1,700 killed and 6,000 injured. The 1st Provisional Marine Brigade, however, only assisted in mop-up operations for a month. The 4th Marines moved along the north coast while the 22nd Marines patrolled inland to the south.

On 9 September 1944, the brigade was disbanded and its elements were moved to Guadalcanal where the new 6th Marine Division was forming. That division was activated on 25 September 1944. Most of the Provisional Marine Brigade units were transferred to the command of the 6th Marine Division. The 29th Marine Regiment was added to form the division. The 53rd CB was the directly assigned to III Amphibious Corps.

=== After the war ===
The 1st Provisional Marine Brigade was briefly re-formed in the post-war era on 1 June 1947, by enlarging the 1st Battalion, 11th Marines. The force served as a contingency force for the Pacific Ocean area, based in Camp Witek, Guam. However, as post-war military spending was drastically cut, the brigade at this time was far undermanned, and considered only a "paper unit". It was again "downsized" and re-designated the 1st Provisional Artillery Battalion on 1 October 1947.

=== Korean War ===
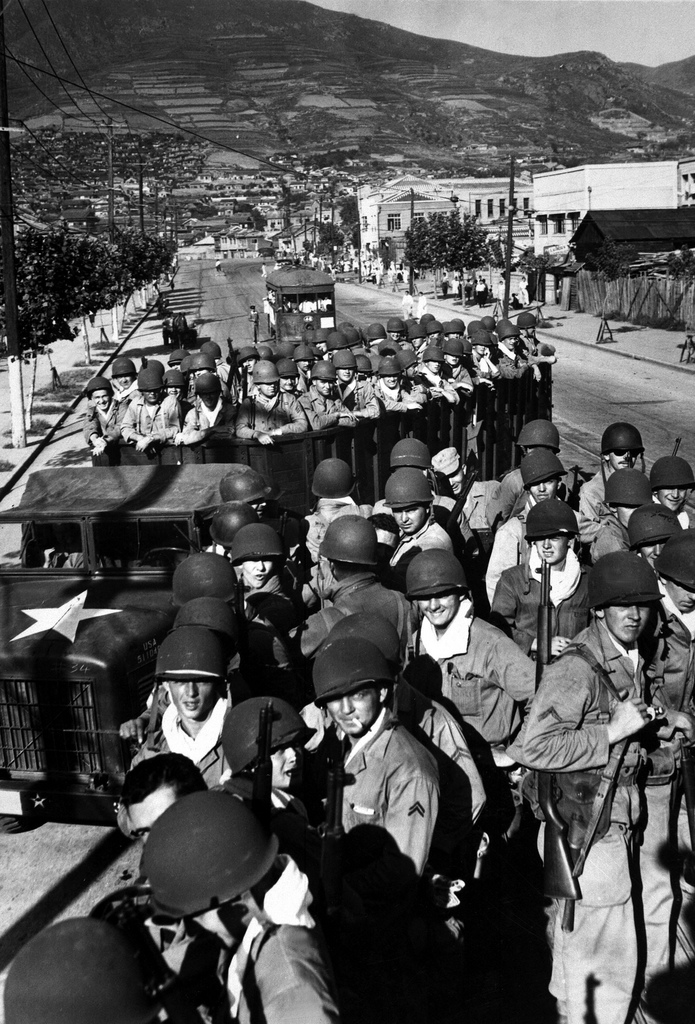
Marines disembark at Pusan on their way to the front lines in August 1950.

The USMC, which had been drastically reduced in size after World War II, was unprepared at the outset of the Korean War on 25 June 1950. The Joint Chiefs of Staff ordered the Marine Corps to ready a 15,000-man division for duty in Korea as a part of the United Nations Command being created there. The Marine Corps began rebuilding the 1st Marine Division to wartime strength, but in the meantime assembled a 4,725-man force around the 5th Marine Regiment to assist in the war effort as quickly as possible. On 7 July the 1st Provisional Marine Brigade was reactivated in California. One week later it sailed from Long Beach and San Diego. The regiment, which had originally been slated for landing in Japan, bypassed that country and landed at Pusan in South Korea on 3 August. As it sailed to Korea, it was put under the command of Brigadier General Edward A. Craig, who met the brigade in-country. The brigade was supported by Marine Aircraft Group 33, and became a subordinate unit of the Eighth United States Army under Lieutenant General Walton Walker, who placed it in his reserve.

==== Task Force Kean ====
The brigade was immediately moved to Masan, the westernmost flank of the Pusan Perimeter, which the Eighth Army had set up to resist the North Korean Army which was attempting to overrun the UN forces. The brigade joined the U.S. 25th Infantry Division and the 5th Regimental Combat Team, under Major General William B. Kean. The three units together formed "Task Force Kean", a formation of about 20,000 men.

General Walker and the Eighth Army began preparing a counteroffensive, the first conducted by the UN in the war, for 6 August. It would kick off with an attack by the U.S. reserve units on the Masan area to secure Chinju from the North Korean 6th Division, followed by a larger general push to the Kum River in the middle of the month. One of Walker's goals was to break up a suspected massing of North Korean troops near Taegu by forcing the diversion of some North Korean units southward. On 6 August, the Eighth Army issued the operational directive for the attack by the task force. The plan of attack was to move west from positions held near Masan, seize the Chinju Pass, and secure the line as far as the Nam River, and depended on the arrival of the entire U.S. 2nd Infantry Division, as well as three more battalions of American tanks which were en route from the United States.

Task Force Kean kicked off its attack on 7 August, moving out from Masan. The 1st Provisional Marine Brigade surged forward to Pansong, quickly inflicting 350 casualties on the North Koreans as it overran the North Korean 6th Division's headquarters. The other units of the Task Force, however, were slowed by North Korean resistance. Task Force Kean pressed on the Chindong-ni area, resulting in a confused battle where the fragmented force had to rely on air strikes and airdrops to keep it effective. Task Force Kean's offensive had collided with one being delivered simultaneously by the North Korean 6th Division.

Heavy fighting continued in the area for three days. By 9 August, Task Force Kean was poised to retake Chinju. The task force, aided by air power, initially advanced quickly though North Korean resistance was heavy. On 10 August, the Marines picked up the advance, inadvertently encountering the North Korean 83rd Motorized Regiment of the 105th Armored Division, which was caught off-guard and attempted to withdraw. F4U Corsairs from the 1st Marine Aircraft Wing strafed the retreating column repeatedly, inflicting 200 casualties and destroying about 100 of the regiment's equipment vehicles, but 1st Provisional Marine Brigade forces were not able to follow up the attack, as they were redeployed elsewhere on the perimeter on 12 August. Task Force Kean continued forward, supported by field artillery, capturing the area around Chondong-ni. At that time, Eighth Army requested several of its units to redeploy to Taegu to be used elsewhere on the front, particularly at the Naktong Bulge.

At the end of the counteroffensive on 14 August, Task Force Kean had failed in its two objectives of diverting North Korean troops from the north and reaching the Chinju pass. The NK 6th Division had been reduced to 3,000 or 4,000 and had to replenish its ranks with South Korean conscripts from Andong. Fighting in the region continued for the rest of the month.

==== First Naktong Bulge ====
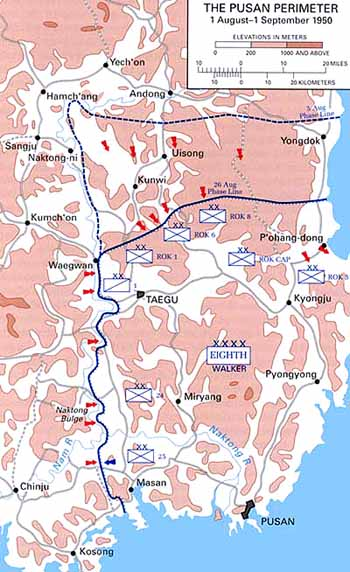
A tactical map of the Pusan Perimeter in August 1950.

Immediately north on the line, the 1st Provisional Marine Brigade was desperately needed to break a stalemate between the U.S. 24th Infantry Division and the NK 4th Division. Beginning at midnight on the night of 5–6 August, North Koreans had begun crossing the Naktong River at the Ohang ferry site, 3.5 miles (5.6 km) south of Pugong-ni and west of Yongsan, carrying light weapons and supplies over their heads or on rafts. At 02:00 on the morning of 6 August, the North Koreans began engaging the 3rd Battalion, U.S. 34th Infantry Regiment, and moved forward after a short fight, attempting to penetrate the lines to Yongsan. The North Korean infantry forced the 3rd Battalion back, and the battalion abandoned its command post to consolidate its positions. The North Koreans surprised the Americans, who had been expecting an attack from further north, and captured a large amount of American equipment. The attack threatened to split the American lines and disrupt supply lines to the north.

Repeated American attacks resulted in a stalemate. By the morning of 7 August, North Koreans were able to press forward and capture the Cloverleaf Hill and Oblong-ni Ridge, critical terrain astride the main road in the bulge area. By 16:00 that day, the U.S. 9th Infantry Regiment, U.S. 2nd Infantry Division, a newly arrived unit, was sent to the region. 24th Infantry Division commander Major General John H. Church immediately ordered it to attack the Naktong Bulge salient. Despite a tenacious attack, the 9th Infantry was only able to regain part of Cloverleaf Hill before intense fighting stalled its movement.

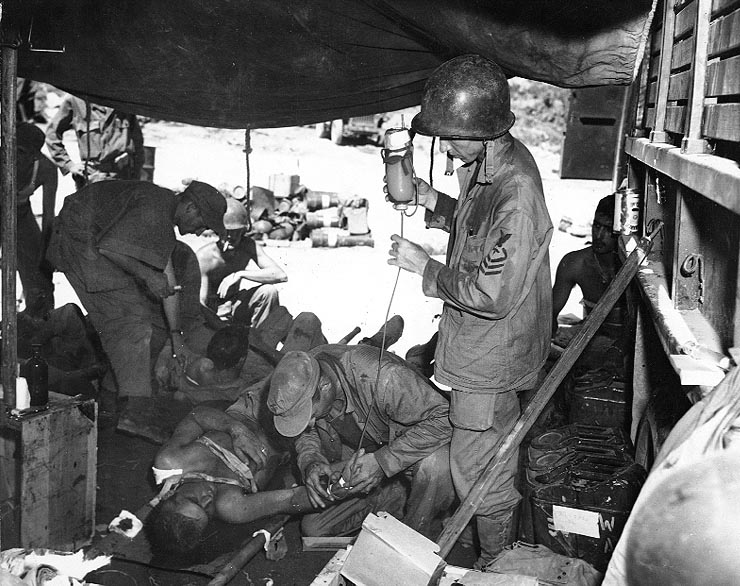
U.S. Navy medical personnel treat a casualty from the front line of the battle on 17 August.

The NK 4th Division had in the meantime constructed underwater bridges of sandbags, logs and rocks, finishing the first one the day before. It moved trucks and heavy artillery across the river over this bridge, as well as additional infantry and a few tanks. By the morning of 10 August close to two full North Korean regiments were across the river and occupying fortified positions. After a series of unsuccessful counterattacks, the threat to Yongsan necessitated more U.S. reinforcements. As U.S. casualties mounted, a frustrated Walker ordered the 1st Provisional Marine Brigade to the area. They mounted a massive offensive on Cloverleaf Hill and Obong-ni beginning at 08:00 on 17 August, unleashing all available heavy weapons: artillery, mortars, M26 Pershing tanks, and airstrikes.

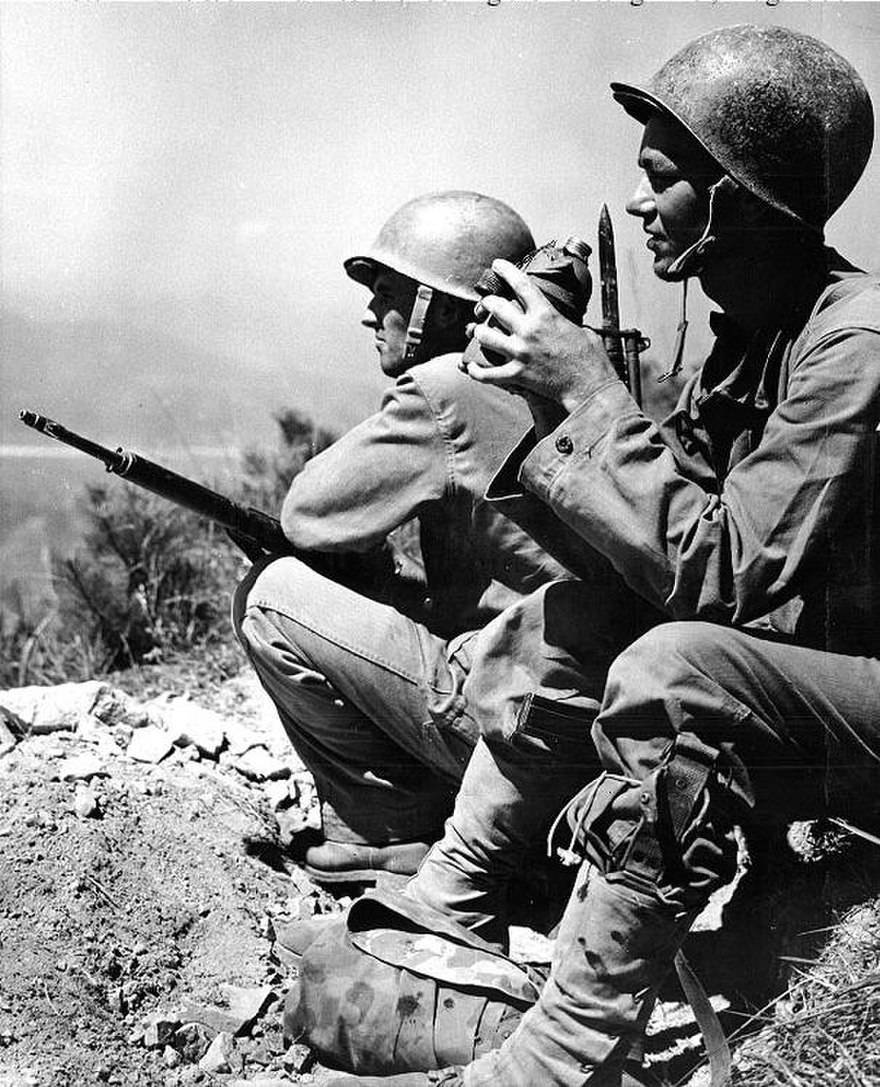
U.S. Marines resting on a newly captured position overlooking the Naktong River on 19 August.

At first, tenacious North Korean defense halted the Marines. Heavy indirect fire forced the North Koreans out of their positions before the Marines and Task Force Hill overwhelmed them, one hill at a time. The Marines approached Obong-ni first, destroying resistance on the slope with an airstrike and a barrage from U.S. tanks, but strong resistance caused heavy casualties, and they had to withdraw. The 18th North Korean Regiment, in control of the hill, mounted a disastrous counterattack in hopes of pushing the Marines back. The division's previously successful tactics of cutting off supplies and relying on surprise failed in the face of massive U.S. numerical superiority.

By nightfall on 18 August, the North Korean 4th Division had been annihilated; huge numbers of deserters had weakened its numbers during the fight, but by that time, Obong-ni and Cloverleaf Hill had been retaken by the U.S. forces. Scattered groups of North Korean soldiers fled back across the Naktong, pursued by American planes and artillery fire. The next day, the remains of 4th Division had withdrawn across the river. In their hasty retreat, they left a large number of artillery pieces and equipment behind which the Americans later pressed into service.

The battle caused heavy casualties for both sides. By the end of the fight, the NK 4th Division had only 300 or 400 men in each of its regiments. Of its original 7,000 men, the division now had a strength of only 3,500, having suffered over 1,200 killed. Several thousand members of the division deserted during the fight. Most of these men were South Korean civilians forcibly conscripted into the North Korean army. The NK 4th Division would not recover until much later in the war. The 1st Provisional Marine Brigade reported 66 Marines dead, 278 wounded, and one missing. In total, American forces suffered around 1,800 casualties during the battle, with about a third of those killed.

==== Second Naktong Bulge ====
By 1 September, the 1st Provisional Marine Brigade was down to 4,290 men, having suffered 500 casualties in its month of Korean service, and was preparing to move back to Pusan to evacuate to Japan. There, the brigade was to join with Marine reinforcements to re-form the 1st Marine Division, which would then be a part of X Corps for a counterattack at Inchon. However, the North Korean Great Naktong Offensive delayed these plans, as the brigade was needed to repel one more North Korean crossing of the Naktong River.

At the same time, the 1st and 2nd Regiments of the NK 9th Division, in their first offensive of the war, stood only a few miles short of Yongsan after a successful river crossing and penetration of the American line. Division commander Major General Pak Kyo Sam felt the chances of capturing Yongsan were strong.

On the morning of 1 September, with only the shattered remnants its E Company at hand, the U.S. 9th Infantry Regiment, 2nd Infantry Division, had virtually no troops to defend Yongsan. Division commander Major General Lawrence B. Keiser formed ad hoc units from his support troops but they were not enough to counter the North Korean attack.

On 2 September, Walker spoke by telephone with Major General Doyle O. Hickey, Deputy Chief of Staff, Far East Command, in Tokyo. He described the situation around the Perimeter and said the most serious threat was along the boundary between the U.S. 2nd and 25th Infantry Divisions. He said he had started the 1st Provisional Marine Brigade toward Yongsan but had not yet released them for commitment there and he wanted to be sure that General of the Army Douglas MacArthur approved his use of them, since he knew that this would interfere with other plans of the Far East Command. Walker said he did not think he could restore the 2nd Division lines without using them. Hickey replied that MacArthur had the day before approved the use of the Marines if and when Walker considered it necessary. A few hours after this conversation, at 13:15, Walker attached the 1st Provisional Marine Brigade to the U.S. 2nd Division and ordered a coordinated attack by all available elements of the division and the Marines, with the mission of destroying the North Koreans east of the Naktong River in the 2nd Division sector and of restoring the river line. The Marines were to be released from 2nd Division control as soon as this mission was accomplished.

==== Counteroffensives ====
A conference was held that afternoon at the U.S. 2nd Division command post, attended by leaders of the U.S. Eighth Army, 2nd Division, and 1st Provisional Marine Brigade. A decision was reached that the Marines would attack west at 08:00 on 3 September astride the Yongsan–Naktong River road, and U.S. Army troops would attack northwest above the Marines and attempt to re-establish contact with the U.S. 23rd Infantry, while the 2nd Engineer Combat Battalion with remnants of the 1st Battalion, 9th Infantry, and elements of the 72nd Tank Battalion would attack on the left flank, or south, of the Marines to reestablish contact with the 25th Division.

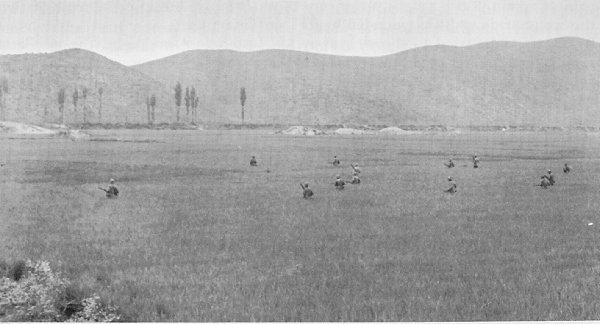
U.S. troops cross rice paddies during an attack west of Yongsan in September 1950.

The troops holding this line on the first hills west of Yongsan were G Company, 9th Infantry, north of the road running west through Kogan-ni to the Naktong; A Company, 2nd Engineer Combat Battalion, southward across the road; and, below the engineers, F Company, 9th Infantry. Between 03:00 and 04:30 on 3 September, the 1st Provisional Marine Brigade moved to forward assembly areas. The 2nd Battalion, 5th Marines, assembled north of Yongsan, the 1st Battalion, 5th Marines, south of it. The 3rd Battalion, 5th Marines, established security positions southwest of Yongsan along the approaches into the regimental sector from that direction.

Fighting began the night of 2 September, and at dawn on 3 September, U.S. troops gained the high ground which was part of the designated Marine line of departure. With help from Marine tank fire, G Company overcame heavy resistance, but this early morning battle for the line of departure delayed the planned attack. The Marine attack started at 08:55 toward North Korean-held high ground 0.5 miles (0.80 km) westward. The 1st Battalion, 5th Marines, south of the east–west road, gained its objective when North Korean soldiers broke under air attack. Air strikes, artillery concentrations, and machine gun and rifle fire of the 1st Battalion now caught North Korean reinforcements in open rice paddies moving up from the second ridge and killed most of them. In the afternoon, the 1st Battalion advanced to Hill 91.

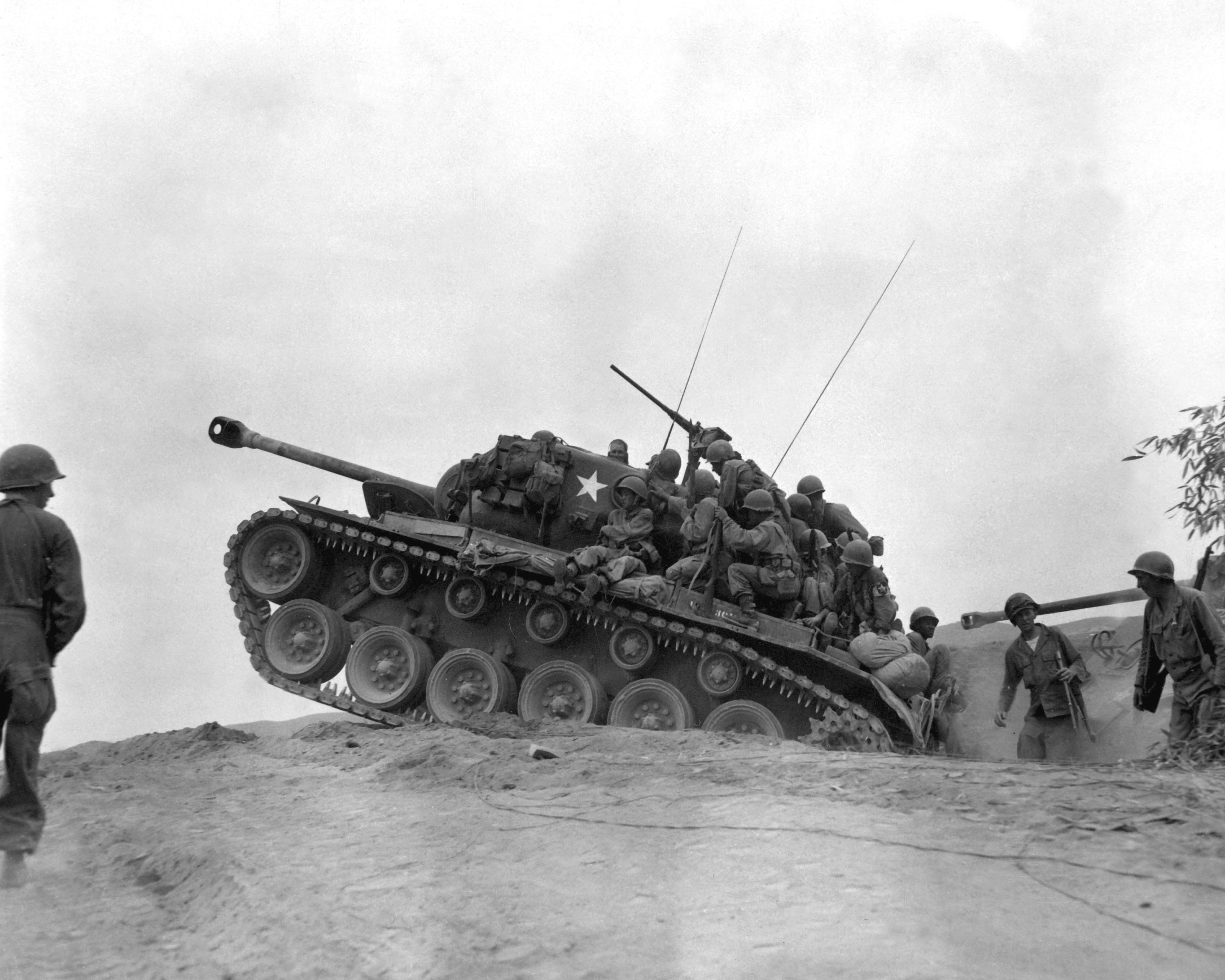
Troops of the U.S. 9th Infantry await North Korean attacks across the Naktong River, September 3.

North of the road the 2nd Battalion had a harder time, encountering heavy North Korean fire when it reached the northern tip of Hill 116, 2 miles (3.2 km) west of Yongsan. The North Koreans held the hill during the day, and at night D Company of the 5th Marines was isolated there. In the fighting west of Yongsan, Marine armor knocked out four T-34 tanks, and North Korean crew members abandoned a fifth. That night the Marines dug in on a line 2 miles (3.2 km) west of Yongsan. The 2nd Battalion had lost 18 killed and 77 wounded during the day, most of them in D Company. Total Marine casualties for 3 September were 34 killed and 157 wounded. Coordinating its attack with that of the Marines, the 9th Infantry advanced abreast of them on the north.

Just before midnight, the 3rd Battalion, 5th Marines, received orders to pass through the 2nd Battalion and continue the attack in the morning. That night torrential rains made the troops miserable. The North Koreans were unusually quiet and launched few patrols or attacks. The morning of 4 September, the weather was clear. The counterattack continued at 08:00 on 4 September, at first against little opposition. North of the road the 2nd Battalion quickly completed occupation of Hill 116, from which the North Koreans had withdrawn during the night. South of the road the 1st Battalion occupied what appeared to be a command post of the NK 9th Division. Tents were still up and equipment lay scattered about. Two abandoned T-34 tanks in excellent condition stood there. Tanks and ground troops advancing along the road found it littered with North Korean dead and destroyed and abandoned equipment. By nightfall the counterattack had gained another 3 miles (4.8 km).

That morning, 5 September, after a 10-minute artillery preparation, the American troops moved out in their third day of counterattack. It was a day of rain. As the attack progressed, the Marines approached Obong-ni Ridge and the 9th Infantry neared Cloverleaf Hill where they had fought tenaciously during the First Battle of Naktong Bulge the month before. There, at midmorning, on the high ground ahead, they could see North Korean troops digging in. The Marines approached the pass between the two hills and took positions in front of the North Korean-held high ground. At 14:30 approximately 300 North Korean infantry came from the village of Tugok and concealed positions, striking B Company on Hill 125 just north of the road and east of Tugok. Two T-34 tanks surprised and knocked out the two leading Marine M26 Pershing tanks. Since the destroyed Pershing tanks blocked fields of fire, four others withdrew to better positions. Assault teams of B Company and the 1st Battalion with 3.5-inch rocket launchers rushed into action, took the tanks under fire, and destroyed both of them, as well as an armored personnel carrier following behind. The North Korean infantry attack was brutal and inflicted 25 casualties on B Company before reinforcements from A Company and supporting Army artillery and the Marine 81 mm mortars helped repel it. September 5 was a day of heavy casualties everywhere on the Pusan Perimeter. Army units had 102 killed, 430 wounded, and 587 missing in action for a total of 1,119 casualties. Marine units had 35 killed, 91 wounded, and none missing in action, for a total of 126 battle casualties. Total American battle casualties for the day were 1,245 men.

The American counteroffensive of 3–5 September west of Yongsan resulted in one of the bloodiest and most terrifying debacles of the war for a North Korean division, according to historians. Even though remnants of the NK 9th Division, supported by the low strength NK 4th Division, still held Obong-ni Ridge, Cloverleaf Hill, and the intervening ground back to the Naktong on 6 September, the division's offensive strength had been spent at the end of the American counterattack. The NK 9th and 4th divisions were not able to resume the offensive.

==== Deactivation ====
During the previous night, at 20:00 on 4 September, Walker had ordered the 1st Provisional Marine Brigade released from operational control of the 2nd Division effective at midnight, 5 September. At 00:15, 6 September, the Marines began leaving their lines at Obong-ni Ridge heading for Pusan. They would join the 1st Marine Regiment and 7th Marine Regiment to form the new 1st Marine Division.

Walker had protested in vain against releasing the brigade, believing he needed it and all the troops then in Korea if he were to stop the North Korean offensive against the Pusan Perimeter. The order prompted a heated disagreement between Walker's command and MacArthur's command. Walker said he could not hold the Pusan Perimeter without the Marines in reserve, while MacArthur said he could not conduct the Inchon landings without the Marines. MacArthur responded by assigning two newly arrived units of the 3rd Infantry Division, the 17th Infantry Regiment and the 65th Infantry Regiment to Walker's reserves. Walker did not feel the inexperienced troops would be effective, and believed the transition endangered the Pusan Perimeter at a time when it was unclear if it could hold back the North Koreans. The brigade moved to Japan and merged with the 1st Marine Division. It was deactivated as an independent unit for the last time on 13 September 1950.

=== Other "1st Marine Brigades" ===
The original "1st Marine Brigade" was the 1st Advance Base Brigade, established in 1913. It was redesignated as the "1st Brigade" in 1914, and in 1935 as the 1st Marine Brigade, FMF. In 1941, the 1st Marine Brigade was redesignated as the 1st Marine Division.

A new permanent Marine brigade, designated as the 1st Marine Brigade was formed in Hawaii in 1956. In 1985, it was redesignated as the 1st Marine Amphibious Brigade (1st MAB), and in 1988 as the 1st Marine Expeditionary Brigade. As this brigade had relation to the 1st Provisional Marine Brigade, it did not assume its lineage.

== Unit awards ==
Though not considered a "permanent" unit, the 1st Provisional Marine Brigade was awarded campaign streamers for each of its missions, creating a lineage for the unit. Those streamers include:

Streamer	Award	Year(s)	Additional Info
	Presidential Unit Citation Streamer	1950	Pusan Perimeter
	Republic of Korea Presidential Unit Citation Streamer	1950	Pusan Perimeter
	Navy Unit Commendation	1944	Guam, Marianas Islands
	Asiatic-Pacific Campaign Streamer	1944	Guam
	World War II Victory Streamer	1945	Pacific War
	National Defense Service Streamer	1950	Korean War
	Korean Service Streamer	1950	Korean War
