= John C. McQueen =

United States Marine Corps general

John Crawford McQueen
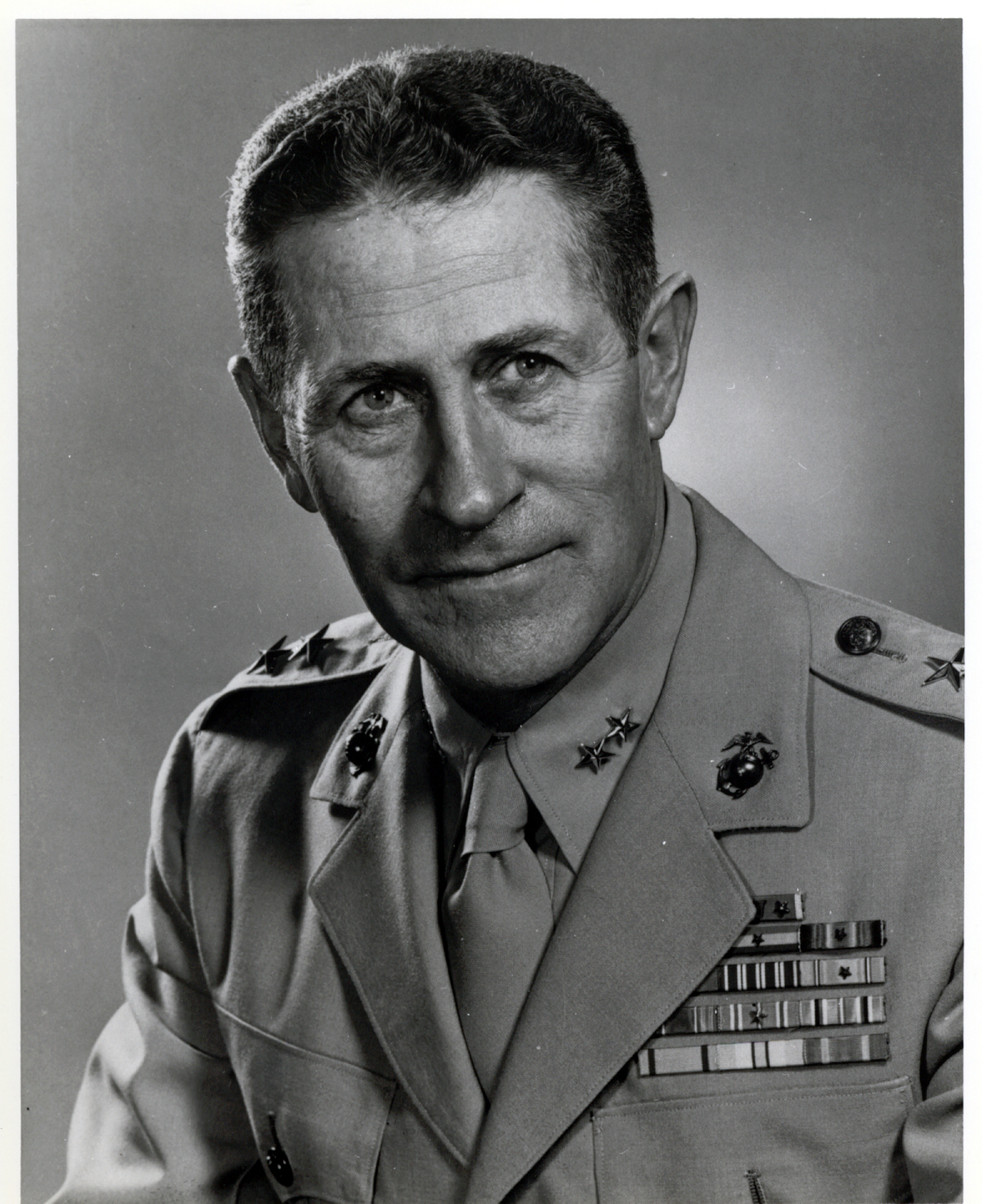
- McQueen as Major general, USMC
- Born: July 5, 1899; Carrollton, Missouri, U.S.
- Died: December 7, 1985 (aged 86); Menlo Park, California, U.S.
- Military career
- Allegiance: United States
- Branch: United States Marine Corps
- Service years: 1917–1958
- Rank: Lieutenant General
- Service number: 0-3736
- Commands: MCRD San Diego; Director of Marine Corps Reserve; CoS of 6th Marine Division
- Conflicts: World War I Haitian Campaign; Nicaraguan Campaign; World War II: Aleutian Islands Campaign; Battle of Saipan; Battle of Tinian; Recapture of Guam; Battle of Okinawa
- Awards: Legion of Merit (3); Bronze Star Medal

John Crawford McQueen (July 5, 1899 – December 7, 1985) was a decorated officer of the United States Marine Corps with the rank of lieutenant general, who served as high staff officer during Pacific War. He later served as Director of Marine Corps Reserve or commanding general of Marine Corps Recruit Depot San Diego.

== Early career ==
John C. McQueen was born on July 5, 1899, in Carrollton, Missouri, but grew up in Colorado Springs, Colorado. Following the high school, he attended the United States Naval Academy at Annapolis, Maryland, and graduated with Bachelor of Science degree in Mathematics and Engineering on June 3, 1921. McQueen was also commissioned Second lieutenant in the Marine Corps on the same date and assigned to the Basic School at Quantico Base for further officers education.

He was subsequently assigned to the First Marine Brigade and sent to Haiti. McQueen was stationed at Port-au-Prince until 1925, when he was appointed commander of the Marine detachment aboard the cruiser USS Cleveland. He subsequently sailed for Nicaragua, where Marine units were tasked with the suppression of the Sandino rebellion. McQueen was appointed commander of the Constabulary Detachment of Guardia Nacional in the town of Estelí. He was decorated with the Nicaraguan Cross of Valor with Diploma for his service in Nicaragua by the president of Nicaragua, José María Moncada.

During his service in Nicaragua, McQueen bought a jaguar kitten in the market and named him Bill. Bill sat on McQueen saddle as he led the troops on horseback through the jungles of Nicaragua, and then ran alongside them as he got bigger. He slept at the foot of McQueen's bed until he met his demise (a local farmer's shotgun) when he was caught hunting the neighbor's chickens at night.

McQueen was later appointed commander of the Marine detachment aboard the newly commissioned cruiser USS Quincy in June 1936. Quincy was subsequently ordered to Mediterranean waters to protect American interests in Spain during the height of the Spanish Civil War. McQueen and his marines assisted with the evacuation of the foreign nationals to Marseille and Villefranche, France. He returned to the United States in October 1936 and McQueen was assigned to the Division of Plans and Policies at Headquarters Marine Corps.

During the summer of 1940, McQueen received special order from Commandant of the Marine Corps, Major General Thomas Holcomb. Holcomb subsequently ordered: "Select a pilot....get a plane...and find us a training center."

Major McQueen chose Captain Verne J. McCaul, Assistant Operations and Air Liaison Officer of the 1st Marine Brigade and spent next six weeks with the flying along the East coast. They surveyed the area from Corpus Christi, Texas, to Norfolk, Virginia, until their attention was caught by the 14 miles area by the New River, North Carolina. They recommended the area to the Commandant Holcomb, who evaluated the area as suitable and ordered the construction of the training camp. The training center which was later built, get the name, Camp Lejeune. McQueen and McCaul later received Letters of Commendation from Holcomb for their efforts.

== World War II ==
During World War II in Europe, Major McQueen was ordered by Commandant, Major General Thomas Holcomb, to Great Britain, where he was assigned to the United States Embassy in London as a military observer. His main task was to consult with British military officers about amphibious tactics and operations and observed training of the British Commandos. McQueen also witnessed the German bombardment of cities and industrial centers and was concerned with the lack of security at U.S. embassy in London. The United States Ambassador to the United Kingdom, John Winant, was impressed by the McQueen's comments and appointed him embassy security officer.

His tour of duty in Europe ended in July 1941 and he subsequently returned to the United States. McQueen was subsequently promoted to the rank of lieutenant colonel and assigned to Headquarters Marine Corps in Washington, D.C., where he served as the Director of Marine Corps Intelligence with the Division of Plans and Policies under Brigadier General Charles D. Barrett. While served in this capacity, he was involved in the selection for the new marine training ground on West Coast. He and his team subsequently recommended the area of Rancho Santa Margarita, California. Later in summer 1942, Camp Pendleton was built on the place which McQueen designated.

McQueen was subsequently appointed director of Intelligence section (M-2) within Division of Plans and Policies in June 1942. He also simultaneously served as an intelligence officer on the staff of the Commander, Amphibious Forces, Pacific Fleet and participated in the planning of the battles of Kiska and Attu and its seizure and occupation. He was subsequently decorated with the Legion of Merit for his service during the campaign.

When V Amphibious Corps was activated at the end of August 1943 under the command of Lieutenant General Holland Smith, McQueen was appointed Corps Operations officer. He served in this capacity during the Marianas Islands Campaign and later during the Recapture of Guam in summer 1944 and received his second Legion of Merit, now with Combat "V".

When Holland Smith was appointed commanding general of the Fleet Marine Force, Pacific in August 1944, he requested McQueen as his operations officer. McQueen was meanwhile promoted to the rank of colonel and served in this capacity until November 1944. His next assignment was with newly activated 6th Marine Division under Major General Lemuel C. Shepherd, where he relieved Colonel John T. Walker as division chief of staff.

The 6th Division later participated in the Battle of Okinawa at the beginning of summer 1945 and Colonel McQueen participated in the battle with distinction. He received his third Legion of Merit for his part in the battle.

== Postwar service ==
Following the Surrender of Japan in August 1945, 6th Division was sent to Tsingtao, China on 11 October 1945 for the repatriation of Japanese troops. McQueen was decorated with the Bronze Star Medal for his service during the operation. He also received the Order of the Cloud and Banner 5th Class from the Government of China. McQueen was relieved by Colonel Harry E. Dunkelberger on 16 February 1946 and returned to the United States.

Upon his return home and two-month leave, McQueen reported as chief of staff at Troop Training Unit, Atlantic at Little Creek, Virginia in April 1946. He remained in this capacity until February 1948, when he has been transferred to San Francisco as commanding officer of the 12th Marine Corps Reserve District. A great highlight of his career came in May 1950, when he was promoted to the rank of brigadier general and subsequently appointed director of Marine Corps public information in September of that year.

McQueen was subsequently promoted to the rank of major general in August 1952 and appointed Director of Marine Corps Reserve. He was transferred to California in May 1954, when he relieved Major General John T. Walker as commanding general of Marine Corps Recruit Depot San Diego. In this capacity, he was responsible for the training of 21,000 new recruits each year.

His last assignment came in August 1956, when he was ordered to The Hague as Chief of the Military Assistance Advisory Group to the Netherlands. He succeeded Major General Ray A. Robinson in this capacity. McQueen retired from the military service on 1 July 1958 and was advanced to the rank of lieutenant general on the retired list for having been specially commended in combat.

Lieutenant General John C. McQueen died on December 7, 1985, at his home in Menlo Park, California, and his ashes were scattered at sea.

== Decorations ==
Here is the ribbon bar of Lieutenant General John C. McQueen:

1st Row	Legion of Merit with Combat "V" and two 5/16" gold stars		Bronze Star Medal	
2nd Row	Navy Presidential Unit Citation with one star	World War I Victory Medal with one Atlantic Fleet clasp	Marine Corps Expeditionary Medal	Second Nicaraguan Campaign Medal
3rd Row	American Defense Service Medal with Base Clasp	Asiatic-Pacific Campaign Medal with one silver 3/16 inch service star	American Campaign Medal	World War II Victory Medal
4th Row	China Service Medal	National Defense Service Medal	Nicaraguan Cross of Valor with Diploma	Order of the Cloud and Banner, 5th Grade

Military offices
Preceded by John T. Walker	Commanding General of Marine Corps Recruit Depot San Diego; 31 January 1954 – 25 July 1956	Succeeded by Thomas A. Wornham
