= 15th Marine Regiment =

- Active: November 26, 1918 – August 1, 1922; October 23, 1944 – March 26, 1946
- Country: United States of America
- Branch: United States Marine Corps
- Type: Infantry (1918–22); Artillery (1944–46)
- Part of: 6th Marine Division
- Engagements: Banana Wars; Occupation of the Dominican Republic; World War II; Volcano and Ryukyu Islands campaign; Battle of Okinawa

Commanders
- Notable commanders: Robert B. Luckey; Wilburt S. Brown

The 15th Marine Regiment (15th Marines) is an inactive United States Marine Corps infantry and later artillery regiment.

== History ==
=== Infantry regiment ===
The 15th Marines was first organized on November 26, 1918, as an infantry regiment. It was deployed to the Dominican Republic on February 26, 1919, and saw action against Dominican rebels during the American occupation of the Dominican Republic. Having been organized for possible deployment to Europe in the event that hostilities resumed, the 15th Marines remained on garrison duty in the Dominican Republic. It was deactivated on August 1, 1922 and its assets were absorbed into the 1st and 4th Regiments.

=== Artillery regiment ===
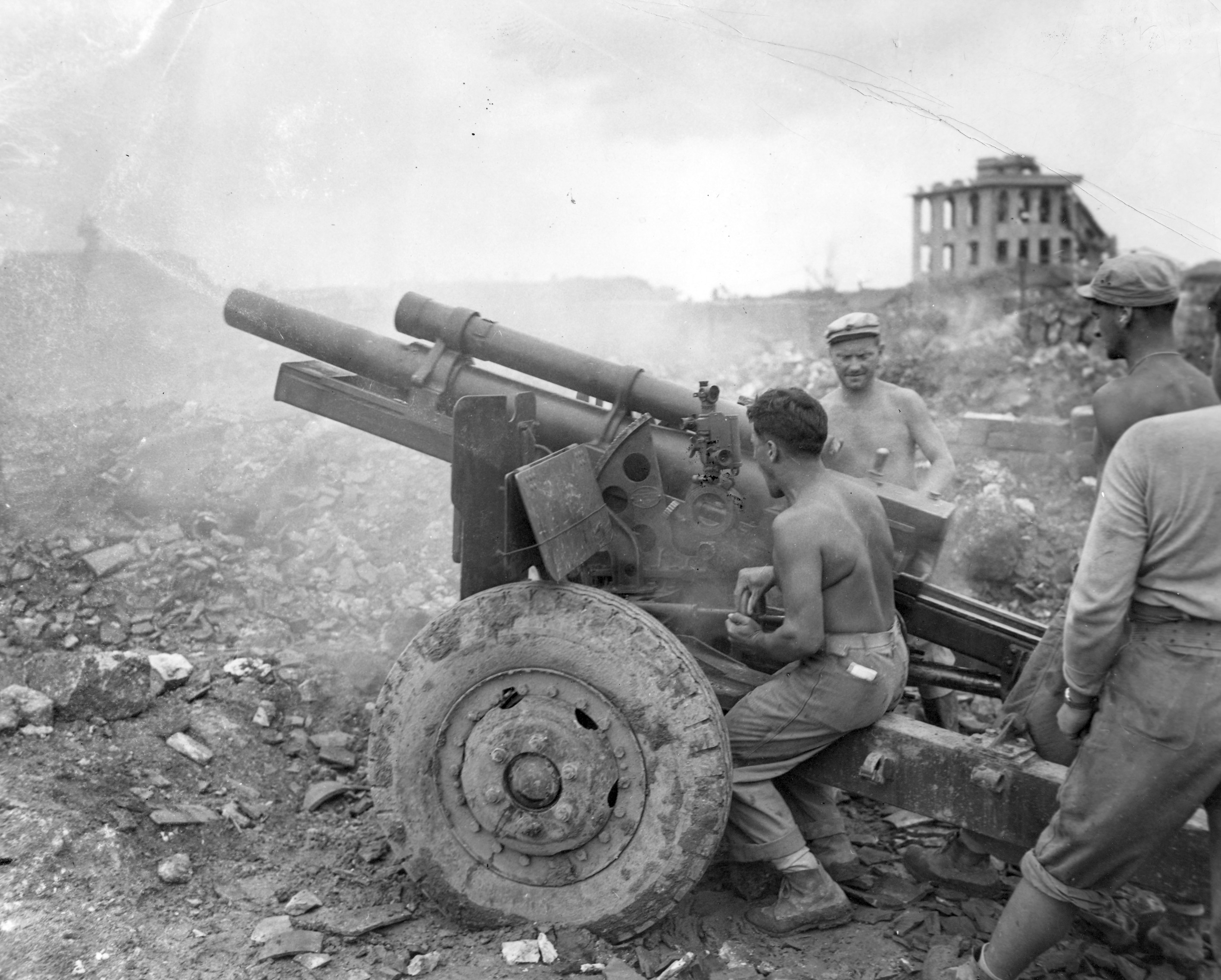
15th Marine Regiment 105mm Howitzer crew in Naha, Okinawa.

The 15th Marines was reactivated as an artillery regiment on October 23, 1944, on Guadalcanal, and assigned to the 6th Marine Division. It was formed by combining Pack Howitzer Battalions from the 4th, 22nd, and the 29th Marines. They were redesignated 1st, 2nd and 3rd Battalions, respectively. The 4th Battalion was activated on November 14, 1944. The regiment saw heavy action fighting on Okinawa and the 6th Division received the Presidential Unit Citation for their actions during the battle.

The Regiment was withdrawn from Okinawa after it was declared secure in July 1945 and was redeployed to Guam to prepare for the invasion of Japan. After the surrender of the Japanese, the Regiment was sent to Qingdao, China to accept the surrender of the Japanese in that area. The 15th Marines remained in China until its deactivation on March 26, 1946.

==== Organization ====
Battalion	Notes
Headquarters and Service Battalion 15th Marines (H&S/15)	
1st Battalion, 15th Marines (1/15)	Formerly Pack Howitzer Battalion, 4th Marines. Redesignated 1/15 on October 23, 1944.
2nd Battalion, 15th Marines (2/15)	Formerly Pack Howitzer Battalion, 22nd Marines. Redesignated 2/15 on October 23, 1944.
3rd Battalion, 15th Marines (3/15)	Formerly Pack Howitzer Battalion, 29th Marines. Redesignated 3/15 on October 23, 1944.
4th Battalion, 15th Marines (4/15)	Activated on November 14, 1944.

== Notable former members ==
- Harold Gonsalves - posthumous recipient of the Medal of Honor for actions during the Battle of Okinawa.

== See also ==
- 6th Marine Division
- 6th Marine Division on Okinawa
- Organization of the United States Marine Corps
- List of United States Marine Corps regiments
