= USS Lester =

Dealey-class destroyer escort

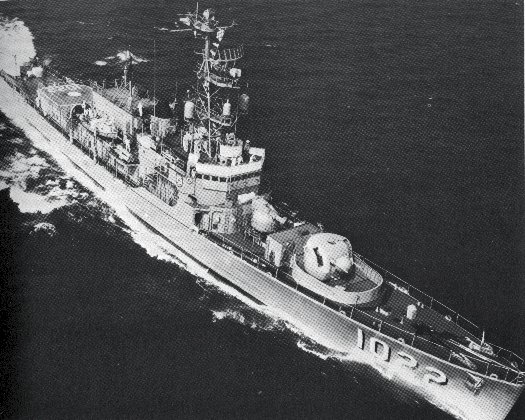

History

United States
- Name: USS Lester
- Namesake: Fred Faulkner Lester
- Builder: Defoe Shipbuilding Company
- Laid down: 2 September 1954
- Launched: 5 January 1956
- Commissioned: 14 June 1957
- Decommissioned: 14 December 1973
- Stricken: 14 December 1973
- Home port: Naval Station Newport, RI
- Fate: Sold for scrap, 18 June 1974

General characteristics
- Class & type: Dealey-class destroyer escort
- Displacement: 1,877 long tons (1,907 t) full load
- Length: 314 ft 6 in (95.86 m)
- Beam: 36 ft 9 in (11.20 m)
- Draft: 18 ft (5.5 m)
- Propulsion: 2 × Foster-Wheeler boilers; 1 × De Laval geared turbine; 20,000 shp (15 MW); 1 shaft
- Speed: 26 knots (30 mph; 48 km/h)
- Range: 6,000 nmi (11,000 km) at 12 kn (14 mph; 22 km/h)
- Complement: 12/161
- Armament: 4 × 3 inch/50 caliber guns (2x2); 1 × Weapon Alfa ASW rocket launcher; 6 × 324 mm (12.8 in) Mark 32 torpedo tubes; Mark 46 torpedoes

USS Lester (DE-1022) (1957–1973) was a United States Navy Dealey-class destroyer escort, named after Fred Faulkner Lester, a Navy Corpsman who was killed in action while assigned to the United States Marine Corps during the Battle of Okinawa in World War II. He was awarded the Medal of Honor posthumously for his heroic actions on 8 June 1945.

Lester was laid down at the Defoe Shipbuilding Company, Bay City, Michigan, on 2 September 1954; launched on 5 January 1956, sponsored by Mrs. Fred W. Lester, mother of Hospital Apprentice First Class Fred F. Lester. The ship was commissioned on 14 June 1957 and decommissioned in 1973.

== History ==
1950s

In December 1957, after shakedown cruise, Lester arrived in Newport, Rhode Island, just before Christmas, reporting for duty to Escort Squadron 14. She trained off New England until 8 February 1958, and then participated in convoy and ASW exercises off the Florida coast. On 17 February, she steamed from Savannah, Georgia, to rescue the survivors of the sunken Italian oreship Bonitoz, and then returned to Newport. On 12 May, the ship departed for the Mediterranean with units of CORTRONs 14 and 10 and the aircraft carrier Wasp. She arrived in Gibraltar on 21 May joining the 6th Fleet. When the fleet acted in Lebanon and averted world crisis in July, Lester played an important role in barrier patrol and other duties supporting the operations.

On 29 September 1958, Lester departed Gibraltar and arrived back at Newport on 7 October. For the next three months, she participated in three anti-submarine warfare exercises with Task Group Charlie, a force of ASW professionals which had the vital mission of improving convoy tactics and doctrines.

On 6 February 1959, Lester next sailed from Newport to join Task Force 86 at Trinidad. She departed Trinidad on 21 February on a combination ASW training and good will cruise to Latin America. The cruise was intended to implement hemisphere defenses and provide practical experience for the four maritime nations of eastern South America. Upon her return to Newport on 5 May, she proceeded to Boston, Massachusetts for overhaul, remaining there for the rest of the summer. She was back at Newport in early September, and sailed on 11 September for refresher training exercises at Guantanamo Bay. During this period the ship operated with units of the British, Dutch, and Greek navies. She returned to Newport on 20 October for one more exercise with Task Group Charlie.

1960s

January 1960 found Lester participating in operation "Springboard" in the Caribbean. The following months were spent in convoy and individual exercises developing ASW tactics. During September and October, the ship steamed to northern Europe to take part in NATO fall convoy exercises, after which she returned to Newport to prepare for the 1961 operation "Springboard." After a brief operation in the North Atlantic, Lester overhauled at Boston from September to 20 November, then cruised to Guantanamo Bay for refresher training.

For the next two years, Lester continued similar operations. A highlight was UNITAS III on ASW exercises with South American navies. Departing on 16 August 1962, she steamed over 18,000 miles and received more than 20,000 visitors. Lester entered Boston Naval Shipyard on 12 September for a major conversion to improve her ASW capabilities.

On 22 January 1964, Lester resumed operations from Newport. These included a joint United States-Canadian ASW operation in May and another in September following her assignment to newly formed Escort Squadron 8. In late January 1965, Lester left for Key West, Florida, for surveillance duty and to provide school services for the Fleet Sonar School. She returned to Newport in late February, and on 16 March, departed for operation "Springboard". She joined a United States-Canadian exercise in May, and again in June for operation "Pole Star." After a brief operation in July, the vessel entered Boston Naval Shipyard for a restricted availability period. On the day before Thanksgiving, Lester returned to Newport to resume her vital peacetime training mission.

On 31 January 1966, Lester began seven months of participation in the Destroyer Escort Petty Officer Training Program, better preparing over one hundred non-rated men for their eventual advancement to petty officer. In June, she also demonstrated the Navy's capabilities to cadets from the U.S. Military Academy at West Point, New York. On 15 October, she again entered Boston Naval Shipyard for overhaul.

The overhaul was completed on 24 January 1967, and Lester operated locally until sailing south in March. She served as Sonar School Ship, Key West, Florida, prior to refresher training out of Guantanamo Bay, Cuba, through April. Spending May in Newport, Lester departed on 29 January for deployment to northern Europe and the Mediterranean. She returned late in September and spent the remainder of the year in local operations out of Newport. February through June 1968 saw another voyage to north European and Mediterranean waters. Into 1969, Lester continued her vital peacekeeping operations and readiness exercises out of her home port, Newport. In 1970 it was home ported in Naples, Italy and in 1973, Norfolk, Virginia.

Decommissioned

Lester was decommissioned at Naval Station Norfolk, Virginia and stricken from the Navy Register on 14 December 1973. The ship was sold for scrapping on 18 June 1974.

== Bibliography ==
- Rodgaard, John (2023). Tailships: The Hunt for Soviet Submarines in the Mediterranean, 1970–1973. Europe @ War. Vol. 38. Helion. ISBN 978-1-914377-09-9.
