= Fred Faulkner Lester =

United States Navy hospital corpsman

- Born: April 29, 1926; Downers Grove, Illinois, US
- Died: June 8, 1945 (aged 19); Okinawa, Ryukyu Islands
- Burial place: Clarendon Hills Cemetery, Darien, Illinois
- Military career
- Allegiance: United States
- Branch: United States Navy
- Service years: 1943–1945
- Rank: Hospital Apprentice First Class
- Units: 1st Battalion, 22d Marine Regiment, 6th Marine Division
- Conflicts: World War II: Battle of Okinawa †
- Awards: Medal of Honor; Purple Heart Medal (2)

Fred Faulkner Lester (April 29, 1926 – June 8, 1945) was a United States Navy hospital corpsman who was killed in action during World War II while assigned to a Marine Corps rifle company. He was posthumously awarded the nation's highest military decoration for valor, the Medal of Honor, for heroic actions "above and beyond the call of duty" on June 8, 1945, during the Battle of Okinawa.

Lester was buried at Clarendon Hills Cemetery in Darien, Illinois. The destroyer escort USS Lester (DE-1022) was named in his honor, as was Camp Lester, a Marine Corps installation, at Chatan, Okinawa, Japan, the former site of U.S. Naval Hospital Okinawa. Lester Elementary School was established in his name in his hometown.

== Biography ==
Fred Lester was born on April 29, 1926, in Downers Grove, Illinois.

=== U.S. Navy Reserve ===
==== World War II ====
Lester enlisted in the United States Navy Reserve on November 1, 1943, at age seventeen. He completed his recruit training at Naval Training Station, Farragut, Idaho. He was promoted to seaman second class in January 1944. He attended the Naval Hospital Corps School in San Diego and after graduating, his rating was changed to hospital apprentice second class on March 3, 1944.

He was assigned to a Fleet Marine Force (FMF), Field Medical Service School, for combat field training and after completion, he was assigned to the 1st Battalion, 22nd Marine Regiment, 6th Marine Division. A hospital apprentice first class, he died after being wounded two times in action while serving with a Marine rifle company on Okinawa. He was awarded the Medal of Honor posthumously.

Lester was buried with full military honors at Clarendon Hills Cemetery, Darien, Illinois.

== Medal of Honor citation ==
Lester's Medal of Honor citation reads:

The President of the United States takes pride in presenting the MEDAL OF HONOR posthumously to

HOSPITAL APPRENTICE FIRST CLASS FRED F. LESTER
UNITED STATES NAVY RESERVE

for service as set forth in the following

CITATION:

For conspicuous gallantry and intrepidity at the risk of his life above and beyond the call of duty while serving as a Medical Corpsman with an Assault Rifle Platoon, attached to the First Battalion, Twenty-second Marines, SIXTH Marine Division, during action against enemy Japanese forces on Okinawa Shima in the Ryukyu Chain, 8 June 1945. Quick to spot a wounded marine lying in an open field beyond the front lines following the relentless assault against a strategic Japanese hill position, LESTER unhesitatingly crawled toward the casualty under a concentrated barrage from hostile machineguns, rifles, and grenades. Torn by enemy rifle bullets as he inched forward, he stoically disregarded the mounting fury of Japanese fire and his own pain to pull the wounded man toward a covered position. Struck by enemy fire a second time before he reached cover, he exerted tremendous effort and succeeded in pulling his comrade to safety where, too seriously wounded himself to administer aid, he instructed 2 of his squad in proper medical treatment of the rescued marine. Realizing that his own wounds were fatal, he staunchly refused medical attention for himself and, gathering his fast-waning strength with calm determination, coolly and expertly directed his men in the treatment of 2 other wounded marines, succumbing shortly thereafter. Completely selfless in his concern for the welfare of his fighting comrades, Lester, by his indomitable spirit, outstanding valor, and competent direction of others, had saved the life of 1 who otherwise must have perished and had contributed to the safety of countless others. LESTER's fortitude in the face of certain death sustains and enhances the highest traditions of the U.S. Naval Service. He gallantly gave his life for his country.

Harry S. Truman

== Military awards ==
Lester's military decorations and awards include:

1st row	Medal of Honor		
2nd row	Purple Heart with gold star	Combat Action Ribbon	Presidential Unit Citation
3rd row	American Campaign Medal	Asiatic-Pacific Campaign Medal with FMF device and one campaign star	World War II Victory Medal

== See also ==
- List of Medal of Honor recipients for World War II
