= 6th Marine Division =

WW2 US Marine Corps formation

- 6th Marine Division insignia
- Active: 7 September 1944 – 1 April 1946
- Country: United States of America
- Branch: United States Marine Corps
- Type: Infantry
- Role: Locate, close with, and destroy the enemy by fire and maneuver
- Nickname: The Striking Sixth or New Breed
- Engagements: World War II: Battle of Okinawa
- Decorations: Presidential Unit Citation

Commanders
- Notable commanders: Lemuel C. Shepherd, Jr.

The 6th Marine Division was a United States Marine Corps World War II infantry division formed in September 1944. During the invasion of Okinawa it saw combat at Yae-Take and Sugar Loaf Hill and was awarded a Presidential Unit Citation. The 6th Division had also prepared for the invasion of Japan before the war ended. After the war it served in Tsingtao, China, where the division was disbanded on April 1, 1946, being the only Marine division to be formed and disbanded overseas and never set foot in the United States.

== World War II ==
=== Formation on the Solomon Islands ===
The 6th Marine Division was activated on Guadalcanal in the southern Solomon Islands on September 7, 1944. The 6th Division was formed from three infantry regiments (the 4th, 22nd, and 29th Marines) and other units such as engineer, medical, pioneer, motor transport, tank, headquarters, and service battalions. The core cadre around which the division was formed was the former 1st Provisional Marine Brigade which included the 4th and 22nd Marine Regiments, plus their supporting artillery battalions; these artillery battalions were later consolidated into the 15th Marine Regiment.

The Battle of Guam ended in August 1944 and the 1st Provisional Marine Brigade was called to Guadalcanal along with the 1st Battalion, 29th Marines, which had served with the 2nd Marine Division in the Battle of Saipan on the Mariana Islands. With this core of combat veterans incorporated into the new division, the 6th was not considered "green" despite being a new formation; most of the men were veterans of at least one campaign, and many were serving a second combat tour, with half the men in the three marine regiments being combat veterans, and some units even consisted of 70% veterans. The 2nd and 3rd Battalions, 29th Marines, disembarked from the United States on 1 August 1944, and landed on Guadalcanal on 7 September 1944 to further augment the division. The now fully-manned 6th Division underwent "rugged" training on Guadalcanal between October and January before it shipped 6,000 miles to land as part of the III Amphibious Corps on Okinawa on 1 April 1945.

=== Okinawa ===
6th Marine Division Battle of Okinawa order of battle (click to enlarge)

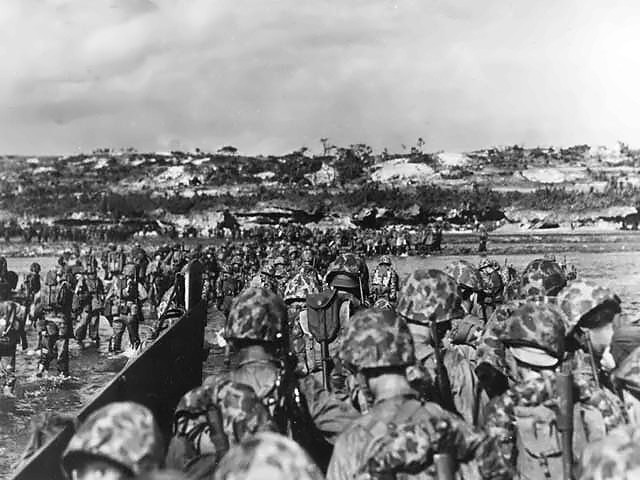
The 6th Marine Division wade ashore to support the beachhead on Okinawa, 1 April 1945.

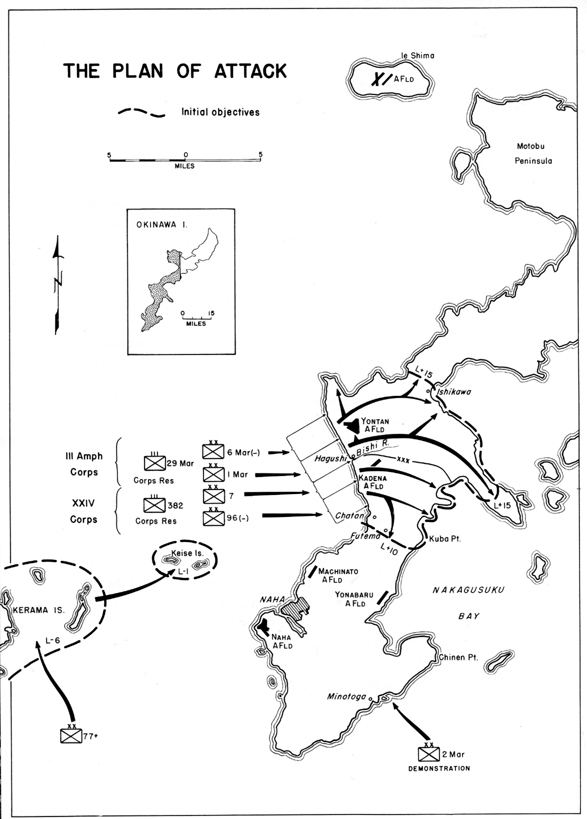
Initial plan of the assault showing the 6th Marine Division's role

The division's initial objectives in the amphibious landing were the capture of Yontan Airfield and protection of the left (north) flank. Despite a Japanese battalion in their zone the division met only light resistance. By the third day, the division was approaching Iskhikawa, twelve days ahead of schedule. By 14 April, the division had swept all through the northern Ishikawa Isthmus, 55 miles from the original landings. The division's rapid advance continued until eventually they encountered prepared and dug-in defenders at Yae-Take, where the majority of the Udo Force was entrenched. The Udo Force, or Kunigami Detachment, under Colonel Takehiko Udo was built around the 2nd Infantry Unit of the 44th Independent Mixed Brigade—reinforced by having absorbed both former sea-raiding suicide squadrons and remnants of the Battalion earlier destroyed by the 6th—was responsible for defense of the Motobu Peninsula and Ie Shima. The 6th Division's drive captured most of northern Okinawa and the Division won praise for its fast campaign – Brigadier General Oliver P. Smith wrote: "The campaign in the north should dispel the belief held by some that Marines are beach-bound and are not capable of rapid movement."

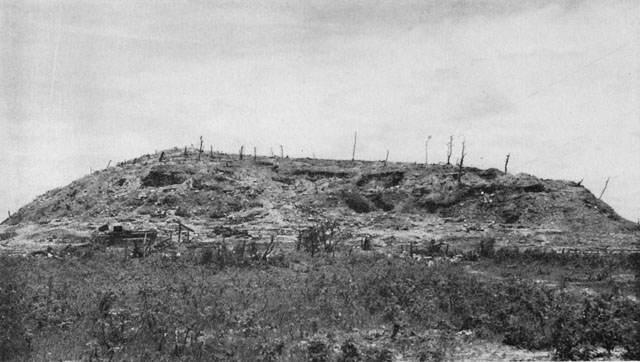
Sugar Loaf Hill as seen from the north

After heavy fighting in the south, the division was ordered to replace the Army 27th Infantry Division on the western flank. The 6th division advanced south to partake in the assault against the strong Japanese defense line, called the Shuri Line, that had been constructed across the southern coastline. The Shuri Line was located in hills that were honeycombed with caves and passages, and the Marines had to traverse the hills to cross the line. The division was ordered to capture the Sugar Loaf Hill Complex, 3 hills which formed the western anchor of the Shuri Line defense. The Marines that had assaulted the line were attacked by heavy Japanese mortar and artillery fire, which made it more difficult to secure the line. After a week of fighting, the hill had been taken.

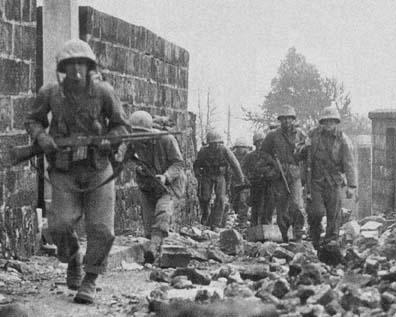
A patrol of Marines from the 6th Marine Division searches the ruins of Naha, Okinawa in April 1945.

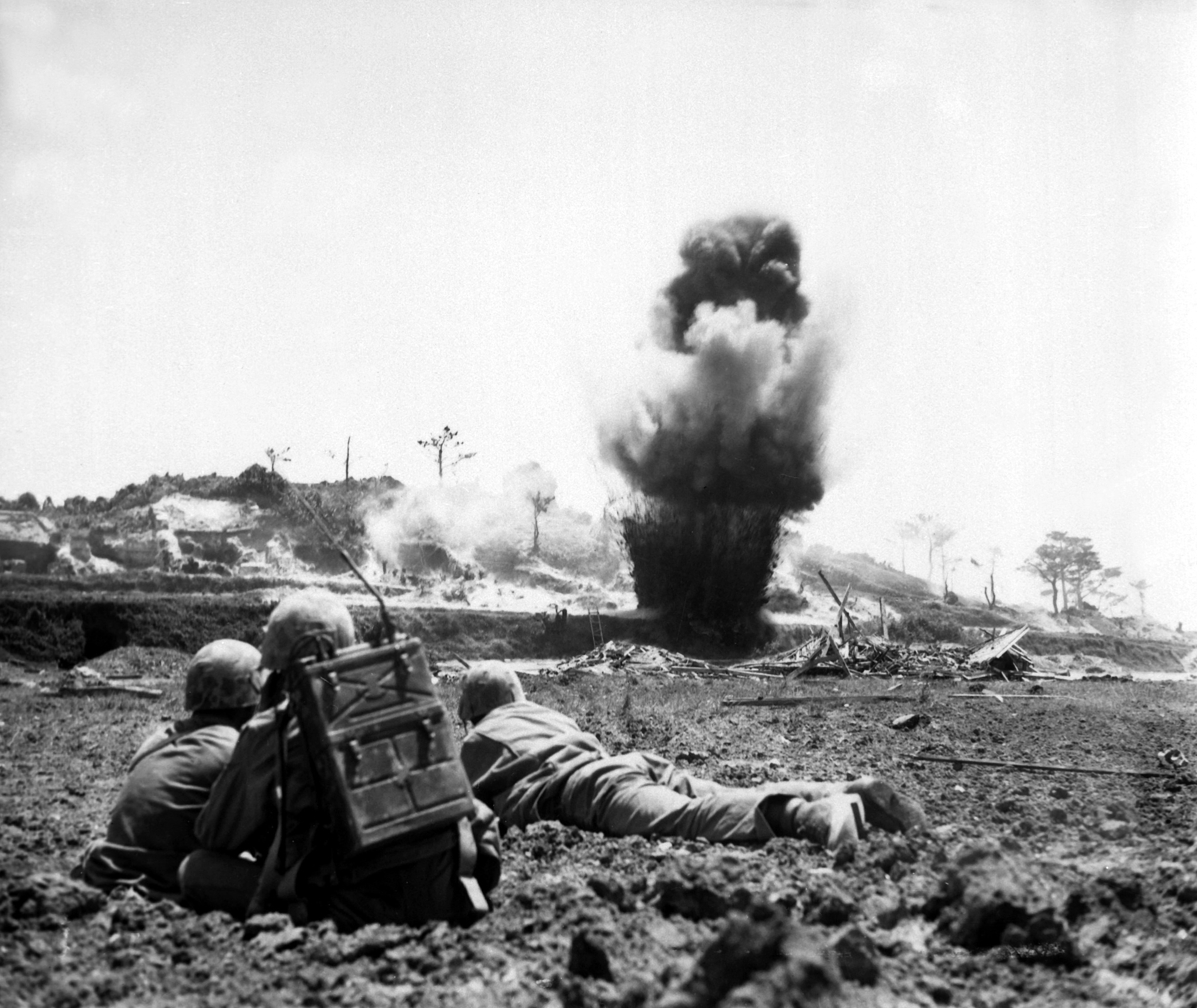
A 6th Division Marine demolition crew watches explosive charges detonate and destroy a Japanese cave, May 1945.

After Sugarloaf the Division advanced through Naha, conducted a shore-to-shore amphibious assault on, and subsequent 10-day battle to capture, the Oroku peninsula (defended by Admiral Ōta's forces), and partook in mop-up operations in the south. The battle on Okinawa ended on 21 June 1945. The Sixth division was credited with over 23,839 enemy soldiers killed or captured, and with helping to capture 2/3 of the island, but at the cost of heavy casualties, including 576 casualties on one day (May 16) alone, a day described as the "bitterest" fighting of the Okinawa campaign where "the regiments had attacked with all the effort at their command and had been unsuccessful".

For its actions at Okinawa, the 6th Marine Division (and reinforcing units) earned a Presidential Unit Citation. The citation reads:

For extraordinary heroism in action against enemy Japanese forces during the assault and capture of Okinawa, April 1 to June 21, 1945. Seizing Yontan Airfield in its initial operation, the SIXTH Marine Division, Reinforced, smashed through organized resistance to capture Ishikawa Isthmus, the town of Nago and heavily fortified Motobu Peninsula in 13 days. Later committed to the southern front, units of the Division withstood overwhelming artillery and mortar barrages, repulsed furious counterattacks and staunchly pushed over the rocky terrain to reduce almost impregnable defenses and capture Sugar Loaf Hill. Turning southeast, they took the capital city of Naha and executed surprise shore-to-shore landings on Oroku Peninsula, securing the area with its prized Naha Airfield and Harbor after nine days of fierce fighting. Reentering the lines in the south, SIXTH Division Marines sought out enemy forces entrenched in a series of rocky ridges extending to the southern tip of the island, advancing relentlessly and rendering decisive support until the last remnants of enemy opposition were exterminated and the island secured. By their valor and tenacity, the officers and men of the SIXTH Marine Division, Reinforced contributed materially to the conquest of Okinawa, and their gallantry in overcoming a fanatic enemy in the face of extraordinary danger and difficulty adds new luster to Marine Corps history, and to the traditions of the United States Naval Service.

— Secretary of the Navy James Forrestal for the President

During the war, the 6th Marine Division had two Seabee Battalions posted to it. The 53rd Naval Construction Battalion (NCB) was a component of the 1st Provisional Marine Brigade. Later the 58th NCB replaced them for the invasion of Okinawa. (see: Seabees)

=== Guam and China ===
In July 1945, the 6th division was withdrawn from Okinawa to the island of Guam to prepare for Operation Coronet, the planned invasion of Honshū, Japan that was supposed to occur in March 1946 but the Japanese surrendered in August 1945. While the 4th Marines were sent for brief occupation duty in Japan, the rest of the 6th spent September in Guam preparing for duty in China.

The division arrived in Tsingtao, China on 11 October 1945 where it remained until it was disbanded on April 1, 1946, being replaced by the 3d Marine Brigade. In its time at Tsingtao the division not only accepted the surrender of local Japanese forces (on October 25) but also oversaw their subsequent repatriation to Japan; prevented the communists from attacking the surrendered Japanese forces and dissuaded communist forces from advancing on the city, restored and maintained order, and came to be seen as the protector of minority groups in the former German concession.

== Command structure ==
The 6th Division had two commanders during its short existence:

- Major General Lemuel C. Shepherd, Jr., 7 September 1944 – 24 December 1945
- Major General Archie F. Howard, 24 December 1945 – 1 April 1946

=== Assistant Division Commander ===
- Brigadier General William T. Clement, November 1944 – 1 April 1946

=== Chief of Staff ===
- Colonel John T. Walker, 7 September 1944 – 16 November 1944
- Colonel John C. McQueen, 17 November 1944 – 16 February 1946
- Colonel Harry E. Dunkelberger, 17 February 1946 – 1 April 1946

=== Personnel Officer (G-1) ===
- Major Addison B. Overstreet, 7 September 1944 – 22 July 1945
- Colonel Karl K. Louther, 23 July 1945 – 17 November 1945
- Lieutenant Colonel Frederick Belton, 18 November 1945 – 31 March 1946

=== Intelligence Officer (G-2) ===
- Lieutenant Colonel August Larson, 7 September 1944 – 30 September 1944
- Major William R. Watson, Jr., 1 October 1944 – 9 November 1944
- Lieutenant Colonel Thomas E. Williams, 10 November 1944 – 16 February 1946
- Lieutenant Colonel Carl V. Larsen, 17 February – 31 March 1946

=== Operations Officer (G-3) ===
- Lieutenant Colonel Thomas A. Culhane, Jr., 7 September 1944 – 10 November 1944
- Lieutenant Colonel Victor H. Krulak, 11 November 1944 – 26 October 1945
- Lieutenant Colonel Wayne H. Adams, 27 October 1945 – 31 December 1945
- Lieutenant Colonel George W. Killen, 1 January 1946 – 31 March 1946

=== Logistics Officer (G-4) ===
- Lieutenant Colonel August Larson, 1 October 1944 – 17 May 1945
- Lieutenant Colonel Wayne H. Adams, 18 May 1945 – 31 December 1945
- Lieutenant Colonel Samuel R. Shaw, 1 January 1946 – 31 March 1946

=== Subordinate units ===
4th Marine Regiment

- Colonel Alan Shapley, 7 September 1944 – 3 July 1945
- Lieutenant Colonel Fred D. Beans, 4 July 1945 – 28 January 1946

15th Marine Regiment

- Colonel Wilburt S. Brown, 23 October 1944 – 17 November 1944
- Colonel Robert B. Luckey, 18 November 1944 – 15 March 1946

22nd Marine Regiment

- Colonel Merlin F. Schneider, 7 September 1944 – 16 May 1945
- Colonel Harold C. Roberts, 17 May 1945 – 18 June 1945 (KIA)
- Lieutenant Colonel August Larson, 19 June 1945 – 24 June 1945
- Colonel John D. Blanchard, 25 June 1945 – 31 March 1946

29th Marine Regiment

- Colonel Victor Bleasdale, 7 September 1944 – 14 April 1945
- Colonel William J. Whaling, 15 April 1945 – 31 March 1946

6th Tank Battalion

- Major Harry T. Milne, 29 September 1944 – 16 October 1944
- Lieutenant Colonel Robert L. Denig Jr., 17 October 1944 – 26 March 1946

== Campaign and award streamers ==
| Streamer | Award | Additional info |
|---|---|---|
| Naval Presidential Unit Streamer | Presidential Unit Citation Streamer | Okinawa, April 1 — June 30, 1945 |
| China Service Streamer | China Service Medal (Extended) | Oct. 11, 1945 — March 26, 1946 |
| Asia-Pacific Campaign Streamer | Asiatic-Pacific Campaign Medal | |
| World War II Victory Streamer | World War II Victory Medal | |

== Medal of Honor recipients ==
The Medal of Honor was awarded to five Marines and one Navy corpsman assigned to the 6th Marine Division during World War II:

- Richard E. Bush
- Henry A. Courtney Jr., USMCR (posthumous)
- James L. Day
- Harold Gonsalves (posthumous)
- Fred F. Lester, USN (posthumous)
- Robert M. McTureous Jr. (posthumous)

== See also ==
- 6th Marine Division on Okinawa film
- List of United States Marine Corps divisions
- Organization of the United States Marine Corps
