= 22nd Marine Regiment =

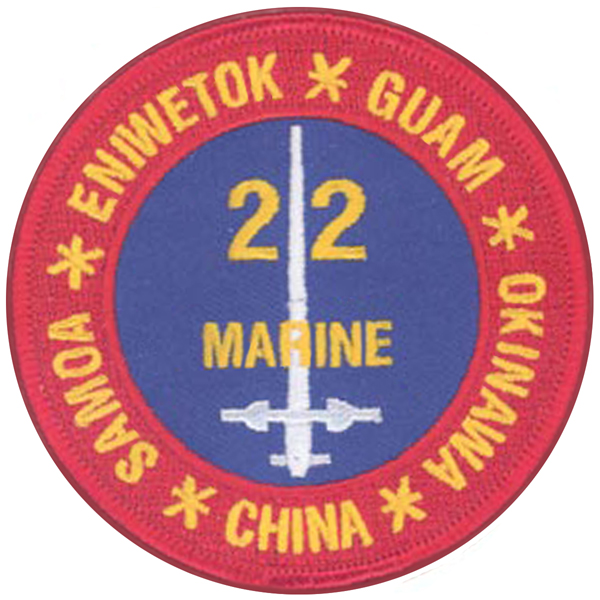
- 22nd Marines insignia
- Active: 1942–46; 1947–49
- Country: United States of America
- Branch: United States Marine Corps
- Type: Infantry regiment
- Engagements: World War II; Battle of Eniwetok; Battle of Guam; Volcano and Ryukyu Islands campaign; Battle of Okinawa
- Decorations: Navy Unit Commendation (2), Presidential Unit Citation

Commanders
- Notable commanders: John T. Walker; Merlin F. Schneider; Harold C. Roberts; August Larson; Henry W. Buse Jr. Joseph C. Burger

The 22nd Marine Regiment (22nd Marines) is an inactive United States Marine Corps infantry regiment. The regiment was commissioned in 1942 and was placed under the command of the 1st Provisional Marine Brigade in 1944, and the 6th Marine Division in 1945. It took part in fighting at the battles of Eniwetok, Guam, and Okinawa. The regiment also participated in the occupation of northern China following the war. 22nd Marines was decommissioned in March 1946.

The 22nd Marines was reactivated at Marine Corps Base Quantico, Virginia in 1947 and but was again decommissioned in October 1949.

== Components ==
The 22nd Marine Regiment was composed of three infantry battalions and one headquarters battalion. The 22nd Marines initially also had a 2nd Separate Howitzer Battalion which would eventually become a battalion within the 15th Marine Regiment of the 6th Marine Division upon its formation.

Battalions
Headquarters and Service Company, 22nd Marines
1st Battalion, 22nd Marines (1/22)
2nd Battalion, 22nd Marines (2/22)
3rd Battalion, 22nd Marines (1st Naval Construction Detachment and A Company 3rd Naval Construction Battalion). (3/22)
Weapons Company, 22nd Marines

== History ==
=== Activation ===
The 22nd Marine Regiment was commissioned on June 1, 1942, at Camp Elliot in San Diego, California (Linda Vista tent area). The first infantry regiment (regimental combat team) was designated as an "independent" unit after the start of World War II. Its first commanding officer was Colonel John T. Walker. On June 18, the 22nd Marines embarked for the Pacific theater, where the 1st and 2nd battalions were used for island defense. On Bora Bora the 1st Seabees Detachment (aka Bobcats) and a detachment of A Company 3rd CB had completed their construction projects and were en route to rejoin the Construction Battalion at Noumea when they were diverted and made 3/22. The balance of A Co. 3rd CB joined them. The 22nd put the Seabees through bootcamp in the jungles of western Samoa. In November 1943, the Regiment went to Maui, Hawaii and Wallis Island for amphibious warfare training before seeing combat in February 1944. After the Marshalls 3rd Battalion was returned to Naval Construction Battalion 3 and was reformed with Marines.

=== Southern Solomon Islands, Guadalcanal ===
It was discovered on Guadalcanal that some 1800+ members of the 22nd Marines had been infected while they were training in Samoa in 1942 and 1943 with the slow manifesting tropical disease Filariasis, which causes Elephantiasis. The Marine regiment was replaced with 500 Marines and Navy corpsmen that were excess with the 3rd Marine Division and replacements from the United States. This greatly reduced the number of experienced Marines, corpsmen, and leaders within the regiment just prior to the Battle of Guam in July. For the invasion of the island of Guam, the 4th Marine Regiment, 22nd Marine Regiment, and the Army's 305th Infantry Regiment, formed the core of the 1st Provisional Marine Brigade which was reactivated on April 18, 1944, on Guadalcanal. Colonel Walker was replaced with regiment's Executive officer, Colonel Merlin F. Schneider.

=== Marshall Islands: Battle of Eniwetok ===
(22nd Marines: Navy Unit Commendation, February 17 to 22, 1944) On February 18, 1944, the 22nd Marines under the command of Colonel John T. Walker, participated in the Battle of Eniwetok, in the northwest area of the Marshall Islands, capturing the islands of Engebi in 6 hours, Eniwetok Atoll on February 21 with the 1st and 3rd Battalions of the 106th Infantry Regiment of the 27th Infantry Division, and Parry on February 22. The 22nd Marine proceeded to take Kwajalein and Roi-Namur from March 7 to April 5. This was the first Marine Corps unit to formally employ fire team tactics in combat. On April 6, the Marine regiment was sent to Guadalcanal for rest, replacements, and further training.

=== Mariana Islands: Battle of Guam ===
(1st Provisional Marine Brigade: Navy Unit Commendation, July 21 to August 10, 1944)

On July 21, 1944, the 1st Provisional Marine Brigade assaulted and landed south of the Orote Peninsula on Guam, the largest island of the Mariana Islands. The 3rd Marine Division landed north of the peninsula. The 1st Battalion, 22nd Marines landed on Beach Yellow 1 which was just north of the City of Agat, 2nd Battalion, 22nd Marines came ashore on Yellow 2, and the 3rd Battalion, 22nd Marines held in reserve landed on Yellow 1. In about 20 days of fighting the island was declared free of organized resistance. On August 23, the 4th and 22nd Marine Regiments sailed back to Guadalcanal.

=== Guadalcanal ===
The 1st Provisional Marine Brigade was disbanded in September 1944 on Guadalcanal. The 4th Marines, 22nd Marines, and the 1st Battalion, 29th Marines along with supporting units and the 2nd and 3rd Battalions, 29th Marines from the United States were joined in September to form the 6th Marine Division on Guadalcanal which was activated on September 25.

=== Ryukyu Islands (Japan): Battle of Okinawa ===
(6th Marine Division: Presidential Unit Citation, April 1 to June 21, 1945)

On April 1, 1945, during the invasion of Okinawa, the 22nd Marines landed on Green Beach where they secured the left flank of the landing force. Following the landing they pushed north with the rest of the 6th Marine Division and secured the northern portion of the island. On 13 April, the 2nd Battalion, 22nd Marines reached Hedo-Misaki at the northernmost tip of the island. They were eventually pulled down south and placed in the line to the right of the 1st Marine Division where they would eventually secure the city of Naha while taking very heavy casualties. On May 16, the 22nd Marines was ordered to capture Sugar Loaf Hill which was captured with the 29th Marines in two days. Commanding officer, Harold C. Roberts, was killed by Japanese sniper on the last day of attack on Sugar Loaf Hill. After the fighting on Okinawa on June 21, the 22nd Marines was moved to Guam to rest and refit.

=== Northern China ===
While recuperating on Guam, the war ended on September 2, 1945. The 22nd Marines received a warning order for it to prepare to move to China. The entire 6th Marine Division was sent to Northern China as elements of Operation Beleaguer. It was a two prong mission: one to accept the surrender of Japanese forces and two to repatriate those troops and other Japanese nationals back to Japan. The 22nd Marines landed in Qingdao on October 11, 1945, and were still there on March 26, 1946, when the 6th division was officially inactivated.

=== Reactivation & inactivation ===
The 22nd Marines was reactivated as School Demonstration Troops at Marine Corps Schools, Quantico, Virginia, on 1 September 1947. Among its duties was training new Marine Corps Officers at The Basic School, Quantico, VA. The regiment was fully inactivated on 17 October 1949. During this period, 22nd Marines were commanded by Colonels Joseph C. Burger and Henry W. Buse Jr.

== Medal of Honor recipients ==

Three Marines and one Navy corpsman who was assigned to the 22nd Marines were awarded the Medal of Honor:

- James L. Day

Posthumous

- Henry A. Courtney, Jr.
- Anthony Damato
- Fred F. Lester, USN

== Unit decorations & other awards ==
A unit citation or unit commendation are unit decorations bestowed upon an organization for the action cited. Members of the unit who participated in said actions are allowed to wear the appropriate unit award ribbon on their uniforms. Members of the 22nd Marine Regiment are entitled to the following service ribbons in the order of precedence:

Presidential Unit Citation
Navy Unit Commendation with gold 5/16 inch star (updated from one bronze service star)

China Service Medal
Asiatic-Pacific Campaign Medal with three service stars

World War II Victory Medal

== See also ==
- List of United States Marine Corps regiments
- Organization of the United States Marine Corps
