= Merlin F. Schneider =

United States Marine Corps general

Merlin Frederick Schneider
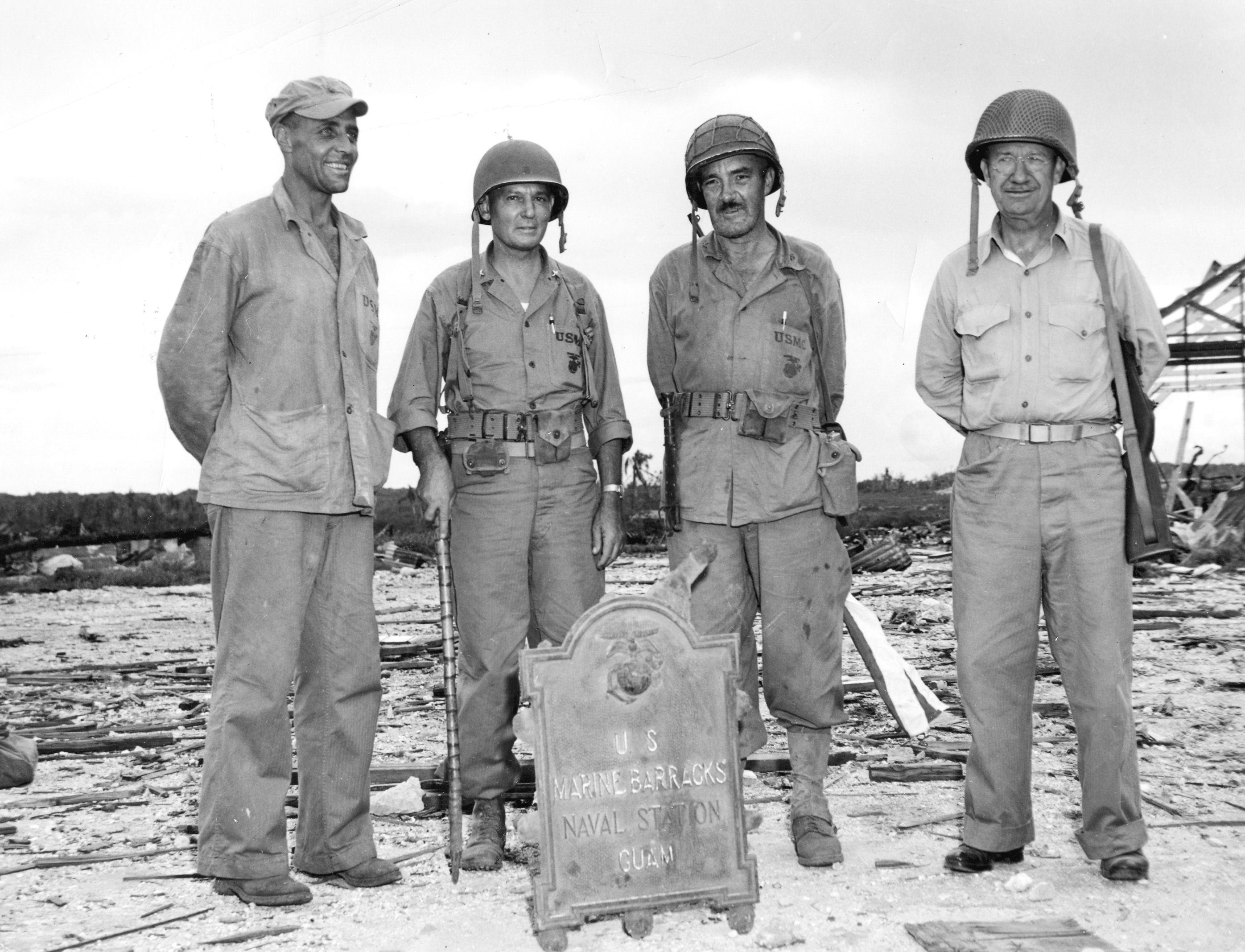
- Schneider (Second from right) following the recapture of Guam. The others are from left: Alan Shapley, Lemuel C. Shepherd and Holland Smith.
- Born: February 22, 1901; Clatskanie, Oregon, U.S.
- Died: November 15, 1970 (aged 69); Mesa, Arizona, U.S.
- Military career
- Allegiance: United States of America
- Branch: United States Marine Corps
- Service years: 1923–1948
- Rank: Brigadier general
- Nickname: "Red"
- Service number: 0-3859
- Commands: 22nd Marine Regiment
- Conflicts: Haitian Campaign; Yangtze Patrol; World War II: Battle of Eniwetok; Recapture of Guam; Battle of Okinawa
- Awards: Navy Cross; Bronze Star Medal

Merlin Frederick Schneider (February 22, 1901 – November 15, 1970) was a highly decorated officer in the United States Marine Corps with the rank of brigadier general. He is most noted as commanding officer of 22nd Marine Regiment during the Recapture of Guam in July 1944, for which he received the Navy Cross, the United States military's second-highest decoration awarded for valor in combat.

== Early career ==
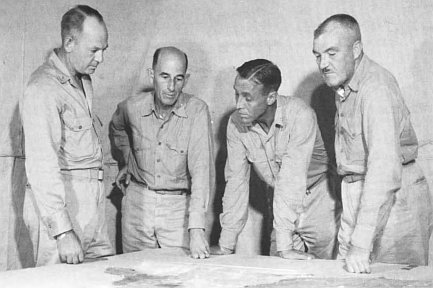
Lemuel C. Shepherd (left) speaks with members of his staff during a planning meeting prior to the Guam operation. Next to him is 1st Brigade Chief of Staff John T. Walker, Alan Shapley (4th Marines) and Merlin F. Schneider (22nd Marines).

Merlin F. Schneider was born on February 22, 1901, in Clatskanie, Oregon, and attended high school there. He accept appointment to the United States Naval Academy at Annapolis, Maryland, and graduated on June 7, 1923. During his time at the academy, he was active in football team and also served as chief petty officer of 4th Midshipman Battalion.

Many of his classmates became general officers later: Arleigh Burke, Harry D. Felt, Merrill B. Twining, Charles F. Coe, George F. Good Jr., John B. Moss, Frederick Moosbrugger, Stanhope C. Ring, Thomas B. Williamson, William D. Anderson, Murr E. Arnold, John G. Crommelin, Paul F. Dugan, William H. Hamilton, Francis M. Hughes, Joseph L. Kane, William G. Manley, Henry G. Moran, Richard M. Oliver, Edwin R. Peck, John V. Peterson, William T. Rassieur, William J. Scheyer, Francis E. Shoup Jr., Curtis S. Smiley, Frederick C. Stelter Jr., Frank D. Weir, Ralph W.D. Woods, Howard L. Young, Richard M. Cutts Jr., Samuel G. Fuqua, Ira L. Kimes, Frank H. Lamson-Scribner or Henry A. Schade.

Following the graduation, Schneider was commissioned second lieutenant in the Marine Corps and ordered to the Basic School at Philadelphia Navy Yard for further officers education. He completed the school one year later and was stationed at Marine Corps Base Quantico, Virginia, until late 1926, when he was ordered for his first expeditionary duty.

Schneider was attached to the First Marine Brigade under Brigadier General John Twiggs Myers and sailed for Haiti in order to support government forces against the Cacos rebels. He spent two years in the Caribbean and returned to the United States in 1928. After two-year assignment at Marine Barracks Parris Island, South Carolina, Schneider was ordered to China with 4th Marine Regiment in 1930 and served for next three years with American Legation in Peking and Shanghai.

In summer of 1933, he was ordered back to the States and assumed duties at Marine Corps Institute in New York, before he was transferred to Washington, D.C., for duty at Headquarters Marine Corps.

Schneider, who was already promoted to the rank of captain, was appointed commanding officer of the Marine detachment aboard the battleship USS New Mexico in 1938 and took part in the patrol cruises off coast of Hawaii.

== World War II ==
In 1940, Schneider was attached to the staff of Fleet Marine Force under the command of Major General William P. Upshur and participated in the Caribbean exercise. He was promoted to the rank of major during his service in this capacity.

When the 22nd Marine Regiment was formed at the beginning of June 1942 at Camp Elliott, Schneider was appointed commanding officer of the 3rd Battalion and sailed for Pacific area on June 18. He was stationed at Tutuila, American Samoa and took part in the garrison duty until May 1943, when the regiment was transferred to Wallis Island for island defense and small unit training. Schneider was promoted to the rank lieutenant colonel and appointed executive officer under Colonel John T. Walker.

He served in that capacity during the Eniwetok operation in the Marshall Islands at the end of February 1944 and following the promotion to the rank of colonel during the next month, he was appointed commanding officer of 22nd Marines. Schneider led his regiment during the recapture of Guam in the Marianas in July 1944 and distinguished himself during that operation. He was decorated with the Navy Cross, the United States military's second-highest decoration awarded for valor in combat.

His official Navy Cross citation reads:

The President of the United States of America takes pleasure in presenting the Navy Cross to Colonel Merlin Frederick Schneider (MCSN: 0-3859), United States Marine Corps, for extraordinary heroism as Commanding Officer of the Twenty-Second Marines (Reinforced), First Provisional Marine Brigade, during operations against enemy Japanese forces on Guam, Marianas Islands, from 21 July to 10 August 1944. Courageously leading his regiment in an assault landing against strong Japanese shore defenses, Colonel Schneider overran the enemy beach fortifications and aggressively led his forces through the town beyond, despite fanatical hostile resistance. Quickly consolidating his forces, he directed the assault of his regiment over difficult terrain and against cleverly concealed and well-defended enemy strong points to effect the capture of an important peninsula and vital harbor areas. Constantly under enemy observation, he repeatedly exposed himself to hostile fire in order to dispose his troops and direct their fire more effectively. Participating in the final offensive, he skillfully directed his regiment in the elimination of the last Japanese resistance on the island. By his frequent demonstrations of personal courage, forceful and vigorous leadership and excellent tactical handling of his command, Colonel Schneider contributed materially to the successful accomplishment of an extremely difficult mission. His gallant fighting spirit was in keeping with the highest traditions of the United States Naval Service.

Upon the formation of 6th Marine Division under Major General Lemuel C. Shepherd Jr. at the beginning of September 1944, Twenty Second Marines were attached to that division and took part in the eight-month training on Guadalcanal.

Following that period, Schneider led his regiment to Okinawa in April 1945 and took part in the landing on Green Beach. He led his regiment during the fierce fighting and participated in the capturing of northern portion of the island. However Schneider became overcautious and general Shepherd pointed several times on slow advance of 22nd Marine Regiment and criticized that Schneider stayed mostly on the regimental command post and not on the frontlines with his battalions.

Schneider was relieved without prejudice on May 16, 1945, and succeeded by Colonel Harold C. Roberts from the Divisional staff. General Shepherd thought, that Schneider who served in the Pacific area nonstop since June 1942 need rest. He decorated Schneider with Bronze Star Medal with Combat "V" and ordered back to the United States.

== Later life ==
Following a vacation with his family, Schneider returned to service and remained on active duty until 1948. He subsequently retired after 25 years of active service and was advanced to the rank of brigadier general on the retired list for having been specially commended in combat.

He settled in Mesa, Arizona together with his wife Catherine and died there on November 15, 1970. Both of their sons attended United States Naval Academy, and Richard Dana Schneider was killed in action in Korea in 1952. Their second son, Merlin Jr., was badly wounded during the recapture of Seoul in September 1951 and resigned from the service.

== Decorations ==
Here is the ribbon bar of Brigadier General Merlin F. Schneider:

1st Row	Navy Cross		
2nd Row	Bronze Star Medal with Combat "V"	Navy Presidential Unit Citation	Navy Unit Commendation with one star
3rd Row	Marine Corps Expeditionary Medal	Yangtze Service Medal	American Defense Service Medal
4th Row	American Campaign Medal	Asiatic-Pacific Campaign Medal with three stars	World War II Victory Medal
