= Lemuel C. Shepherd Jr. =

United States Marine Corps general (1896–1990)

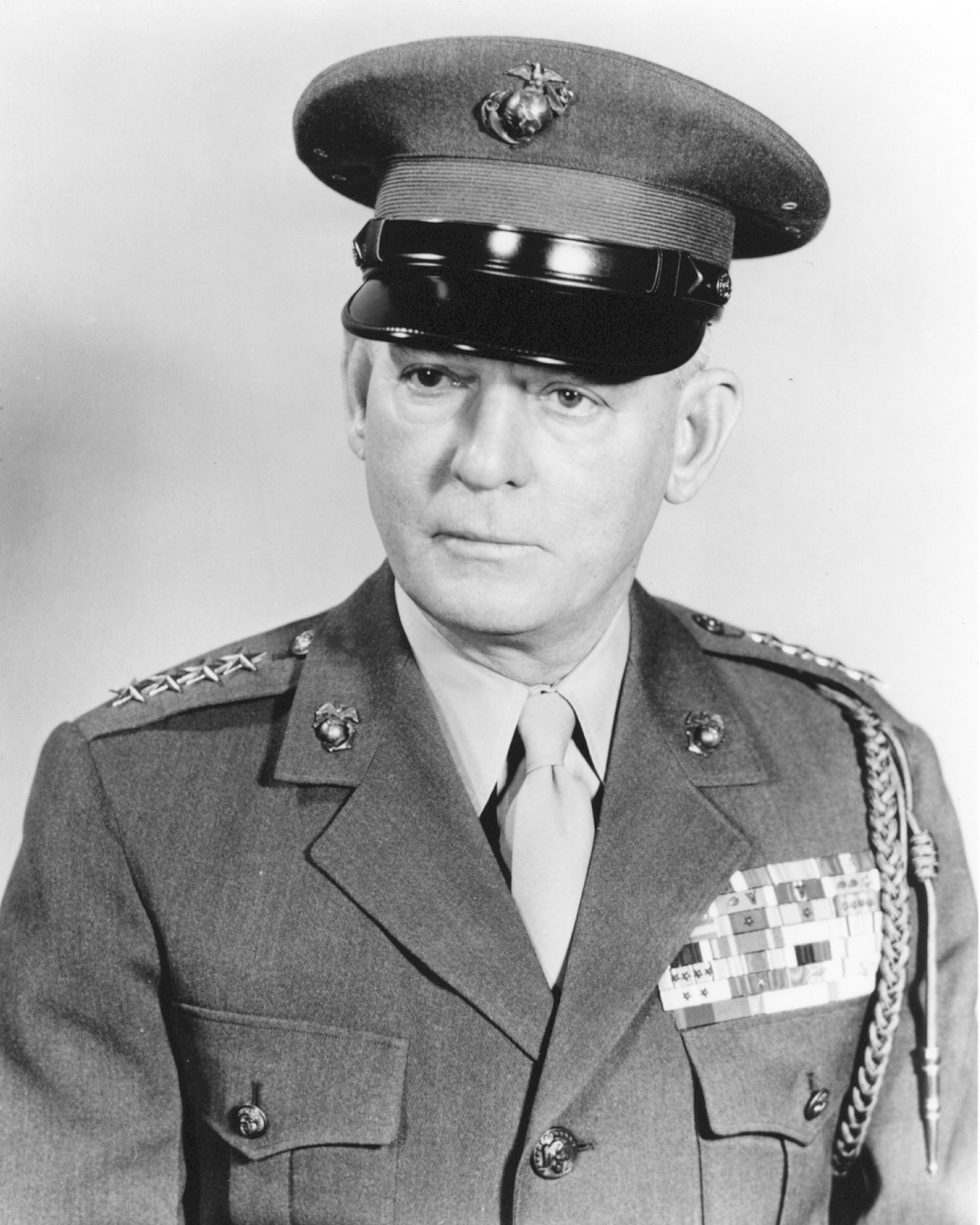
- General Lemuel C. Shepherd Jr.
- Born: February 10, 1896; Norfolk, Virginia, United States
- Died: August 6, 1990 (aged 94); San Diego, California, United States
- Burial place: Arlington National Cemetery, Virginia, United States
- Military career
- Allegiance: United States
- Branch: United States Marine Corps
- Service years: 1917–1959
- Rank: General
- Nickname: "Lem"
- Commands: Commandant of the Marine Corps; Assistant Commandant of the Marine Corps; Marine Corps Schools; 6th Marine Division; 1st Provisional Marine Brigade; 9th Marine Regiment; 2nd Battalion, 5th Marines
- Conflicts: World War I; Battle of Belleau Wood; Occupation of the Rhineland; Banana Wars; Haiti intervention; World War II; Guadalcanal campaign; New Britain campaign; Battle of Guam; Battle of Okinawa; Chinese Civil War; Operation Beleaguer; Korean War; Battle of Inchon; Battle of Chosin Reservoir
- Awards: Navy Cross; Distinguished Service Cross; Navy Distinguished Service Medal (3); Silver Star (3); Legion of Merit (2) w/ Combat "V"; Bronze Star Medal w/ Combat "V"; Purple Heart (4)
- Other work: Inter American Defense Board, Chair

Lemuel Cornick Shepherd Jr. (February 10, 1896 – August 6, 1990) was a General in the United States Marine Corps, 20th Commandant of the Marine Corps, Navy Cross recipient, veteran of World War I, World War II, and the Korean War.

As Commandant, he secured a place on the Joint Chiefs of Staff, gaining parity for the Marine Corps with the other military services.

== Early life and education ==
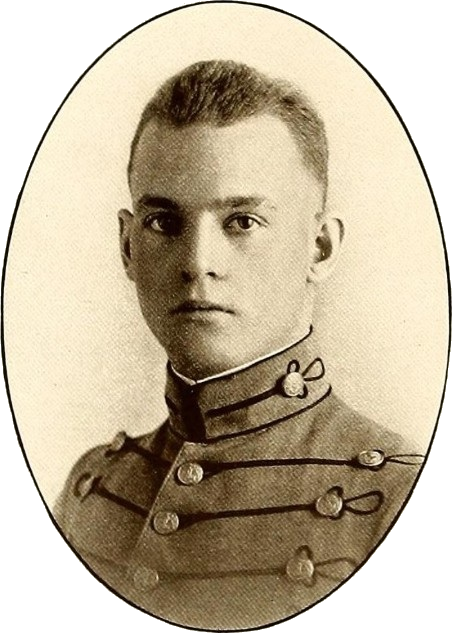
Shepherd as a VMI cadet circa 1917

Lemuel Cornick Shepherd Jr. was born February 10, 1896, in Norfolk, Virginia. A grandfather of his served with the Confederacy in the 15th Virginia Cavalry during the American Civil War, along with a great uncle, Lem, who was killed just prior to the Battle of Chancellorsville and for whom Shepherd was named. He entered the Virginia Military Institute in 1913 and graduated in early 1917 with a degree in civil engineering a few months before the rest of the Class of June 1917 so he could serve in the Marine Corps during World War I. While at VMI, Shepherd became a member of the Beta Commission of Kappa Alpha Order. He was commissioned a second lieutenant in the Marine Corps on April 11, 1917, five days after the American entry into World War I, and reported for active duty at the Marine Barracks, Port Royal, South Carolina, on May 19, 1917.

== World War I ==
Less than a month after reporting for duty, Shepherd sailed for France on June 17, 1917, as a member of the 5th Marine Regiment with the first elements of the American Expeditionary Forces (Army and Marine Corps troops), and arrived at Saint-Nazaire in western France on June 27. The 5th Marines became part of the 4th Marine Brigade, 2nd Division (2nd Infantry Division), when the division was organized on October 26 in France. The 2nd Division was placed under the command of Marine Corps Brigadier General Charles A. Doyen, who had been the 5th Marines commander. The 2nd Division trained with French Army veterans the winter of 1917–18.

Shepherd served in defensive sectors in the vicinity of Verdun. When the American Expeditionary Forces (AEF) was committed to combat in the spring of 1918 to halt a German advance towards Paris, he participated in the Aisne-Marne offensive (Château-Thierry) where he was twice wounded in action at Belleau Wood during the fighting there in June 1918. On July 28, 1918, Marine Corps Major General John A. Lejeune (Marine Corps Base Camp Lejeune, named 1942) assumed command of the 2nd Division. He returned to the front in August, rejoining the 5th Marines, and saw action in the St. Mihiel and Meuse-Argonne offensives (Champagne) where he was wounded for the third time, shot through the neck by a machine gun.

For his gallantry in action at Belleau Wood, Lieutenant Shepherd was awarded the Army Distinguished Service Cross and the Navy Cross, the French Croix de guerre, and was cited twice in the general orders of the 2nd Infantry Division, American Expeditionary Forces. He also received the Montenegrin Silver Medal for Bravery.

After duty with the Army of Occupation in Germany, Captain Shepherd sailed for home in July 1919. In September 1919, he returned to France. His assignment was to prepare relief maps showing the battlefields over which the 4th Marine Brigade (5th and 6th Marines and 6th Machine Gun Battalion), 2nd Infantry Division, had fought.

== Between the wars ==
Shepherd returned to the States in December 1920, and was assigned as White House aide and aide-de-camp to the commandant of the Marine Corps, Major General John A. Lejeune.

In July 1922, he took command of a selected company of Marines at the Brazil's Centennial Exposition in Rio de Janeiro.

In June 1923, Shepherd was ordered to sea duty as commanding officer of the Marine Detachment on the USS Idaho (BB-42). This tour was followed by duty at the Marine Barracks, Norfolk, where he commanded the Sea School. In April 1927, Shepherd sailed for expeditionary duty in China, where he served in the 3rd Marine Brigade in Tientsin and Shanghai.

Shepherd returned to the United States in 1929 and attended the Field Officers' Course, Marine Corps Schools. After graduation Captain Shepherd was assigned overseas again, this time on detached duty with the Garde d'Haïti, serving for four years as a district and department commander in the United States occupation of Haiti. Following the withdrawal of Marines from Haiti in 1934, Shepherd was detailed to the Marine Barracks, Washington, D.C., as executive officer and as registrar of the Marine Corps Institute.

Following graduation in May 1937 from the Naval War College at Newport, Rhode Island, Shepherd commanded the 2nd Battalion, 5th Marine Regiment, part of the newly formed Fleet Marine Force (FMF), Atlantic, which was being extensively employed in the development of amphibious tactics and techniques.

In June 1939, Shepherd was ordered to the Staff of Marine Corps Schools, Quantico, Virginia, where he served during the next three years as director, Correspondence School; chief of the Tactical Section; officer in charge of the Candidates Class; and assistant commandant.

== World War II ==
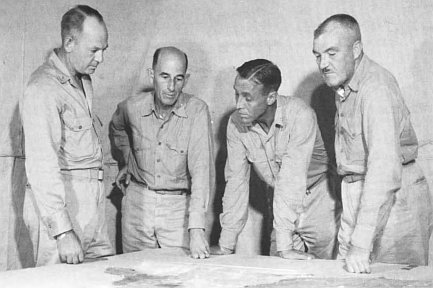
Brigadier General Shepherd (left), Commanding the 1st Provisional Marine Brigade and his principal officers view a relief map of Guam for the brigade's operation

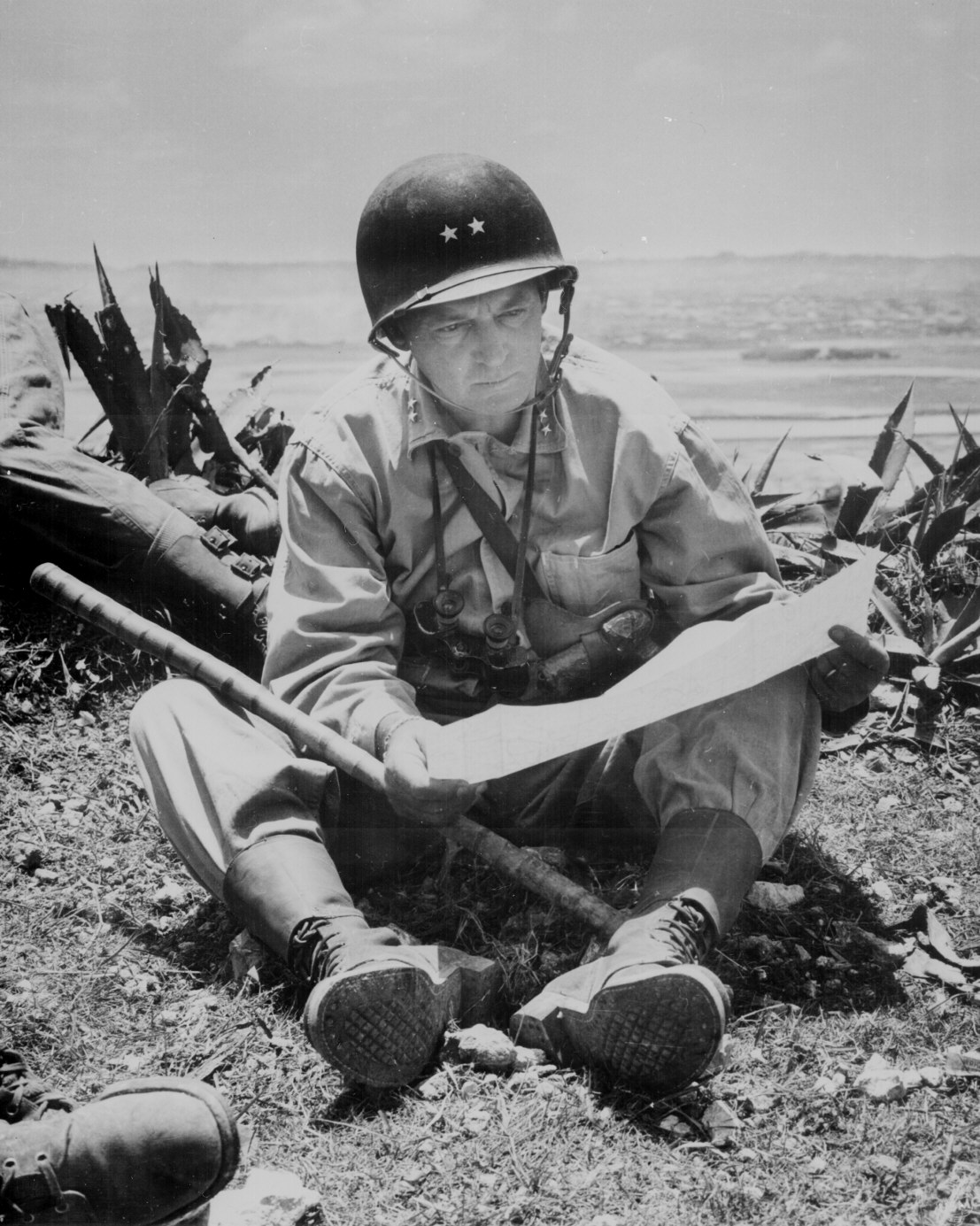
Major General Shepherd surveys a map after the Battle of Okinawa

In March 1942, four months after the United States entry into World War II, Colonel Shepherd took command of the 9th Marine Regiment. He organized, trained, and took the unit overseas as part of the 3rd Marine Division.

Upon promotion to brigadier general in July 1943, Shepherd served on Guadalcanal. Shepherd was assigned as assistant division commander of the 1st Marine Division. In this capacity, he participated in the Cape Gloucester operation on New Britain from December 1943 through March 1944, where he was awarded a Legion of Merit for exceptionally meritorious service in command of operations in the Borgen Bay area.

In May 1944, Shepherd assumed command of the 1st Provisional Marine Brigade and led them in the invasion and subsequent recapture of Guam during July and August 1944. For distinguished leadership in this operation, Shepherd received his first Distinguished Service Medal and was promoted to major general.

After organizing the 6th Marine Division from the brigade, Shepherd commanded it throughout the Battle of Okinawa where, for exceptionally meritorious service as commanding general of the 6th Marine Division in the assault and occupation of Okinawa (April 1 to June 21, 1945) he was awarded a Gold Star in lieu of a second Distinguished Service Medal. Subsequently, he took the division to Tsingtao, China. There, October 25, 1945, he received the surrender of the Japanese forces in this area for which he was awarded a second Legion of Merit.

== 1946–1956 ==
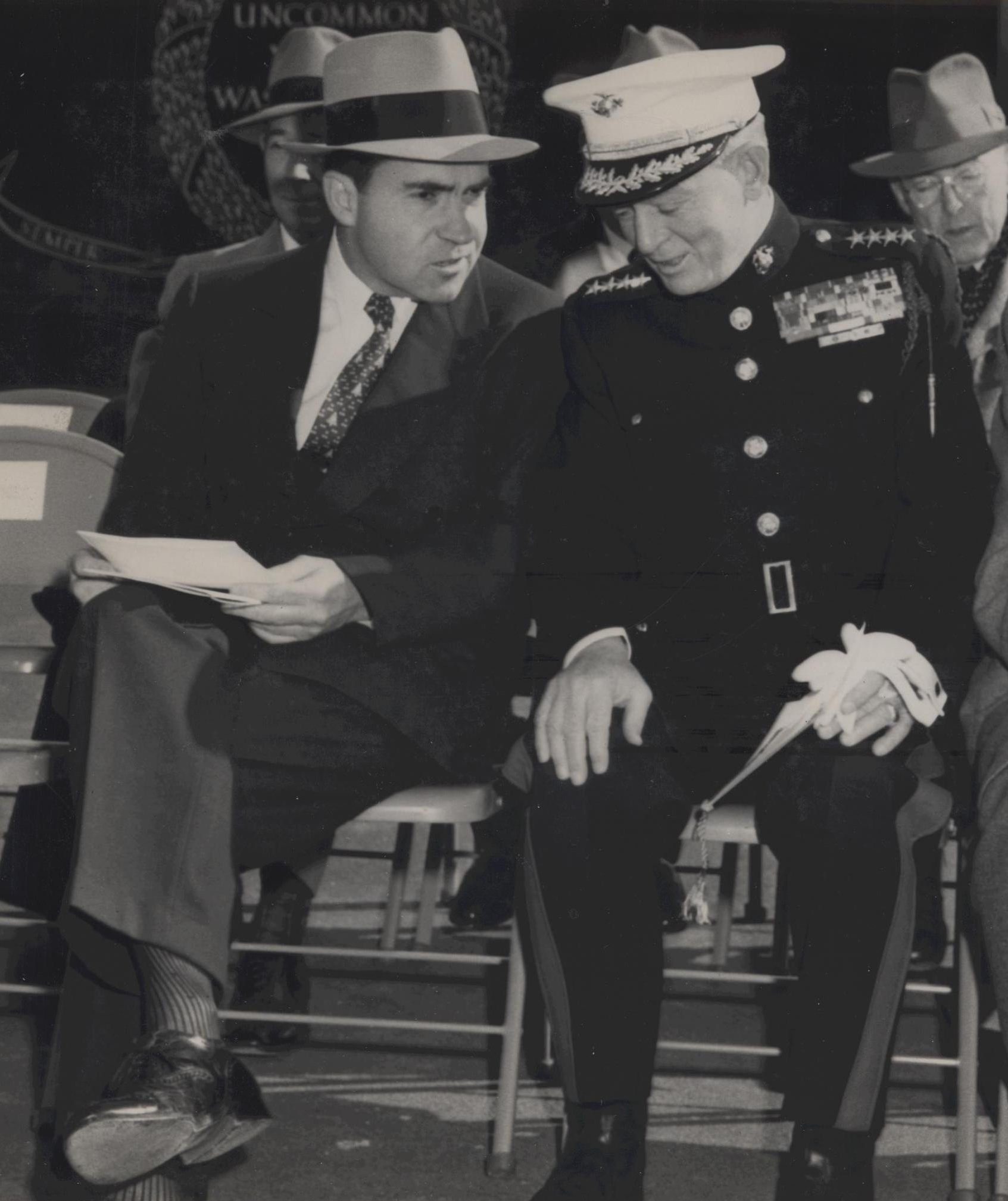
Shepherd with Richard Nixon, 1954

Several months later, Shepherd returned to the United States and in March 1946, organized the Troop Training Command, Amphibious Forces, Atlantic Fleet, at NAB Little Creek, Virginia.

On October 17, 1946, Shepherd assumed the post of Assistant Commandant of the Marine Corps. He remained at this post until April 1948, when he was assigned to Quantico where he served as commandant of the Marine Corps Schools until June 1950.

When the Korean War erupted, Shepherd was in command of the Fleet Marine Force (FMF), Pacific, with headquarters at Pearl Harbor. In this capacity, he played a major role in the amphibious assault at Inchon, earning a Silver Star, and in the evacuation of U.S. forces from Hungnam following their withdrawal from the Chosin Reservoir in North Korea in December 1950. In Korea he saw the usefulness and advantages of helicopters on the frontlines and was amongst those pushing for the increase in number of helicopters in the armed forces saying "No effort should be spared to get helicopters ... to the theater at once – and on a priority higher than any other weapon."

On January 1, 1952, President Harry S. Truman appointed Shepherd Commandant of the Marine Corps. During Shepherd's four years as commandant, he initiated a number of important policies that resulted in increased military proficiency for the Marine Corps, one of the first and widest reaching of which was the institution of a General Staff System. Shepherd presented the Marine Corps War Memorial to the American people at the dedication of the memorial on November 10, 1954, the 179th anniversary of the founding of the Marine Corps. He was the first commandant to become a member of the Joint Chiefs of Staff, and upon his retirement on January 1, 1956, he was awarded a third Distinguished Service Medal.

== 1956–1990 ==
Two months after his retirement, Shepherd was recalled to active duty and appointed chairman of the Inter-American Defense Board. During his three and a half years of service with this international organization, Shepherd, through his leadership and diplomacy, made substantial contributions towards plans for the defense of the continent. He also promoted military solidarity among the military forces of the republics of the Western Hemisphere. He relinquished his duties with the Inter-American Defense Board on September 15, 1959.

Shepherd died at age 94 from bone cancer at his home in La Jolla, California. He was buried with his wife, Virginia Driver (1898–1989) at Arlington National Cemetery.

== Awards and decorations ==
Shepherd's military awards include:

1st Row	Navy Cross		Army Distinguished Service Cross		French Fourragère
2nd Row	Navy Distinguished Service Medal w/ two 5/16" Gold Stars	Silver Star w/ two Oak Leaf Clusters	Legion of Merit w/ Combat "V" and one Oak Leaf Cluster	Bronze Star Medal w/ Combat "V"	French Fourragère
3rd Row	Purple Heart w/ two Oak Leaf Clusters and one 5/16" Gold Star	Navy Presidential Unit Citation w/ three 3/16" bronze stars	Navy Unit Commendation w/ one 3/16" bronze star	World War I Victory Medal w/ four 3/16" bronze stars	French Fourragère
4th Row	Army of Occupation of Germany Medal	Marine Corps Expeditionary Medal w/ one 3/16" bronze star	Yangtze Service Medal	China Service Medal	French Fourragère
5th Row	American Defense Service Medal	American Campaign Medal	Asiatic-Pacific Campaign Medal with four 3/16" bronze stars	World War II Victory Medal	French Fourragère
6th Row	Navy Occupation Service Medal	National Defense Service Medal	Korean Service Medal with two 3/16" bronze stars	French Croix de guerre with Gilt Star	French Fourragère
7th Row	Silver Medal of Bravery (Montenegrin) with crossed swords and palm	Haitian National Order of Honour and Merit	Haitian Distinguished Service Medal	Order of the Cloud and Banner; Second Grade	French Fourragère
8th row	Order of Military Merit, Taeguk Cordon Medal with gold star	Order of Naval Merit; Grand Officer Argentina	Naval Order of Merit; Grand Officer Brazil	White Grand Cross of Naval Merit; Spain	French Fourragère
9th row	Order of Abdon Calderon; First Class, Republic of Ecuador	Military Order of the Ayacucho; Grand Officer, Peru	Grand Cross, National Order of Merit of Paraguay	Order of the Aztec Eagle	French Fourragère
10th row	Medal of Military Merit; First Class (Mexico)	French Legion of Honor; Grade of Commander	Order of Military Merit; Grand Officer Brazil	Commander of the Order of the Crown (Belgium)	French Fourragère
11th row	National Order of Military Merit of Paraguay, Grade of Grand Officer	Republic of Korea Presidential Unit Citation	Inter-American Defense Board Medal with two 3/16" gold stars	United Nations Korea Medal	French Fourragère

Other awards and recognitions:

- Military Medal of the Army, First Class (Chile)
- Bronze plaque with Diploma Commemorative Especial (Brazil)
- Commendatory letter from the Joint Chiefs of Staff (dated 15 Sept. 1959).
- Marine Corps Historical Foundation's Distinguished Service Award "for numerous and substantial contributions to the history of the Marine Corps that span more than seventy years."

Military offices
Preceded by Clifton B. Cates	Commandant of the Marine Corps; 1952–1955	Succeeded by Randolph M. Pate
