= Victor Bleasdale =

United States Marine Corps general

Victor France Bleasdale
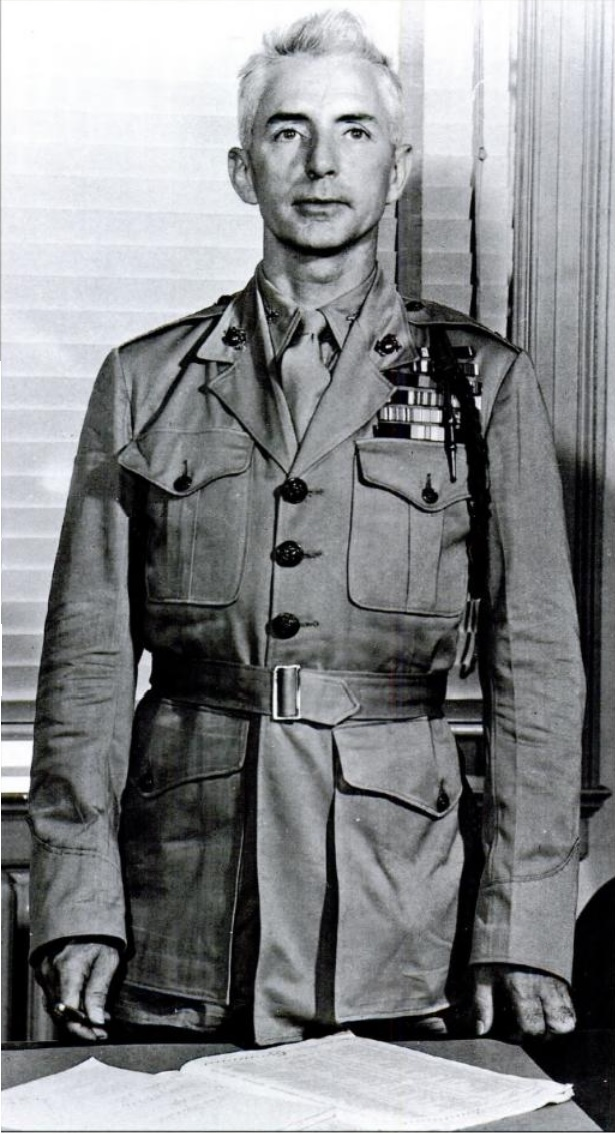
- Born: December 2, 1895; Norsewood, New Zealand
- Died: February 10, 1984 (aged 88); London, United Kingdom
- Military career
- Allegiance: United States
- Branch: United States Marine Corps
- Service years: 1915–1946
- Rank: Brigadier general
- Service number: 0–85
- Commands: 29th Marine Regiment
- Conflicts: Haitian Campaign World War I: Battle of Belleau Wood; Battle of Soissons; Battle of Saint-Mihiel; Battle of Blanc Mont Ridge; Nicaraguan Campaign: Battle of San Fernando; World War II: Guadalcanal Campaign; Battle of Okinawa
- Awards: Navy Cross (2); Distinguished Service Cross; Silver Star (2); Bronze Star Medal; Purple Heart

Victor France Bleasdale (December 2, 1895 – February 10, 1984) was a brigadier general in the United States Marine Corps. He was awarded the Navy Cross and Distinguished Service Cross for his actions during the Battle of Blanc Mont Ridge in World War I. Later he received a second Navy Cross for his service at the Battle of San Fernando during the Second Nicaraguan Campaign.

== Early military career ==
Bleasdale was born in Norsewood, New Zealand, but moved to the United States at an early age. He moved with his family to Janesville, Wisconsin, where he attended the local high school. At the age of 19, Victor enlisted in the Marine Corps at Milwaukee on May 15, 1915, and was posted to Norfolk, Virginia. There he underwent basic training and subsequently was sent with a Marine Expeditionary Force to Haiti. He participated in actions against hostile Cacos bandits at Le Trou and Fort Capois, Haiti.

Bleasdale returned to the United States in December 1916 and served briefly at the Philadelphia Navy Yard and then at the Naval Air Station Pensacola in Florida. During his enlisted service, Bleasdale rose to the rank of sergeant and was awarded the Marine Corps Good Conduct Medal.

== World War I ==
When World War I broke out, Bleasdale was sent with the American Expeditionary Force to Europe. He arrived in France in June 1917 and was assigned to several training schools. After completing school, he was commissioned a second lieutenant in the Marine Corps Reserve on May 29, 1918, and appointed machine gun platoon commander in the 6th Machine Gun Battalion, 2nd Division.

Bleasdale subsequently commanded his unit during the Battle of Belleau Wood or Battle of Soissons, where he was awarded the Silver Star Citation for gallantry in action. He was slightly wounded in the left hand during the Meuse-Argonne Offensive, but stayed with his unit. He was promoted to the rank of first lieutenant at that time.

During the Battle of Blanc Mont Ridge in October 1918, Bleasdale was awarded his second Silver Star Citation for gallantry in action. A few days later, he led his machine gun platoon under heavy enemy machine gun and artillery fire, trying to support an advancing infantry company. The advance of the infantry company was halted by the intensive fire of two Maxim machine guns. Bleasdale formed his machine gun section as regular infantry, and assaulted the machine gun position.

For repeated acts of extraordinary heroism, Bleasdale was awarded the Navy Cross and the Distinguished Service Cross. He was transferred to the regular Marine Corps and promoted to the rank of captain. He was also decorated with the French Croix de guerre 1914–1918 with palm and Fourragère by the government of France.

His younger brother, Redwald (1897–1991), also received the Distinguished Service Cross while serving as a private with the 30th Infantry Regiment. They were the first pair of brothers to receive the award.

With the end of the war, Bleasdale served with the occupation forces in Germany and returned to the United States in August 1919.

== Interwar period ==
Following his return to the United States, Bleasdale served with Marine units at Marine Corps Base Quantico or Naval Station Norfolk in Virginia before he was assigned to mail guard duty in St. Louis, Missouri in December 1921. He was transferred back to Quantico in March 1922 and few months later ordered for shore duty with the Second Marine Brigade to Santo Domingo, Dominican Republic.

After two years in the Dominican Republic, Bleasdale returned to Quantico in September 1924 and was stationed there until February 1927, when he was assigned to the Marine Expeditionary Force and sent to Nueva Segovia, Nicaragua. The main task of the Marine Expeditionary Force was to assist the Guardia Nacional de Nicaragua in suppressing the rebellion led by Augusto César Sandino.

On July 25, 1927, Bleasdale was on patrol with a combined unit of Marines and Nicaraguan Guardsmen led by Major Oliver Floyd. When they reached the town of San Fernando with no resistance, Bleasdale, accompanied only by his orderly private Rafel Toro, was ordered to question a local elderly man. When they were alone on the large open plaza, Sandinistas ambushed them and Toro was mortally wounded. Bleasdale returned fire and was able to hold them back until reinforcements arrived. For his extraordinary heroism in the face of the enemy, Bleasdale was awarded his second Navy Cross.

Bleasdale was subsequently appointed intelligence and ordnance officer with the staff of Jefe Director, Brigadier General Elias R. Beadle. Bleasdale remained in Nicaragua until June 1929, when he was ordered to Quantico to attend a one-year company course. He then returned to Nicaragua and after six months of service there was transferred back to Quantico, where he was appointed an instructor in November 1930.

He left Quantico again in June 1933 to be assigned to the Marine Detachment aboard the battleship USS Oklahoma. Bleasdale spent a year on that ship, before he was transferred again to Quantico. In June 1936, he was assigned to the Marine Corps Headquarters in Washington, D.C., and one year later, he was appointed an inspector-instructor of the 13th Marine Reserve Battalion located in Los Angeles, California.

After service at Puget Sound Naval Shipyard and the Marine Corps base in San Diego, California, Bleasdale was appointed executive officer of the Marine Defense Force in Dutch Harbor, Alaska. He stayed in Alaska until May 1941.

== World War II ==
At the time of the attack on Pearl Harbor, Bleasdale served as chief of staff of the Second Marine Brigade under the command of Major General Clayton B. Vogel. He sailed with the division to the American Samoa in the South Pacific and participated in the Guadalcanal Campaign. For his service there, he was awarded the Bronze Star Medal.

In May 1943, he was transferred to the United States to become chief of staff of the training center at Camp Lejeune, North Carolina. He oversaw the forming and training of the 29th Marine Regiment, which was formed as a part of the 6th Marine Division, and subsequently assumed command of the regiment.

The 29th Marines were sent overseas and participated in the Battle of Okinawa under Bleasdale's command. He was relieved of command on April 11, 1945, and succeeded by William J. Whaling, a decorated World War I veteran, who later was awarded the Navy Cross on Okinawa. Bleasdale was subsequently transferred to the general staff of the III Amphibious Corps, where he Commanded Corps reserve troops on Okinawa.

For his service as a regimental commander of the 29th Marines, Bleasdale received a Navy Presidential Unit Citation.

In August 1945, Bleasdale was transferred to Guam, where he was appointed Deputy Chief of Military Government and Deputy Commanding Officer of the U.S. Naval Military Government Unit under Major General Henry Louis Larsen. He served in that capacity until June 1946, when he returned to San Diego to retire. He was advanced to the rank of brigadier general on the retired list for having been specially commended in combat on December 1, 1946.

== Postwar life ==
After retiring from the Marine Corps, Bleasdale served as a technical advisor to President Rafael Trujillo in matters relating to the Armed Forces of the Dominican Republic. He was also active in the Marine Corps Historical Foundation, where he received a Certificate of Appreciation by then-Commandant Robert H. Barrow for his contributions to the Oral History Program.

Bleasdale later settled in England, where he resided in London. Bleasdale died there on February 10, 1984.

== Decorations ==

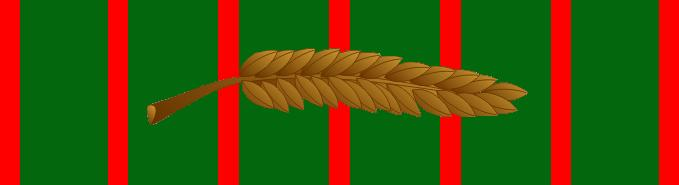

1st Row	Navy Cross with Gold Star		Distinguished Service Cross	Silver Star with Gold Star	French Fourragère
2nd Row	Bronze Star Medal	Purple Heart	Navy Presidential Unit Citation	Marine Corps Good Conduct Medal	French Fourragère
3rd Row	Marine Corps Expeditionary Medal with one service star	Haitian Campaign Medal	World War I Victory Medal with five battle clasps	Army of Occupation of Germany Medal	French Fourragère
4th Row	Nicaraguan Campaign Medal (1933)	American Defense Service Medal with base clasp	American Campaign Medal	Asiatic-Pacific Campaign Medal with two service stars	French Fourragère
5th Row	World War II Victory Medal	French Croix de guerre 1914–1918 with palm	Nicaraguan Presidential Order of Merit with gold star	Nicaraguan Medal of Distinction and Diploma	French Fourragère

== Citations ==
=== Distinguished Service Cross citation ===
The President of the United States of America, authorized by Act of Congress, July 9, 1918, takes pleasure in presenting the Distinguished Service Cross to First Lieutenant Victor F. Bleasdale (MCSN: 0–85), United States Marine Corps, for repeated acts of extraordinary heroism while serving with the Sixth Machine-Gun Battalion, Sixth Regiment (Marines), 2d Division, A.E.F., in action near Blanc Mont, France, 8 October 1918. On several occasions, regardless of his personal safety, First Lieutenant Bleasdale led his machine-gun platoon through heavy machine-gun and artillery fire. When the Infantry company which he was supporting was halted by the fire of two enemy Maxims, Lieutenant Bleasdale formed his platoon as infantry, assaulted and captured both the enemy guns.

=== First Navy Cross citation ===
The President of the United States of America takes pleasure in presenting the Navy Cross to First Lieutenant Victor F. Bleasdale (MCSN: 0–85), United States Marine Corps, for repeated acts of extraordinary heroism while serving with the 6th Machine-Gun Battalion, 6th Regiment (Marines), 2d Division, A.E.F. in action near Blanc Mont, France, 8 October 1918. On several occasions, regardless of his personal safety, First Lieutenant Bleasdale led his machine-gun platoon through heavy machine-gun and artillery fire. When the Infantry company which he was supporting was halted by the fire of two enemy Maxims, Lieutenant Bleasdale formed his platoon as infantry, assaulted and captured both the enemy guns.

=== Second Navy Cross citation ===
The President of the United States of America takes pleasure in presenting a Gold Star in lieu of a Second Award of the Navy Cross to Captain Victor F. Bleasdale (MCSN: 0–85), United States Marine Corps, for extraordinary heroism, coolness and excellent judgment while performing advance guard duty on 25 July 1927, in an important expedition into Nueva Segovia, Nicaragua, during the progress of an insurrection in that country. As the expedition approached San Fernando, Captain Bleasdale accompanied only by his orderly rode ahead into the town and on being attacked, fearlessly proceeded against tremendous odds and returning the fire held the enemy in check until the arrival of reinforcements. Largely through his prompt, courageous and effective action, serious casualties to the personnel and train of the expedition were averted.
