= William J. Whaling =

U.S. Marine Corps Major General

William John Whaling
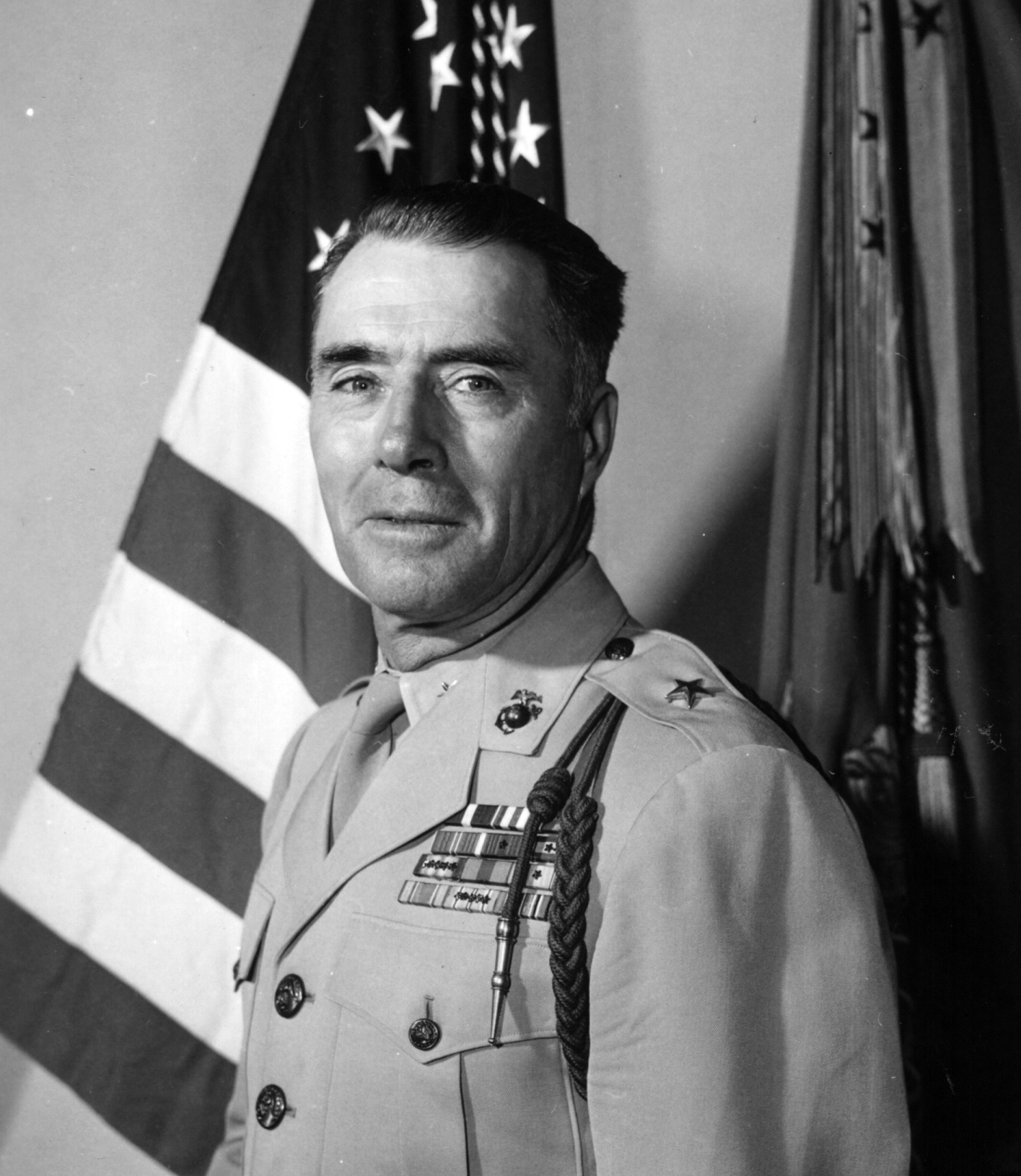
- Whaling as Brigadier General, USMC
- Born: February 26, 1894; St. Cloud, Minnesota, US
- Died: November 20, 1989 (aged 95); Lyons, New Jersey, US
- Burial place: Arlington National Cemetery
- Military career
- Allegiance: United States of America
- Branch: United States Marine Corps
- Service years: 1917–1954
- Rank: Major general
- Nickname: "Wild Bill"
- Service number: 0-1049
- Commands: MCRD San Diego; ADC of 1st Marine Division; 1st Marine Regiment; 29th Marine Regiment
- Conflicts: World War I; Battle of Belleau Wood; Battle of Saint-Mihiel; Meuse-Argonne Offensive; Banana Wars; Nicaraguan Campaign; Chinese Civil War; Yangtze Patrol; World War II; Battle of Guadalcanal; Battle of Matanikau; Operation Cartwheel; Battle of Cape Gloucester; Battle of Okinawa; Chinese Civil War; Operation Beleaguer; Korean War; Battle of the Punchbowl
- Awards: Navy Cross; Distinguished Service Medal; Silver Star; Legion of Merit (2); Bronze Star Medal; Air Medal; Purple Heart (2)

William John Whaling (February 26, 1894 – November 20, 1989) was a highly decorated Major general in the United States Marine Corps and an expert in jungle warfare during the Pacific War. He also competed as a sport shooter in the 1924 Summer Olympics, where he finished in 12th place in the 25 m rapid fire pistol competition.

He began his Marine Corps career as an Enlisted Man and received field commission during World War I. Whaling remained in the Marine Corps and commanded a battalion at Guadalcanal and regiment at Cape Gloucester and Okinawa, where he earned the Navy Cross for gallantry in action. During the Korean War, he served as assistant division commander, 1st Marine Division and later as commanding general, Marine Corps Recruit Depot San Diego.

== Early career ==
William J. Whaling was born on February 26, 1894, in St. Cloud, Minnesota, as the son of Canadian immigrants. Following the United States entry into World War I, he enlisted in the Marine Corps in May 1917. Whaling completed boot camp at Parris Island and then joined the newly organized 1st Battalion, 6th Marines. Following several months of intensive training, he embarked for France, where he spent the next several months with more training and the unloading of the ships.

The 6th Marine Regiment was ordered to the trenches in the Verdun sector in March 1918 and Whaling then took part in the Battle of Belleau Wood in June that year, where he was gassed. He was hospitalized for the next two months and was commissioned as a second lieutenant in August 1918. Whaling was subsequently attached to the headquarters of the 6th Marine Regiment under Colonel Harry Lee and participated in the Battle of Saint-Mihiel in September 1918. He distinguished himself during combat near Thiaucourt and received a Silver Star citation for gallantry in action.

Upon the Armistice, Whaling participated in the Occupation of the Rhineland, Germany, where he befriended future general Gerald C. Thomas during his service in the 75th Company. While in Germany, he also served as coach of 6th Marine Regiment Baseball Team and became involved in the 1919 American Expeditionary Forces Rifle and Pistol Matches, where he won a gold medal for Pistol Match. He returned to the United States in June 1919 and was transferred to the regular Marine Corps with his rank of second lieutenant.

== Interwar service ==
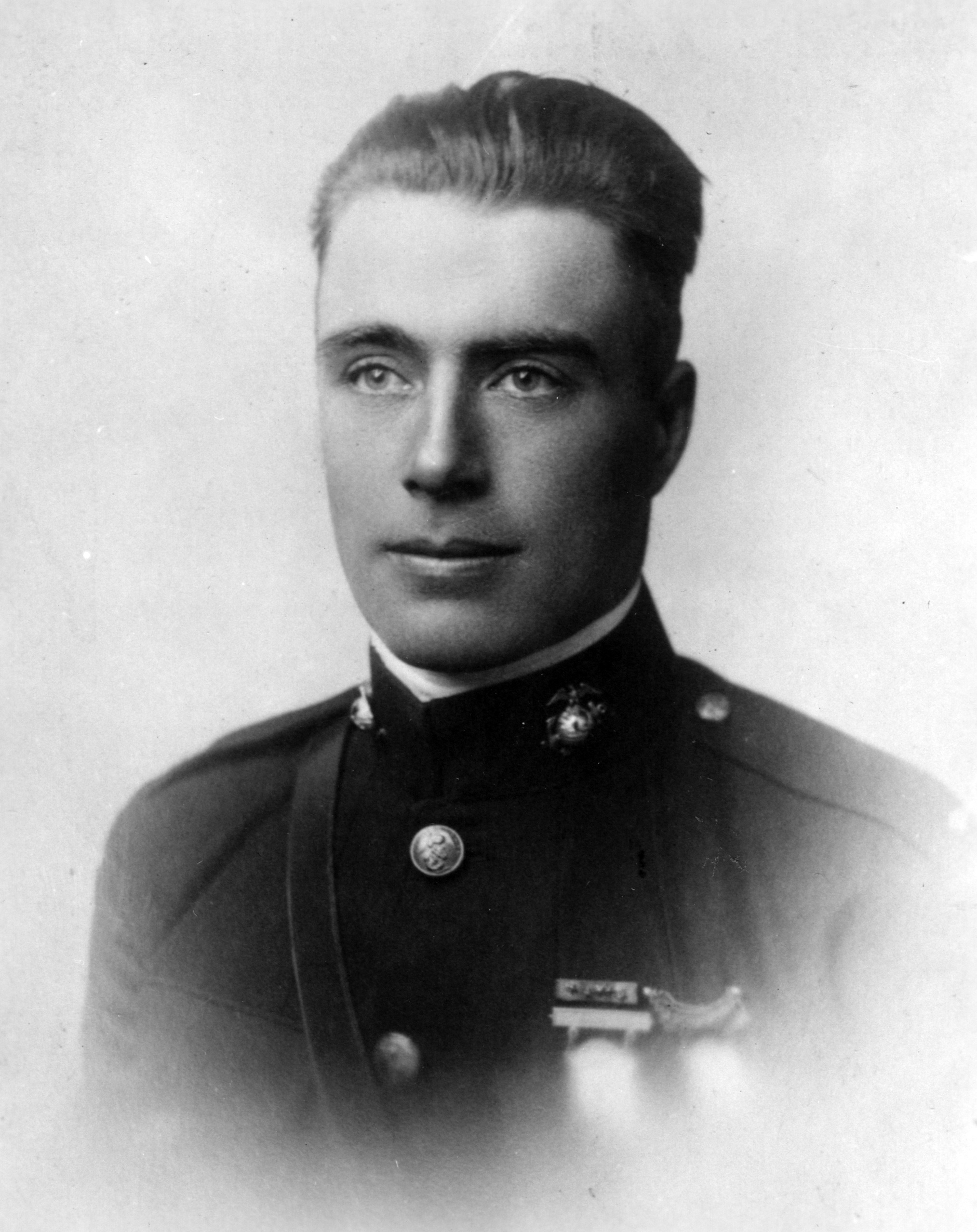
Whaling as 1st lieutenant in March 1922

Following his return stateside, Whaling was attached to the Marine barracks at Portsmouth Naval Shipyard, Maine and during his service, he became a member of the National Pistol Team and was promoted to first lieutenant on June 4, 1920. He was transferred to the Regular Marine Corps on March 31, 1921, and attached to the Marine detachment aboard the cruiser USS Tacoma. Whaling served four months at the sea and participated in the patrol cruises to the Latin America and the Caribbean during the series of disorders and coups.

In April 1922, he was ordered to Marine Barracks, Quantico, Virginia, where he served again the National Pistol Team. Whaling was attached to the Marine detachment aboard the battleship USS Maryland in December that year and participated in the fleet exercises off the Panama Canal Zone during the next year. He served aboard the Maryland until June 1923, when he was ordered to the Marine Barracks, Parris Island, South Carolina, where he was active again in the Marine Corps Pistol and Rifle Team.

He quickly gained the reputation of a great shooter and thus represented the United States on the 1924 Summer Olympics in Paris, France, where he finished in 12th place in the 25 m rapid fire pistol competition.

Whaling was transferred to the West Coast in October 1924 and attached to the headquarters, Department of the Pacific in San Francisco under Major General Wendell C. Neville. He did not remain there for long and in December that year, he embarked for expeditionary duty in China. Whaling was attached to the Marine detachment with the American Legation in Peking and served there until December 1926.

Following his return stateside, Whaling was ordered to the Marine Barracks, Quantico, Virginia, where he entered the Base Defense Weapons Course at the local Marine Corps Schools. He graduated in June 1927 and remained there until the following March, when he was ordered to Nicaragua as a member of 2nd Brigade of Marines. Whaling participated in the numerous jungle patrols against bandits under Augusto César Sandino and returned to the United States in May 1929 for new assignment.

As an experienced shooter, Whaling was appointed commanding officer of the Marine Corps Rifle and Pistol Team at Quantico and his team, which he also captained. He was promoted to the rank of captain on December 1, 1930, and ordered to Haiti, where he was attached as an instructor to the Garde d'Haïti, Haitian Constabulary. Whaling trained constabulary personnel for combat against Cacos bandits for next four years and was decorated with the Haitian National Order of Honour and Merit and the Haitian Distinguished Service Medal.

Following his return to the United States in August 1934, Whaling was stationed at the Marine barracks at Philadelphia Navy Yard and served in this assignment until August 1938, when he entered the Senior Course at the Amphibious Warfare School at Quantico. While in Philadelphia, he was promoted to major on August 1, 1936.

He graduated in May 1939 and assumed command of the Marine Corps Pistol Team there. Whaling captained the team during the shooting competitions at Camp Perry, Ohio, in September 1939 and distinguished himself. During his tenure, the team won National Rifle Association Members' Match, National Pistol Match, Marine Corps Cup Match, Wimbledon Cup Match and the Herrick Trophy Team Match.

Whaling was commended by the Commandant of the Marine Corps, Thomas Holcomb and also received a letter of commendation by the Assistant Secretary of War, Louis A. Johnson for his remarkable leadership and coaching ability in marksmanship.

Besides his duties with the rifle and pistol team, he was attached to the 5th Marine Regiment, which was ordered as the part of 1st Marine Brigade for amphibious exercise to Culebra, Puerto Rico in early 1940. Whaling served as executive officer of 2nd Battalion under Lieutenant Colonel Robert C. Kilmartin Jr. and held temporary command of the battalion during Kilmartin's absence in August and September 1940.

The 1st Marine Brigade was stationed at Guantanamo Bay, Cuba, and ultimately redesignated 1st Marine Division under Major General Holland Smith in February 1941. Whaling was promoted to lieutenant colonel on March 1, 1941, and assumed command of the 2nd Battalion in May 1941. Due to the escalating situation in Europe during the ongoing combat operations, he led his regiment during the intensive training in Cuba until the end of September, when he was ordered as an observer to Hawaii.

== World War II ==
Whaling was attached to the Marine barracks at Pearl Harbor Navy Yard under Colonel Gilder D. Jackson Jr. and was present there at the time of Japanese attack on Pearl Harbor in the morning on December 7 that year. Whaling was sleeping at his quarters when he was awakened by bombs blasts. He rushed to the parade ground, where he witnessed tens of incoming Japanese fighters and bombers attacking Hickam Field and Navy Yard.

Whaling was subsequently summoned to Washington, D.C., by Commandant Thomas Holcomb and after he reported the events at Pearl Harbor, he was called as a witness to the Roberts Commission, which investigated the wrongdoings of Admiral Husband E. Kimmel and Lieutenant general Walter C. Short. He participated in the hearings until the end of January 1942 and then rejoined 2nd Battalion, 5th Marines.

=== Guadalcanal ===
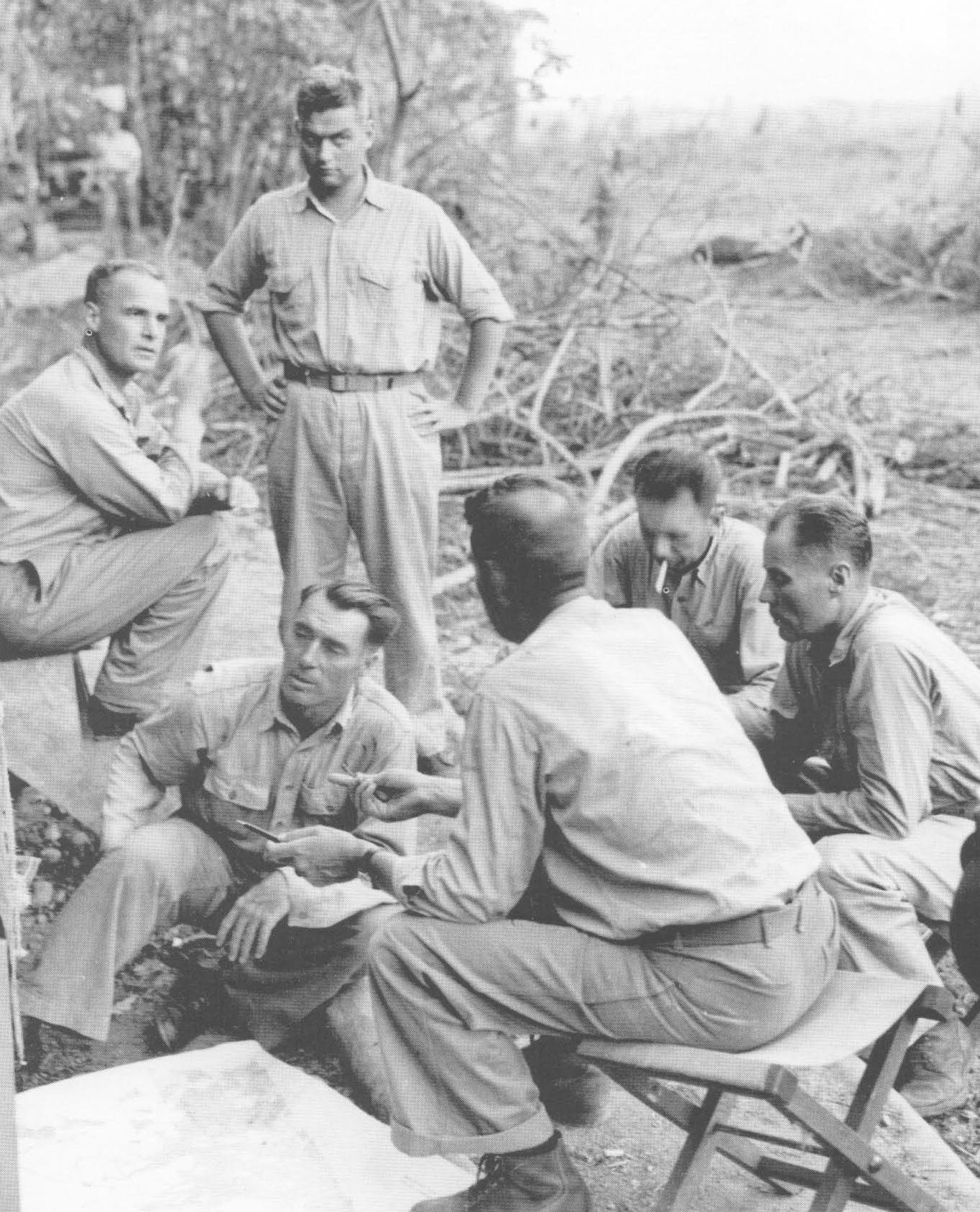
Colonel "Wild Bill" Whaling (sitting on ground) overlooking map of Guadalcanal with accompanying officers

He was promoted to the capacity of executive officer, 5th Marine Regiment under Colonel LeRoy P. Hunt at the end of March 1942 and spent following months with intensive training in order to prepare his unit for combat deployment to South Pacific. Unfortunately, Whaling was known as a Marine of legendary field skills but little administrative ability. Also, Colonel Hunt was known as a charismatic, valiant troop leader, but no organizer, no planner. Thus, the wisdom of Hunt–Whaling team was doubted by some from the divisional staff, including Whaling's old friend, now Divisional operations officer, Colonel Gerald C. Thomas. Whaling was promoted to the temporary rank of colonel on May 21, 1942.

Whaling embarked with 5th Marine Regiment for New Zealand during June 1942 and after one month of training near Wellington, they sailed for Guadalcanal, Solomon Islands. He went ashore on August 7, 1942, and although the regiment had initial success in combat, its advance began slowing. Commanding General of 1st Marine Division, Alexander Vandegrift, realized that some changes must be done within the 5th Marines command and relieved Colonel Hunt on September 25, 1942. Whaling was relieved of command four days later, but unlike Hunt, he was not ordered back to the United States.

Thanks to the interference of Colonel Gerald C. Thomas, who was now divisional chief of staff, Whaling remained with the division. Although Whaling was unassigned, he suggested to Thomas to organize a scout-sniper unit of one hundred volunteers for close patrolling. General Vandegrift, who was an admirer of Lieutenant Colonel Robert Rogers, who had organized and trained raider units skilled in close combat and reconnaissance behind enemy lines during the French and Indian War, approved the idea and Whaling began with the organization of scout-sniper detachment and training of specially selected groups trained in scouting stalking and ambush tactics. Whaling developed his ideas for reconnaissance units and created the basics for Marine Scout and sniper Company and for Marine Recon itself.

During the combats on Matanikau River at the beginning of October 1942, Whaling organized a special task group (called Whaling Group), composed of 3rd Battalion, 2nd Marines and the scout-snipers and took part in the heavy fighting and encirclement of Japanese troops west of Matanikau. Between October 6 and 9, approximately 750 men from the Japanese 4th Infantry Regiment were killed.

Whaling's group was then ordered to the rear and reorganized, when 3rd Battalion, 2nd Marines was succeeded by 3rd Battalion, 7th Marines. It was subsequently ordered back to the frontlines and participated in the encirclement and annihilation of the remnants of Japanese 4th Infantry Regiment near Point Cruz between November 1–4, 1942.

The 1st Marine Division was relieved by Americal Division on December 9, 1942, and ordered to Australia for rest and rehabilitation after almost 3,000 casualties suffered on Guadalcanal. Despite initial difficulties during Whaling's service with 5th Marines, he restored his reputation as Commander of Scout-sniper reconnaissance unit and was decorated with the Legion of Merit with Combat "V" and Navy Presidential Unit Citation.

=== New Britain ===
While in Australia, Whaling was appointed commanding officer, 1st Marine Regiment and supervised the rebuilding of regiment and intensive training until December 1943. He then embarked with his regiment to New Britain, where he was tasked with the capture of Cape Gloucester and its two airfields, which could be used in the future for allied offensive air operations.

Whaling took part in the main landing on December 26, 1943, and in cooperation with John T. Selden's 5th Marines and Julian N. Frisbie's 7th Marines, he captured the airfield on December 29. His regiment then participated in the mopping-up operations against scattered remnants of the Japanese garrison until the end of January 1944. Whaling was succeeded in command of 1st Marines by Colonel Chesty Puller on February 28, 1944, and ordered to the United States under rotation policy. For his service at Cape Gloucester, Whaling was decorated with his second Legion of Merit.

=== Okinawa ===
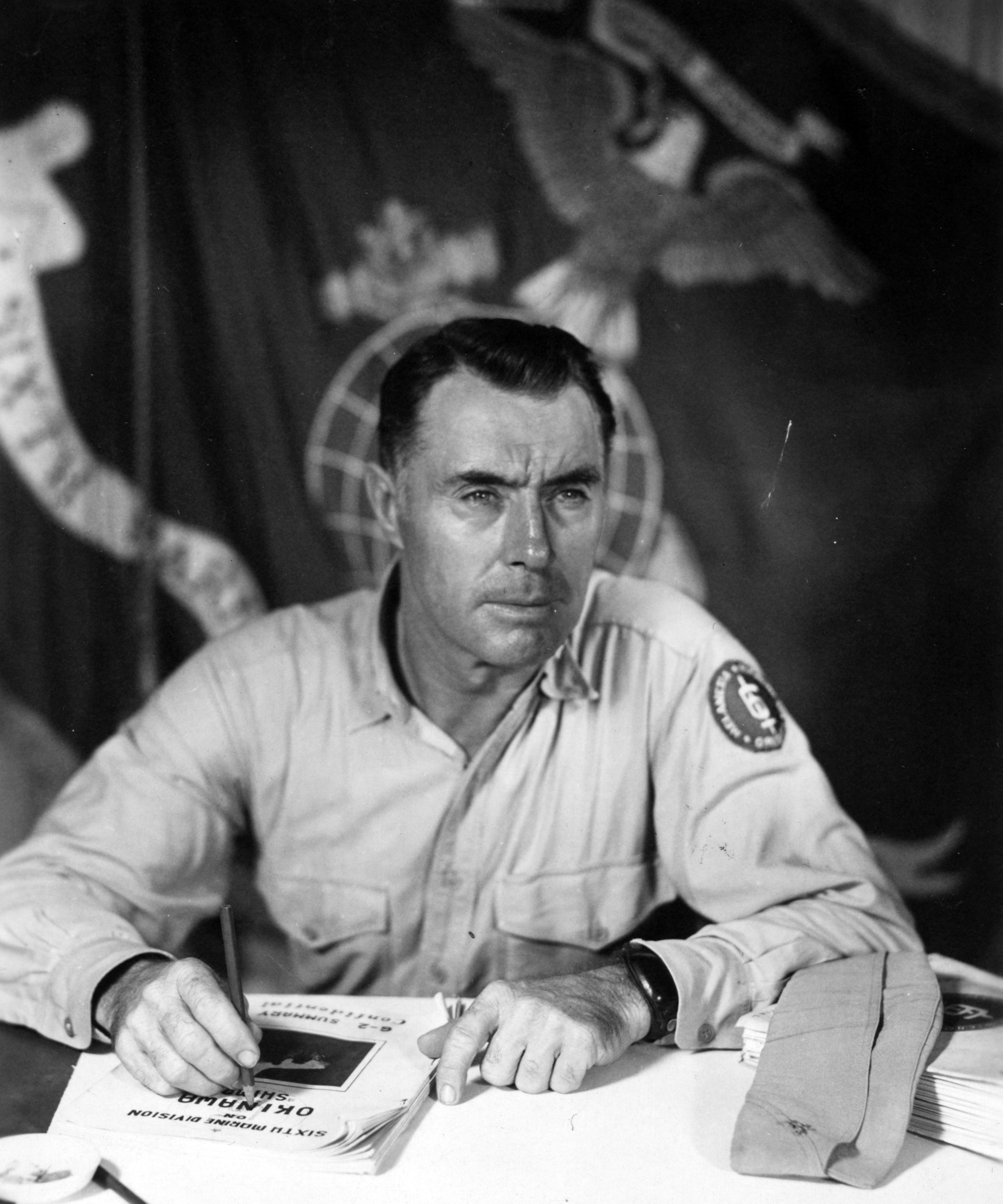
Colonel Whaling as Commanding officer of 29th Marine Regiment.

Following his return to the United States in April 1944, Whaling briefly served at the Headquarters Marine Corps in Washington, D.C., before he was ordered to Camp Pendleton, California. He was appointed commanding officer of the 2nd Training Regiment there and was responsible for the training of new recruits, who later served as replacements for combat units serving overseas until March 1945.

Whaling then embarked for the Pacific area and joined the headquarters of 6th Marine Division under Major General Lemuel C. Shepherd Jr., whom he knew from his service at New Britain. The Sixth Marine Division embarked for Okinawa at the beginning of April 1945 and general Shepherd quickly found an appropriate assignment for Whaling. The division's 29th Marine Regiment was not advancing fast enough to Shepherd's expectations. Shepherd relieved commanding officer of the regiment, Victor Bleasdale and replaced him with Whaling on April 14, 1945.

Colonel Whaling's regiment was now fighting Japanese forces on Motobu Peninsula with orders to advance toward the enemy's last defensive positions on the peninsula at Mount Yaedake. Whaling consolidated the regiment's positions first and repelled several Japanese counterattacks supported by artillery, mortar and machinegun fire. In cooperation with Colonel Alan Shapley's 4th Marine Regiment, who were assaulting Japanese positions on Mount Yaedake, Whaling and his regiment maintained unrelenting pressure against the enemy's rear positions.

During his advance through rugged and precipitous mountain terrain, Whaling skillfully maneuvered elements of his command and several times unhesitatingly exposed himself to direct hostile fire among the most advanced elements of his regiment. Japanese forces resisted stubbornly from log-revetted bunkers and occasional concrete emplacements, and from machine gun, mortar, and artillery positions concealed in ravines and in caves on the heights.

Following the capture of Motobu Peninsula, Whaling and his regiment proceeded to Oroku Peninsula, where he fought until the end of hostilities on Okinawa on June 22, 1945. For his leadership and gallantry in action, he was decorated with the Navy Cross, the United States military's second-highest decoration awarded for valor in combat. Whaling also received his second Navy Presidential Unit Citation.

== Postwar service ==
=== North China ===
Following the Okinawa campaign, the Sixth Marine Division including Whaling's 29th Marine Regiment were ordered to Guam for rest and refit. Between July and September, the 29th Marines conducted intensive training program and subsequently embarked for North China by the beginning of October 1945. Whaling landed at the city of Qingdao on October 11 and was tasked with the occupation of the city with 1,300,000 inhabitants and the adjacent Tsangkou Airfield.

On October 25, 1945, Whaling's regiment participated in the disarmament of Japanese 5th Independent Mixed Brigade under Major General Eiji Nagano and subsequent repatriation of Japanese military personnel. During the following two months, Whaling and his troops conducted guard duties in order to maintain peace and assisted local authorities in preventing disease and starvation of the civilians. Upon the appointment of new division's commanding general, Archie F. Howard in December that year, Whaling remained as commanding officer of 29th Marines and supervised the deactivation of the regiment on April 1, 1946. For his service in China, he was awarded the Bronze Star Medal and the Chinese Order of the Cloud and Banner, 4th Class.

=== Korean War ===
Whaling was subsequently assigned as chief of staff of the Marine Corps Base Camp Lejeune, North Carolina and served in this capacity until the end of June 1949. He was promoted to the rank of brigadier general on July 1, 1949, and assumed duty as Assistant Division Commander of the 2nd Marine Division under the command of Major General Thomas E. Watson. Following the outbreak of the Korean War in June 1950, his command was responsible for the training of replacement of combat personnel deployed overseas.

At the end of April 1951, Whaling's old friend and former superior, Gerald C. Thomas, was given a command of 1st Marine Division, which was already deployed in Korea since summer 1950. Thomas asked Commandant Clifton B. Cates to appoint Whaling as 1st Marine Division Assistant Commander and Cates agreed. Whaling arrived to Korea in May that year and replaced Chesty Puller in his new capacity. He became a second set of eyes for evaluating tactical situations and training. His easy manner and "good old boy" charm gave him access to troops that Thomas could not and did not have. Whaling conducted "special reconnaissance" missions with his shotgun that kept fresh pheasants and ducks in the general's mess.

Whaling participated in the Battle of the Punchbowl in August–September 1951, which was one of the last battles of the movement phase of the Korean War and during which 1st Marine Division killed over 3,000 of North Korean troops. The rest of the year and early 1952, spent division on the Jamestown Line, the UN's Main line of resistance and saw only occasional fighting. Upon the detachment of General Thomas in January 1952, Whaling remained with 1st Marine Division under new commanding general John T. Selden, another comrade from Cape Gloucester, until the end of March when he was succeeded by Merrill B. Twining and ordered back to the United States under rotation policy. For his service in Korea, Whaling was decorated with Army Distinguished Service Medal and Air Medal for participation in the reconnaissance flights over enemy-lines.

=== Retirement ===
Following his return stateside, Whaling was ordered to Marine Corps Recruit Depot San Diego, California, succeeding Major General William T. Clement as commanding general of the Depot. He was responsible for the recruit training on the West Coast until September that year, when Major general John T. Walker, more senior in rank assumed command of the depot and Whaling was appointed his deputy.

Whaling served in this capacity July 1, 1954, when he retired from the Marine Corps after 37 years on active duty. He was advanced to the rank of major general on the retired list for having been specially commended in combat.

== Death ==
Upon his retirement from the Marine Corps, Whaling settled in Lyons, New Jersey, where he died on November 20, 1989, aged 95. He was buried beside his wife, Vona C. Whaling, with full military honors at Arlington National Cemetery in Virginia. They had two sons, William John Whaling Jr., who died at the age of 3. and Robert W. Whaling died at the age of 31.

== Decorations ==
Here is the ribbon bar of Major General Whaling:

1st Row	Navy Cross			
2nd Row	Army Distinguished Service Medal	Silver Star	Legion of Merit with one 5/16" gold star and Combat "V"	Bronze Star Medal
3rd Row	Air Medal	Purple Heart with one 5/16" gold star	Navy Presidential Unit Citation with two stars	Marine Corps Expeditionary Medal
4th Row	World War I Victory Medal with five battle clasps	Army of Occupation of Germany Medal	Second Nicaraguan Campaign Medal	Yangtze Service Medal
5th Row	American Defense Service Medal with Base Clasp	American Campaign Medal	Asiatic-Pacific Campaign Medal with five 3/16 inch service stars	World War II Victory Medal
6th Row	China Service Medal	National Defense Service Medal	Korean Service Medal with one 3/16 inch service star	Haitian National Order of Honour and Merit
7th Row	Haitian Médaille militaire with Diploma	Order of the Cloud and Banner, 4th Class (Republic of China)	Korean Presidential Unit Citation	United Nations Korea Medal

=== Navy Cross citation ===
Citation:

The President of the United States of America takes pleasure in presenting the Navy Cross to Colonel William J. Whaling (MCSN: 0-1049), United States Marine Corps, for extraordinary heroism as Commanding Officer of the Twenty-Ninth Marines, SIXTH Marine Division in action against the enemy Japanese forces on Okinawa, Ryukyu Islands, from 15 April to 21 June 1945. Assuming command of a regiment committed to extensive operations over an exceptionally broad zone of action on Motobu Peninsula, Colonel Whaling skillfully maneuvered elements of his command through rugged and precipitous mountain terrain to aid in driving the enemy to a final defensive position on Mount Yaetake. Though his forces were widely dispersed during this phase of the campaign, he unhesitatingly exposed himself to direct hostile fire among the most advanced elements of his Regiment, thereby obtaining maximum coordination which resulted in crushing the last enemy resistance. By his conspicuous bravery in personally directing assault units, Colonel Whaling contributed materially to the seizure of the desperately defended Sugar Loaf Hill. His aggressive and inspiring leadership during the subsequent landing on Oroku Peninsula was an important factor in the successful reduction of one of the most heavily fortified Japanese strongholds encountered. Colonel Whaling's gallant conduct throughout was in keeping with the highest traditions of the United States Naval Service.

== See also ==
- 6th Marine Division
- Battle of Okinawa

Military offices
Preceded by William T. Clement	Commanding General, Marine Corps Recruit Depot San Diego; April 22, 1952 - September 12, 1952	Succeeded by John T. Walker
Preceded by Victor Bleasdale	Commanding Officer, 29th Marine Regiment; April 15, 1945 - March 31, 1946	Succeeded by Unit deactivated
Preceded by Clifton B. Cates	Commanding Officer, 1st Marine Regiment; February 10, 1943 - February 28, 1944	Succeeded by Chesty Puller
