= Know thyself (disambiguation) =

Know thyself is translated from an ancient Greek aphorism (Greek: γνῶθι σεαυτόν or gnothi seauton).

Know thyself or Know yourself may also refer to:

== Books ==
- Gnothi Seauton: Know Yourself, a 1734 poetry book by John Arbuthnot and others
- Conócete a ti mismo (English: Know Yourself), a 1913 book by the Spanish philosopher Joaquín Trincado Mateo

== Music ==
- "Know Yourself", song by Sizzla from Rise to the Occasion
- No Thyself, the fifth studio album by Magazine released in 2011
- "Know Yourself", song by Drake from his mixtape If You're Reading This It's Too Late

== Other ==
- "Know Thyself", an episode of the NBC television drama series Third Watch first broadcast in 2000

== See also ==
- Gnothi seauton (disambiguation)
