= National Heroines and Heroes of Nicaragua =

National Heroines and Heroes of Nicaragua are promulgated by legal decree of the Nicaraguan Legislature. Those who receive the title are people who were instrumental in helping the country gain its independence, or who worked to maintain the sovereignty and national self-determination of the country. Initially called National Heroes of Nicaragua, in 2014 legislation was passed via Law No. 859 to change the title to "National Heroines and Heroes of Nicaragua". The amended law provides that to be honored with the title, the person nominated must be deceased, and the nomination must be accompanied by certifications, recognition, or guarantees created by public or private institutions, such as trade unions, artistic associations, sporting organizations, or educational institutions, to confirm their service to the country and exemplary or heroic actions.

== List of National Heroes ==
1. 1971, José Dolores Estrada, Decree No. 1889
2. 1980, Benjamín Zeledón, Decree No. 536
3. 1980, Carlos Fonseca Amador, Decree No. 56
4. 1981, Germán Pomares, Decree No. 799
5. 1981, Rigoberto López Pérez, Decree No. 825
6. 1982, Enmanuel Mongalo y Rubio, Decree No. 1123
7. 1982, Andrés Castro Estrada, Decree No. 1123
8. 1982, Juan Santamaría, Decree No. 1123
9. 1984, José Santos López, Decree No. 1410
10. 2010, Augusto Nicolas Calderón Sandino, Decree No. 711
11. 2011, José Santos Zelaya, Decree No. 6332
12. 2013, Pedro Joaquín Chamorro Cardenal, Decree No. 813
13. 2015, Blanca Aráuz Pineda, Decree No. 897
14. 2016, Rubén Darío, Decree No. 927
