= Battle of San Fernando =

- Part of United States occupation of Nicaragua, Banana Wars
- Battle of San Fernando (Nicaragua)
Date	25 July 1927
Location	San Fernando, Nicaragua
Result	American-Nicaraguan victory

Belligerents
United States; Nicaragua	Sandinistas

Commanders and leaders
(United States) Maj. Oliver Floyd	Augusto César Sandino

Strength
78 marines 37 national guard	40 guerrillas

Casualties and losses
1 killed (died of wounds)	11+ killed
- 1 woman wounded

The Battle of San Fernando took place on July 25, 1927, during the American occupation of Nicaragua of 1926–1933. Shortly after the Battle of Ocotal, an expedition of seventy-eight American Marines and thirty-seven Nicaraguan Provisional Guardsmen led by Major Oliver Floyd were sent hunting for rebel leader Augusto César Sandino. One of their destinations was the town of San Fernando, where Sandino had about forty men waiting for the Marines and their Nicaraguan allies. He placed a sentry outside the village to alert his men of the Marines and Provisional Guard's arrival, but the watchman abandoned his post to be alone with an Indian girl in a nearby shack. The Marines and Nicaraguan government troops marched into San Fernando at 3:00, finding it largely deserted. While galloping across the town's "open, grassy plaza" in order to question an old man, Captain Victor F. Bleasdale and Marine Private Rafael Toro received fire from the waiting Sandinistas, with Toro being mortally wounded. Eventually, the Sandinistas were driven back, leaving eleven of their dead behind. Fighting was over by 3:45. In addition to Marine and Sandinista losses, one woman was wounded in the legs by fire from an automatic weapon.

The battle convinced Major Floyd that he would “have to wage a real blood and thunder campaign” and be involved “in a real small war.”

Major Floyd's Marine and Provisional Guard expedition would continue their advance into northern Nicaragua and be ambushed again by Sandinistas at the Battle of Santa Clara on July 27, 1927.

== American casualties ==
Fatally wounded:
