= Gnothi seauton (disambiguation) =

Gnothi seauton is an ancient Greek aphorism (Greek: γνῶθι σεαυτόν), which means "know yourself" in English.

Gnothi seauton may also refer to:

- "Gnothi Seauton" (Terminator: The Sarah Connor Chronicles), the second episode of the American television series Terminator: The Sarah Connor Chronicles

== See also ==
- Gnothi Seauton: Know Yourself, a 1734 poetry book by John Arbuthnot and others
- Know thyself (disambiguation)
