= San Fernando, Nicaragua =

San Fernando
- Municipality
- Location in Nicaragua
- Coordinates: 13°41′N 86°19′W
- Country: Nicaragua
- Department: Nueva Segovia Department

Area
  - Municipality: 91 sq mi (236 km^{2})

Population (2005)
  - Municipality: 8,549
  - Density: 93.8/sq mi (36.2/km^{2})
  - Urban: 4,330

San Fernando is a municipality in the Nueva Segovia Department of Nicaragua.

San Fernando is located 24 kilometers from the Department Capital, Ocotal, and 250 kilometers from Managua, the Capital of the Republic.

The town was the site of battle that pitted American Marines and Nicaraguan Provisional Guardsmen against Sandinista rebels on July 25, 1927, during the Sandino Rebellion.

== Coffee ==
Within the entire municipality of San Fernando there are more than 10,000 residents, most of whom are coffee farmers. It is estimated that there are approximately 200 coffee farms within the municipality.

The highest point in Nicaragua, Mogotón, which measures 2,106 meters above sea level, is located just 20 kilometers from the town of San Fernando.
