= United States Marine Corps Scout (Tank) and Sniper Company =

The United States Marine Corps Scout and Sniper companies and the Scouts (Tank) companies of the tank battalions were the first among the division's reconnaissance assets. They existed around the same exact moment when 1st and 2nd Marine Division were created. In 1941, each regiment had a scout and sniper platoon. They were assigned to the regimental Headquarters and Service Company. These companies were used in variety of tasks and, on occasion in severe combat, were used as "spare" rifle companies. When 6th Marine Division deactivated after the end of World War II, its recon assets also deactivated. Only the current Marine Division Recon Battalions that exist today hold history reference to the Scout and Sniper Companies.

Many of their scouts and snipers companies were reinforced with tanks for speed and added firepower. These later developed into the Division recon companies (later battalions) that are presently operating in the Marine Regiments today; also forging the Marine Corps modern Scout Sniper teams that are existence. Later in the 1980s, the Light Armored Reconnaissance (LAR) battalions were born from reinforced light tank concept of World War II, remolding the mission plans for division recon. Although this has taken away their expedient armored reconnaissance roles, it was preserved and improved by the LAR battalions.

== Training ==
While the two Marine divisions, (1st and 2nd Marine Division), were still fresh, many of the regimental intelligence sections (G-2) approached reconnaissance differently from the VAC's FMF Amphib Recon Company. Each of the specialized schools were followed by individual training back in the Corps's parent organization. This was normally scheduled by the company commander or the battalion commander. Each unit had its own means of training its Marines from the lessons learned from previous organization's last recon entry behind enemy territory. They kept individual and unit training at a high level of proficiency.

In general, all scout and snipers were trained in scouting and patrolling. This included escape and evasion, land/maritime orientation, knife fighting, close-quarter combat, weapons and demolition, combat swimming, compass swims, hydrographic surveying, etc. Many of these Marines were exceptional marksman and sharpshooters. Most of these courses and training were conducted within the Marine's own training function. However, some were sent to train with the Royal Marines in England, and other specialized schools developed around the areas of the Pacific.

An eight-week course was set up at Mornington Peninsula in Australia, instructed by 1st Lieutenant Holly Whyte. Lt. Whyte gained his recon skills while serving with the 1st Marines on Guadalcanal. The first class of students were mostly combat experienced recon Marines from each of the division's infantry regiments that fought on Guadalcanal. Although scouting and patrolling, field sketching and land navigation were mostly refresher training; rubber boats and amphibious reconnaissance was very new. The nearby Port Phillip bay was used routinely for rubber boat and training.

1st Marine Division's regimental intelligence officers, 1st Lieutenants R. B. Firm and John Bradbeer attended the United States Navy's Amphibious Scouts School. They learned in this eight week course in sophisticated ambushes and raids, and more rubber boat work. Bradbeer and Firm were pulled back to Guadalcanal to the Seventh Fleet's Amphibious component—the 3rd Marine Division. Retained by I Amphibious Corps (I MAC), Bradbeer and Firm was briefed on the pending Treasury Islands missions by Marine Raider Major Richard T. Washburn, who was schooling Raiders and division scouts on amphibious reconnaissance. Washburn's teams were about to depart on an amphib recon mission of the Shortland and Treasury Islands.

== History ==
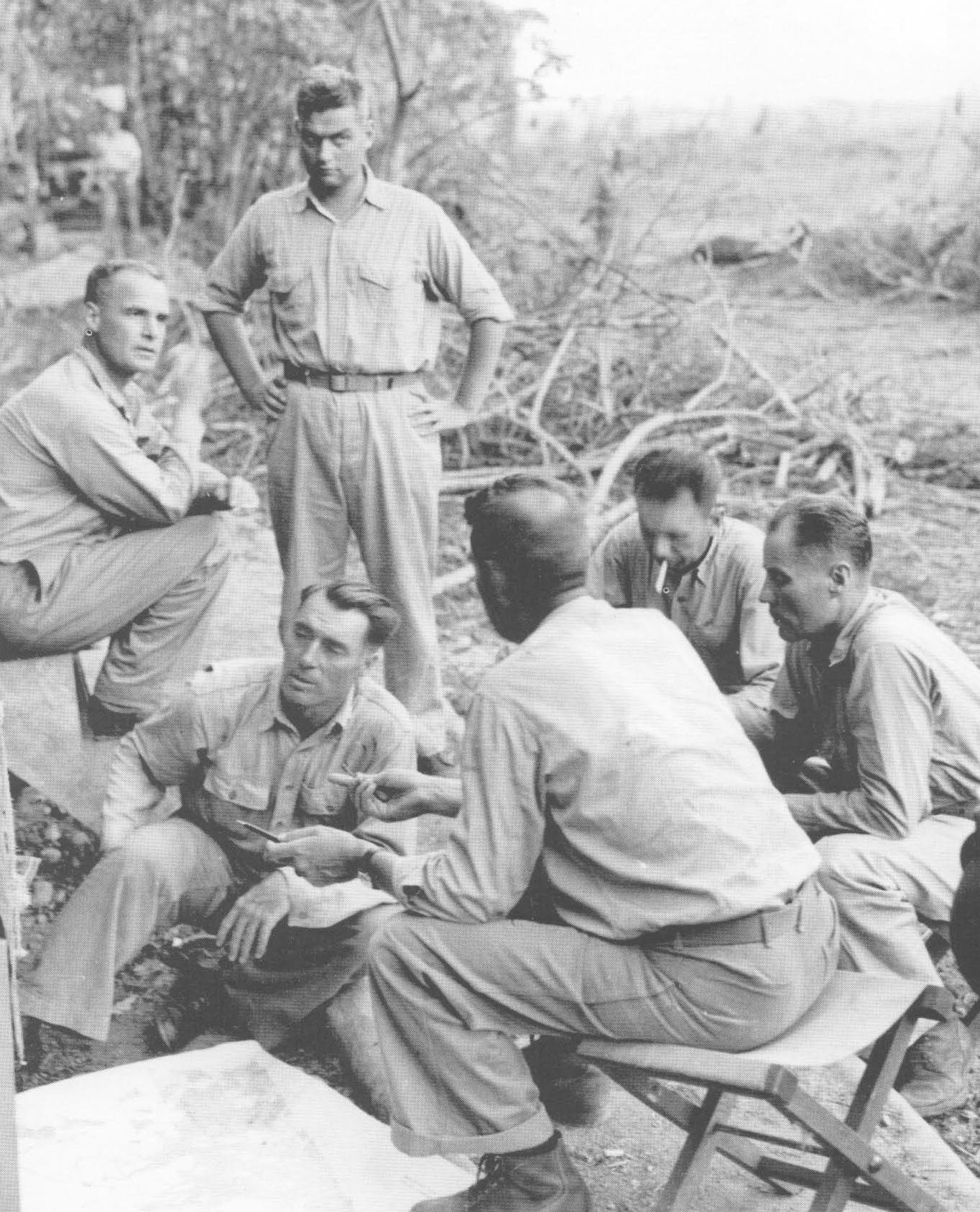
Lt. Colonel "Wild Bill" Whaling [sitting on ground] overlooking map of Guadalcanal with accompanying officers

In 1941, Lieutenant Colonel William "Wild Bill" Whaling, the executive officer of 5th Marine Regiment, 1st Marine Division, visualized and perceived the use for specialized missions encompassing reconnaissance at the division-level, which would be conducted above the normal infantry battalion-level in scouting and patrolling. He recommended to General Alexander Vandegrift the need of a special "Scout and Sniper unit" for the 1st Marine Division on Guadalcanal. Upon approval, by February 1, each of the three rifle companies that were used during the Guadalcanal campaign were tasked in sending one their best field craft Marines to devise the scout-sniper unit with each regiment containing a Scout and Sniper Platoon within the regimental headquarters and service company. This was the birth of division reconnaissance.

Most of these Marines were skilled marksmen and outdoorsmen. General Vandegrift appointed Lt. Colonel Whaling to start a school where the selected Marines received intense additional training. While some Marines weren't selected and were sent back to their units, others took their place and the "Whaling Group" was available to scout and spearhead operations. Initially, they acted as guides in movement of units from one area to another and were able to confirm unit locations in the thick jungle foliage. They later conducted independent patrols into areas of critical interests to the Division.

It wasn't before long many of the regiments requested their scouts to be heavily reinforced with tanks. The mechanized recon scouts proved to be very efficient in reconnaissance in force (RIF). They would ride on top the tanks and rapidly be inserted behind the enemy lines and "look" for the enemy. Whenever encountered, they would fall back and immediately report to the battalion commander of its new findings Although, the division commander retained the amphibious and ground reconnaissance to its company level and took advantage of its sniper development. Those scout and sniper platoons later formed the Marine Scout Sniper and Surveillance and Target Acquisition platoons.

By 1944, The Marine divisions contained elements of scout/snipers, armored recon teams, and ground and amphib recon platoons within the division. Marines from the recently disbanded Raider and the Paramarine battalions filled most of the vacancies. The division commander at that time reassembled the separate division assets. This formation consolidated collecting more efficiently under the Commanding General and his Intelligence (G-2) and Operations (G-3) staffs.

=== World War II ===
Prior to the arrival of Marines in this area of the Pacific War, the Australians had already established a network of deep reconnaissance agents known as the Australian Coastwatchers. They operated not only on coasts, but deep in jungles as well. Initially, some Marines became part of the unit.

The I Marine Amphibious Corps (I MAC) and III Marine Amphibious Corps (III MAC) approached its reconnaissance assets more differently from the V Amphibious Corps's (VAC) FMF Amphib Recon platoons
