= Blanca Aráuz =

Nicaraguan rebel (1909–1933)

- Blanca Aráuz and Augusto César Sandino in 1932
- Born: Blanca Stella Aráuz Pineda; 25 May 1909; San Rafael del Norte, Las Segovias, Nicaragua
- Died: 2 June 1933 (aged 24); San Rafael del Norte, Nicaragua
- Other names: Blanca Estela Aráuz, Blanca Aráuz de Sandino
- Occupation: telegrapher
- Years active: 1919–1933
- Known for: intelligence gathering and peace facilitation

Blanca Stella Aráuz Pineda (25 May 1909 – 2 June 1933) is the first National Heroine of Nicaragua. She was noted as a telegraphist who assisted the guerrilla forces during the United States occupation of Nicaragua and who negotiated with President Juan Bautista Sacasa to gain amnesty for the rebels and negotiate peace at the end of the conflict.

== Early life ==
Blanca Stella Aráuz Pineda was born on 25 May 1909 in the town of San Rafael del Norte in Las Segovias region (now in the Jinotega Department), of Nicaragua to Esther Pineda Rivera and Pablo Jesús Aráuz Rivera. She was the youngest of eleven children, all of whom learned Morse code from a young age. Her mother was a tailor and dressmaker and her father managed the local telegraph office. From the age of ten, Aráuz had mastered telegraphy by playing in her father's office and being taught to use the equipment by her sister Lucila.

== Career ==
In 1927, when the guerrilla leader, Augusto César Sandino came to San Rafael del Norte, during the Constitutionalist War, he established his headquarters in the telegraph office, which was directly across the street from the American marine's headquarters. Because of the location, Aráuz was able to monitor the American forces' movements and advise Sandino. She was also known to intercept messages and send misinformation, becoming a valuable link in the intelligence service for the Army in Defense of the National Sovereignty of Nicaragua (Spanish: Ejército Defensor de la Soberanía Nacional de Nicaragua (EDSNN)). The two spent long hours collaborating on a plan to capture the city of Jinotega and simultaneously send forces to assist General José María Moncada. Working closely together, Aráuz and Sandino fell in love and were married in a religious ceremony on 19 May 1927. Within two days, Sandino returned to the front and Aráuz returned to her work in the telegraph office tracking the enemy troops and the nationals who collaborated with them. Periodically, she would live with Sandino in the camps, though travel was difficult.

Aráuz became a target of both the Díaz administration's National Guard and the United States Marine Corps. On 2 March 1929, Aráuz was arrested, as it was suspected that she had been sending messages to her husband. She was taken to Managua, where she was imprisoned for seven months. The following year, she was arrested again and sent with her mother and sister to Prison 21 in León. In this notorious prison, she was tortured in an attempt to force her to reveal Sandino's whereabouts. Pressure from family friends and the local bishop secured her removal to La Recolección Monastery. While there, she learned typing and practiced her needlework. Sandino threatened the National Guard with reprisals if his family was not released and after six months, she was allowed to return home. From 1930, Sandino became involved in an anti-clerical battle with the local priests in Las Segovias, haranguing them for urging the local inhabitants to avoid the fighting and accept the governance of the U.S. forces.

In 1931 Aráuz joined Sandino in his camp headquarters, though the most fierce campaigns were fought in Las Segovias. She soon became pregnant, though she miscarried a child in 1931 and another in 1932. During her time in the camps, she wrote the poem Para mi viejito queridísimo Augusto César Sandino (For my dear old Augusto César Sandino) in 1932. Later that same year, Juan Bautista Sacasa won the presidential election. The United States forces were preparing to leave Nicaragua, and Sandino appointed Aráuz to go to Managua to initiate his terms of surrender. Though she was four months pregnant, Aráuz left in December 1932 to meet with the delegation in San Rafael del Norte. She fell from her mule during the trip, but managed to arrive on 4 January 1933 and convince the officers that she had a safe conduct pass from Sacasa to continue her journey. Leading a peace commission, including Gregorio Sandino, Sofonías Salvatierra, and América Tiffer de Sandino, they arrived in Managua on 6 January 1933. Aráuz advised Sacasa that Sandino was willing to negotiate with his new government and lay down his arms.

The couple decided to have a civil ceremony to legitimize their marriage and were married in San Rafael del Norte by the local judge on 27 May 1933. Almost immediately after the ceremony, Sandino left for Managua to finalize the terms of the peace treaty.

== Death and legacy ==
Aráuz died in the childbirth of her only surviving daughter, Blanca Segovia Sandino Aráuz, on 2 June 1933. After her death, Aráuz was memorialized by Luis Enrique Mejía Godoy in two songs Allá va el general (There goes the general) and Carta de amor a Blanquita (Love letter to Blanquita). In 2012, she was posthumously awarded the Honorary Medal for Meritorious Soldiers of the Fatherland. In 2015, she was decreed by a statute, as the first National Heroine of Nicaragua.
