= 29th Marine Regiment (United States) =

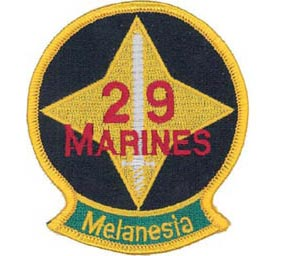
- 29th Marine Regiment Insignia
- Active: deactivated 1 April 1946
- Country: United States of America
- Branch: United States Marine Corps
- Part of: 6th Marine Division
- Engagements: World War II; Battle of Saipan (1st Battalion only); Battle of Eniwetok; Battle of Guam; Volcano and Ryukyu Islands campaign; Battle of Okinawa

Commanders
- Notable commanders: Victor Bleasdale; William J. Whaling

The 29th Marine Regiment (29th Marines) is an inactive infantry regiment of the United States Marine Corps. The last Marine Corps regiment activated for service in World War II, its First Battalion fought in the Battle of Saipan while attached to the 2nd Marine Division; the entire regiment also fought in Okinawa while attached to the 6th Marine Division, and took part in the occupation of Northern China following the war. The 29th Marine Regiment was subsequently deactivated in 1946 as part of the post-war drawdown of forces.

== History ==
Originally an "orphan unit", the First Battalion of the 29th Marine Regiment was formed as the Second Separate Infantry Battalion in February 1944 and redesignated as 1/29 en route to its first combat assignment, attached to the 2nd Marine Division. Following a month of operational training on the King Ranch in Hawaii, 1/29 went into combat during the Battle of Saipan (15 June – 9 July 1944) first, under the command of Lieutenant Colonel Guy E. Tannyhill, then (following Tannyhill being wounded in action on 17 June) under the command of Lieut. Col. Rathvon M. Tompkins, and finally (following Tompkins being wounded in action on 2 July) by Lieut. Col. Jack P. Juhan. Despite sustaining heavy casualties in combat beginning with the initial landing on 15 June, 1/29 particularly distinguished itself during the "Battle of the Mountain (Mount Tapotchau)", which took place during 22 – 29 June. 1/29 remained attached to the Second Marine Division until September 1944, when it was sent to Guadalcanal to join the rest of its parent outfit, the 29th Regiment of the 6th Marine Division.

The parent unit itself was activated at Camp Lejeune, North Carolina as a separate reinforced regiment on 1 May 1944. Its first commander was Colonel Victor Bleasdale, an expert instructor and decorated World War I veteran, who served as Chief of Staff of the training center in Camp Lejeune. The regiment was assigned to the 6th Marine Division under Major General Lemuel C. Shepherd Jr. on 10 September 1944.

=== Battle of Okinawa ===
The regiment was due to be the reserve for the 6th Marine Division but was able to come ashore on the island on D-Day, 1 April 1945, due to the lack of resistance at the outset of the battle. They initially swept through the northern Motobu Peninsula where except for heavy fighting during the Battle of Yae Take they met only moderate resistance. About two weeks after landing, division commanding general Lemuel C. Shepherd Jr. relieved the regiment's C.O., Colonel Victor F. Bleasdale, a well-decorated World War I veteran, replacing him effective 14 April with Guadalcanal veteran Colonel William J. Whaling.

Following heavy fighting in the south the 6th Marine Division replaced the 27th Infantry Division on the western side of the island. The 29th made steady progress south until 12 May 1945 when on the outskirts of Naha, Okinawa, they ran into a low, loaf-shaped hill which was soon to be named Sugar Loaf Hill.

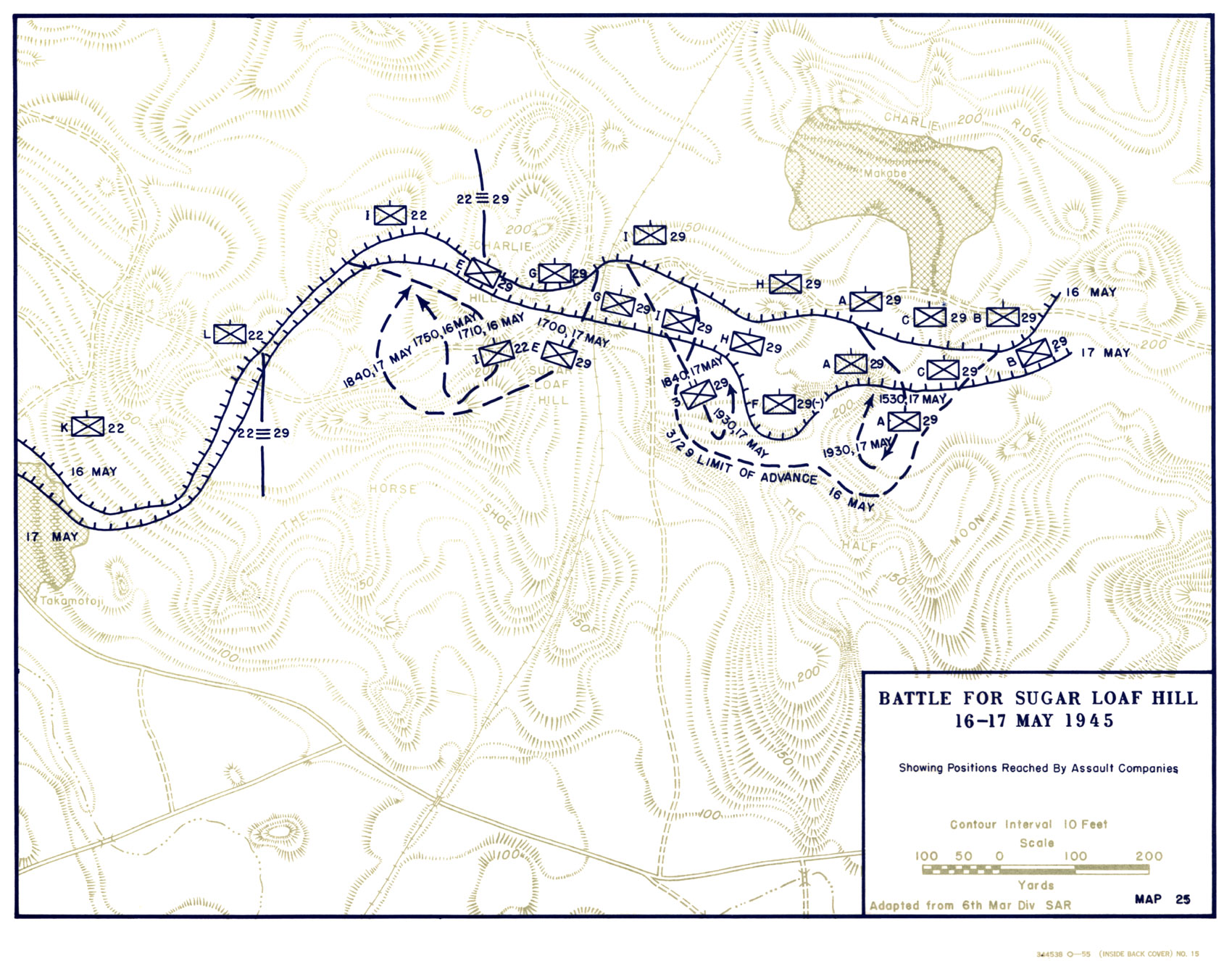
Map of the battle of Sugar Loaf Hill

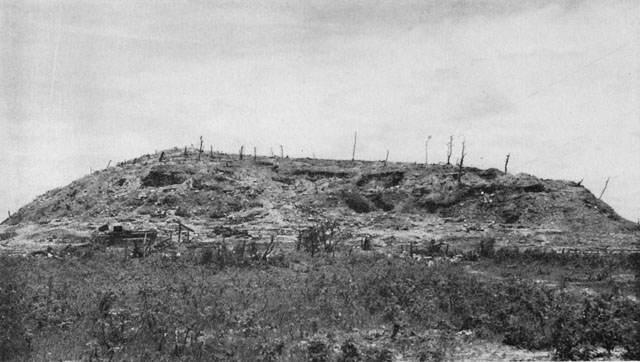
Sugar Loaf Hill as seen from the north

The hill was part of a complex of three hills that formed the western anchor of General Mitsuru Ushijima's Shuri Line defense. Originally the objective of the 22nd Marine Regiment, the 29th would relieve them on 16 May and would sustain heavy casualties over the course of the next few days while taking the hill. They made numerous frontal assaults on the hill and finally secured it on 18 May but in the process they sustained so many casualties that they were rendered combat ineffective and would eventually be relieved by the 4th Marine Regiment before the push into Naha. The fighting was so intense that during the relief in place the 4th Marines sustained 70 casualties.

=== Occupation of Northern China ===
While recuperating on Guam the war ended and that September the regiment received a warning order for it to prepare to move to China. Following the surrender of Japan, the entire 6th Marine Division was sent to Northern China with the main mission of accepting the surrender of Japanese forces there and helping to repatriate those soldiers and other Japanese nationals back to Japan.

== Notable members ==
- Robert M. McTureous Jr. - recipient of the Medal of Honor for actions during the Battle of Okinawa.
- William Manchester – later a noted historian, published biographies of Winston Churchill and Douglas MacArthur; his 1980 bestseller Goodbye Darkness: A Memoir of the Pacific War was later discovered to contain multiple exaggerations and falsehoods.

== Unit awards ==
A unit citation or commendation is an award bestowed upon an organization for the action cited. Members of the unit who participated in said actions are allowed to wear on their uniforms the awarded unit citation. The 29th Marine Regiment has been presented with the following awards:

| Streamer | Award | Year(s) | Additional Info |
|---|---|---|---|
| | Presidential Unit Citation Streamer with one Silver and three Bronze Stars | 1945 | Okinawa |
| | Asiatic-Pacific Campaign Streamer with one Bronze Star | | Okinawa |
| | World War II Victory Streamer | 1941–1945 | Pacific War |
| | Navy Occupation Service Streamer with "ASIA" | | |
| | China Service Streamer with one Bronze Star | October 1946 – Mar 1946 | North China |

== In popular culture ==
The novel Take China: The Last of the China Marines by Harold Stephens depicts the 29th Marine Regiment and takes place in China during its civil war.
