= Battle of Santa Clara (1927) =

- Part of United States occupation of Nicaragua, Banana Wars Battle of Santa Clara (1927) (Nicaragua)
Date	27 July 1927
Location	near Santa Clara, Nicaragua
Result	American-Nicaraguan victory

Belligerents
United States; Nicaragua	(Nicaragua) Sandinistas

Commanders and leaders
(United States) Maj. Oliver Floyd	(Nicaragua) Porfirio Sanchez

Strength
75 marines 150 national guard 2 aircraft	120– 150 guerrillas 2 machine guns

Casualties and losses
None	60 killed (from both the skirmish and the airstrike.); 1 captured (later released); 12 mules killed 8 mules captured

The Battle of Santa Clara took place on 27 July 1927, during the American occupation of Nicaragua of 1926–1933. After being ambushed by Sandinista forces at the Battle of San Fernando, Major Oliver Floyd's expedition of American Marines and Nicaraguan Provisional Guardsmen continued its advance into enemy-held territory in northern Nicaragua.

On the 27 July two American airplanes spotted forty Sandinistas waiting in ambush. The aircraft received fire from an enemy machine gun and a dive bombing raid ensued, with three bombs being dropped on the Nicaraguan rebels. The American aviators reported seeing six Sandinistas "dead or seriously wounded."

Major Floyd's Marine and Provisional Guard expedition eventually reached the area one mile southeast of Santa Clara, where they were attacked by a force of between 60 and 120 (possibly up to 150) Sandinista insurgents who were armed with two machine guns. One of the machine guns was confirmed to be a Lewis gun and the other one was suspected of being one as well.

The battle raged from 2:30 to 4:00, with the Sandinistas being eventually driven back.

The American and Nicaraguan government forces didn't suffer any casualties, while five dead rebels were found on the battlefield. However, Augusto César Sandino would later admit to losing up to 60 men killed and wounded during the action (although this number may include the casualties from the air raid prior to the battle). Sandino had a tendency to greatly exaggerate numbers related to the battles during his rebellion, so this number of 60 is probably inaccurate. One young Sandinista, who was pretending to be dead, was captured, but later released.

In addition to human losses, twelve of Sandino's animals were killed and eight were captured.

The clash at Santa Clara, along with the previous battles at Ocotal and San Fernando (both of which also took place in July 1927) convinced Sandino to alter his tactics. According to author Neill Macaulay, "he would attack only when the odds were heavily in his favor-when he clearly had the advantages of surprise, cover, and superior firepower. Never again would he foolishly 'stand his ground,' nor would he try to redeem an attack that had hopelessly bogged down. Major Floyd might wage a 'blood and thunder campaign,' but Sandino would adopt the hit-and-run tactics of guerrilla warfare." After the Battle of Santa Clara, the Sandinistas fell back to "the jungles around El Chipote mountain," which was "ideal country for guerrilla warfare."
