= Zepeda =

Zepeda is a Spanish surname. Notable people with the surname include:

- Andrea-Mae Zepeda (born 1995), Austrian cricketer
- David Zepeda of Nogales (born 1973), Sonora, represented Mexico in the Manhunt International 2000 pageant, Singapore, in 2000
- Gwendolyn Zepeda (born 1971), American author
- Jose Zepeda (born 1989), American boxer
- Lorenzo Zepeda, President of El Salvador 1–7 February 1858
- Luis Alberto Zepeda Félix (born 1965), Paralympian athlete from Mexico competing mainly in category F53/F54 javelin events
- Miguel Zepeda (born 1976), Mexican football player
- Ofelia Zepeda (born 1952), Tohono O'odham poet and intellectual
- Omar Zepeda (born 1977), Mexican race walker
- Rafael Zepeda (born 1961), Mexican long-distance athlete
- Selvin Zepeda (born 1981), Salvadoran football (soccer) player who represented El Salvador at international level
