= William T. Clement =

United States Marine Corps general

William Tardy Clement
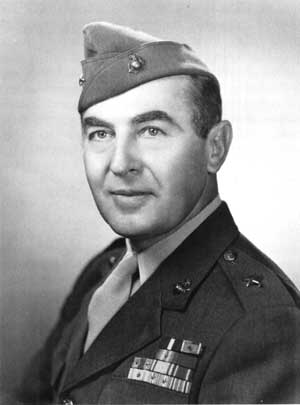
- William T. Clement
- Born: September 27, 1894; Lynchburg, Virginia, US
- Died: October 17, 1955 (aged 61); Bethesda, Maryland, US
- Military career
- Allegiance: United States of America
- Branch: United States Marine Corps
- Service years: 1917–1952
- Rank: Lieutenant general
- Service number: 0-170
- Commands: MCRD San Diego; Marine Corps Reserve; 3rd Marine Brigade
- Conflicts: Haitian Campaign; World War I Yangtze Patrol; World War II: Philippines Campaign; Battle of Okinawa; Occupation of Japan
- Awards: Navy Cross; Legion of Merit (3); Bronze Star Medal

William Tardy Clement (September 27, 1894 – October 17, 1955) was a highly decorated general of the United States Marine Corps with the rank of lieutenant general during World War II. He is most noted as commanding general of Fleet Landing Force that would make the first landing on the Japanese home islands following the nation's unconditional surrender.

== Biography ==
Clement was born in Lynchburg, Virginia, and graduated from Virginia Military Institute. Less than a month after reporting for active duty in 1917, Clement sailed for Haiti where he joined the 2nd Marine Regiment and its operations against rebel bandits.

Upon his return to the United States in 1919, he reported for duty at Marine Barracks, Quantico, where he remained until 1923, when he became post adjutant of the Marine detachment at the American Legation in Peking, China. In 1926, he was assigned to the 4th Marine Regiment at San Diego as adjutant and in October of the same year was given command of a company of Marines on mail guard duty in Denver, Colorado, where he remained for three months until rejoining the 4th Marines. Clement sailed with the regiment for duty in China in 1927 and was successively a company commander and regimental operations and training officer. Following his return to the United States in 1929, he became the executive officer of Marine Corps Recruit Depot San Diego, and then commanding officer of the Marine detachment on board the West Virginia (BB-48). Clement spent most of the 1930s at Quantico, first as a student, then as an instructor, and finally as a battalion commander with the 5th Marines.

The outbreak of World War II found Clement serving on the staff of the Commander-in-Chief, Asiatic Fleet in the Philippines. Although quartered at Corregidor, he served as a liaison between the commandant, 16th Naval District; the commanding general, U.S. Army Forces in the Far East; and particularly with the forces engaged on Bataan until ordered to leave on board the U.S. submarine Snapper (SS-185) for Australia in April 1942. For his handling of the diversified units engaged at Cavite Navy Yard and on Bataan, he was awarded the Navy Cross.

Following tours in Europe and at Quantico, Clement joined the 6th Marine Division in November 1944 as assistant division commander and took part in the Okinawa campaign. Leading the 4th Marines ashore at Yokosuka on 30 August, was a memorable event in Clement's life and career—command of the Fleet Landing Force that would make the first landing on the Japanese home islands following the nation's unconditional surrender.

Less than two months after the Yokosuka landing, he rejoined the division in Northern China. When the division was redesignated the 3rd Marine Brigade, Clement became commanding general and in June 1946 was named commanding general, Marine Forces, Tsingtao Area.

Returning to the United States in September, he was appointed president, Naval Retiring Board, and then director, Marine Corps Reserve. In September 1949, he assumed command of Marine Corps Recruit Depot San Diego, holding that post until his retirement in 1952. Lieutenant General Clement died in 1955.

== Awards & honors ==
Clement is the recipient of the following awards:

1st Row	Navy Cross			
2nd Row	Legion of Merit with "V" Device and two 5/16" Gold Stars	Bronze Star Medal	Navy Presidential Unit Citation with two stars	Army Presidential Unit Citation with Oak leaf cluster
3rd Row	Marine Corps Expeditionary Medal with two service stars	World War I Victory Medal with West Indies Clasp	Haitian Campaign Medal	Yangtze Service Medal
4th Row	China Service Medal	American Defense Service Medal with Foreign Service Clasp	Asiatic-Pacific Campaign Medal with three 3/16 inch bronze service stars	American Campaign Medal
5th Row	European-African-Middle Eastern Campaign Medal	World War II Victory Medal	Navy Occupation Service Medal	National Defense Service Medal
6th Row	Philippine Defense Medal with one star	Order of the Cloud and Banner, Fourth Grade	Order of the Sacred Tripod, Fourth Grade	Dutch Order of Orange-Nassau with Swords, Commander
