= San Rafael del Norte =

- Municipality
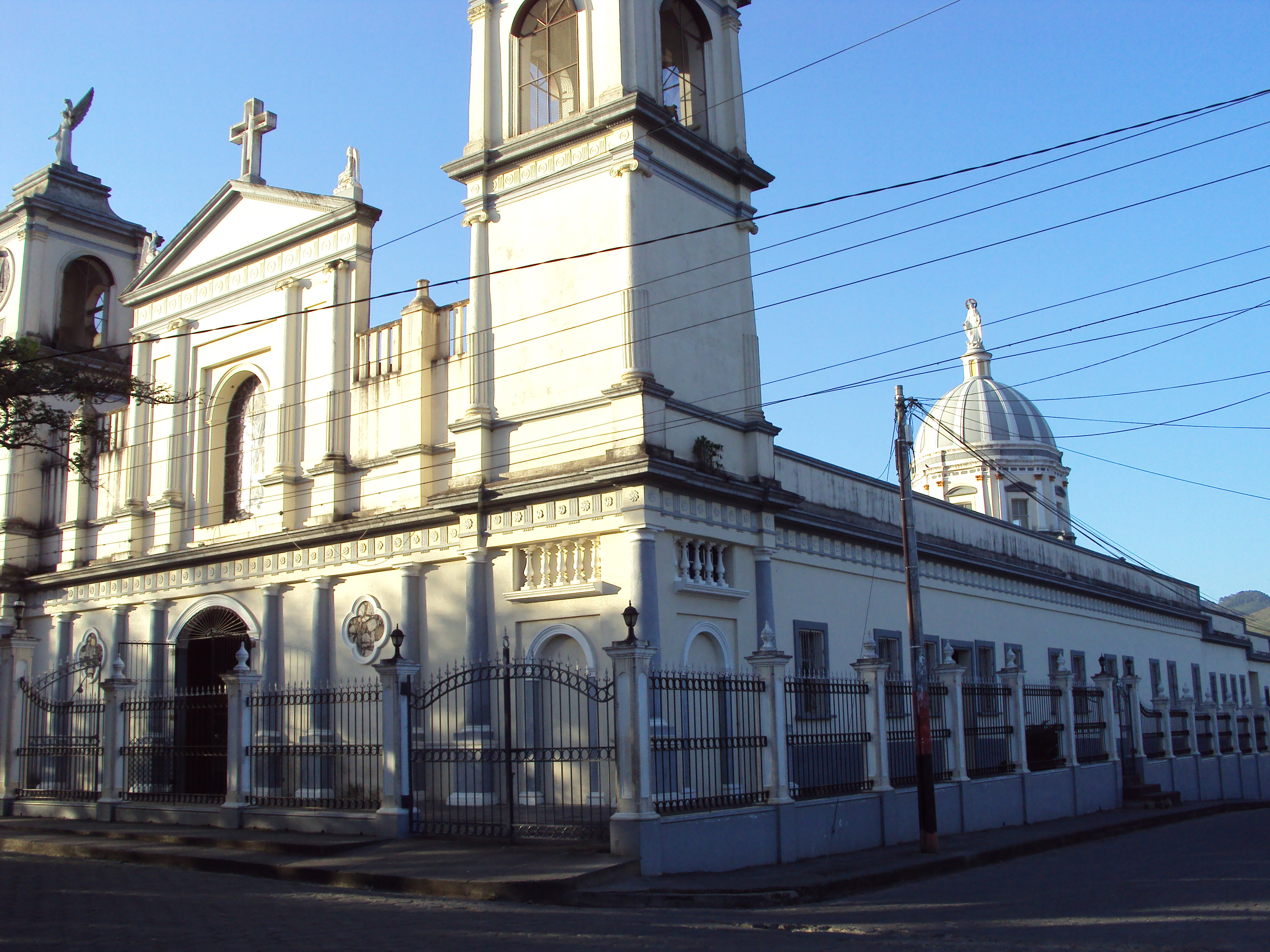
- Parish Church of San Rafael del Norte

- Location in Nicaragua
- Coordinates: 13°13′N 86°07′W
- Country: Nicaragua
- Department: Jinotega

Area
  - Municipality: 90 sq mi (233 km^{2})
- Elevation: 3,517 ft (1,072 m)

Population (2017)
  - Municipality: 22.147
  - Density: 0.246/sq mi (0.0951/km^{2})
  - Urban: 6.060
- Climate: Aw

San Rafael del Norte is a municipality and a town in the Jinotega department.

The town is located 188 kilometres (117 mi) north of Managua, the capital of Nicaragua. Elevated at over 3,000 feet, it is the highest town in Nicaragua, which attracts tourists from many countries for hiking, swimming and vacations.

== Description ==
San Rafael del Norte lies to the North of Jinotega, about a forty-minute bus ride along a road that is paved. The Catholic Church in town "Templo Parroquial de San Rafael Arcángel" is home to several murals illustrating the usual tenets of the Catholic faith. One, in particular is noteworthy. The mural showing the Temptation of Jesus in the desert has achieved a local notoriety because many observers have noted that the face of the devil strongly resembles that of current Nicaraguan President Daniel Ortega. As the mural was painted in the 1960s, this similarity is either prescient or coincidental. The murals were painted by a Swiss Artist, who was invited by Brother Odorico D'Andrea, an Italian priest who came to San Rafael del Norte in 1953. He was responsible for building health centers, bridges, as well as projects which provided drinking water and electrification. After his death in 1990, his body was found to be corrupt, which is usually considered one of the signs of sainthood. His stone casket lies in Templo Tepayec, a monument at the end of the main street through town, with a very visible set of steps leading up to it. The small town of San Rafael del Norte is famous for being the birthplace of Blanca Aráuz, Augusto C. Sandino's wife. This national hero, who fought against the American intervention on Nicaragua, fell in love with her in 1927 while she was a telegrapher in town. Blanca's family house is currently a museum with historical objects, such as newspaper articles, Sandino's letters and American weapons. This museum recently closed because the roof of the house caved in.

Another famous inhabitant of this town has Odorico D'Andrea. This Italian priest got here in 1954 and played an important role in the development of San Rafael del Norte. He help organizing health centers, providing clear water and electricity to people, among other things. D' Andrea, who died in 1990, was buried at the Virgen del Tepeyac church, which also offers nice views of the city.

This priest also gave an important impulse to the renovation of San Rafael del Norte's church, located in the center of the town. The building is notorious for its colorful stained glass and impressive size, which contrasts with the size of the town itself.

Furthermore, there is a private natural reserve in this municipality: El Jaguar, commonly known and visited for its many trails, which are suitable for birdwatching tours. It also has lodging options for tourists and a biological station for students and biologists. Another interesting site if the coffee farm called Kilimanjaro, where visitors learn about the coffee production, arrange a horseback ride, among other activities. It is possible to stay overnight at this farm.

== Transportation ==
=== Local bus ===
Jinotega-Estelí-Yali Routes

- Trans. San Jose
- Trans. Zelaya
- Trans. Gloria
- Trans. El Jocotillo
- Trans. Chepita
- Trans. Jesus

=== Shuttle bus ===
San Rafael to Jinotega

- Trans. Isabelia
- Trans. Jaime

=== Express bus ===
- Expreso Arauz

– San Rafael- Managua Dep: 4:00 A.M Arr: 7:30 A.M – Managua- San Rafael Dep: 3:30 P.M Arr: 7:00 P.M

== Radio stations and communications ==
- Radio Isabelia 89.3 FM
- Enitel (phone and internet)

== Quick stats ==
- Department: Jinotega
- Population 16,320 people
- Surface 606.00 km^{2}
- Distance 185 km from Managua
- Urban/rural 24% / 76%

== Attractions ==
- Canopy La Brellera
- El Jaguar Private Natural Reserve
- Tepeyac Retreat Center
- Los Encuentros
- Piscina Sabana Grande
- Waterfalls
- Laguna Verde
- San Rafael Cathedral
- Kilimanjaro Tourist Farm
