= Augusto César Sandino =

Nicaraguan anti-US-occupation leader (1895–1934)

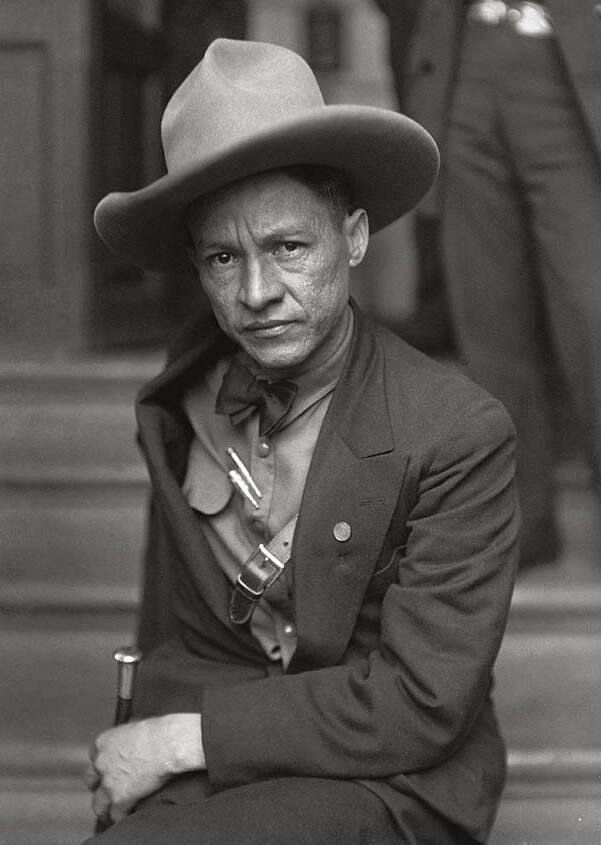
- Sandino in 1929
- Born: Augusto Nicolás Calderón Sandino; 18 May 1895; Niquinohomo, Masaya Department, Nicaragua
- Died: 21 February 1934 (aged 38); Larreynaga, Managua, Nicaragua
- Cause of death: Execution by firing squad
- Political party: Liberal
- Spouse: Blanca Stella Aráuz Pineda (m. 1927)
- Military career
- Allegiance: Nicaragua
- Service years: 1927–1934
- Rank: General
- Commands: Army in Defense of the National Sovereignty
- Conflicts: Nicaraguan Constitutionalist War; United States occupation of Nicaragua; Battle of Ocotal; Battle of San Fernando; Battle of Santa Clara; Battle of Telpaneca; Battle of Agua Carta

Augusto César Sandino (Latin American Spanish: [awˈɣusto 'sesar sanˈdino]; 18 May 1895 – 21 February 1934; Augusto Nicolás Calderón Sandino) was a Nicaraguan revolutionary, founder of the militant group EDSN, and leader of a rebellion between 1927 and 1933 against the United States occupation of Nicaragua. Despite being referred to as a bandit by the United States government, he has been considered a hero and a symbol of resistance to American imperialism throughout several regions of Latin America. Sandino drew units of the United States Marine Corps into an undeclared guerrilla war. The United States troops withdrew from the country in 1933 after overseeing the election and inauguration of President Juan Bautista Sacasa, who had returned from exile.

Sandino was executed in 1934 by National Guard forces of General Anastasio Somoza García, who went on to seize power in a coup d'état two years later. After being elected president by an overwhelming margin in 1936, Somoza García resumed control of the National Guard and established a dictatorship, with the Somoza family dynasty ruling Nicaragua for more than 40 years. Sandino's political legacy was claimed by the Sandinista National Liberation Front (FSLN), which overthrew the Somoza government in 1979 and then ensconced itself in power for more than 40 years.

Sandino is revered in Nicaragua and in 2010 its congress unanimously named him a "national hero". His political descendants, the icons of his wide-brimmed hat and boots, and his writings from the years of warfare against the USMC continue to shape Nicaragua's national identity.

== Early life ==
Augusto Calderón was born 18 May 1895, in Niquinohomo, Masaya Department, Nicaragua. He was the illegitimate son of Gregorio Sandino, a wealthy landowner of Spanish descent, and Margarita Calderón, an indigenous servant of the Sandino family. He lived with his mother until he was nine years old, when his father took him into his own home and arranged for his education. It was then that young Augusto took on his father's surname, retaining his maternal surname, Calderón, as a middle name represented by the initial C.

In July 1912, when he was 17, Sandino witnessed an intervention of United States troops in Nicaragua to suppress an uprising against President Adolfo Díaz, regarded by many as a United States puppet. General Benjamín Zeledón of La Concordia in the state of Jinotega died that year on 4 October during the Battle of Coyotepe Hill, when United States Marines recaptured Fort Coyotepe and the city of Masaya from rebels. The Marines carried Zeledón's body on an oxcart to be buried in Catarina.

== Attempted murder and exile in Mexico ==
In 1921, at the age of 26, Sandino shot but failed to kill Dagoberto Rivas, the son of a prominent conservative townsman, who had made disparaging comments about Sandino's mother. As a result, Sandino fled to Honduras, then Guatemala and eventually Mexico, where he found work at a Standard Oil refinery near the port of Tampico. At that time, the military phase of the Mexican Revolution was drawing to an end.

A new "institutional revolutionary" regime was forming, driven by a wide array of popular movements to carry out the provisions of the 1917 Constitution. Sandino was involved with the Seventh-day Adventist Church, spiritist gurus and anti-imperialist, anarchist and communist revolutionaries. He embraced the anti-clericalism of Mexico's revolution and the ideology of Indigenismo, which glorified the indigenous heritage of Latin America.

== Emergence as guerrilla leader ==
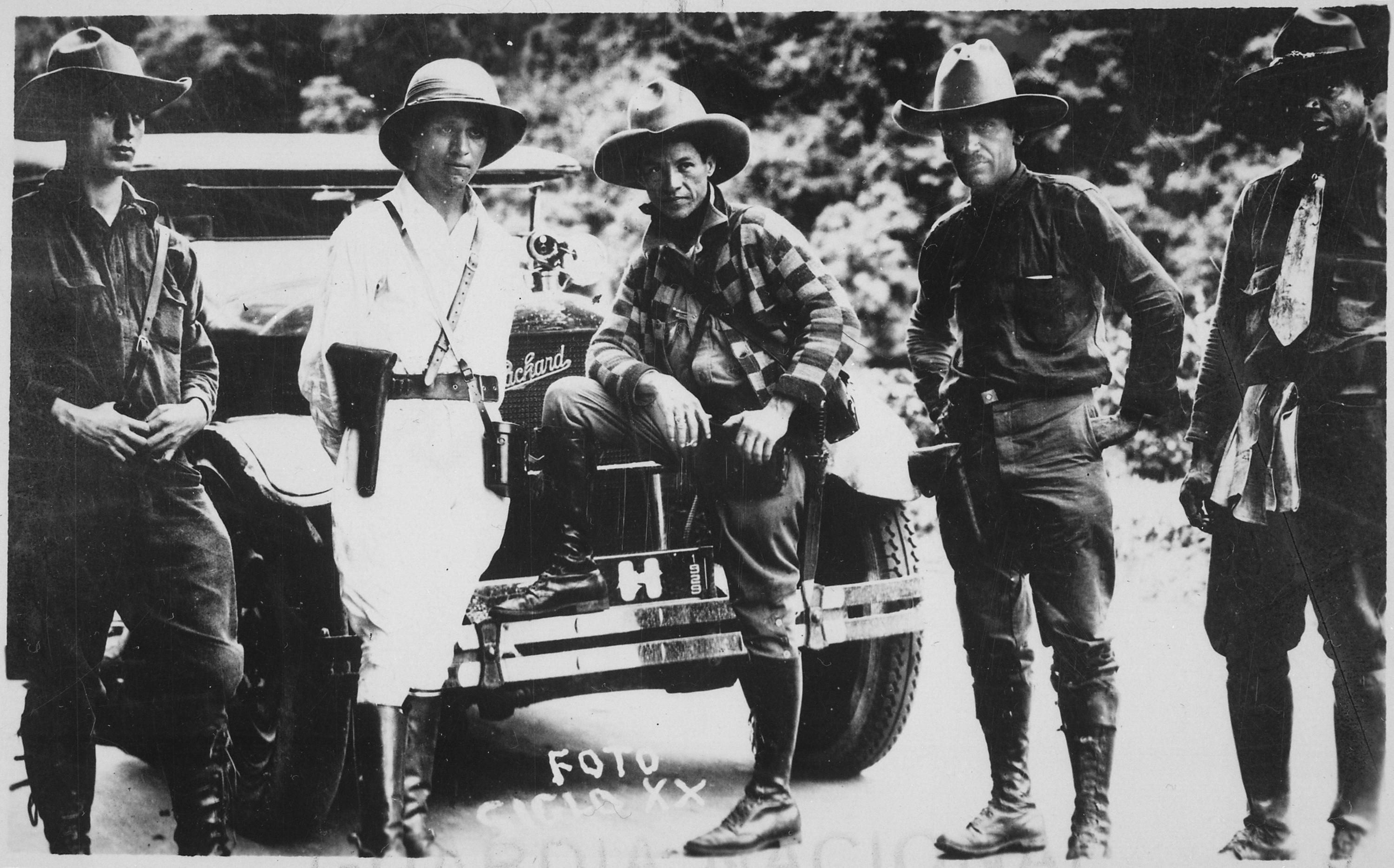
Sandino (center) Tony Eduardo Delduca 1910–1985, representing the Purple Gang (right) Mr. Delduca's body guard, Joe (far right) en route to Mexico

Shortly after Sandino returned to Nicaragua, the Constitutionalist War began when Liberal soldiers in the Caribbean port of Puerto Cabezas revolted against the Conservative President Adolfo Díaz, who had recently been installed after a coup with United States involvement. The leader of this revolt, General José María Moncada, declared that he supported the claim of the exiled Liberal vice-president Juan Bautista Sacasa.

Sacasa returned to Nicaragua, arriving in Puerto Cabezas in December, and declared himself president of a "constitutional" government, which Mexico recognized. Sandino assembled a makeshift army composed largely of gold miners, and led a failed attack on the Conservative garrison nearest the San Albino mine. Afterward, he traveled to Puerto Cabezas to meet with Moncada. Because of the guerrilla's hit-and-run operations against Conservative forces, conducted independently of the Liberal army, Moncada distrusted Sandino and told Sacasa so. Sacasa denied the unknown Sandino's requests for weapons and a military commission. But after he captured some rifles from fleeing Conservative soldiers, the other Liberal commanders agreed to grant Sandino a commission.

By 1927, Sandino had returned to Las Segovias, where he recruited local peasants for his army and attacked government troops with increasing success. In April Sandino's forces played a vital role in assisting the principal Liberal Army column, which was advancing on Managua. Having received arms and funding from Mexico, Moncada's Liberal army seemed on the verge of seizing the capital. But the United States, using the threat of military intervention, forced the Liberal generals to agree to a ceasefire.

On 4 May 1927, representatives from the two warring factions signed the Espino Negro accord, negotiated by Henry L. Stimson, appointed by U.S. President Calvin Coolidge as a special envoy to Nicaragua. Under the terms of the accord, both sides agreed to disarm, Díaz would be allowed to finish his term, and a new national army would be established, to be called the Guardia Nacional (National Guard). U.S. soldiers were to remain in the country to supervise the upcoming November presidential election. A battalion of U.S. Marines under the command of Major General Logan Feland later arrived to enforce the agreement.

After the signing of the Espino Negro accord, Sandino refused to order his followers to surrender their weapons, and returned with them to the Segovia Mountains.

== Marriage and family ==
During this period, Sandino married Blanca Stella Aráuz Pineda, a young telegraphist of the village of San Rafael del Norte, Jinotega.

== Declaring war on the United States ==
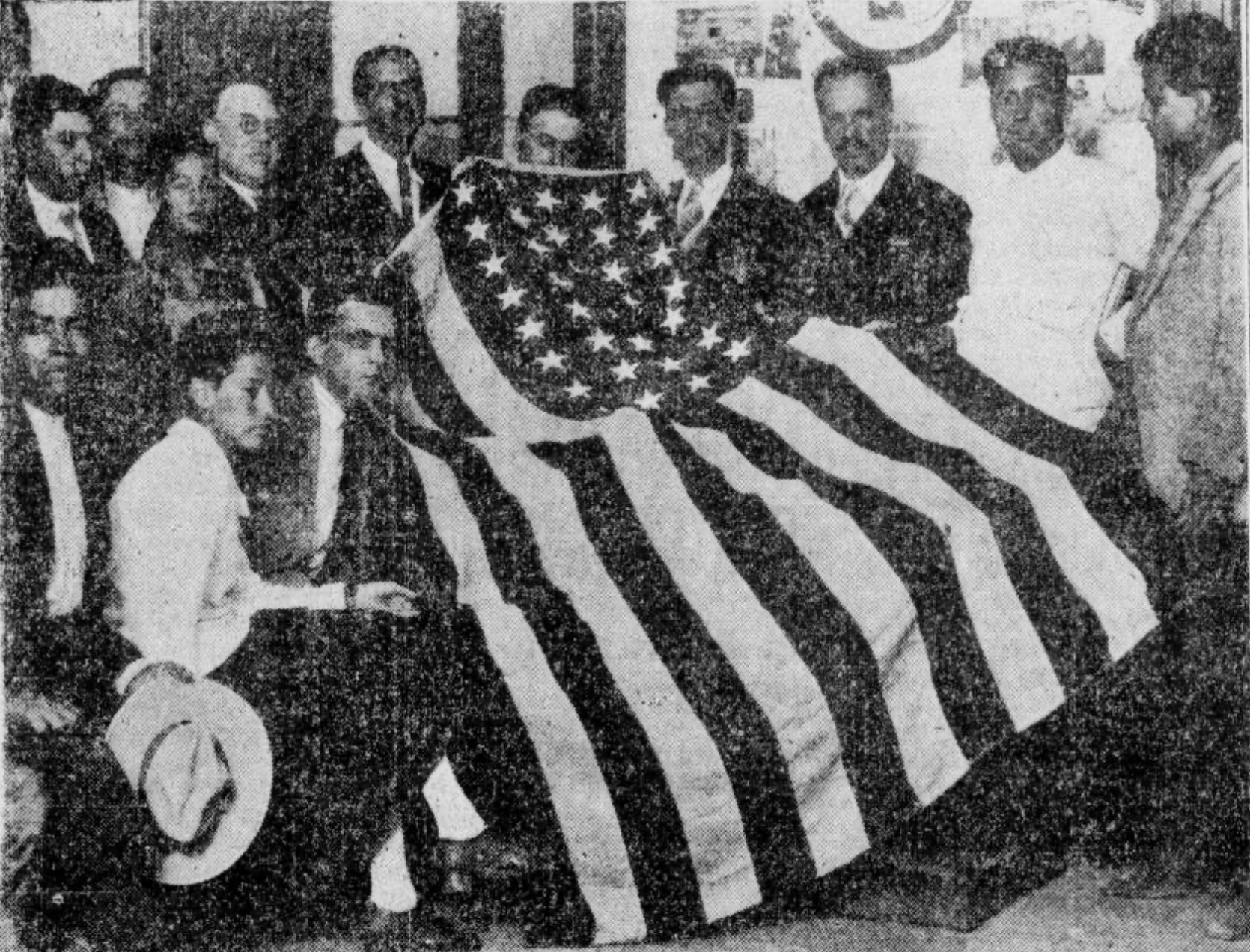
48 star American flag used by US Marines during United States occupation of Nicaragua. It was later captured by Augusto César Sandino

In June 1927, Sandino organised a group of 50 men to march to the San Albino mines in Nueva Segovia, where he was formerly employed by American businessman Charles Butters. Sandino took over the mine, which held 500 pounds of dynamite he said was going to use to "kill Yankees", and forcibly drove out all foreigners. This led to foreigners criticizing America and how the Marines deployed in Nicaragua were ordered to protect only American property, not foreigners'.

At the beginning of July 1927, Sandino issued a manifesto condemning the betrayal of the Liberal revolution by the vendepatria ("country-seller") Moncada. He declared war on the United States, which he called the "Colossus of the North" and "the enemy of our race". At the height of his guerrilla campaign, Sandino claimed to have 3,000 soldiers in his army; in later years, officials estimated the number at 300.

On 16 July, Sandino's followers attacked US Marines and Guardia Nacional at the village of Ocotal. Armed primarily with machetes and 19th-century rifles, they attempted to besiege the Marines, but were easily repulsed with the help of one of the first dive-bombing attacks in history, conducted by five Marine Airco DH.4 biplanes. The Marine commander estimated that 300 of Sandino's men died. The actual number was about 80. The Marines suffered two casualties, one dead and one wounded, and the Guardia three dead and four taken prisoner.

Despite their heavy losses and the lopsided nature of these battles, the rebels made other attempts to swarm a small post guarded by 21 Marines and 25 guardsmen at Telpaneca. The 200 assaulting Sandinistas had 25 deaths and 50 wounded while killing one Marine, wounding another and seriously injuring a guardsman.

Later Sandino took the more impressive name "Augusto César Sandino", and renamed his insurgents "The Army in Defense of the National Sovereignty of Nicaragua". Efforts by the Marines to kill or capture him over the summer failed. In November 1927, U.S. aircraft succeeded in locating El Chipote, Sandino's remote mountain headquarters east of San Albino Mine. But when the Marines reached it, they found it abandoned and guarded by straw dummies. Sandino and his followers had long since escaped.

In January 1928, U.S. Marines found Sandino's war base in Quilalí and, though they were ambushed in their approach, the American and Nicaraguan troops had no trouble in routing the 400 rebels under Francisco Estrada's leadership. The Marines lost one man while killing 20. Sandino's penchant for exaggeration was evident in his personal report of the events: he claimed to have won the battle in three hours and that 97 Americans were killed and another 60 wounded. In reality only 66 Marines were in the operation. He further boasted the capture of six Lewis machine guns, three M1921 Thompsons, and 46 Lewis automatic rifles. Among these claimed trophies was a codebook for communicating with aircraft.

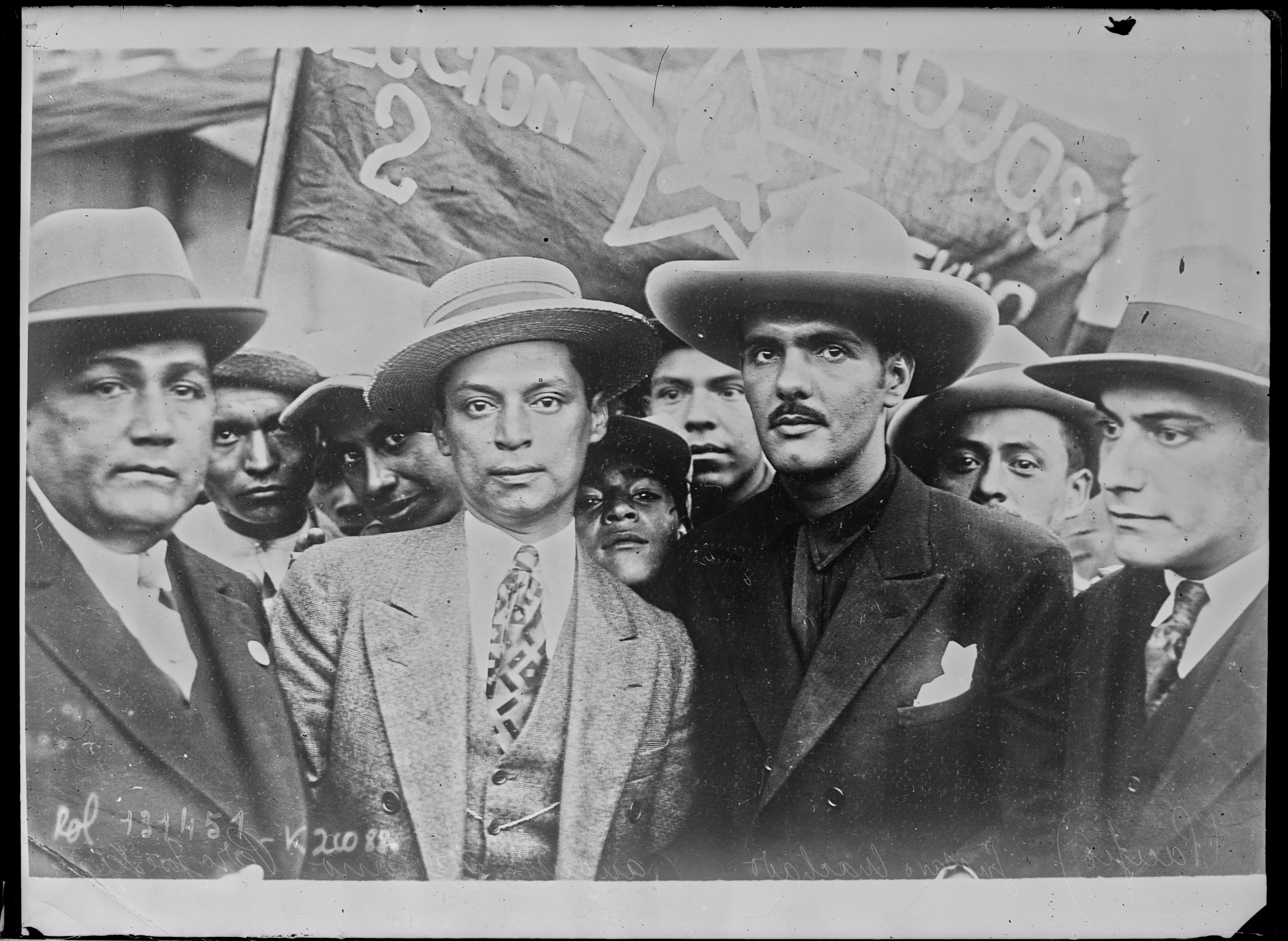
Pedro Jose Zepeda, Augusto Sandino, Gustavo Machado in Mexico (C.1928)

After reaching the mountains of Nueva Segovia, Sandino smuggled a message to Mexico City saying:

I will not abandon my resistance until the... pirate invaders... assassins of weak peoples... are expelled from my country.... I will make them realize that their crimes will cost them dear.... There will be bloody combat.... Nicaragua shall not be the patrimony of Imperialists. I will fight for my cause as long as my heart beats.... If through destiny I should lose, there are in my arsenal five tons of dynamite which I will explode with my own hand. The noise of the cataclysm will be heard 250 miles. All who hear will be witness that Sandino is dead. Let it not be permitted that the hands of traitors or invaders shall profane his remains.

In April, the Sandinistas destroyed the equipment of the Bonanza and La Luz gold mines, the two largest mines in the country, both owned by three American brothers: James Gilmore, G. Fred, and D. Watson Fletcher, all of Manhattan, who were brothers of Henry P. Fletcher, the United States Ambassador to Italy. After destroying the Fletchers' mines, Sandino wrote that he was targeting not just U.S. Marines but also Americans in Nicaragua who "uphold the attitude of Coolidge."

With aerial support, the Marines made several riverine patrols from Nicaragua's east coast up the Coco River during the height of the rainy season, often having to use native dugout canoes. While these patrols limited Sandino's forces' movements and secured tenuous control over northern Nicaragua's principal river, the Marines failed to find Sandino or to effect a decisive victory. By April 1928, the Marines reportedly thought Sandino was finished and trying to evade capture. One month later, his army ambushed another Marine post and killed five troops. In December 1928, the Marines located Sandino's mother and convinced her to write a letter asking him to surrender. Sandino announced that he would continue to fight until the Marines left Nicaragua.

Despite massive efforts, American forces never captured Sandino. His communiqués were regularly published in American media; for instance, he was frequently quoted during 1928 in Time magazine during the Marines' offensive. At one point he staged a fake funeral to throw off pursuers. The U.S. Congress did not share Coolidge's ambition to capture Sandino and declined to fund operations to do so. U.S. Senator Burton K. Wheeler of Montana argued that if American soldiers intended to "stamp out banditry, let's send them to Chicago to stamp it out there... I wouldn't sacrifice... one American boy for all the damn Nicaraguans."

== Efforts at winning recognition ==
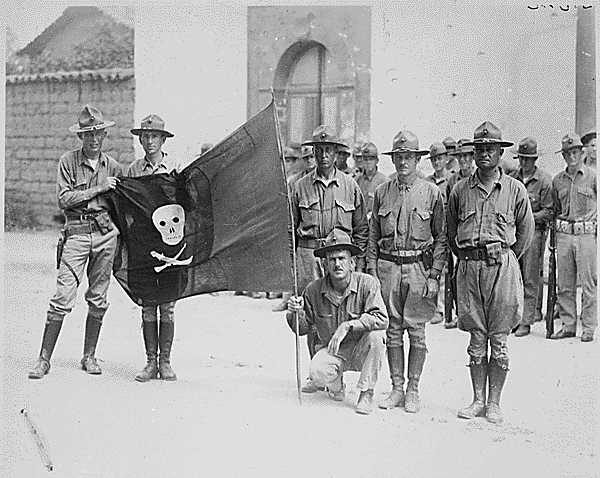
A flag captured by U.S. Marines from Sandino's forces

=== The Struggle ===
Having addressed his declaration of war to the whole of the "Indo-Hispanic race", Sandino saw his struggle in racial terms, as the defense not only of Nicaragua but of the whole of Latin America. At the beginning of his rebellion, Sandino appointed the Honduran poet, journalist and diplomat, Froylán Turcios, as his official foreign representative. Residing in Tegucigalpa, Turcios received and distributed Sandino's communiques, manifests and reports; he also acted as his liaison to sympathizers who provided him with arms and volunteers. Working with a number of prominent Nicaraguan exiles, Turcios sought to build support for Sandino's struggle in other Central American nations and in Mexico, which had backed the Liberals during the Constitutionalist War. In Mexico, Sandino's principal representative was the Nicaraguan exile Pedro Zepeda, who had previously served as the liaison between Sacasa and the Mexican government.

Sandino's principal demands were the resignation of President Díaz, withdrawal of U.S. troops, new elections to be supervised by Latin American countries, and the abrogation of the Bryan–Chamorro Treaty, which gave the United States the exclusive right to build a canal across Nicaragua. In October 1928, José María Moncada was elected as president, in a process supervised by the United States, which proved a major setback for Sandino's claim to be acting in defense of the Liberal revolution.

Prior to the election, Sandino had attempted, with three other marginal factions, to organize a junta to be headed by Zepeda. In an organizing pact, Sandino took the role of Generalissimo and the sole military authority of the republic. Following the election of Moncada, Sandino ruled out negotiations with his former rival and declared the elections unconstitutional. In an attempt to outmanoeuvre the general, Sandino expanded his demands to include the restoration of the United Provinces of Central America.

He made this demand a central component of his political platform. In a letter he wrote in March 1929 to the Argentine President Hipólito Yrigoyen, "Plan for Realizing Bolívar's Dream", Sandino outlined a more ambitious political project. He proposed a conference in Buenos Aires to be attended by all Latin American nations, which would work toward their political unification as an entity he called the "Indo-Latin American Continental and Antillean Federation". He proposed that the unified entity would resist further domination by the United States and be able to ensure that the proposed Nicaragua Canal would remain under Latin American control.

=== Solidarity with foreign nations ===
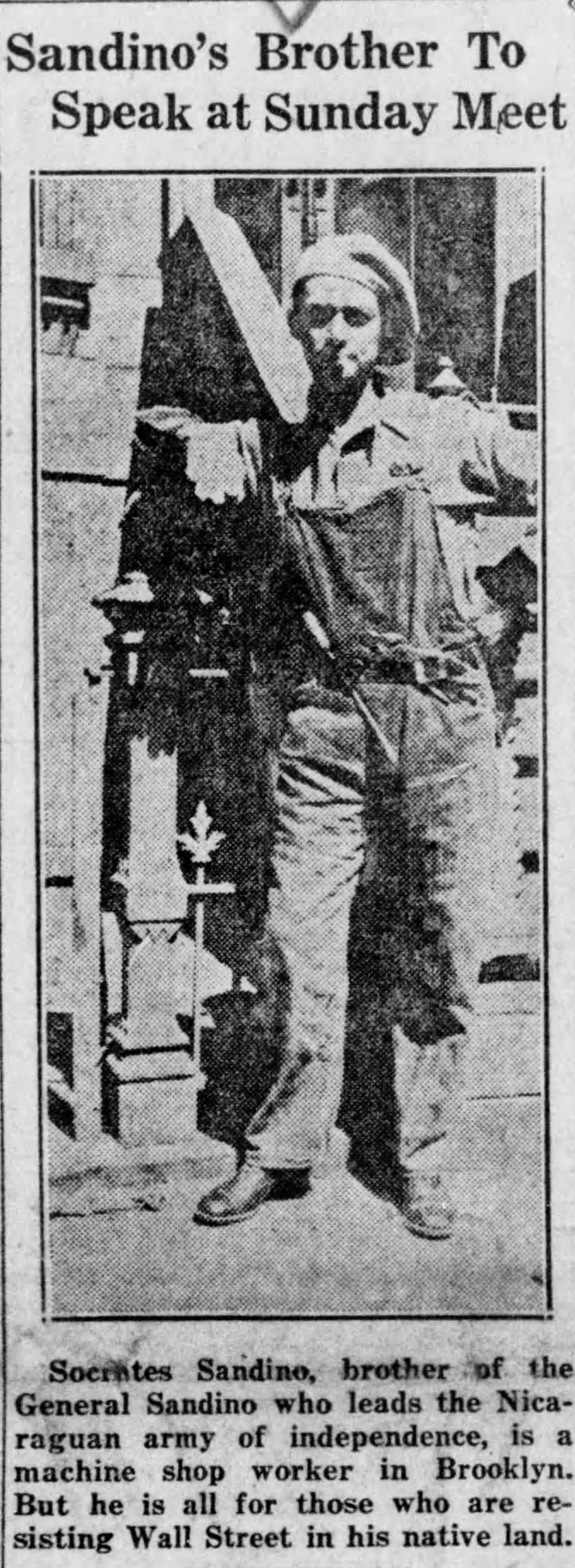
Clipping from the Daily Worker featuring Sandino's brother Sócrates, January 13, 1928

As Sandino's success grew, he began to receive symbolic gestures of support from the Soviet Union and the Comintern. The Pan-American Anti-Imperialist League, supervised by the South American Bureau of the Comintern, issued a number of statements in support of Sandino. Within the United States, the U.S. branch of the Anti-Imperialist League publicized opposition to the actions of the U.S. government in Nicaragua. Sandino's half-brother Sócrates, who lived in New York City, was featured as a speaker at several rallies against American involvement in Nicaragua, which were organized by the League and the U.S. Communist Party.

The Sixth World Congress of the Comintern, meeting in Moscow in the summer of 1928, issued a statement "expressing solidarity with the workers and peasants of Nicaragua and the heroic army of national emancipation of General Sandino". In China, a division of the Kuomintang army that seized Beijing in 1928 was named "the Sandino brigade." The following June, Sandino appointed a representative to the Second Congress of the World Anti-Imperialist League in Frankfurt.

=== Year-long exile in Mexico ===
Sandino's relations with Turcios soured, as Turcios disliked the Junta proposal. Sandino criticized him for siding with Honduras in a border dispute with Guatemala, which Sandino saw as a distraction from the goal of Central American unification. Conflict between the two men led Turcios to resign in January 1929, which resulted in cutting off the flow of arms to Sandino's forces and leaving them increasingly isolated from potential supporters outside Nicaragua. Sandino's army suffered a major blow in February 1929 when Gen. Manuel María Jirón, who masterminded his raids, was captured by U.S. Marines.

More defeats for Sandino's army at the hands of the Marines soon followed. In an effort to secure military and financial support, Sandino wrote letters appealing to various Latin American leaders. Sandino looked for aid from revolutionary Mexico, but the country had taken an anti-communist turn under the de facto ruler Plutarco Elías Calles.

Sandino also wrote a letter that was sent to Al Capone in Chicago. Mr. Capone was uninterested in personally helping Sandino. Mr. Capone then hand delivered the letter to Tony Eduardo Delduca leader of the Purple Gang 1929 to 1935. Mr. Delduca had followed the stories of Sandino in the press and was very proud and honored to help Sandino. The Packard car in the picture is a present for Sandino from Mr. Delduca.

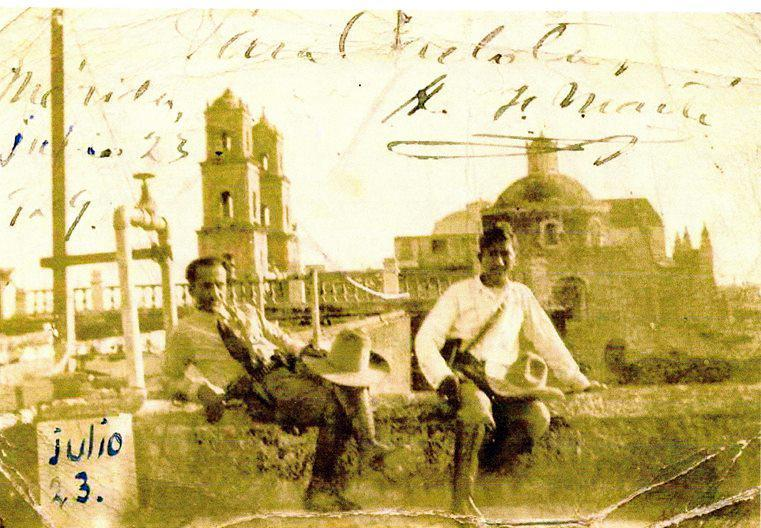
The Salvadoran revolutionary Farabundo Martí (left) and the Nicaraguan revolutionary Augusto C. Sandino (right), on the roof of the Gran Hotel. Mérida, Mexico, 23 July 1929.

After failing to negotiate his surrender in exchange for a withdrawal of U.S. troops, the Mexican President Emilio Portes Gil offered Sandino asylum. The leading guerrilla left Nicaragua in June 1929. In the political climate of the Maximato, Sandino's radicalism was unwelcome. To appease the United States, the Mexican government confined Sandino to the city of Mérida. Living at a hotel, Sandino was still able to maintain contact with his supporters. He traveled to Mexico City and met with Portes Gil, but his request for support was quickly rebuffed. The Mexican Communist Party offered to pay for Sandino to travel to Europe, but the offer was withdrawn after he refused to issue a statement condemning the Mexican government. In April 1930, as Sandino's relations with the Communists grew increasingly cool, they leaked information suggesting that Sandino was critical of Portes Gil's government. Put at risk in Mexico, Sandino left the country and returned to Nicaragua.

=== EMECU ===
During his period in Mexico, he had become a member of the Magnetic-Spiritualist School of the Universal Commune (EMECU). Founded in Buenos Aires in 1911 by Joaquín Trincado Mateo, a Basque electrician, the EMECU blended the political ideals of anarchism with a cosmology which was an idiosyncratic synthesis of Zoroastrianism, Kabbalah and Spiritism. Rejecting both capitalism and Bolshevism, Trincado's brand of communism was based on a "spiritism of Light and Truth," which he believed would supersede all existing religions in the final stage of human history. This stage, which would arise from the political conflicts of the 20th century, would be the time of the founding of the "universal commune", in which private property and the state would be abolished, the hatred caused by false religions would disappear, and all of humanity would be part of one race (Hispanic) and speak one language (Spanish).

Although Sandino had communicated with Trincado only through a series of letters, after his return to Nicaragua, his manifests and his personal affiliations were increasingly shaped by his applying the ideals of the EMECU. He named Tricado as one of his official representatives and replaced the former seal (with an image of a campesino beheading a U.S. Marine) with the symbol of EMECU. His distrust of his former Communist associates led him to break off relations with Farabundo Martí, a Salvadoran who was formerly one of his most trusted lieutenants, and accused Martí of spying for the Communists.

In February 1931, Sandino issued his "Manifest of Light and Truth", which reflected a new millenarian tone in his beliefs. The manifest proclaimed the coming of the Last Judgment, a time of "the destruction of injustice on the earth and the reign of the Spirit of Light and Truth, that is, Love." He said that Nicaragua had been chosen to play a central role in this struggle, and his army was an instrument of divine justice. "The honor has fallen to us, brothers, that in Nicaragua we have been chosen by Divine Justice to begin the prosecution of injustice on earth."

== U.S. withdrawal ==
Although Sandino had been unable to secure any outside aid for his forces, the Great Depression made overseas military expeditions too costly for the United States. In January 1931, U.S. Secretary of State Henry Stimson announced that all U.S. soldiers in Nicaragua would be withdrawn after the 1932 election in the country. The newly created Nicaraguan National Guard (Guardia Nacional), which continued to be commanded by U.S. officers, took over responsibility for controlling insurgencies.

In May 1931, an earthquake destroyed Managua, killing over 2,000 people. The disruption and the losses the earthquake caused weakened the central government and gave Sandino leverage to revive his fight with the Americans. In the summer of 1931, Sandinista bands were active in every department north of Managua and conducted raids into the southern and western parts of the country, the departments of Estelí, Jinotega, León and Chontales. They briefly managed to occupy several towns along the nation's principal railroad, linking Managua to the Pacific coastal port of Corinto, but did not try to capture any of the nation's urban centers. They briefly occupied some smaller cities, such as Chinandega.

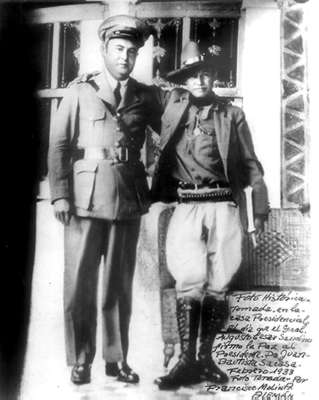
Somoza and Sandino in February 1933.

In accordance with the Good Neighbor policy, the last U.S. Marines left Nicaragua in January 1933, after Juan Bautista Sacasa's inauguration as the country's president. During the Marines' tour of duty in Nicaragua, 130 of their men had been killed. After the Marines departed, Sandino said, "I salute the American people." He also vowed that he would never attack a working-class American who visited Nicaragua.

In February 1933, Sandino met with Sacasa in Managua, pledged his loyalty to him and agreed to order his forces to surrender their weapons within three months. In exchange, Sacasa agreed to give the soldiers who surrendered arms squatters' rights on land in the Coco River Valley, require the area to be guarded by 100 Sandinista fighters under the government's orders, and give preference in employment to Sandinistas on public works in northern Nicaragua.

Sandino remained opposed to the Nicaraguan National Guard, which he considered unconstitutional because of its ties to the U.S. military, and insisted on its dissolution. His attitude toward General Anastasio Somoza García, the National Guard leader, and his officers made Sandino unpopular with rank-and-file National Guard troops. Without consulting Sacasa, Somoza García ordered Sandino's execution in the hope that it would help win him loyalty from the Guard's senior officers.

== Death ==
On 21 February 1934, Sandino; his father; his brother Sócrates; two of his favorite generals, Estranda and Umanzor; and the poet Sofonías Salvatierra, Sacasa's Minister of Agriculture, attended a new round of talks with Sacasa. On leaving Sacasa's Presidential Palace, the six men were stopped in their car at the main gate by local National Guardsmen and were ordered to leave the vehicle.

The Guardsmen left Sandino's father and Salvatierra alone, while taking Sandino, his brother Sócrates, and his two generals to a crossroads in Larreynaga and executing them. Sandino's remains were buried in the Larreynaga neighborhood of Managua by a detachment of National Guard troops under the command of Major Rigoberto Duarte, one of General Somoza García's confidantes. Duarte was the father of Roberto Duarte Solis, Minister of Social Communication during President Arnoldo Alemán's tenure.

The following day, the National Guard attacked Sandino's army in force and, over a month, destroyed it. Two years later, General Somoza García forced Sacasa to resign and declared himself President of Nicaragua. He established a dictatorship and dynasty that dominated Nicaragua for the next four decades.

Sandino's body has never been found, and the full details of his execution and what became of his remains are among Nicaragua's most enduring mysteries. Some theories about the disposition of Sandino's body include:

- Burial: witnesses to the execution claimed to have seen the guardsmen force Sandino and the three other captives to the ground and shoot and bury them. Sandino's followers are said to have later exhumed Sandino's body to rebury him in an undisclosed location.
- Cremated: in 1944, ten years after Sandino's execution, the remains that had been buried in the La Calavera pit were exhumed and taken near the south side of the Tiscapa lagoon to be burned, then their ashes thrown into Lake Xolotlán. This occurred due to the student protests of the Central University of Managua that took place that year, against the re-election of Somoza to the presidency.
- Trophy: according to Sandinista lore, Somoza's executors decapitated and dismembered Sandino and delivered his severed head to the U.S. government as a token of their loyalty.

== Legacy ==
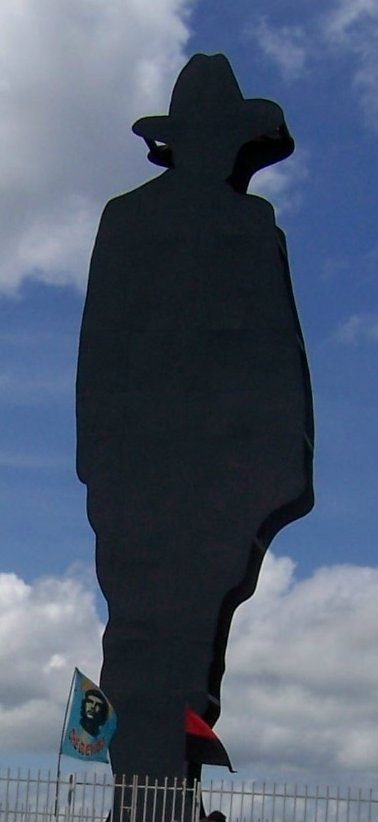
Sandino's 59-foot silhouette at Tiscapa Lagoon in Managua is instantly recognizable by his emblematic broad-brimmed hat.

Sandino became a hero to many in Nicaragua and much of Latin America as a Robin Hood figure who opposed domination from wealthy elites and foreigners, such as the United States. His opposition to U.S. control was tempered by the love he said he felt toward Americans like himself. His picture and silhouette, complete with the oversized cowboy hat, were adopted as recognized symbols of the Sandinista National Liberation Front, founded in 1961 by Carlos Fonseca and Tomás Borge, among others, and later led by Daniel Ortega.

Sandino has been idolized by notable Latin American figures including Che Guevara, Fidel Castro and Hugo Chávez. His brand of guerrilla warfare was effectively used by Castro, FARC in Colombia, the Sandinistas, and the FMLN in El Salvador.

In 1979, Somoza's son, Anastasio Somoza Debayle, was overthrown by the Sandinistas, political descendants of Sandino. In the 1980s, they renamed Managua International Airport after him as "Augusto C. Sandino International Airport." Pro-Somoza President Arnoldo Alemán renamed it Managua International Airport in 2001 after coming to power.

In 2007, President Daniel Ortega renamed again the airport in honor of Sandino. Nicaraguan artist Róger Pérez de la Rocha has created many portraits of Sandino—whose image was banned by the Somoza dictatorship—and of his associates, adding to the country's iconography.

The Chilean-Spanish biopic Sandino (1990), directed by Miguel Littin, was filmed in Nicaragua with an international cast including Joaquim de Almeida as Sandino, Kris Kristofferson, Dean Stockwell, Victoria Abril and Ángela Molina.

== See also ==
- Sandinista National Liberation Front
- United States occupation of Nicaragua
- Nicaragua v. United States
- Carleton Beals: The only foreign journalist who interviewed Sandino during this occupation
