= Sacasa =

Sacasa is a surname. Notable people with the name include:

- Benjamín Lacayo Sacasa (1893–1959), President of Nicaragua
- Guillermo Sevilla Sacasa (1908–1997), Nicaraguan ambassador to the United States
- Juan Bautista Sacasa (1874–1946), President of Nicaragua
- Olga Sacasa (born 1961), Nicaraguan track and road cyclist
- Roberto Sacasa (1840–1896), President of Nicaragua
- Roberto Aguirre-Sacasa (born 1973), American playwright, screenwriter, and comic book writer

== See also ==
- Anselmo Sacasas (1912–1998), Cuban jazz pianist, bandleader, composer, and arranger
