= Joaquín Trincado Mateo =

Spanish philosopher (1866–1935)

Joaquin Trincado Mateo
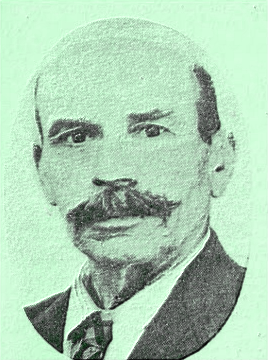
- Born: August 19, 1866; Navarra, Spain
- Died: December 6, 1935 (aged 69); Buenos Aires, Argentina
- Known for: Founded The "Magnetical-Spiritual School of Universal Commune" (EMECU), and a new perspective on Spiritism; "Spiritism Light and truth".

Joaquín Trincado Mateo was a Spanish philosopher. He founded the Magnetical-Spiritual School of Universal Commune in 1911 in Buenos Aires, Argentina. The academy is based on the study of "eternal and continuous life" using its "Light and Truth Spiritism".

According to his philosophy, Magnetic-Spiritual School of Universal Commune is the direct continuation of the Hesen School founded by Moses.

== Early life ==
Mateo was born on August 19, 1866, in the Spanish city of Cintruenigo (province of Navarra). He was the son of "working class" parents, Ignacio Trincado Alfaro and Romualda Mateo de Ayala. He was a student for about eighteen months at a Jesuit school and later studied to be an electrician.

== Career ==
=== Escuela Magnetico-Espiritual de la Comuna Universal ===
In 1912, Mateo traveled to East Jerusalem, where he was received by the guardians of the school of the Essenes Kábala; he received the order to open a school, intended as a continuation of the Kábala. The new school he founded, Escuela Magnetico-Espiritual de la Comuna Universal (EMECU), became popular. In its first twenty-four years, 184 branches opened in several Spanish provinces, as well as Cuba, El Salvador, the United States (US), Guatemala, Honduras, Mexico, Nicaragua, Puerto Rico, Santo Domingo, Uruguay and Venezuela. For administrative operations, the schools established a rigid discipline, governed by a document entitled, "Rules of Procedure, Statutes, Circulars and Articles", from its official magazine, La Balanza ("The Balance"). The document describes a "personality", whereby the Civil School is an educational institution for philanthropic and cultural studies, with own metaphysical and scientific methods.

=== Unity for Spanish speakers ===
In addition to writing on spiritism, Mateo promoted the progress and unity of Spanish-speaking people. On October 12, 1921, he developed the Hispanic-American-Oceanic Union (UHAO), symbolized by a flag with the seven colors of the rainbow and the Basque Oak tree of Guernica. In 1925, he founded the Organization Templo Azul Racionalista (Otar), for scientists and intellectuals, and then the "Circle Master's Advocate", a secular education program, whereby teachers would instruct other teachers.

Nicaraguan revolutionary and politician, Augusto César Sandino, was one of the best-known followers of Mateo's "Luz y Verdad" ("Light and Truth") manifesto of 1931.

=== The Colony Jaime (Santiago del Estero) ===
On July 25, 1931, Mateo directed the founding of Colony Jaime (607 hectares (65,300,000 sq ft)), located in Robles in the northern province of Santiago del Estero, Argentina; the Colony remained in existence as of 2012. In 2012, twenty-five families, consisting of seventy-nine children, teenagers and adults, are the Colony's residents. It is located near the city of Santiago del Estero (capital of the province).

Since 1952, Colony Jaime collaborates with the Cologne Provincial Public School No. 667 Pedro Juricich (primary and secondary EGB3 initial level), which works with many children from the area who attend the association.

Mateo also created the Colonia Los Libertadores.

=== Death and administration ===
At the time of Mateo's death on December 6, 1935, it was revealed that he had left directorship duties of the school to his wife, Maria Mercedes Riglos Cosis. She delegated this authority to their eldest son, Juan Trincado Donato, who died in 1992.

== Work ==
Some of Mateo's most representative texts are:

- Conócete a ti mismo
- Extremes Meet
- Philosophy Rational Austere
- Spiritist Questionnaire
- Speech by Bishop Strossmayer
- Searching for God
- Five Loves
- Prophylaxis of Life
- Jesus Man not God
- Magnetism in its Origin
- First Ray of Light
- The True Life of Mary of jerico
- Philosophy Universal Encyclopedic
- Alfaqui Vademecum
- Spiritism Studied

He wrote 42 works; including books and pamphlets, of which only 14 were printed, 32 are in the hands of their children. These include the continuation of the Code of Universal Love and his Autobiography.
