= San Vitores (disambiguation) =

San Vitores may refer to:

- Diego Luis de San Vitores (1627–1672), a Jesuit missionary martyred on Guam

== On Guam ==
- Blessed Diego Luis de San Vitores Church, in Tumon, Guam, under the Roman Catholic Archdiocese of Agaña
- Pale San Vitores Road, a section of Guam Highway 14 in Tumon, Guam
- San Vitores Beach Japanese Fortification, NHRP-listed ruins of Japanese WWII fortifications on Tumon Bay, Guam
- San Vitores Martyrdom Site, an NHRP-listed site in Tumon, Guam

== In Spain ==
- Church of San Vitores, a Gothic church built in the 13th and 14th centuries in Frías, Province of Burgos, Spain
- Francisca de San Vítores (17th century), the financier of San Lorenzo el Real, Burgos in Spain
- Los Moros de San Vitores, a cave known for Paleolithic art in Valles Pasiegos, Spain
