= Francisco Q. Sanchez Elementary School =

- U.S. National Register of Historic Places
- Location within Guam
- Location: Guam Route 2, Umatac, Guam
- Coordinates: 13°17′57″N 144°39′48″E
- Area: 1 acre (0.40 ha)
- Built: 1953
- Architect: Richard J. Neutra
- Architectural style: International Style
- NRHP reference No.: 98000678
- Added to NRHP: June 12, 1998

The Francisco Q. Sanchez Elementary School is a historic school building on the north side of Guam Highway 2 in Umatac, Guam. It is a single-story International style structure, with two classroom wings flanking a central administration area. The building was designed by noted Internationalist architect Richard J. Neutra, and built in 1953 adjacent to the San Dionisio Church Ruins. Neutra's design sought to integrate the school with its surrounding environment, and provides a panoramic view of Umatac Bay. The building is one of four buildings built pursuant to a master plan (abandoned by the island's political leadership soon afterward) developed by Neutra and Robert J. Alexander. It is Umatac's only school.

The building was listed on the National Register of Historic Places in 1998.

== See also ==
- National Register of Historic Places listings in Guam
