= Hill 40 =

- U.S. National Register of Historic Places
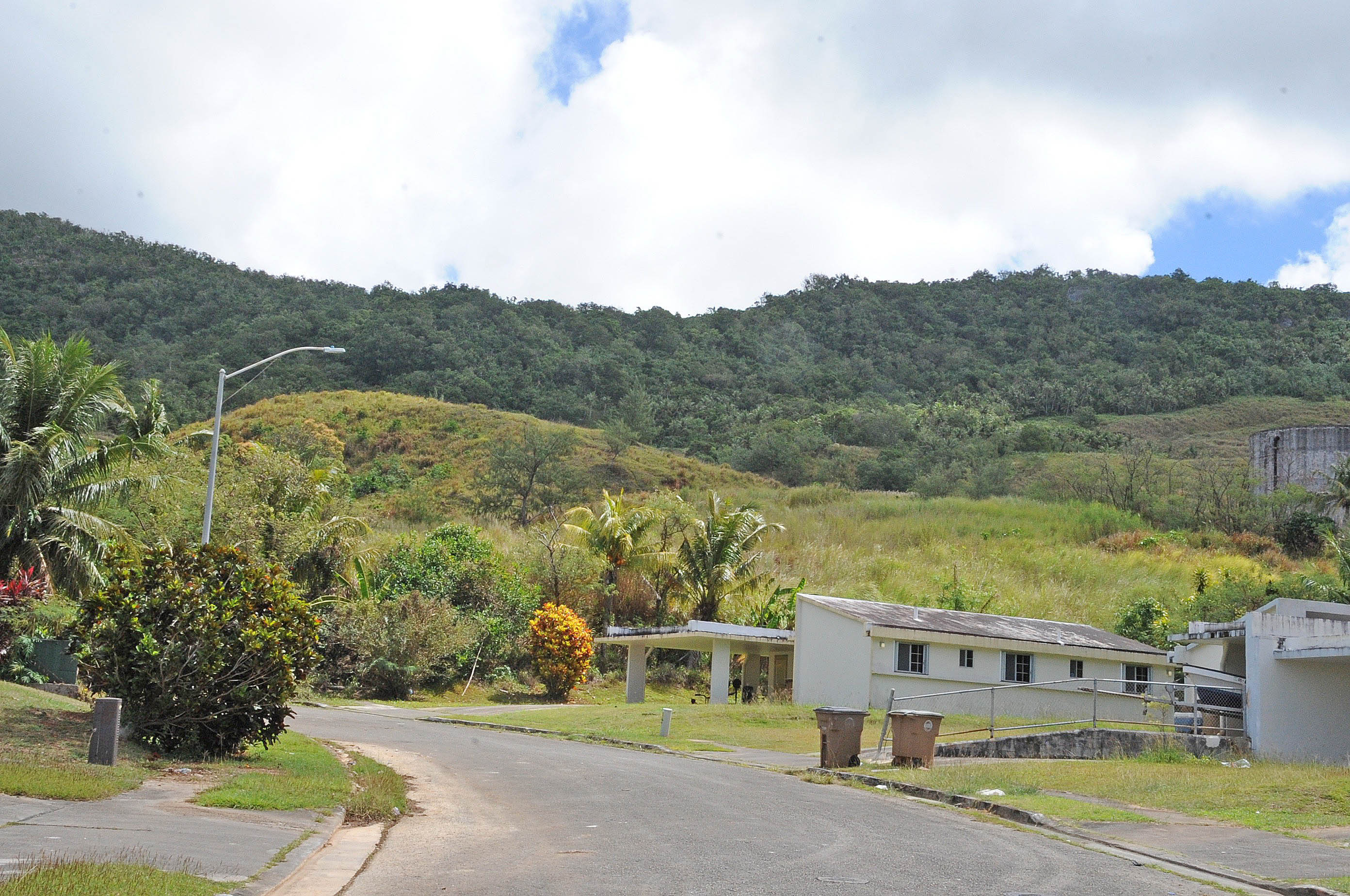
- Hill 40 in 2024

- Location within Guam
- Nearest city: Agat, Guam
- Coordinates: 13°22′30″N 144°39′7″E
- Area: 6 acres (2.4 ha)
- Built: 1944
- NRHP reference No.: 75001910
- Added to NRHP: March 4, 1975

Hill 40 is a militarily historic landform on the island of Guam. It is located about 325 metres (1,066 ft) east of Bangi Point, south of Agat on the island's west coast, rising to a height of 40 to 60 feet (12 to 18 m) above the coastal plain, with a strategically significant view of the Agat Invasion Beach. This hill was the scene of some of the most intense fighting during the landing phase of the 1944 Battle of Guam as Allied forces sought to establish their beachhead against the defending Japanese forces. The American 4th Marine Regiment of the 1st Provisional Marine Brigade captured Hill 40 on June 21, 1944, the day of the landing. That night the Japanese launched a counteroffensive that successfully retook the hill on three occasions. The Marines regrouped and regained the hill each time. The final push came in the early morning hours of July 22. The Japanese 38th Regiment was wiped out during this military action, with 345 killed on the Bangi Point plain, immediately west of Hill 40 near the beach.

Hill 40 was listed on the National Register of Historic Places in 1975.

== See also ==
- National Register of Historic Places listings in Guam
