= Pagat =

Pagat may refer to:

- Pagat.com, a website of card games rules
- A trump card in some tarot card gaes; see Trull (cards) § Tarock I: the Pagat or Spatz
- Pagat Site, an archaeological site in Guam, western Pacific
