= Mesa House =

Historic house in Hagåtña, Guam

- U.S. National Register of Historic Places
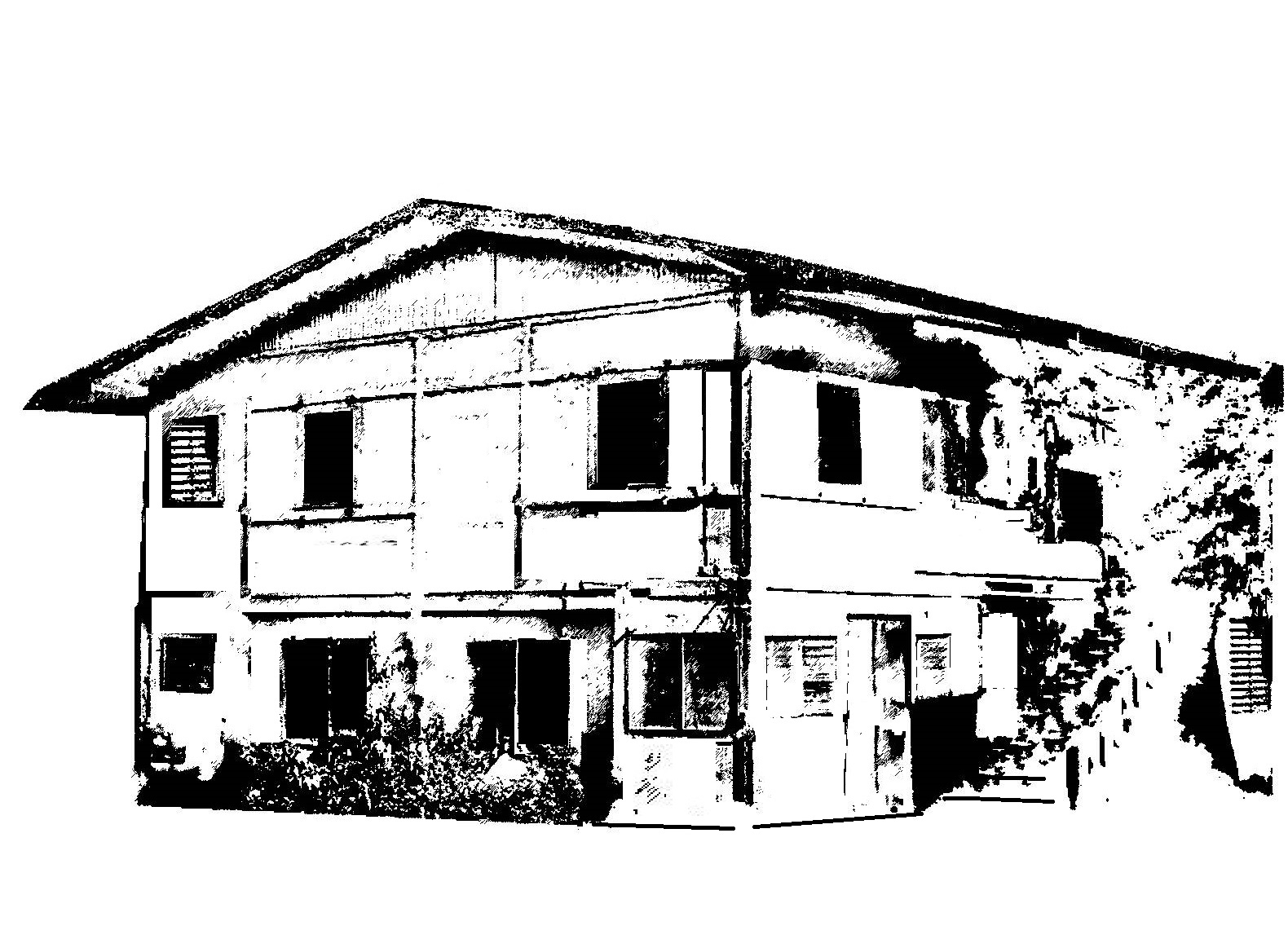

- Location within Guam
- Location: Maxwell St., Hagåtña, Guam
- Coordinates: 13°28′22″N 144°45′7″E
- Area: less than one acre
- Built: 1930
- Architectural style: Vern. Pacific Spanish Col.
- MPS: Agana Houses TR
- NRHP reference No.: 85000408
- Added to NRHP: February 8, 1985

The Mesa House, or Dr. Mesa House, is a historic house on Maxwell St. in Hagåtña, Guam.

Built in 1930, it is relatively rare as a pre-World War II house with ifil wood construction. The building is two stories on a 12.6 by 8.4 metres (41 ft × 28 ft) plan. The first floor is concrete, while the second floor is ifil wood in both framing and flooring. The roof is framed in non-ifil wood and covered in corrugated metal. Its colonial-era architecture is exemplified by exterior stairs and porch elements. The house is notable for surviving not just World War II, but also termite infestations and typhoons that have regularly devastated the island.

The house was listed on the National Register of Historic Places in 1985.

== See also ==
- National Register of Historic Places listings in Guam
