= Gongna Beach defenses =

- Gongna Beach Gun Emplacement
- U.S. National Register of Historic Places
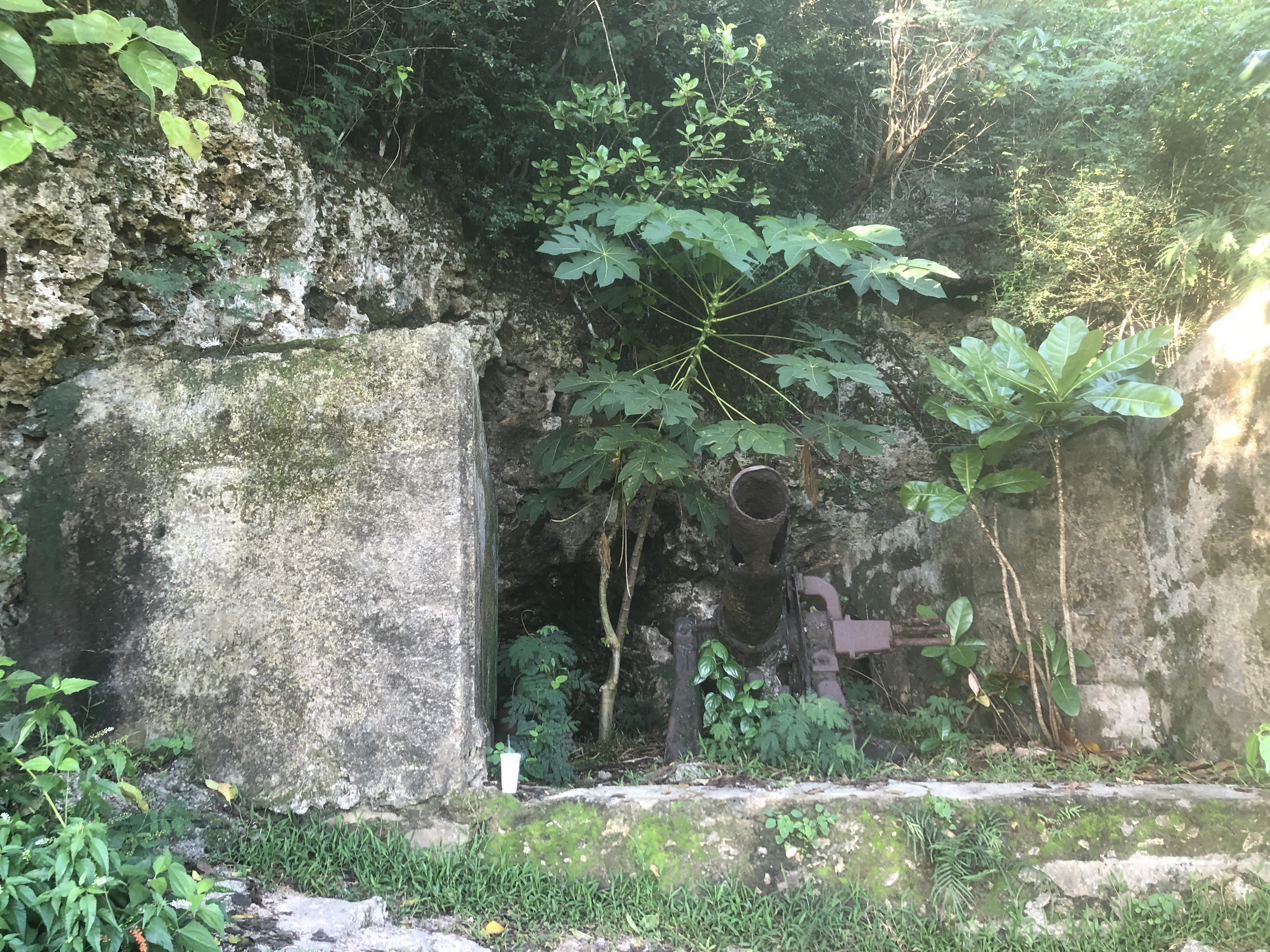
- Picture of the gun emplacement at Gongna Beach as it appeared on June 19, 2020. The partially collapsed attached pillbox is just off-camera to the right.

- Location within Guam
- Location: E. San Vitores Dr., Tamuning, Guam
- Coordinates: 13°31′28″N 144°48′5″E
- Area: less than one acre
- MPS: Japanese Coastal Defense Fortifications on Guam TR
- NRHP reference No.: 88001897
- Added to NRHP: March 4, 1991

The Gongna Beach defenses are a collection of World War II structures built on or near Gongna Beach (now also called Gun Beach) in Tamuning on the island of Guam, now a United States territory. These defenses were erected by the Imperial Japanese Army during its occupation of the island 1941–44. The three surviving elements were listed on the National Register of Historic Places in 1991. They are located well north of the main Allied landing areas of the 1944 Battle of Guam.

== Gun emplacement ==
At the north end of the beach, about 25 metres (82 ft) inland from the high tide line, stands a gun emplacement with an attached pillbox. The emplacement consists of two reinforced concrete walls flanking a Japanese 20 cm gun. From this position a covered way leads to a badly damaged pillbox structure, also made of reinforced concrete. At the time of its National Register listing, the pillbox was partially collapsed.

== Gun mount ==
Near the center of the beach, about 20 metres (66 ft) inland from the high tide line, is a circular concrete gun mount, which is about 2.4 metres (7.9 ft) in diameter. The exterior walls of the mount are 0.3 metres (0.98 ft) thick and rise about 0.5 metres (1.6 ft) above the ground; the central portion of the structure has been filled with coral rocks.

== Pillbox ==
A circular concrete pillbox stands atop the berm overlooking the beach. It is about 2.5 metres (8.2 ft) in diameter, and has a maximum height just over 1 metre (3.3 ft). It has a single opening, facing southwest, that is presumed to have acted as both access point and gun port.

== See also ==
- National Register of Historic Places listings in Guam
