= U.S. Naval Cemetery =

Historic site in Hagåtña, Guam

- Agana Cemetery
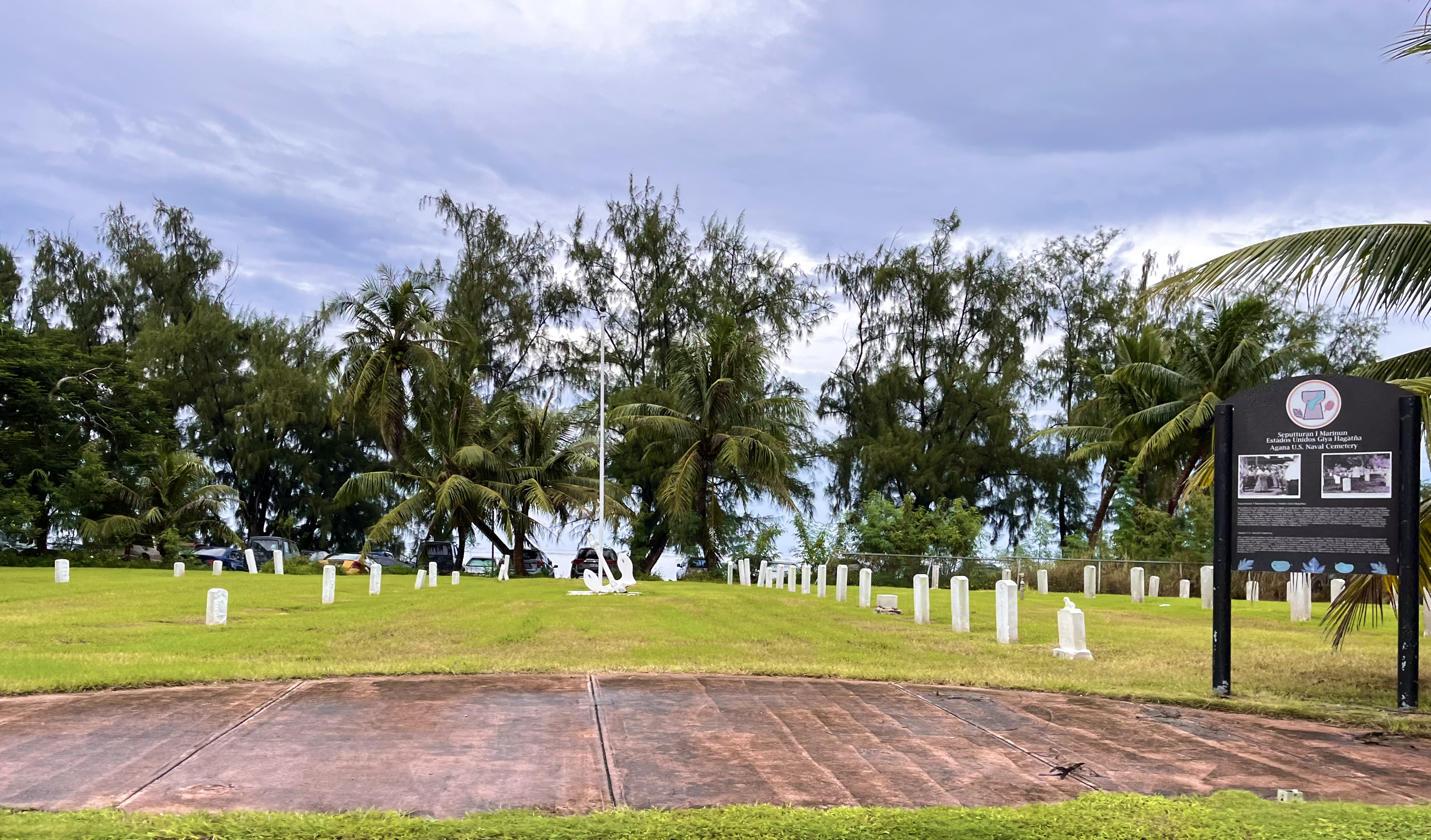
- Interactive map of U.S. Naval Cemetery

Details
- Established: 1902
- Location: Hagåtña
- Country: Guam
- Coordinates: 13.47744°N 144.75786°E
- Type: Military
- Find a Grave: U.S. Naval Cemetery
- Footnotes: NRHP 85000408 Guam
- U.S. Naval Cemetery
- U.S. National Register of Historic Places
- NRHP reference No.: 85000408
- Added to NRHP: November 30, 2015

The U.S. Naval Cemetery on Guam is located at Marine Corps Drive in East Hagåtña (also known as Agana). Following the June 1898 capture of Guam, Article II of the December 10, 1898 Treaty of Paris transferred Guam, Puerto Rico and the Philippines to the United States control on December 23.

The cemetery was first opened in 1902 and is the final resting place of US and foreign service members, family dependents, indigenous peoples of the Mariana Islands, and non-American civilians. It is currently a part of the Hagåtña Heritage Walking Trail. On November 30, 2015, the site was listed on the National Register of Historic Places listings in Guam.

During the 1941 Battle of Guam, American prisoners of war William Gautier Johnston, James Barbour, Hiram W. Elliott, and Euell Olive, as well as the fathers of Chester Butler and Arthur W. Jackson, were imprisoned at Japan's Hyogo Ken Internment Camp. All but Johnston survived and returned to Guam after the war, and are now buried at the U.S. Naval Cemetery.

Johnston died in the internment camp, but was not interred until after the war. His remains were returned to Guam and buried in the U.S. Naval Cemetery. In 1977, his remains were moved to an unspecified cemetery in the continental United States.
