= Nomna Bay Site =

- U.S. National Register of Historic Places
- Location: Address restricted
- Nearest city: Inarajan, Guam
- Area: 24.7 acres (10.0 ha)
- NRHP reference No.: 74002311
- Added to NRHP: December 27, 1974

The Nomna Bay Site is a prehistoric archaeological site on the east coast of the United States territory of Guam. Located on the southeast coast in the community of Inarajan, the site's primary features are fourteen latte stone house sites, located within 400 feet (120 m) of the waterline of Nomna Bay. One of these house sites has a T-shaped layout, which is extremely unusual for Micronesia latte sites. In the surrounding area are fire pits and stone mortar sites. Radiocarbon dating places use of the site to between about 1360 and 1675.

The site was listed on the National Register of Historic Places in 1974.

== See also ==
- National Register of Historic Places listings in Guam
