= Merlyn G. Cook School =

- U.S. National Register of Historic Places
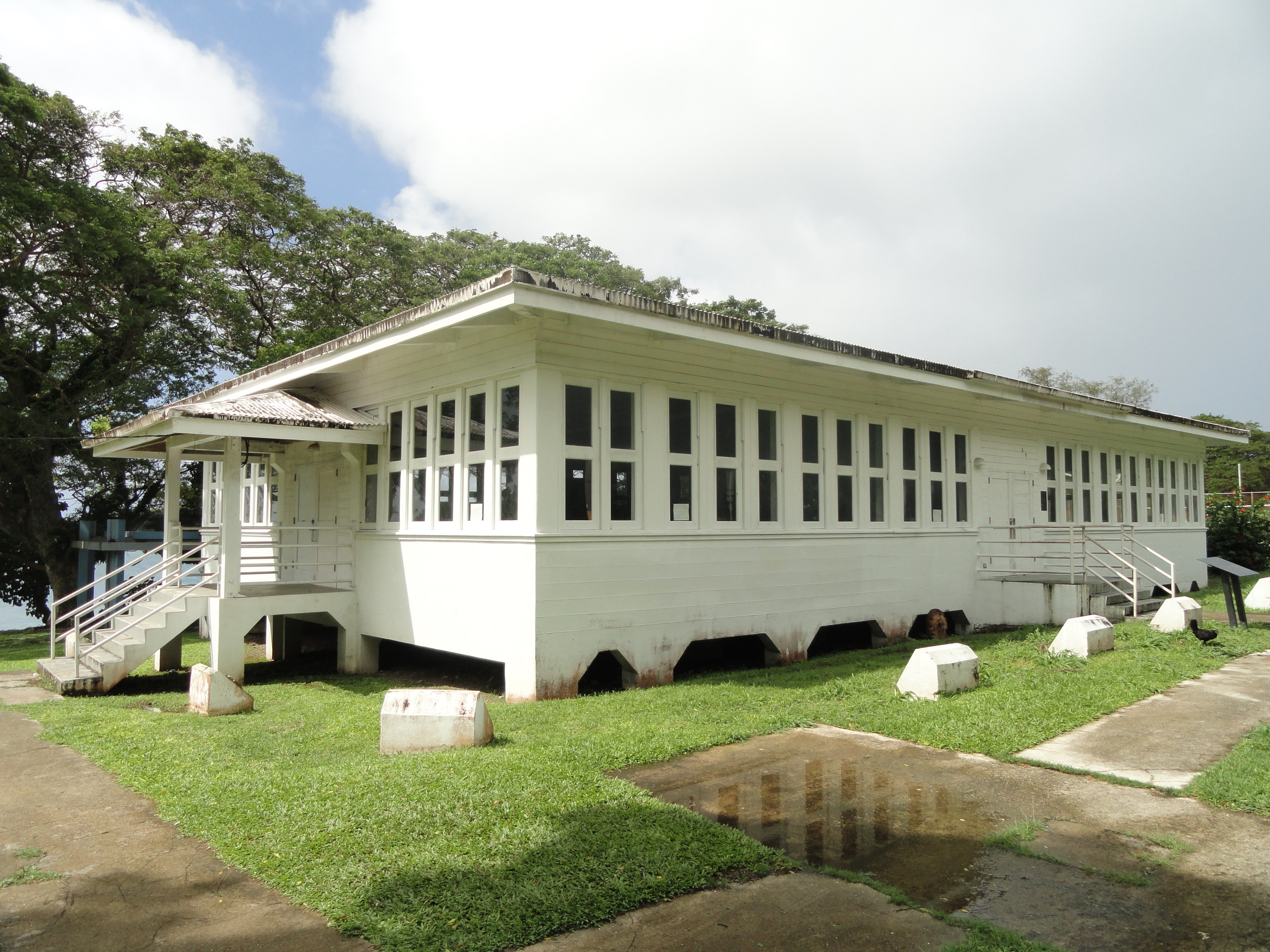

- Location within Guam
- Location: GU 4, Merizo, Guam
- Coordinates: 13°16′07″N 144°39′51″E
- Area: 0.5 acres (0.20 ha)
- Built: 1931
- Built by: U.S. Navy
- NRHP reference No.: 79003743
- Added to NRHP: November 29, 1979

The Merlyn G. Cook School, also known as the Merizo School, is a historic former school building on GU 4 in Merizo, Guam. Built sometime before 1931, it is one of the first schools built during the administration of the island by the United States Navy. Its construction methods are transitional, including both traditional Chamorro-Spanish methods and period American methods. A series of concrete pillars provide the main structure, with the flooring substructure and wall framing of insect-resistant ifil wood. The windows are covered with rare ifil-wood shutters that pivot horizontally. The building's interior is clad in wood planking typical of early 20th-century Chamorro construction. The school has long served as a community meeting point, and was used as a place of refuge during World War II.

The building was listed on the National Register of Historic Places in 1979.

== See also ==
- National Register of Historic Places listings in Guam
