= Torre Water Catchment =

- U.S. National Register of Historic Places
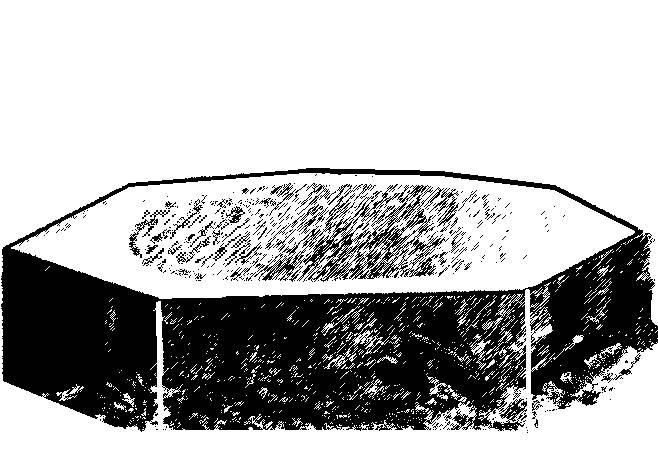

- Location within Guam
- Location: Hatsuho Golf Course, Yigo (Piga), Guam
- Coordinates: 13°34′55″N 144°51′57″E
- Area: less than one acre
- Built: 1916
- Built by: Torre, Juan dela
- MPS: Water Catchments MPS
- NRHP reference No.: 94001311
- Added to NRHP: November 14, 1994

The Torre Water Catchment, also known as the Hatsuho Water Catchment, is located on what is now Hatsuho Golf Course in Yigo (Piga), Guam. It is a historic site that was listed on the U.S. National Register of Historic Places in 1994. The catchment has an octagonal-shaped exterior made of concrete around limestone gravel and cobbles and has a plastered cylindrical interior. It is 5.19 metres (17.0 ft) in diameter and its walls vary from .27 to .46 meters thick. It was built in approximately 1916 by a farmer, Juan dela Torre, to provide water when needed, in a northern area of Guam that is far from regular water supplies.

== See also ==
- National Register of Historic Places listings in Guam
