= West Bona Site =

- U.S. National Register of Historic Places
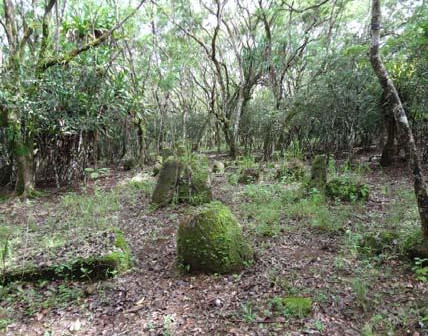
- Undated US Navy photo
- Location: Address restricted
- Nearest city: Santa Rita, Guam
- Area: 3 acres (1.2 ha)
- NRHP reference No.: 79003746
- Added to NRHP: March 26, 1979

The West Bona Site (also spelled "Bonya") is an archaeological site near Santa Rita on the island of Guam. It encompasses a prehistoric village site consisting of at least seven latte stone house sites. Most of them are not in good condition, although the largest, with twelve stones, is in good condition. Radiocarbon dating places early occupation of the site to between 1285 and 1435, reaching its height around 1500. The site is on the grounds of Naval Station Guam.

The site was listed on the National Register of Historic Places in 1979.

== See also ==
- National Register of Historic Places listings in Guam
