= Mount Tenjo Fortifications =

- U.S. National Register of Historic Places
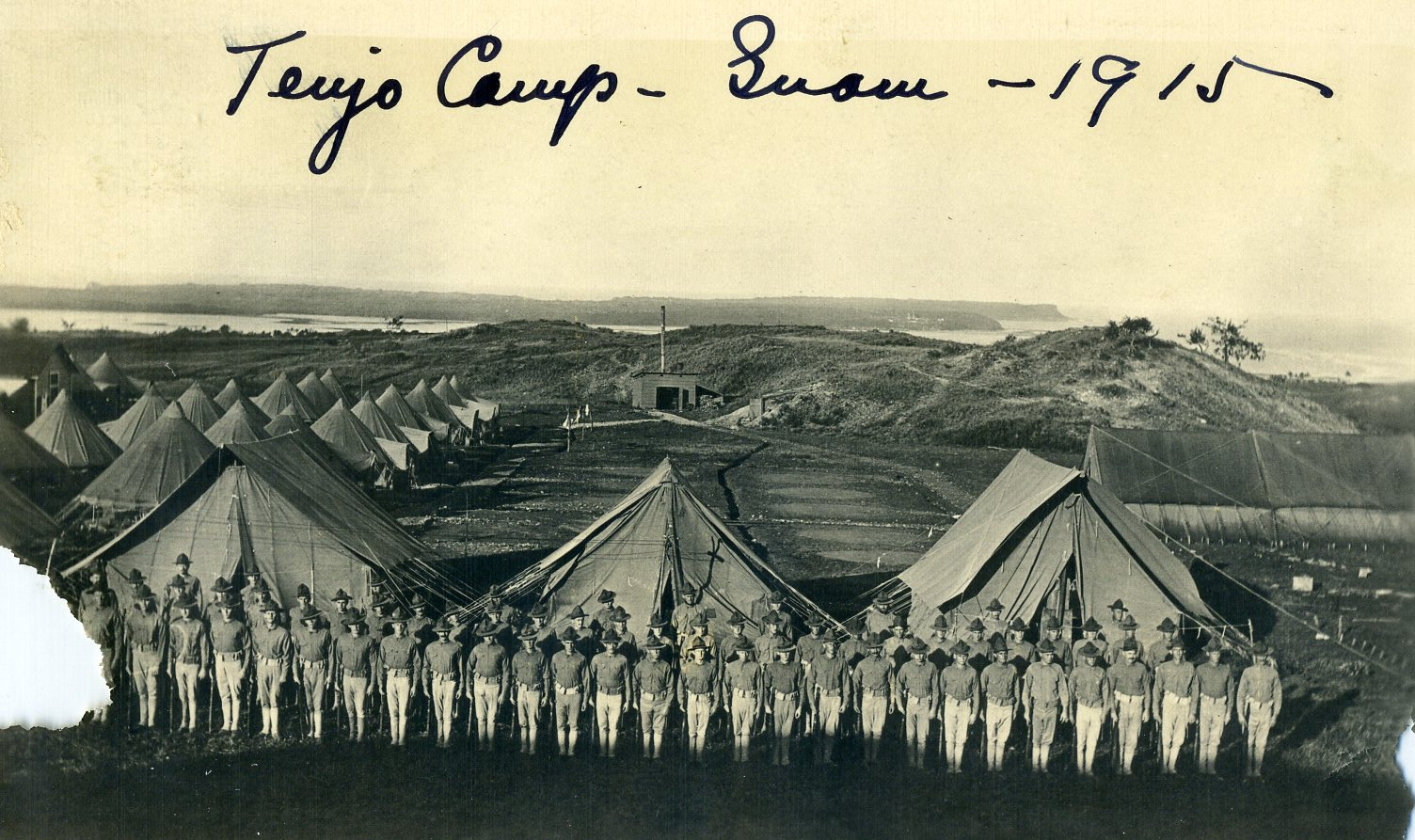
- U.S. Marines at Camp Barnett on Mount Tenjo, 1915

- Location within Guam
- Location: One mile west of Route One, northeast of Santa Rita, Guam
- Coordinates: 13°25′13″N 144°41′49″E
- Area: 2 acres (0.81 ha)
- Built: late 1910s
- NRHP reference No.: 79003745
- Added to NRHP: March 13, 1979

The Mount Tenjo Fortifications are a historic defensive gun battery site on Mount Tenjo, a hill overlooking Apra Harbor, the principal deep-water port on the island of Guam. The site includes concrete mounting pads for seven guns and the crumbling remains of a concrete command post structure. These facilities are located just below the crest of the hill on its west side. A defensive trench also extends along the top of the plateau-like hill. Unlike most early 20th-century fortifications on Guam, these facilities were built in the late 1910s by the United States Navy, and not by Japanese forces during the World War II occupation period. These are the only known surviving pre-World War II defensive fortification sites on the island. They were functionally abandoned as a result of the 1922 Washington Naval Conference. Mount Tenjo was the site of battle during the 1944 liberation of Guam.

The site was listed on the National Register of Historic Places in 1979.

== See also ==
- National Register of Historic Places listings in Guam
