= Spanish Dikes =

- U.S. National Register of Historic Places
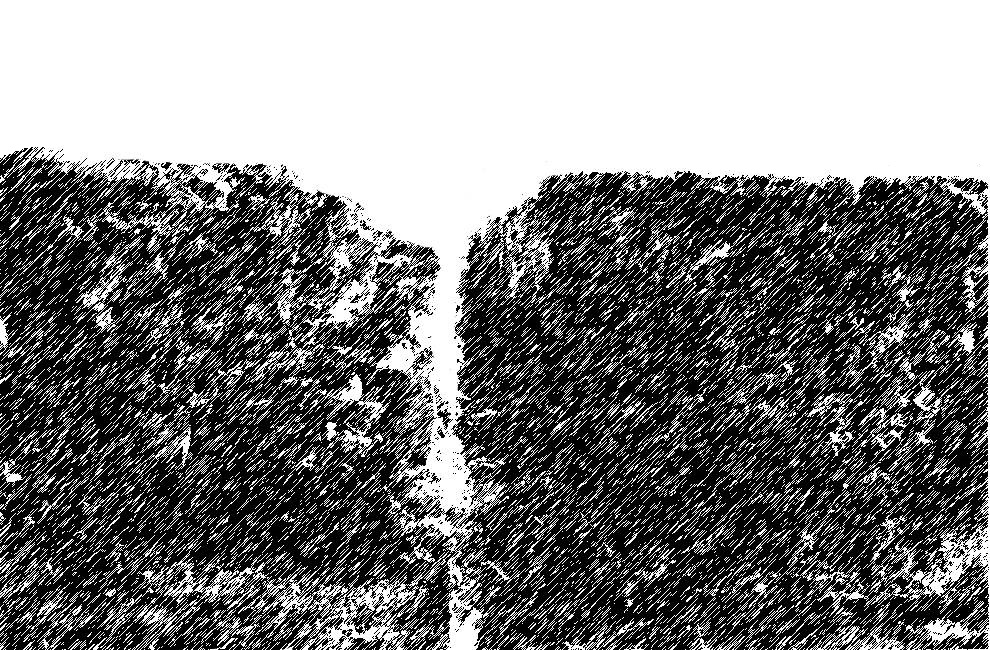

- Location within Guam
- Location: Northeast of Agana Springs, Hagåtña
- Nearest city: Agana, Guam
- Coordinates: 13°27′48″N 144°45′57″E
- Area: 3 acres (1.2 ha)
- NRHP reference No.: 74002303
- Added to NRHP: November 19, 1974

The Spanish Dikes, located northeast of Agana Springs, Hagåtña, Guam, are historic 19th-century water control structures that were listed on the National Register of Historic Places in 1974.

There are two sections of dikes in a swampy region outside Hagåtña. Both sections are constructed of mortared limestone, with buttresses for support, and openings at the top that act as sluiceways where water flow could be controlled. One section is about 70 metres (230 ft) long, varying in thickness from 0.3 to 1 metre (0.98 to 3.28 ft), while the other is 22.5 metres (74 ft) long. The construction dates of these dikes is unknown, but similar structures were likely to exist in the area in the 1830s, and in the 1870s the area was being used for cultivation of rice by Filipino penal labor in an effort to solve the island's long-standing issues with insufficient food production.

== See also ==
- National Register of Historic Places listings in Guam
