= Talagi Pictograph Cave =

Archaeological site in Guam

- U.S. National Register of Historic Places
- Location: Address restricted
- Nearest city: Andersen Air Force Base, Guam
- Area: less than one acre
- NRHP reference No.: 04001240
- Added to NRHP: March 24, 2004

The Talagi Pictograph Cave is a rock art site on the island of Guam. It is located on property owned by the government of Guam within the bounds of Andersen Air Force Base on the northern part of the island near Tarague Beach. The cave contains thirteen pictographs representing human figures, and a place where limestone mortar was used that is of prehistoric origin. Based on the characteristics of the figures, it is believed that they were probably the work of a single individual. It is one of fewer than ten known rock art sites on the island.

The cave was listed on the National Register of Historic Places in 2004.

== See also ==
- National Register of Historic Places listings in Guam
