= Cruz Water Catchment =

Private water supply structure in Guam

- U.S. National Register of Historic Places
- Location within Guam
- Location: .01 mi. S of Guam 9, SE of Pott's Junction, Yigo, Guam
- Coordinates: 13°35′9″N 144°51′58″E
- Area: less than one acre
- Built: 1920
- Built by: Jose Pachaco Finona
- MPS: Water Catchments MPS
- NRHP reference No.: 94001310
- Added to NRHP: November 14, 1994

The Cruz Water Catchment, also known historically as Finona's Water Catchment, is a historic private water supply structure in the United States territory of Guam. It is located south of Guam Highway 9 in the village of Potts Junction in the central northern part of the island. It is a circular concrete structure 3.74 metres (12.3 ft) in diameter, and is 2.55 metres (8.4 ft) in height, of which 0.87 metres (2.9 ft) is exposed above ground level. Its estimated capacity is just over 17,000 litres (4,500 US gal). It was built, according to local oral history, about 1920, and was used to capture rainfall from a nearby house that was destroyed by Typhoon Karen in 1962. The catchment was used to provide water to as many as seven local households, making possible year-round living in an area otherwise lacking fresh water.

The structure was listed on the National Register of Historic Places in 1994.

== See also ==
- National Register of Historic Places listings in Guam
