= As Sombreru Pillboxes =

- As Sombreru Pillbox I
- U.S. National Register of Historic Places
- Location within Guam
- Location: Address restricted
- Nearest city: Tumon, Guam
- Area: less than one acre
- Built by: 48th Independent Mixed Brigade; 29th Division
- MPS: Japanese Coastal Defense Fortifications on Guam TR
- NRHP reference No.: 88001883
- Added to NRHP: March 4, 1991

- As Sombreru Pillbox II
- U.S. National Register of Historic Places
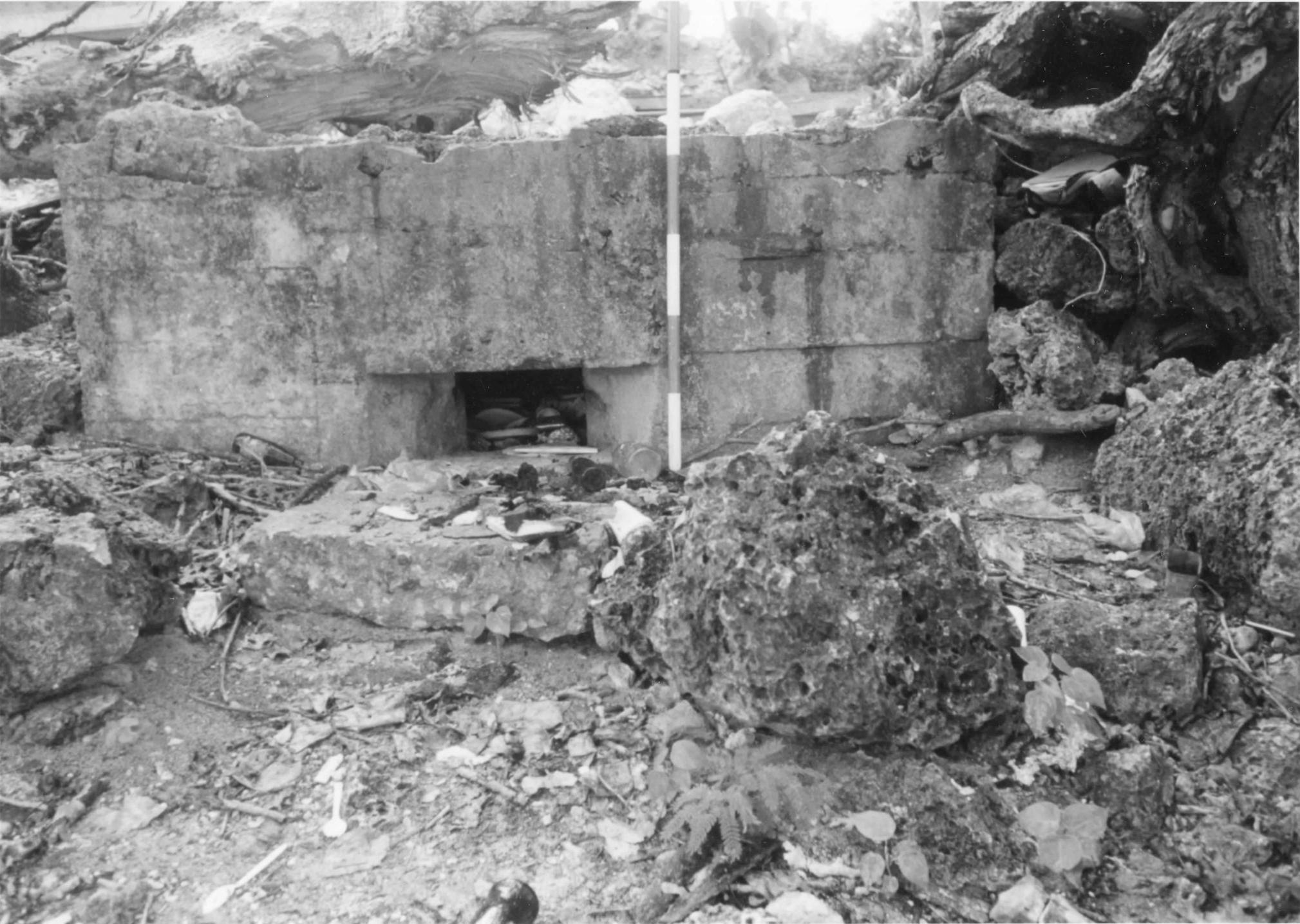
- As Sombreru Pillbox II in 1991

- Location within Guam
- Location: S shore of Tumon Beach in Tumon Bay, Tumon, Guam
- Coordinates: 13°30′22″N 144°47′48″E
- Area: less than one acre
- MPS: Japanese Coastal Defense Fortifications on Guam TR
- NRHP reference No.: 88001864
- Added to NRHP: March 4, 1991

- As Sombreru Pillbox III
- U.S. National Register of Historic Places
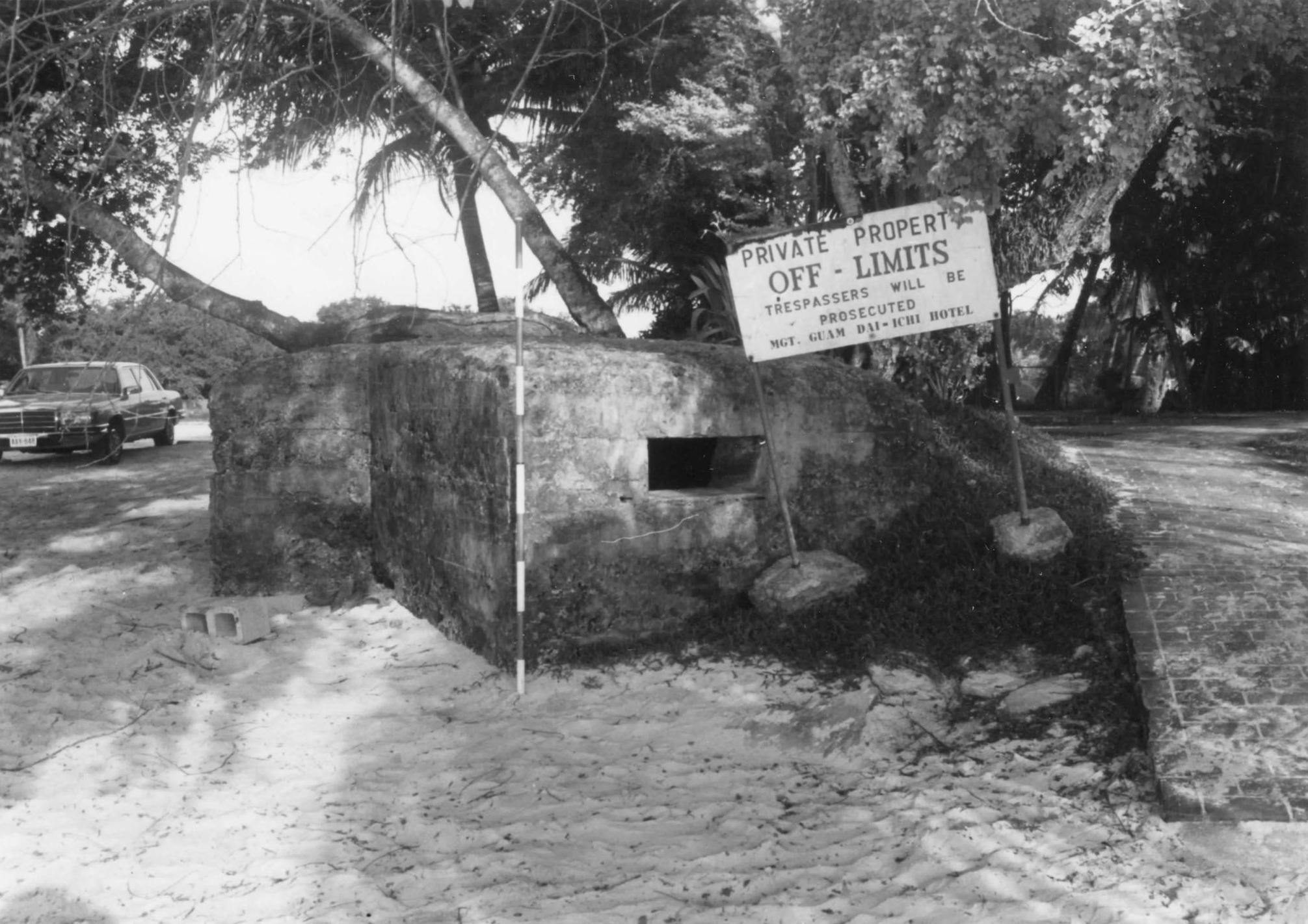
- As Sombreru Pillbox III in 1991

- Location within Guam
- Location: W of Matapang Park, Tumon, Guam
- Coordinates: 13°30′20″N 144°47′49″E
- Area: less than one acre
- MPS: Japanese Coastal Defense Fortifications on Guam TR
- NRHP reference No.: 88001887
- Added to NRHP: March 4, 1991

The As Sombreru Pillbox I, As Sombreru Pillbox II, and As Sombreru Pillbox III are three historic defensive fortifications on Guam, near Tumon, that were listed on the U.S. National Register of Historic Places in 1991. They are pillboxes, a type of defensive fortification, built by the 48th Independent Mixed Brigade; 29th Division of the Imperial Japanese Army during 1941-1944, between Japan capturing Guam on December 8, 1941 from the United States and the U.S. recapturing Guam in 1944.

"As Sombreru Pillbox I" has also known been known as As Sombreru Point Japanese Fortification. Its precise location is not disclosed by the National Register; it is listed as "Address Restricted".

"As Sombrero Pillbox II" is a 2.40-by-2.70-metre (7.9 ft × 8.9 ft) pillbox located 7 metres (23 ft) in from the high tide line on the south shore of Tumon Beach in Tumon Bay. Its roof slab is about .45-metre (1.5 ft) thick.

"As Sombrero Pillbox III" is located on Matapang Beach west of Matapang Park, about 9 metres (30 ft) in from the high tide line. It is a 4.0-by-2.70-metre (13.1 ft × 8.9 ft) two-room pillbox with a "complex configuration" of six walls; its west-facing wall is .45-metre (1.5 ft) thick and has a gun port commanding the center of Tumon Bay. Entrance and an air vent come through the east wall. It was built of steel-reinforced concrete including beach rubble, and, as of the NRHP listing date, was in "excellent" condition. There are "impressions of tabi prints and a possible Japanese character" in the cement roof, which is about .25-metre (0.82 ft) thick.

It is not clear whether any of these pillboxes engaged directly in the 1944 battle for Guam. These pillboxes were clearly designed to repel invaders coming from the sea. The U.S. invasion beginning on July 21, 1944, however, was further to the south and west; the area of these pillboxes was over-run by U.S. forces coming from the south, on about August 2, 1944.

== See also ==
- National Register of Historic Places listings in Guam
