= Fafai Beach Site =

Archaeological site in Guam

- U.S. National Register of Historic Places
- Location: Address restricted
- Nearest city: Tamuning, Guam
- Area: 12.4 acres (5.0 ha)
- NRHP reference No.: 74002316
- Added to NRHP: November 19, 1974

The Fafai Beach Site is a prehistoric archaeological site near the village of Tamuning on the island of Guam. The site is stratified, containing layers representative of both the Latte and Pre-Latte periods of prehistory. The site includes several latte stone house sites, stone mortar sites, and rock overhang areas with cultural deposits. Stone, shell, and charcoal artifacts have been found here, as have several human burials.

The site was listed on the National Register of Historic Places in 1974.

== See also ==
- National Register of Historic Places listings in Guam
