= Talofofo River Valley Site =

- U.S. National Register of Historic Places
- Location: Address restricted
- Nearest city: Inarajan, Guam
- Area: 3.1 acres (1.3 ha)
- NRHP reference No.: 74002312
- Added to NRHP: December 27, 1974

The Talofofo River Valley Site is an archaeological site near Inarajan on the island of Guam. The site's major features include latte stone sets and rockshelters, with radiocarbon dating placing human occupation of the area as early as the first century CE. The site is located in the alluvial plain of the Talofofo River, and was excavated by archaeologist Fred Reinman in 1977.

The site was listed on the National Register of Historic Places in 1974.

== See also ==
- National Register of Historic Places listings in Guam
