= Tumon Bay Japanese fortifications =

- Tomhum Cliffline Fortification I
- U.S. National Register of Historic Places
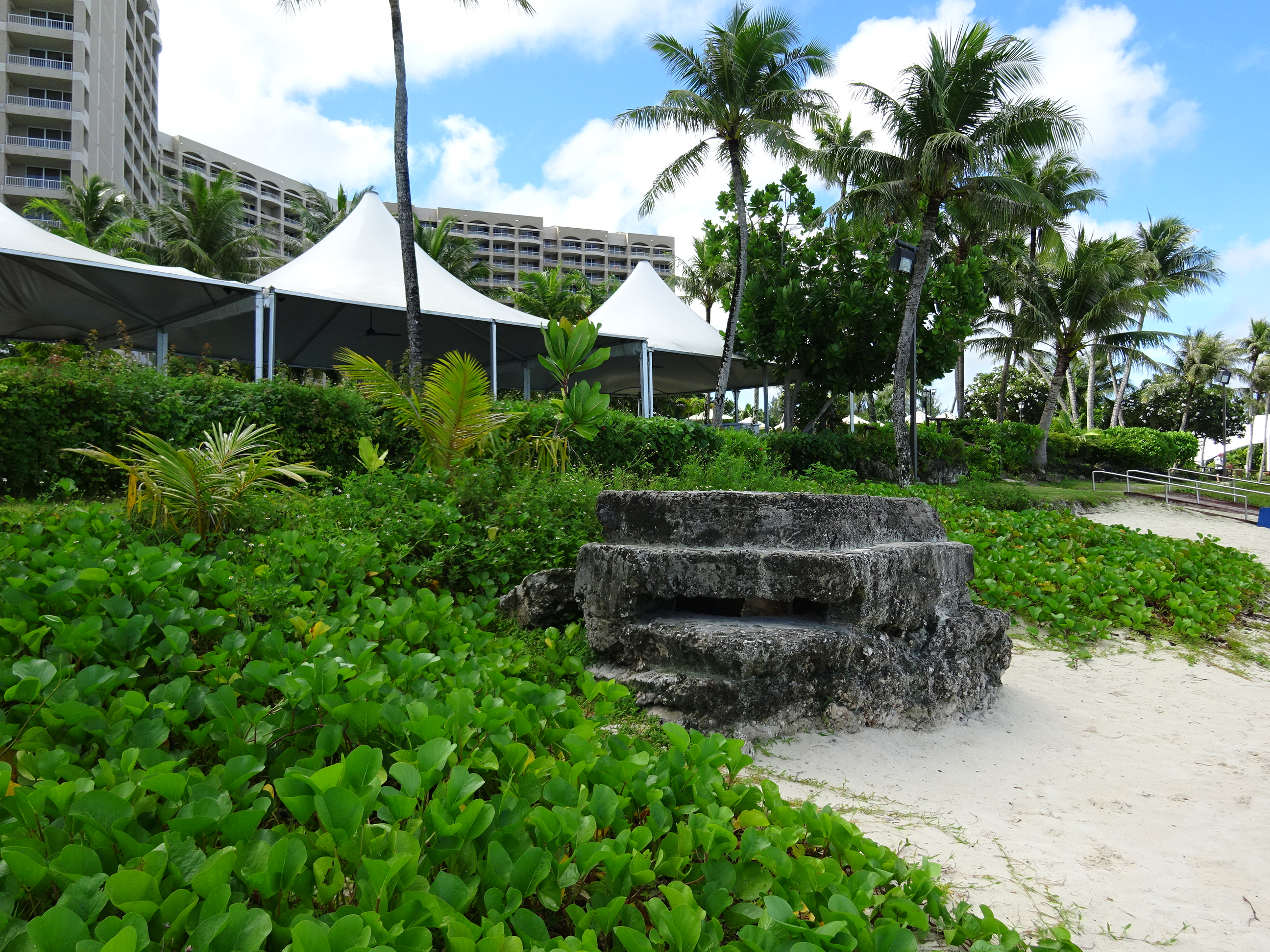
- Japanese pillbox in front of Hyatt Regency Guam, 2017

- Location within Guam
- Nearest city: Tumon, Guam
- Coordinates: 13°30′26″N 144°48′20″E
- Area: less than one acre
- MPS: Japanese Coastal Defense Fortifications on Guam TR
- NRHP reference No.: 88001895
- Added to NRHP: March 4, 1991

The Tumon Bay Japanese fortifications are a collection of World War II-era military structures along the coast of Guam in and near the village of Tumon. Many of these structures were listed on the National Register of Historic Places in 1991, using the alternate spelling "Tomhum". They include pillboxes on or close to the beach, and concrete structures and caves located a short way inland on the limestone cliffs that overlook the beach.

== Beach defenses ==
There are three pillboxes on or near the beach of Tumon Bay, all made from concrete mixed with coral limestone. The first is a partially-collapsed concrete structure between the Hyatt Regency Guam and the beach; it has two embrasures providing gun placements facing north and west. The second is located south of the first, north of the Holiday Resort and Spa; it has an entrance (damaged) to the south, with wall extensions, and a gun opening facing roughly east, with a view over much of the bay and coastline. The third is located further west, near the Fiesta Resort Guam, and is further inland (about 50 metres (160 ft) instead of the 6–7 metres (20–23 ft)) than the first two, having been relocated from its original position closer to the beach. It is six-sided, a roughly rectangular shape with two corners clipped, with gun openings on the short side and angled sides.

== Cliff defenses ==
There are at least three defensive structures documented in the cliffs above Tumon Beach. Cliffline Fortification One, about 8 miles (13 km) south of St. John's School, is a concrete structure 1.75 by 2.0 metres (5 ft 9 in × 6 ft 7 in), with a west-facing embrasure overlooking Tumon Bay. Only its entrance is visible. Cliffline Fortification Two is a series of hand-dug caves excavated out of the limestone cliffs. The largest of these is 17.5 metres (57 ft) in length, with limestone pills for support, and is the only one showing evidence of use by the Japanese. The others are typically much shallower, with depths of under 7 metres (23 ft).

== See also ==
- National Register of Historic Places listings in Guam
