= Ilik River Fortification I =

- U.S. National Register of Historic Places
- Location: Address restricted
- Nearest city: Yona, Guam
- Area: less than one acre
- MPS: Japanese Coastal Defense Fortifications on Guam TR
- NRHP reference No.: 88001869
- Added to NRHP: March 4, 1991

The Ilik River Fortification I near Yona, Guam was built by Japanese forces during World War II. It was listed on the U.S. National Register of Historic Places in 1991.

The National Park Service's website reports that the PDF document which would describe the site is not available online, but it provides a photo from 1986 with location identified as "Ylig River Caves" and showing "floor of trench and cave".

== See also ==
- National Register of Historic Places listings in Guam
