= Agana-Hagatna Pillbox =

- U.S. National Register of Historic Places
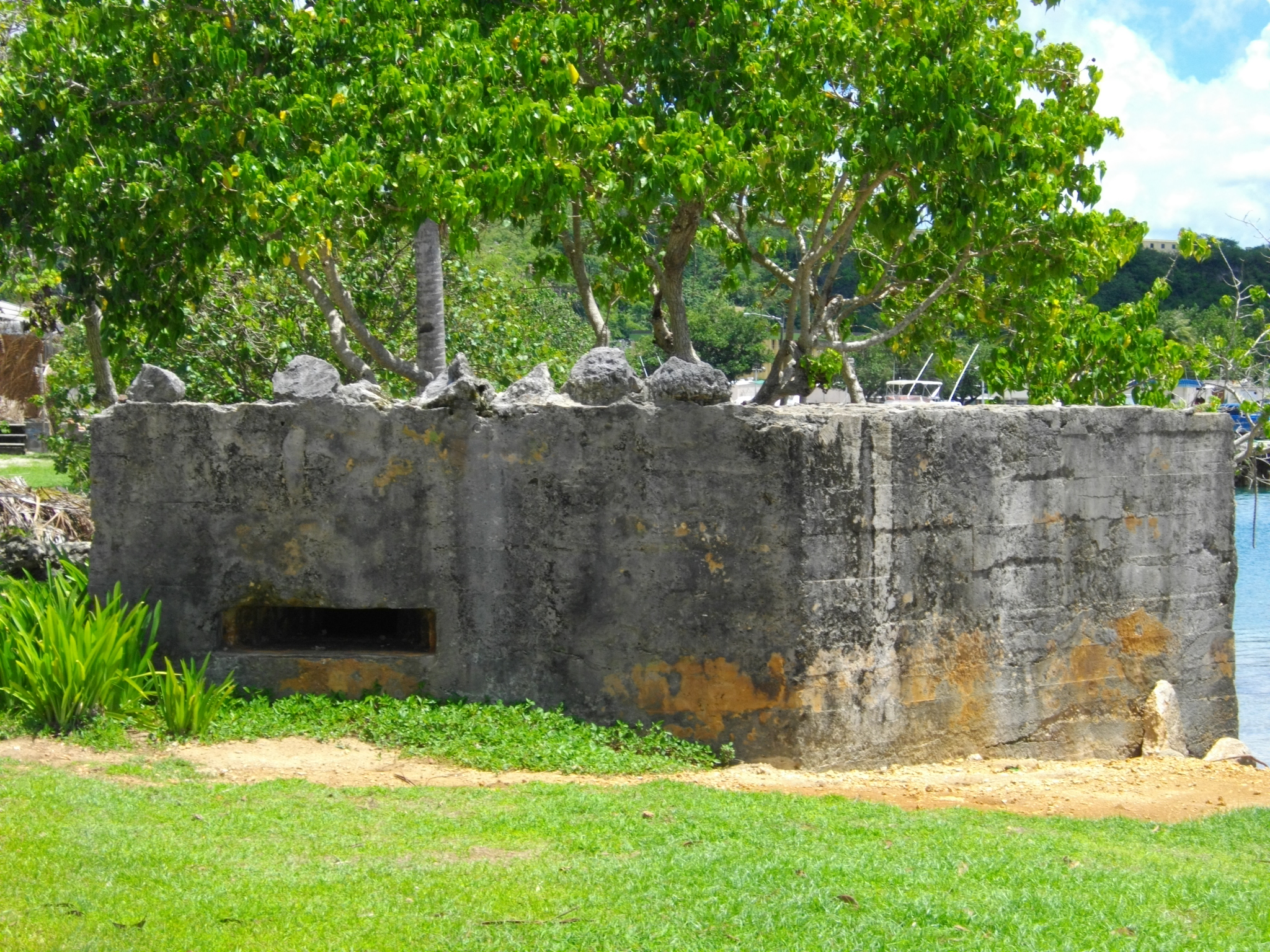

- Location within Guam
- Location: W shore of Paseo de Susana, Hagåtña, Guam
- Coordinates: 13°28′44″N 144°44′58″E
- Area: less than one acre
- MPS: Japanese Coastal Defense Fortifications on Guam TR
- NRHP reference No.: 88001880
- Added to NRHP: March 4, 1991

The Agana-Hagåtña Pillbox is a former Japanese defensive fortification in Hagåtña, Guam. It is a six-sided reinforced concrete structure, located a short way above the high-tide line on the west side of the Paseo de Susana, a small peninsula jutting north from the village center. There is another wall providing cover for the entrance on the land side. The interior is divided into two chambers, each of which has a gun port. The structure was built by Guam's Japanese defenders during their occupation of the island (1941–44) in World War II.

The structure was listed on the National Register of Historic Places in 1991. It may be seen as part of a walking tour of Hagåtña.

== See also ==
- National Register of Historic Places listings in Guam
