= Malesso Japanese Rice Mill =

- U.S. National Register of Historic Places
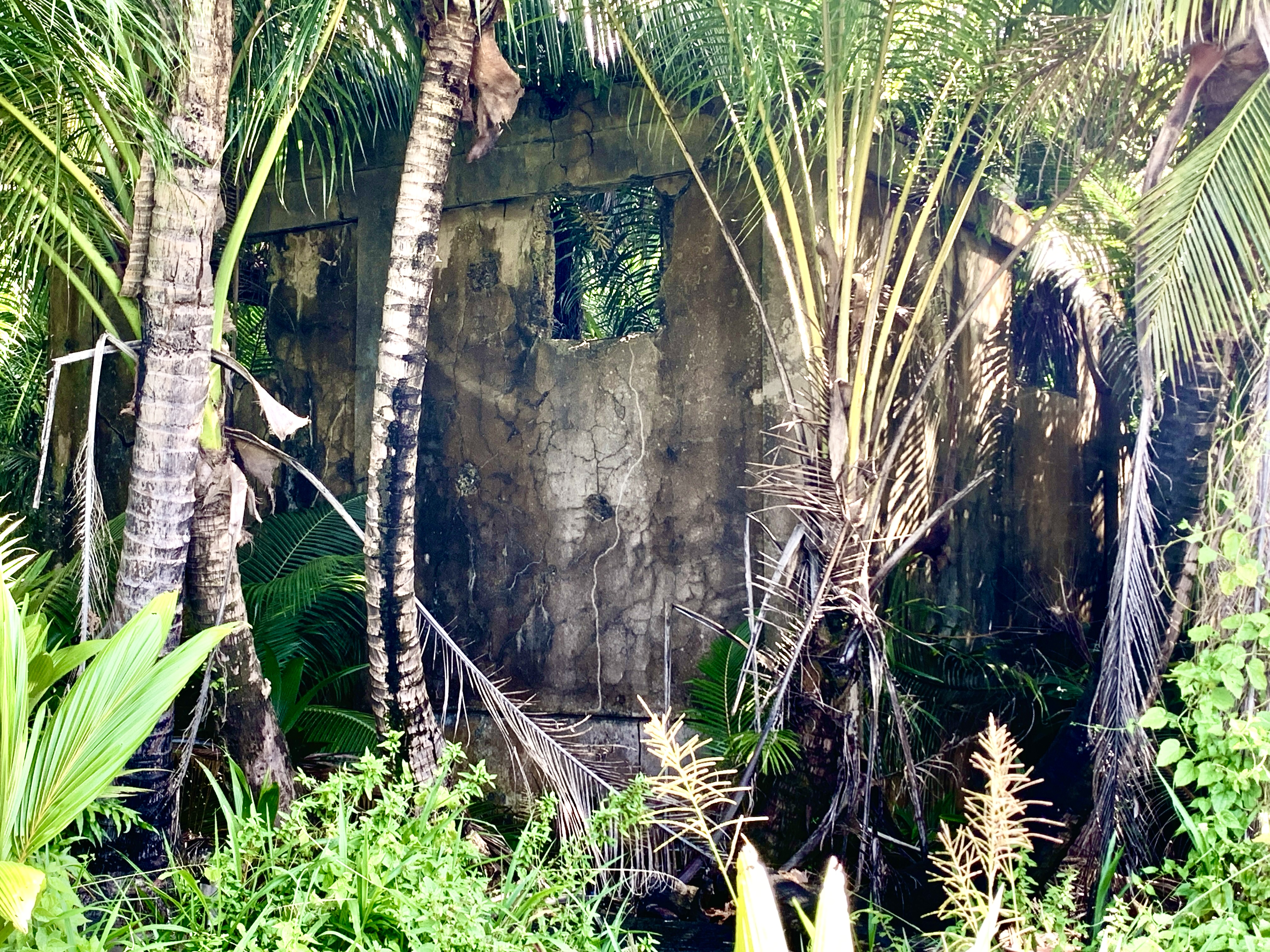

- Location within Guam
- Location: Jesus Barcinas Road, Merizo, Guam
- Coordinates: 13°15′50″N 144°40′16.5″E
- Area: Less than one acre
- Built: 1943
- NRHP reference No.: 12000973
- Added to NRHP: November 28, 2012

The Malesso Japanese Rice Mill is (despite its name) a historic World War II-era storage building in Merizo, Guam. It is a single-story concrete structure with two rooms, located on a small parcel in a residential area south of Guam Highway 4 off Barcinas Road. The concrete was made of locally sourced aggregate and lime. It was completed (according to an inscription on its south wall) on December 24, 1943, by conscripted Chamorro labor working for the occupying Japanese authorities. It was built as part of a project by the Japanese to improve rice production in the area during the later period of the occupation. There is no evidence that the building was intended to house facilities for milling rice, although it has always been referred to locally as a rice mill. It is the only known non-military structure to survive on the island from the Japanese occupation period.

The building was listed on the National Register of Historic Places in 2012.

== See also ==
- National Register of Historic Places listings in Guam
