= National Register of Historic Places listings in Guam =

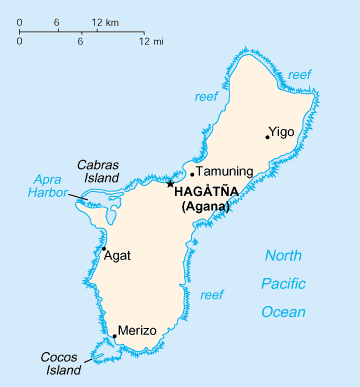
Map of Guam

This is a list of the buildings, sites, districts, and objects listed on the National Register of Historic Places in Guam. There are currently 134 listed sites spread across 17 of the 19 villages of Guam. The villages of Agana Heights and Mongmong-Toto-Maite do not have any listings.

Listed historic sites include Spanish colonial ruins, a few surviving pre-World War II ifil houses, Japanese fortifications, two massacre sites, and a historic district. Two other locations that were previously listed have been removed from the Register.

This National Park Service list is complete through NPS recent listings posted April 24, 2026.

== Numbers of listings ==
	District	# of Sites
1	Agana Heights	0
2	Asan-Maina	5
3	Barrigada	2
4	Chalan Pago-Ordot	2
5	Dededo	6
6	Hågat	7
7	Hagåtña	14
8	Humåtak	14
9	Inalåhan	11
10	Malesso	8
11	Mangilao	2
12	Mongmong-Toto-Maite	0
13	Piti	5
14	Sånta Rita-Sumai	9
15	Sinajana	1
16	Talo'fo'fo	10
17	Tamuning	25
18	Yigo	8
19	Yona	6
(duplicates)		(1)
Total:		134

== Agana Heights ==
There are no properties listed on the National Register of Historic Places in Agana Heights.

== Asan-Maina ==
	Name on the Register	Image	Date listed	Location	Village	Description
1	Asan Invasion Beach	Asan Invasion Beach	February 14, 1979 (#79002617)	North edge of Asan; 13°28′22″N 144°42′46″E	Asan-Maina	
2	Asan Ridge Battle Area	Asan Ridge Battle Area	July 18, 1975 (#75001916)	Between Asan and Nimitz Hill; 13°28′06″N 144°42′55″E	Asan-Maina	
3	Fonte River Dam	Fonte River Dam	February 25, 2014 (#14000035)	Fonte River, immediately southwest of Nimitz Hill Overlook Park; 13°27′31″N 144°43′43″E	Asan-Maina	
4	Matgue River Valley Battle Area	Matgue River Valley Battle Area	April 3, 1975 (#75001917)	0.6 miles (0.97 km) southwest of Asan of Marine Drive; 13°27′54″N 144°42′17″E	Asan-Maina	
5	Memorial Beach Park	Memorial Beach Park	August 7, 1974 (#74002039)	Guam Highway 1; 13°28′24″N 144°42′52″E	Asan-Maina	

== Barrigada ==
	Name on the Register	Image	Date listed	Location	Village	Description
1	Canada Water Wells	Canada Water Wells	September 26, 2008 (#08000165)	Near junction of Canada-Toto Road and Canada-Toto Loop Road; 13°27′42″N 144°47′04″E	Barrigada	
2	Guzman Water Catchment	Guzman Water Catchment	November 14, 1994 (#94001312)	0.25 miles (0.40 km) south of Guam Highway 8 and 0.25 miles (0.40 km) east of Guam Highway 10; 13°28′02″N 144°48′22″E	Barrigada	

== Chalan Pago-Ordot ==
	Name on the Register	Image	Date listed	Location	Village	Description
1	Pagu' Pillbox I	Pagu' Pillbox I	March 4, 1991 (#88001878)	Shore of Pago Bay; 13°25′18″N 144°46′55″E	Chalan Pago-Ordot	
2	Pagu' Pillbox II	Pagu' Pillbox II	March 4, 1991 (#88001879)	Shore of Pago Bay; 13°24′59″N 144°46′56″E	Chalan Pago-Ordot	

== Dededo ==
	Name on the Register	Image	Date listed	Location	Village	Description
1	Haputo Beach Site	Haputo Beach Site	November 20, 1974 (#74002308)	Address restricted	Dededo	
2	South Finegayan Latte Stone Park	South Finegayan Latte Stone Park	September 5, 1975 (#75002150)	74 Golden Shower Lane; 13°33′08″N 144°49′34″E	Dededo	
3	Talagi Pictograph Cave	Talagi Pictograph Cave	March 24, 2004 (#04001240)	Andersen Air Force Base; Address Restricted	Dededo and Yigo	
4	Tumon-Maui Well	Tumon-Maui Well	March 4, 2016 (#14000893)	Junction of Marine Corps Drive and Tumon Lane; 13°30′35″N 144°48′34″E	Dededo	
5	Uruno Beach Site		December 27, 1974 (#74002306)	Address restricted	Dededo	
6	Uruno Site		December 27, 1974 (#74002307)	Address restricted	Dededo	

== Hågat ==
	Name on the Register	Image	Date listed	Location	Village	Description
1	Agat Invasion Beach	Agat Invasion Beach	March 4, 1975 (#75001913)	Coastline northwest of Agat from Toocha Beach south to Bangi; 13°23′07″N 144°39′18″E	Hågat	
2	Agat World War II Amtrac	Agat World War II Amtrac	December 13, 2011 (#11000880)	Address restricted	Hågat	Sunken landing vehicle off Agat Beach.
3	Cable Station Ruins	Cable Station Ruins	September 6, 1979 (#79003742)	6 miles (9.7 km) north of Agat; 13°26′17″N 144°38′57″E	Hågat	
4	Hill 40	Hill 40	March 4, 1975 (#75001910)	0.2 miles (0.32 km) southwest of Hågat off Guam Highway 2; 13°22′37″N 144°39′16″E	Hågat	
5	Taelayag Spanish Bridge		October 10, 1974 (#74002304)	West of Guam Highway 2; 13°21′16″N 144°38′45″E	Hågat	
6	Taleyfac Spanish Bridge	Taleyfac Spanish Bridge	September 10, 1974 (#74002305)	Off Guam Highway 2; 13°21′48″N 144°38′58″E	Hågat	
7	Umang Dam		February 6, 2009 (#08001408)	South side of Finile Road; 13°22′38″N 144°39′27″E	Hågat	

== Hagåtña ==
	Name on the Register	Image	Date listed	Location	Village	Description
1	Agana Historic District	Agana Historic District	February 8, 1985 (#85000495)	Roughly bounded by South 2nd, South 3rd, and West 9th, Santa Cruz and Legaspi Streets; 13°28′27″N 144°45′52″E	Hagåtña	
2	Agana Spanish Bridge	Agana Spanish Bridge	September 6, 1974 (#74002300)	Aspenall Street and Guam Highway 1; 13°28′36″N 144°45′01″E	Hagåtña	Historic Spanish colonial bridge
3	Agana-Hagatna Pillbox	Agana-Hagatna Pillbox	March 4, 1991 (#88001880)	West shore of Paseo de Susana; 13°28′41″N 144°45′58″E	Hagåtña	
4	Agana/Hagatna Cliffline Fortifications	Agana/Hagatna Cliffline Fortifications	March 4, 1991 (#88001877)	Address restricted	Hagåtña	
5	Ayulang Pillbox		March 4, 1991 (#88001889)	Address restricted	Hagåtña	
6	Fort Santa Agueda	Fort Santa Agueda	August 30, 1974 (#74002301)	Guam Highway 7; 13°28′25″N 144°44′52″E	Hagåtña	
7	Guam Congress Building	Guam Congress Building	February 1, 2007 (#06001320)	Chalan Santo Papa; 13°28′30″N 144°45′08″E	Hagåtña	
8	Guam Institute	Guam Institute	October 6, 1977 (#77001568)	Off Guam Highway 1; 13°28′26″N 144°44′44″E	Hagåtña	
9	Mesa House		February 8, 1985 (#85000408)	Maxwell Street; 13°28′09″N 144°45′07″E	Hagåtña	Historic ifil-constructed house
10	Plaza de Espana	Plaza de Espana	May 1, 1974 (#74002302)	Saylor Street; 13°28′26″N 144°45′06″E	Hagåtña	
11	Spanish Dikes		November 19, 1974 (#74002303)	Northeast of Agana Springs; 13°27′48″N 144°45′57″E	Hagåtña	
12	Toves House	Toves House	February 8, 1985 (#85000410)	Marine Drive; 13°34′55″N 144°51′38″E	Hagåtña	
13	U.S. Naval Cemetery	U.S. Naval Cemetery	December 1, 2015 (#15000846)	Marine Corps Drive; 13°28′39″N 144°45′28″E	Hagåtña	
14	War in the Pacific National Historical Park	War in the Pacific National Historical Park	August 18, 1978 (#78003198)	Marine Drive; 13°23′12″N 144°39′28″E	Hagåtña	

=== Former listings ===
	Name on the Register	Image	Date listed	Date removed	Location	City or town	Description
1	Guam Legislative Building Site		January 23, 2003 (#02001722)	December 30, 2004	163 Chalan Santo Papa Juan Pablo Dos	Hagåtña	
2	Ungacta House		February 8, 1985 (#85000409)	December 31, 2004	334 Hernan Cortez	Hagåtña	Demolished in August 2002

== Humåtak ==
	Name on the Register	Image	Date listed	Location	Village	Description
1	Achugao Bay Site		August 19, 1985 (#75001912)	Address restricted	Humåtak	
2	Agaga	Agaga	June 11, 1975 (#75002155)	Address restricted	Humåtak	
3	Cetti Bay	Cetti Bay	November 21, 1974 (#74002036)	1.1 miles (1.8 km) north-northwest of Humåtak; 13°18′52″N 144°39′16″E	Humåtak	Archaeological site of a village, extending along most of the bay, also known as Jati and as Ati.
4	Creto Site	Creto Site	November 7, 1978 (#78003414)	Address restricted	Humåtak	
5	Fort Nuestra Señora de la Soledad	Fort Nuestra Señora de la Soledad	October 18, 1974 (#74002042)	South of Umatac of Guam Highway 40; 13°17′42″N 144°39′36″E	Humåtak	
6	Fort San Jose		May 1, 1974 (#74002041)	Northwest of Humåtak on Guam Highway 2; 13°18′02″N 144°39′31″E	Humåtak	
7	Fort Santo Angel		August 10, 1974 (#74002043)	Northwest corner of Umatac Bay; 13°17′56″N 144°39′39″E	Humåtak	
8	Fouha Bay	Fouha Bay	November 21, 1974 (#74002040)	Address restricted	Humåtak	
9	Machagden Point	Machagden Point	November 7, 1978 (#78003415)	Address restricted	Humåtak	
10	San Dionisio Church Ruins	San Dionisio Church Ruins	August 30, 1974 (#74002037)	Guam Highway 2; 13°17′57″N 144°39′47″E	Humåtak	
11	Francisco Q. Sanchez Elementary School		June 12, 1998 (#98000678)	Guam Highway 2; 13°17′57″N 144°39′49″E	Humåtak	
12	Sella Bay Site	Sella Bay Site	November 8, 1974 (#74002038)	Address restricted	Humåtak	
13	Umatac Outdoor Library	Umatac Outdoor Library	November 12, 1999 (#99001301)	Guam Highway 4; 13°17′59″N 144°39′38″E	Humåtak	
14	Umatac-Umatak Pillbox		March 4, 1991 (#88001881)	Address restricted	Humåtak	

== Inalåhan ==
	Name on the Register	Image	Date listed	Location	Village	Description
1	Aga Tongan Archaeological Site	Aga Tongan Archaeological Site	September 26, 2008 (#08000941)	Address restricted	Inalåhan	
2	Gadao's Cave	Gadao's Cave	November 19, 1974 (#74002309)	Address restricted	Inalåhan	
3	Inarajan Pillbox		March 4, 1991 (#88001890)	Guam Highway 4; 13°16′23″N 144°44′53″E	Inalåhan	
4	Inarajan Ridge		December 4, 1974 (#74002310)	Address restricted	Inalåhan	
5	Inarajan Village	Inarajan Village	November 7, 1977 (#77001569)	Guam Highway 4; 13°16′19″N 144°44′47″E	Inalåhan	
6	Malolos Site	Malolos Site	April 8, 1980 (#80004242)	Address restricted	Inalåhan	
7	Nomna Bay Site	Nomna Bay Site	December 27, 1974 (#74002311)	Address restricted	Inalåhan	
8	North Inarajan Site	North Inarajan Site	February 21, 1975 (#75002151)	Address restricted	Inalåhan	
9	Paulino Outdoor Oven		December 3, 2010 (#10000971)	Agfayan Point, south side of Bear Rock Lane; 13°15′59″N 144°44′24″E	Inalåhan	
10	Talofofo River Valley Site	Talofofo River Valley Site	December 27, 1974 (#74002312)	Address restricted	Inalåhan	
11	West Atate		December 4, 1974 (#74002313)	Address restricted	Inalåhan	

== Malesso ==
	Name on the Register	Image	Date listed	Location	Village	Description
1	Asmaile Point		November 7, 1978 (#78003413)	Address restricted	Malesso	
2	Merlyn G. Cook School	Merlyn G. Cook School	November 29, 1979 (#79003743)	Guam Highway 4; 13°16′07″N 144°39′51″E	Malesso	
3	Faha Massacre Site		August 27, 1991 (#91001091)	Off Guam Highway 4, south of Pigua Road; 13°16′18″N 144°39′49″E	Malesso	
4	Malesso Japanese Rice Mill	Malesso Japanese Rice Mill	November 28, 2012 (#12000973)	Jesus Barcinas Rd. 13°15′50″N 144°40′16″E	Malesso	
5	Malessu' Pillbox		March 4, 1991 (#88001872)	Talona Beach on Cocos Lagoon; 13°15′39″N 144°40′28″E	Malesso	
6	Merizo Bell Tower	Merizo Bell Tower	May 29, 1975 (#75002152)	Guam Highway 4; 13°15′57″N 144°40′05″E	Malesso	
7	Merizo Conbento	Merizo Conbento	September 17, 1974 (#74002315)	Guam Highway 4; 13°15′57″N 144°40′06″E	Malesso	
8	Tinta Massacre Site		November 26, 1991 (#91001720)	Espinosa Avenue; 13°15′49″N 144°40′40″E	Malesso	

== Mangilao ==
	Name on the Register	Image	Date listed	Location	Village	Description
1	Mochom	Mochom	December 4, 1974 (#74002314)	Address restricted	Mangilao	
2	Taogam Archeological Settlement	Taogam Archeological Settlement	April 15, 1980 (#80004243)	Address restricted	Mangilao	

== Mongmong-Toto-Maite ==
There are no properties listed on the National Register of Historic Places in Mongmong-Toto-Maite.

== Piti ==
	Name on the Register	Image	Date listed	Location	Village	Description
1	Atantano Shrine	Atantano Shrine	November 21, 1995 (#95001367)	300 feet (91 m) southeast of Guam Highway 1 (Marine Drive), north of junction with Guam Highway 2A; 13°25′20″N 144°40′34″E	Piti	
2	Piti Coastal Defense Guns	Piti Coastal Defense Guns	June 18, 1975 (#75001909)	East of junction of Guam Highway 1 and 11; 13°27′38″N 144°41′31″E	Piti	
3	Quan Outdoor Oven		December 3, 2010 (#10000970)	North side, J.C. Santos St. at J.C. Tuncap St. 13°27′50″N 144°41′36″E	Piti	
4	SMS Cormoran	SMS Cormoran	April 4, 1975 (#75002156)	Apra Harbor; 13°27′45″N 144°39′06″E	Piti	
5	Tokai Maru	Tokai Maru	July 14, 1988 (#88000967)	Apra Harbor, Naval Base Guam; 13°27′33″N 144°39′15″E	Piti	

== Sånta Rita-Sumai ==
	Name on the Register	Image	Date listed	Location	Village	Description
1	Dådi Beach Japanese Bunker		September 7, 2021 (#100006869)	Address restricted	Santa Rita vicinity	
2	Dobo Spring Latte Set Complex		September 7, 2021 (#100006870)	Address restricted	Santa Rita vicinity	
3	Ha. 62-76 Japanese midget attack submarine	Ha. 62-76 Japanese midget attack submarine	February 3, 1999 (#99001706)	Chapel Road near barracks 14, Commander Naval Forces Marianas; 13°25′40″N 144°38′46″E	Santa Rita	
4	Mount Tenjo Fortifications	Mount Tenjo Fortifications	March 13, 1979 (#79003745)	Northeast of Santa Rita; 13°25′10″N 144°41′49″E	Santa Rita	
5	Orote Field	Orote Field	June 18, 1975 (#75002149)	5 miles (8.0 km) north on Orote Peninsula, within Naval Base Guam. 13°26′07″N 144°38′22″E	Santa Rita	
6	Orote Historical Complex		October 23, 1979 (#79003744)	Naval Station Guam, northern tip of Orote Peninsula; 13°26′48″N 144°37′37″E	Santa Rita	
7	Sumay Cemetery	Sumay Cemetery	October 8, 1999 (#99001184)	Marine Drive, Commander Naval Forces Marianas; 13°26′09″N 144°39′16″E	Santa Rita	
8	Talisay Site-Latte' Saddok Talisai	Talisay Site-Latte' Saddok Talisai	November 5, 2014 (#14000892)	Address restricted	Santa Rita	
9	West Bona Site	West Bona Site	March 26, 1979 (#79003746)	Address restricted	Santa Rita	

== Sinajana ==
	Name on the Register	Image	Date listed	Location	Village	Description
1	Won Pat Outdoor Oven		December 3, 2010 (#10000969)	Between 114 and 126 Mansanita Ct. 13°27′43″N 144°45′15″E	Sinajana	

== Talo'fo'fo ==
	Name on the Register	Image	Date listed	Location	Village	Description
1	Aratama Maru	Aratama Maru	June 2, 1988 (#88000612)	Talofofo Bay; 13°20′05″N 144°46′02″E	Talofofo	Japanese freighter that lies at bottom of Talofofo Bay
2	Asquiroga Cave		May 6, 1976 (#76002277)	Address restricted	Talofofo	
3	Garapan Mount Pillbox		March 4, 1991 (#88001888)	Address restricted	Talofofo	
4	Mahlac Pictograph Cave	Mahlac Pictograph Cave	November 12, 2014 (#14000891)	Address restricted	Talofofo	
5	Mana Pillbox		March 4, 1991 (#88001886)	South shore of As Anite Cove; 13°20′27″N 144°46′12″E	Talofofo	
6	Matala' Pillbox		March 4, 1991 (#88001867)	Address restricted	Talofofo	
7	South Talofofo Site	South Talofofo Site	February 24, 1975 (#75002153)	Address restricted	Talofofo	
8	Talofofo-Talu'fofo' Pillbox		March 4, 1991 (#88001876)	South shore of the Ylig River; 13°21′53″N 144°46′02″E	Talofofo	
9	Tokcha' Pillbox		March 4, 1991 (#88001875)	Toghca Point shoreling, Ipan; 13°22′15″N 144°46′09″E	Talofofo	
10	Yokoi's Cave	Yokoi's Cave	January 16, 1980 (#80004244)	Address restricted	Talofofo	

== Tamuning ==
	Name on the Register	Image	Date listed	Location	Village	Description
1	As Sombreru Pillbox I		March 4, 1991 (#88001883)	Address restricted	Tamuning	
2	As Sombreru Pillbox II	As Sombreru Pillbox II	March 4, 1991 (#88001864)	South shore of Tumon Beach in Tumon Bay; 13°30′19″N 144°47′48″E	Tamuning	
3	As Sombreru Pillbox III	As Sombreru Pillbox III	March 4, 1991 (#88001887)	West of Matapang Park; 13°30′21″N 144°47′47″E	Tamuning	
4	Dungcas Beach Defense Guns	Dungcas Beach Defense Guns	December 22, 1976 (#76001965)	On Agana Bay, off Guam Highway 1; 13°29′31″N 144°46′31″E	Tamuning	
5	Fafai Beach Site		November 19, 1974 (#74002316)	Address restricted	Tamuning	
6	Gilan		October 26, 2015 (#99001185)	Address restricted	Tamuning	
7	Gongna Beach Gun Emplacement	Gongna Beach Gun Emplacement	March 4, 1991 (#88001897)	East San Vitores Drive; 13°31′32″N 144°48′15″E	Tamuning	
8	Gongna Beach Gun Mount		March 4, 1991 (#88001898)	East San Vitores Drive; 13°31′27″N 144°48′14″E	Tamuning	
9	Gongna Beach Mount Pillbox		March 4, 1991 (#88001894)	East San Vitores Drive; 13°31′24″N 144°48′15″E	Tamuning	
10	Ipao Pillbox I	Ipao Pillbox I	March 4, 1991 (#88001863)	West of Ypao Point; 13°30′19″N 144°47′01″E	Tamuning	
11	Ipao Pillbox II		March 4, 1991 (#88001873)	Address restricted	Tamuning	
12	Ipao Pillbox III		March 4, 1991 (#88001874)	Address restricted	Tamuning	
13	Naton Headland Fortification I		March 4, 1991 (#88001884)	Address restricted	Tamuning	
14	Naton Headland Fortification II		March 4, 1991 (#88001885)	Address restricted	Tamuning	
15	Oka Fortification		March 4, 1991 (#88001882)	Address restricted	Tamuning	
16	San Vitores Beach Japanese Fortification		March 4, 1991 (#88001891)	East San Vitores Drive; 13°31′00″N 144°48′20″E	Tamuning	Misspelled ("Sanvitores") in NHRP database. Correctly spelled in application.
17	San Vitores Martyrdom Site		October 31, 1975 (#75002154)	0.7 miles (1.1 km) south of Bijia Point off Guam Highway 4; 13°30′59″N 144°48′21″E	Tamuning	
18	Tomhum Cliffline Fortification I		March 4, 1991 (#88001895)	East San Vitores Drive; 13°30′23″N 144°48′20″E	Tamuning	
19	Tomhum Cliffline Fortification II		March 4, 1991 (#88001896)	East San Vitores Drive; 13°30′29″N 144°48′23″E	Tamuning	
20	Tomhum Cliffline Fortification III		March 4, 1991 (#88001868)	Address restricted	Tamuning	
21	Tomhum Pillbox I		March 4, 1991 (#88001893)	East San Vitores Drive; 13°30′47″N 144°48′12″E	Tamuning	
22	Tomhum Pillbox II		March 4, 1991 (#88001866)	East San Vitores Drive; 13°30′33″N 144°48′02″E	Tamuning	
23	Tomhum Pillbox III		March 4, 1991 (#88001865)	East San Vitores Drive; 13°30′23″N 144°47′52″E	Tamuning	
24	Tonhum Fortification I		March 4, 1991 (#88001870)	Address restricted	Tamuning	
25	Ypao Beach Archeological Site	Ypao Beach Archeological Site	May 24, 1984 (#84000889)	Address restricted	Tamuning	

== Yigo ==
	Name on the Register	Image	Date listed	Location	Village	Description
1	Chaqui'an Massacre Site	Chaqui'an Massacre Site	April 12, 2016 (#16000129)	Chalan Emsley; 13°34′17″N 144°53′20″E	Yigo	
2	Cruz Water Catchment		November 14, 1994 (#94001310)	53 feet (16 m) south Guam Highway 9, southeast of Pott's Junction; 13°35′05″N 144°51′58″E	Yigo	
3	Hanum Site	Hanum Site	November 7, 1978 (#78003416)	Address restricted	Yigo	
4	Jinapsan Site		December 27, 1974 (#74002317)	Address restricted	Yigo	
5	Mataguac Hill Command Post		June 10, 1975 (#75002122)	Off of Guam Highway 1; 13°32′36″N 144°52′55″E	Yigo	
6	Pagat Site	Pagat Site	March 13, 1974 (#74002318)	Address restricted	Yigo	
7	Talagi Pictograph Cave	Talagi Pictograph Cave	March 24, 2004 (#04001240)	Andersen Air Force Base; Address Restricted	Dededo and Yigo	
8	Torre Water Catchment		November 14, 1994 (#94001311)	Hatsuho Golf Course; 13°34′55″N 144°51′47″E	Yigo	

== Yona ==
	Name on the Register	Image	Date listed	Location	Village	Description
1	Baza Outdoor Oven		December 3, 2010 (#10000972)	West end of Beatrice Baza Rd. 13°24′13″N 144°46′04″E	Yona	
2	Ilik River Fortification I		March 4, 1991 (#88001869)	Address restricted	Yona	
3	Ilik River Fortification II		March 4, 1991 (#88001871)	Shore of Ylig Point; 13°23′11″N 144°46′23″E	Yona	
4	Light Model Tank No. 95		December 19, 1979 (#79003107)	Southwest of Yona on Cross Island Road; 13°22′47″N 144°45′25″E	Yona	
5	Manenggon Concentration Camp		June 14, 2016 (#16000362)	Address restricted	Yona	Designated a National Historic Landmark in 2024.
6	South Pulantat Site	South Pulantat Site	March 26, 1979 (#79003747)	Address restricted	Yona	

== See also ==
- List of United States National Historic Landmarks in United States commonwealths and territories, associated states, and foreign states
