= Fort Santo Angel =

- U.S. National Register of Historic Places
- Location within Guam
- Location: NW corner of Umatac Bay, Umatac, Guam
- Coordinates: 13°17′50″N 144°39′22″E
- Area: 1 acre (0.40 ha)
- NRHP reference No.: 74002043
- Added to NRHP: August 30, 1974

Fort Santo Angel was a Spanish fortress on the island of Guam, now a United States territory. Located on a promontory on the west coast of the island in the northernmost part the Umatac Bay in Umatac, the fort's remains are among the oldest known Spanish-era structures on the island; a fort is documented to have been standing here since 1742, and to still be in use in the early 19th century. The fort provided protection for the anchorage used by Spanish galleons on the trade route between Manila (then in the Spanish East Indies) and Acapulco, Mexico (then part of New Spain). Perched on a monolith, there remains a plaza 40 by 24 feet (12.2 m × 7.3 m) of flagstone surrounded by a manposteria (coral mixed with cement) wall 1 foot (30 cm) high and 18 inches (46 cm) thick. The remains of a guardroom and a second, smaller platform, lie to its west.

== See also ==
- National Register of Historic Places listings in Guam
