= Mataguac Hill Command Post =

- U.S. National Register of Historic Places
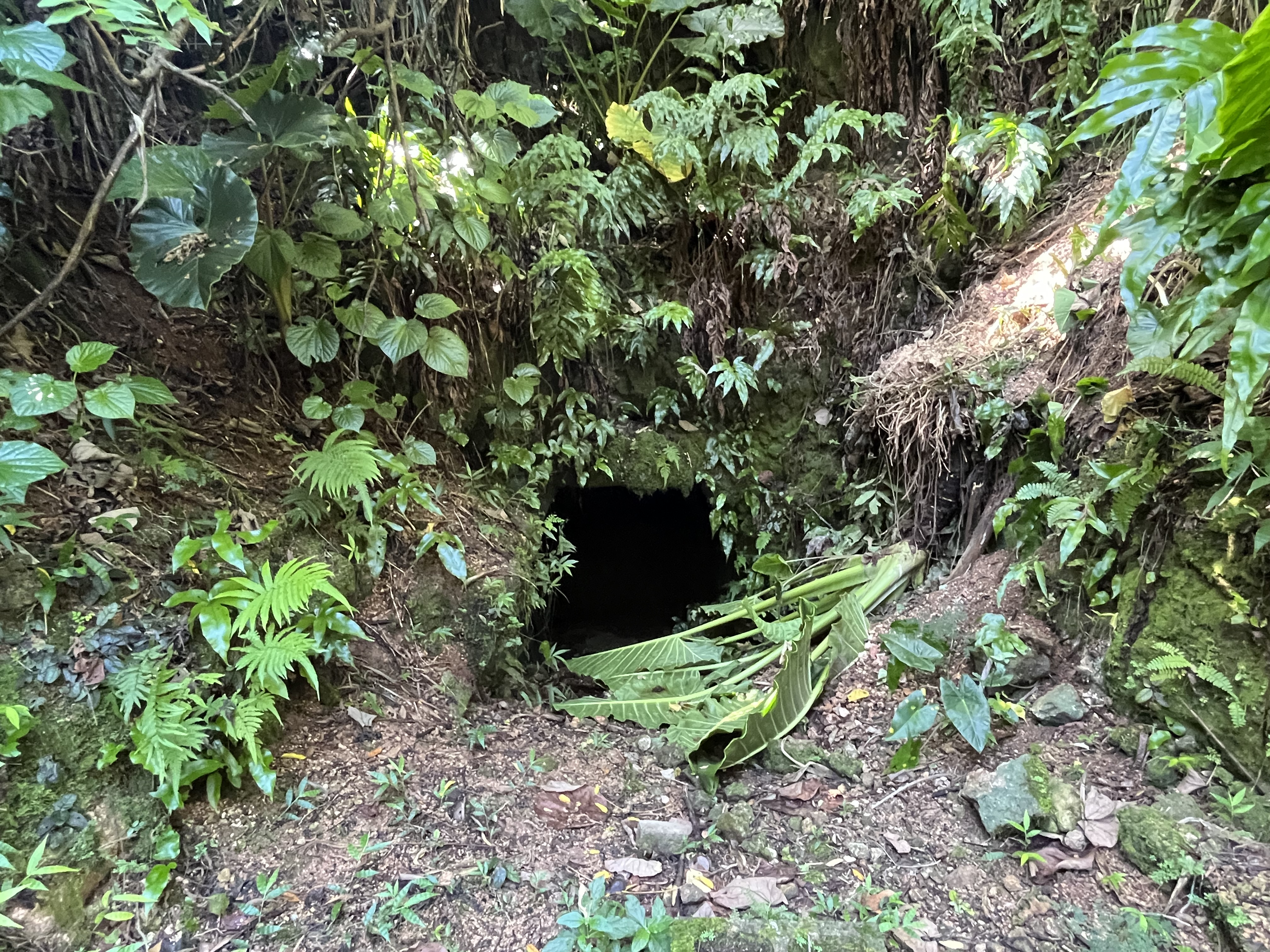

- Location within Guam
- Location: Off of Guam Highway 1
- Nearest city: Yigo, Guam
- Coordinates: 13°32′36″N 144°52′55″E
- Area: 5 acres (2.0 ha)
- Built: 1944
- NRHP reference No.: 75002122
- Added to NRHP: June 10, 1975

The Mataguac Hill Command Post, near Yigo, Guam, has significance from 1944 during the Battle of Guam. It was the location of "the last organized resistance by the Japanese to the American liberation of Guam during World War II and therefore is considered a highlight of the invasion of Guam."

It was listed on the National Register of Historic Places in 1975. The listing's two contributing structures are two concrete bunkers built by the Japanese military early in 1944, in a small gully at a location where fresh water was present and where thick bamboo groves may have concealed the area from American military air reconnaissance and attack. The smaller bunker is 12.4 by 5.8 metres (41 ft × 19 ft) and about 2.5 metres (8.2 ft) tall. The main portion of the larger bunker, about 10 metres (33 ft) away, is 15 by 4 metres (49 ft × 13 ft) and about 4 metres (13 ft) tall; it is L-shaped.

It was used as a command post by Japanese Lt. Gen. Hideyoshi Obata. The position was attacked on August 11, 1944 by the 306th Infantry Regiment of the 77th Infantry Division of the U.S. Army. "Throwing white phosphorus grenades and using pole charges and more than 400 blocks of TNT, they blew up the front of the caverns, closing them." The bunkers were opened by American engineers three days later and 60 bodies were found, including that of General Obata.

There are other abandoned concrete structures to hold water from Mataguac Spring, not far away, that were built by the U.S. Army Corps of Engineers, after World War II.

== See also ==
- National Register of Historic Places listings in Guam
