= Dungcas Beach Defense Guns =

- U.S. National Register of Historic Places
- U.S. Historic district
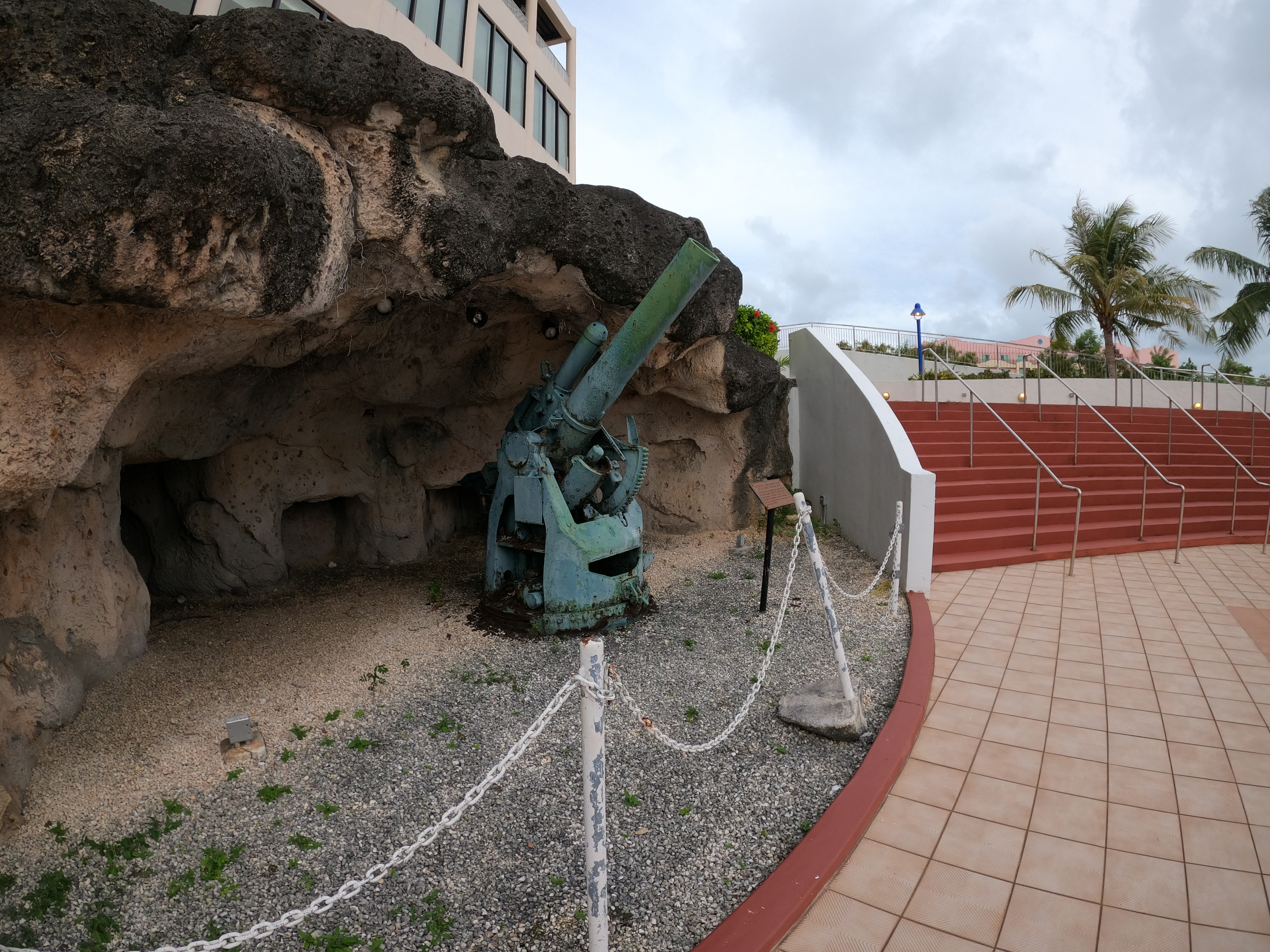
- One of two Japanese short 20cm dual purpose guns as it appeared on June 15, 2020 on the premises of the Onward Beach Resort. The gun was removed from its original location in the early 1990s during the development of the hotel and returned to fiberglass mockups of the fortifications that are now visible on the pool deck.

- Location within Guam
- Location: On Agana Bay off Rte. 1, Tamuning, Guam
- Coordinates: 13°29′26″N 144°46′22″E
- Area: 0.5 acres (0.20 ha)
- Built: 1942
- NRHP reference No.: 76001965
- Added to NRHP: December 22, 1976

The Dungcas Beach Defense Guns are an old World War II Japanese fortification in the United States territory of Guam. It consists of a tunnel dug in the coral limestone of the cliffs overlooking the beach on the northeast east side of Hagåtña Bay on the west side of the island. The tunnel has two guns mounted at openings facing the beach. This fortification was built by the 48th Independent Mixed Brigade of the 29th Division of the Imperial Japanese Army, during its occupation of the island 1941–44. The guns from this position were probably fired on landing Allied forces during the 1944 Battle of Guam, in which the United States retook the island.

The guns at this fortification are Japanese short 20cm 12 cal. Model 3 Dual Purpose Naval Guns. The guns were removed from their original locations in 1992 to be treated for corrosion and to enable the development of the Onward Beach Resort. They were returned to fiberglass copies of the original emplacements and the tunnels were destroyed. Both guns are on display at the pool area of the Onward Beach Resort as of June 15, 2020.

The fortification was listed on the National Register of Historic Places in 1976.

== See also ==
- National Register of Historic Places listings in Guam
