= Light Model Tank No. 95 (Guam) =

- U.S. National Register of Historic Places
- Location within Guam
- Nearest city: Yona, Guam
- Coordinates: 13°22′50″N 144°45′26″E
- Area: 0.1 acres (0.040 ha)
- NRHP reference No.: 79003107
- Added to NRHP: December 19, 1979

The Light Model Tank No. 95 is a relic of the Japanese occupation of the US territory of Guam during World War II. It is the remains of a Type 95 Ha-Go light tank, that was in a highly visible location on Cross Island Road when it was listed on the National Register of Historic Places in 1979. At that time little more than the tank body remained, its turret and gun having been removed and sold for scrap. It was at that time one of three such tanks known to survive on the island.

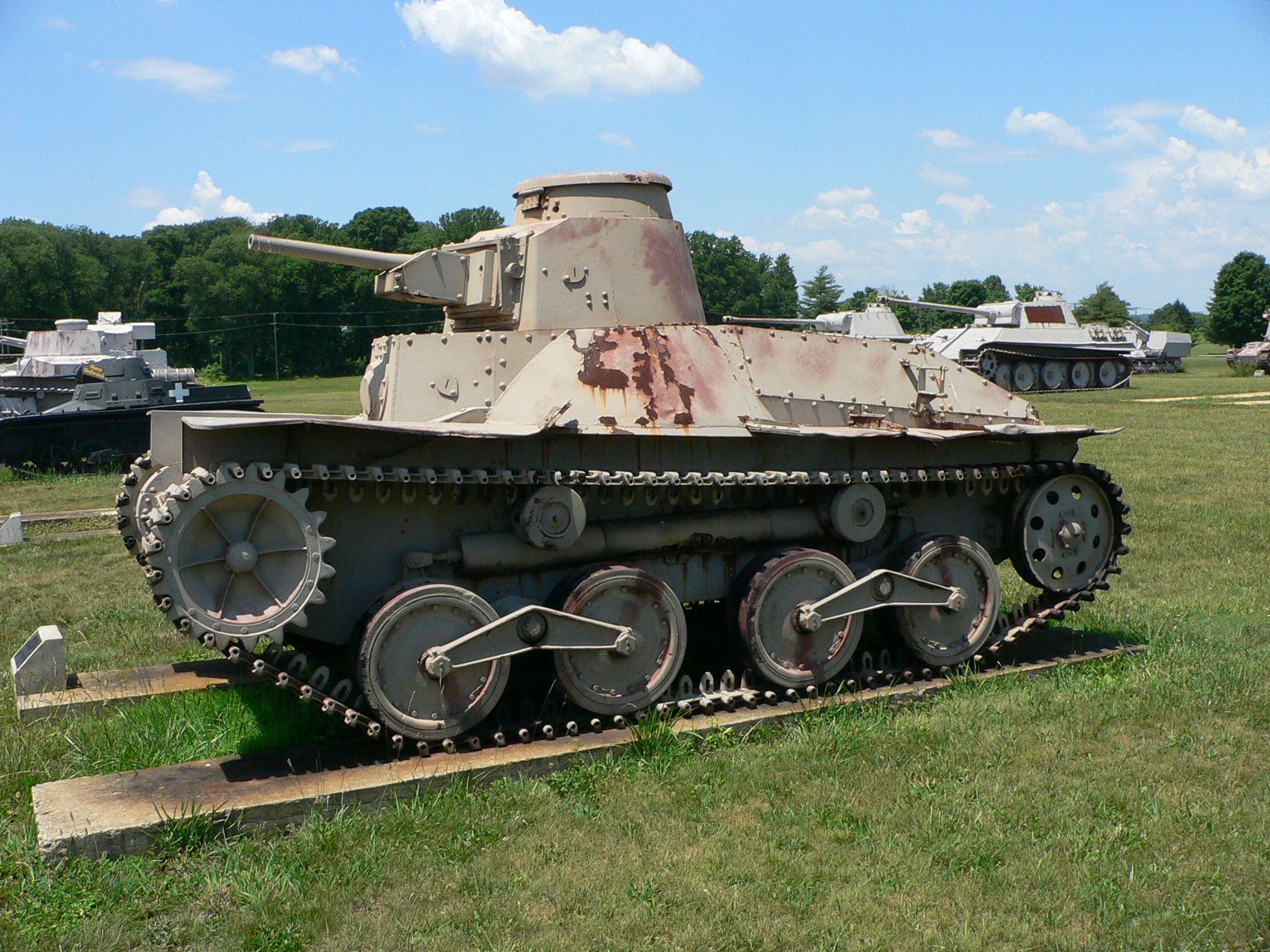
This restored Type 95 is on display at the United States Army Ordnance Museum.

== See also ==
- National Register of Historic Places listings in Guam
