= Mahlac Pictograph Cave =

Rock art site on the island of Guam

- U.S. National Register of Historic Places
- Location: Address restricted
- Nearest city: Talofofo, Guam
- Area: less than one acre
- NRHP reference No.: 14000891
- Added to NRHP: November 12, 2014

The Mahlac Pictograph Cave is a rock art site on the island of Guam. It is located high in the southern mountains of the island, and contains more than 40 images, rendered in paints that are white, red, brown, and black. The art was analyzed in 2011, and a radiocarbon date of c. 600 CE was obtained from a paint sample. The meaning of the art is a subject of debate.

The cave was listed on the National Register of Historic Places in 2014.

== Important Bird Area ==
Mahlac Cave, along with two other caves in the vicinity (Fachi and Maemong), has been recognised as an Important Bird Area (IBA) by BirdLife International because it supports a nesting population of some 700–800 Mariana swiftlets.

== See also ==
- National Register of Historic Places listings in Guam
