= Pago Bay Japanese pillboxes =

- Pagu' Pillbox I
- U.S. National Register of Historic Places
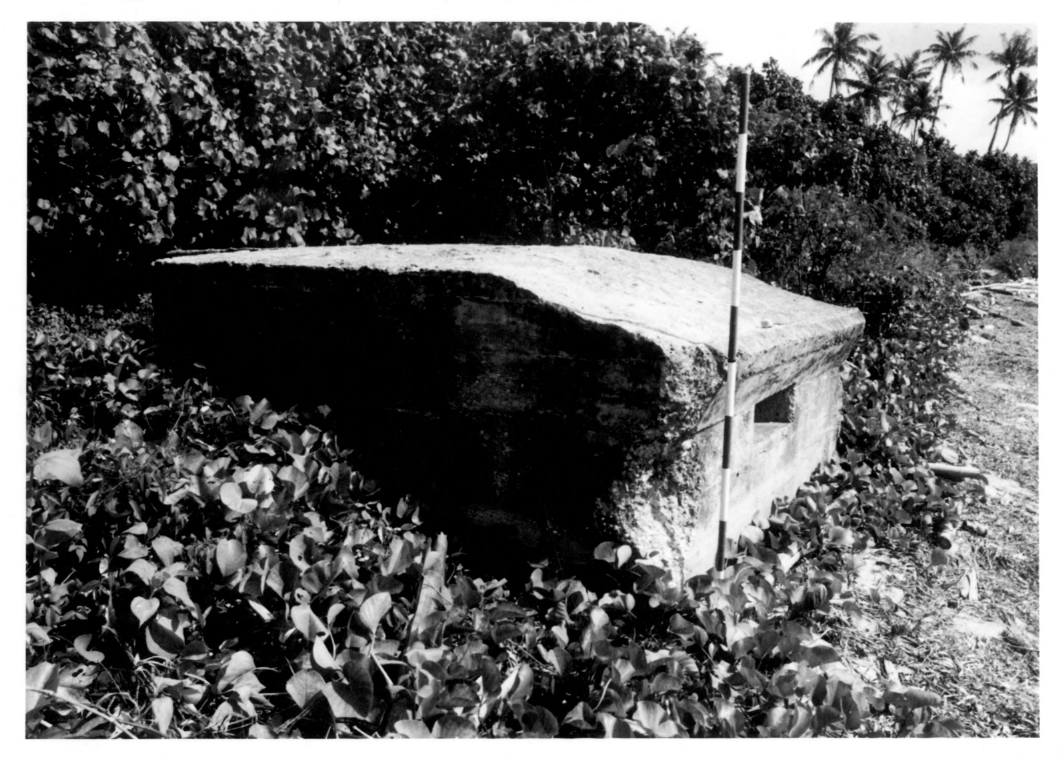

- Location within Guam
- Location: Shore of Pago Bay, Chalan Pago-Ordot, Guam
- Coordinates: 13°25′21″N 144°46′56″E
- Area: less than one acre
- MPS: Japanese Coastal Defense Fortifications on Guam TR
- NRHP reference No.: 88001878
- Added to NRHP: March 4, 1991

- Pagu' Pillbox II
- U.S. National Register of Historic Places
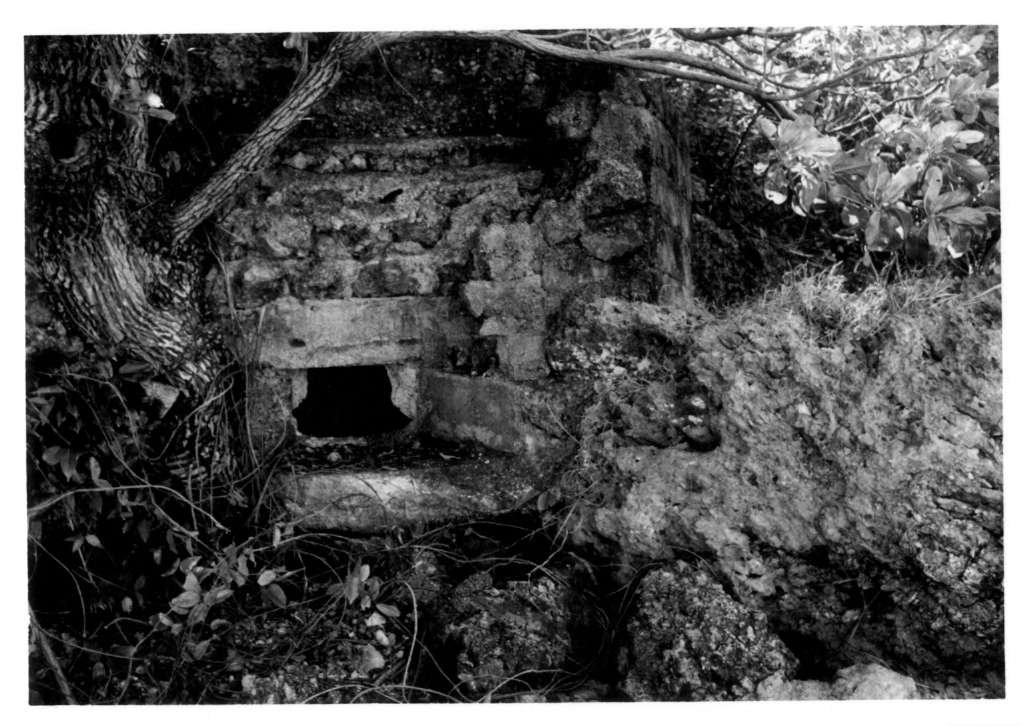

- Location within Guam
- Location: Shore of Pago Bay, Chalan Pago-Ordot, Guam
- Coordinates: 13°25′2″N 144°46′57″E
- Area: less than one acre
- MPS: Japanese Coastal Defense Fortifications on Guam TR
- NRHP reference No.: 88001879
- Added to NRHP: March 4, 1991

The Pago Bay Japanese pillboxes are a pair of World War II-era coastal defense pillboxes located on the shore of Pago Bay, located on the central east coast of Guam. Built out of steel-reinforced concrete mixed with coral stone, these two structures were built by Japanese defenders during their occupation of the island between 1941 and 1944. They were listed on the National Register of Historic Places in 1991 as Pagu' Pillbox I and Pagu' Pillbox II. Neither of these would have seen substantial action during the 1944 liberation of Guam, whose military activities were focused on the western, central, and northern parts of the island.

== Pillbox I ==
The first pillbox is located about 120 metres (390 ft) north of the mouth of the Pago River, and is about 1 metre (3.3 ft) above the mean high tide line. It is roughly 4.0 by 2.7 metres (13.1 ft × 8.9 ft) in size, and is partially filled with sand. Its gun port is located in the south wall, with a view over Pago Bay, and there is a window in the western wall, overlooking the river. The main entrance is on the north side, providing access to the single chamber of the interior. The roof is about 0.35 metres (1.1 ft) thick, with an overhang on the south side. At the time of its National Register listings in 1991, it was partially buried and filled with sand.
Media related to Pagu' Pillbox I at Wikimedia Commons

== Pillbox II ==
The second pillbox is located about 550 metres (1,800 ft) west of Pago Point on the south side of the bay, also about 1 meter inland from the high tide line. It is a roughly hexagonal structure, with an open entrance on the west side, and gun ports facing north and northwest. The north wall is about 1 metre (3.3 ft) thick, in part due to the addition of boulders on the outside. In one section of the northwest wall there are impressions of tree trunks, suggesting trees were used as part of the form for its construction or that logs were incorporated into the structure. The roof is 0.75 metres (2.5 ft) thick, with two vents. The floor consists of coral and limestone rocks.
Media related to Pagu' Pillbox II at Wikimedia Commons

== See also ==
- National Register of Historic Places listings in Guam
