= Guzman Water Catchment =

- U.S. National Register of Historic Places
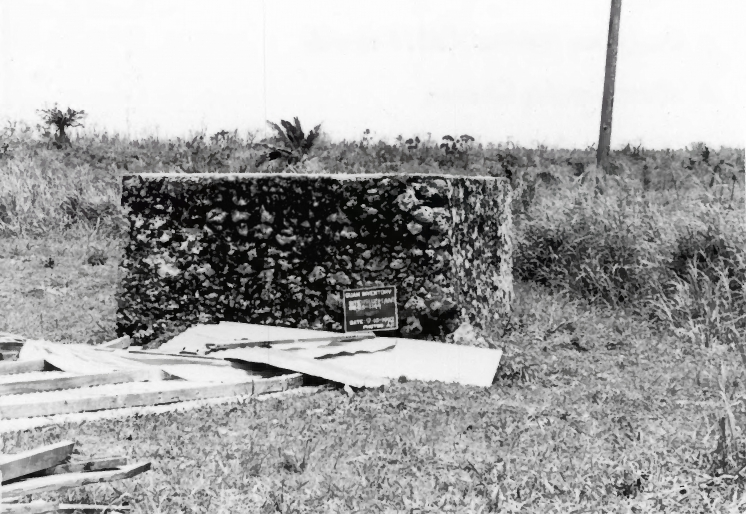

- Location within Guam
- Location: 0.25 mi. S of GU 8 and 0.25 E of GU 10, Nalao, Barrigada, Guam
- Coordinates: 13°28′5″N 144°48′22″E
- Area: less than one acre
- Built: 1910
- Built by: Baldobino Charfauros
- MPS: Water Catchments MPS
- NRHP reference No.: 94001312
- Added to NRHP: November 14, 1994

The Guzman Water Catchment is a historic private water supply structure in the rural Nalao area of the village of Barrigada in the United States territory of Guam. It is a roughly rectangular structure, measuring 4.4 by 2.84 by 1.52 metres (14.4 ft × 9.3 ft × 5.0 ft), with an open top. It is fashioned out of locally gathered stone joined with lime-cement mortar. It was built in 1910 by Baldobino Charfauros on family-owned land, and is one of the oldest surviving rural catchment basins on the island. It is further distinguished from other catchment basins in that it has a substantial floor. These types of structures made it possible for Guamanian families to live on rural holdings where water access was otherwise a significant problem.

The structure was listed on the National Register of Historic Places in 1994.

== See also ==
- National Register of Historic Places listings in Guam
