= Merizo Conbento =

- U.S. National Register of Historic Places
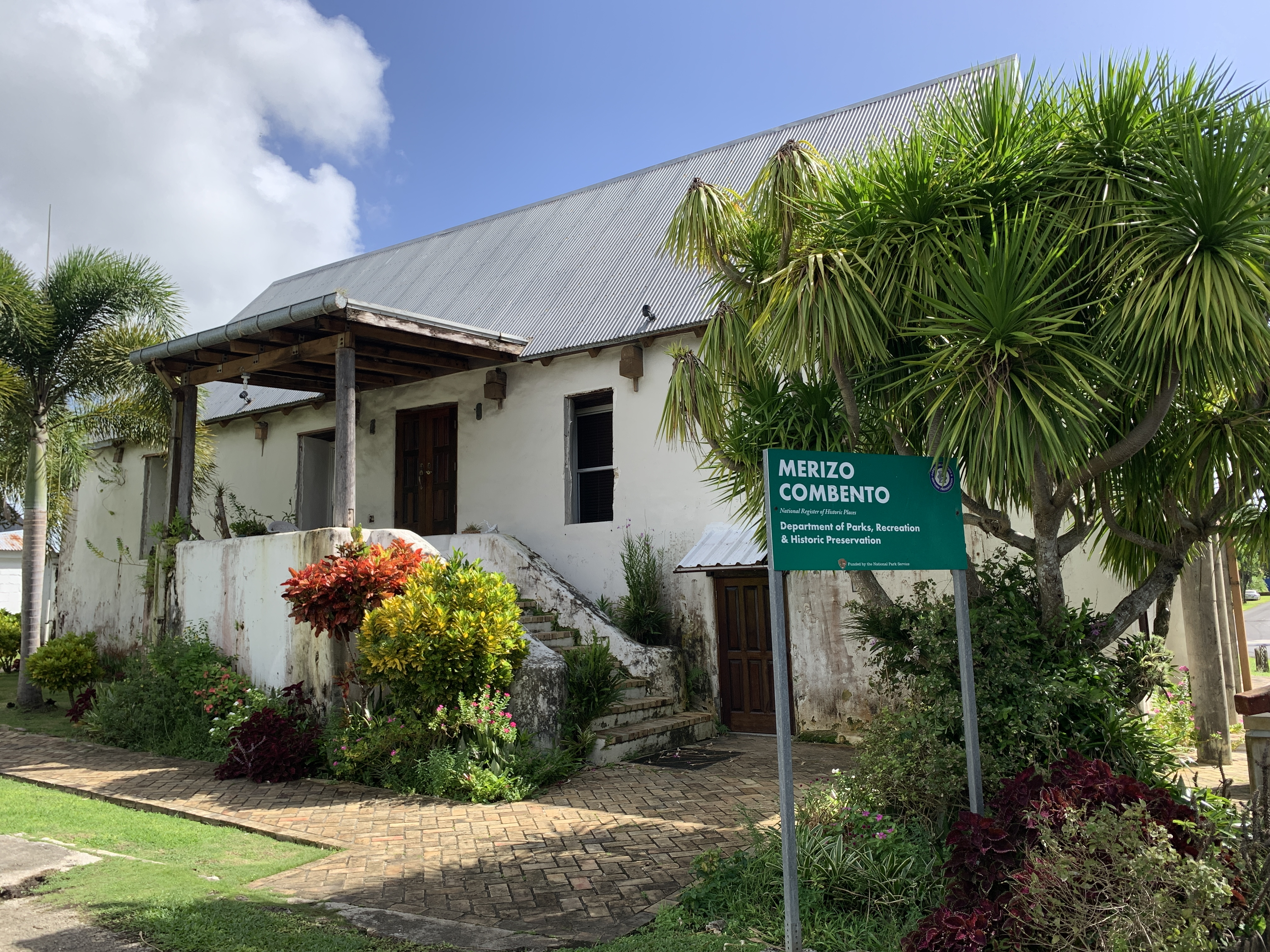

- Location within Guam
- Location: Guam Highway 4, Merizo, Guam
- Coordinates: 13°15′52″N 144°39′58″E
- Area: 1 acre (0.40 ha)
- Built: 1856
- NRHP reference No.: 74002315
- Added to NRHP: September 17, 1974

The Merizo Conbento is a historic building on Guam Route 4 in Malesso on the United States territory of Guam. Built in 1856, it is the oldest known, continually occupied building on the island.

The Conbento is a two-story structure of concrete and ifit (Intsia bijuga) wood with a gabled corrugated-metal roof, and a large set of concrete stairs leading to the main level above a raised basement. The present-day exterior is a faithful representation of the building's original appearance, with the exception of the roofing, and the walls once made of mampostería (coral mixed with lime mortar) remain inside the structure. It was built as a parish house for Merizo and neighboring Humåtak, and saw use as a military post and prison during the Japanese occupation of Guam during World War II.

The building was listed on the National Register of Historic Places in 1974.

== See also ==
- National Register of Historic Places listings in Guam
