= Ipao Pillbox I =

- U.S. National Register of Historic Places
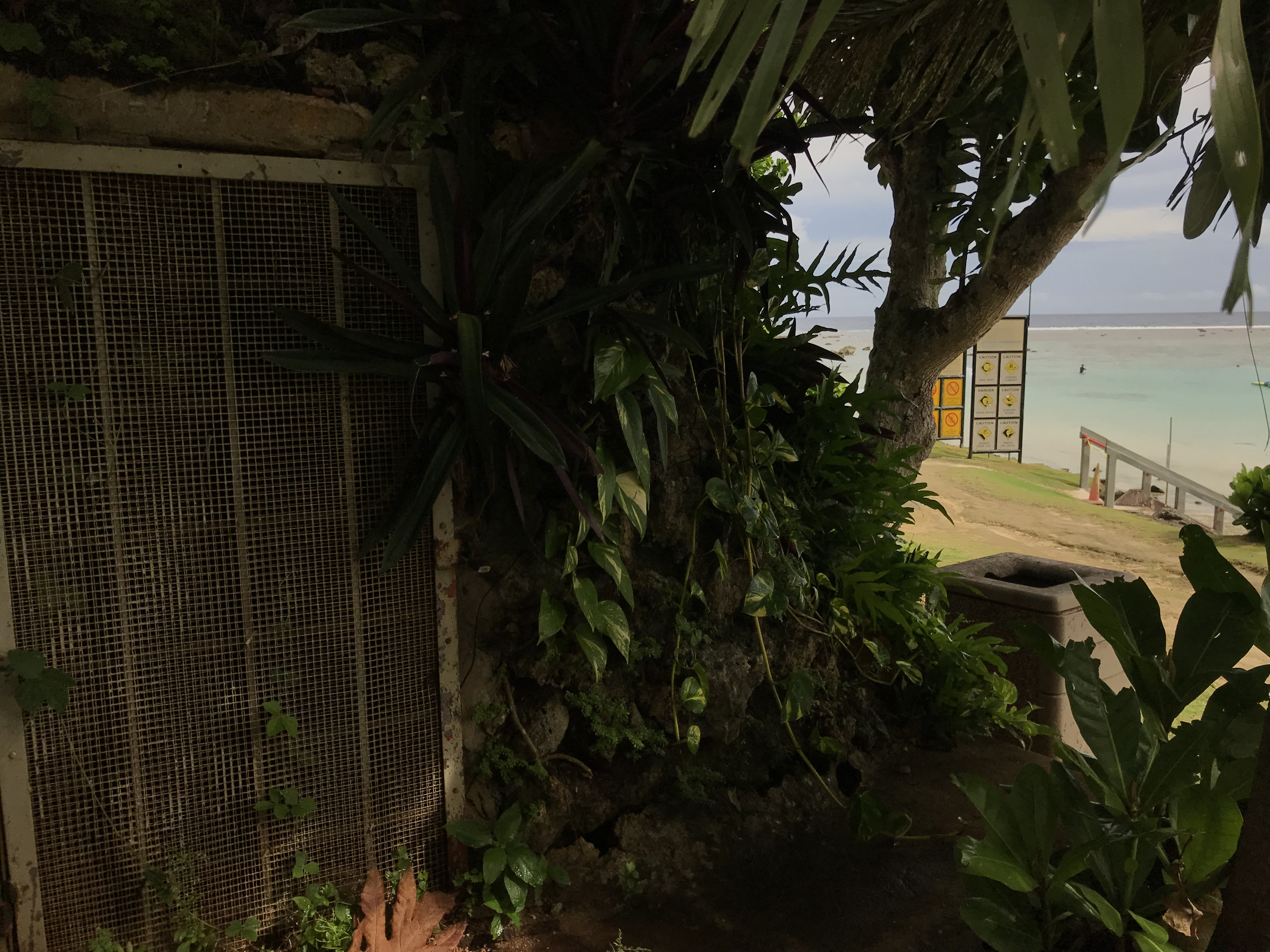

- Location within Guam
- Location: W of Tumon on Ypao Point, Tumon, Guam
- Coordinates: 13°30′22″N 144°47′1″E
- Area: less than one acre
- MPS: Japanese Coastal Defense Fortifications on Guam TR
- NRHP reference No.: 88001863
- Added to NRHP: March 4, 1991

The Ipao Pillbox I is one of three surviving World War II-era fortifications on Ypao Point, located west of Tumon Bay on the west side of the island of Guam. It is built into the limestone cliff overlooking the beach on the property of the Hilton Hotel, about 17 metres (56 ft) in from the high tide line. Its walls are fashioned out of coral rock and cement, varying in thickness from 1 metre (3.3 ft) to 1.6 metres (5.2 ft). Its entrance is on the east wall, and its gun port faces north, overlooking Ypao Channel. Parts of the structure have been restored.

The structure was listed on the National Register of Historic Places in 1991.

== See also ==
- National Register of Historic Places listings in Guam
