= Fouha Bay Site =

Archaeological site in Guam

- Fouha Bay
- U.S. National Register of Historic Places
- Location: Address restricted
- Nearest city: Umatac, Guam
- Area: 11 acres (4.5 ha)
- NRHP reference No.: 74002040
- Added to NRHP: November 21, 1974

The Fouha Bay Site is a prehistoric archaeological site near the village of Umatac on the southwestern coast of Guam.

First identified in 1977 during a systematic survey by archaeologist Fred Reinman, the site was radiocarbon dated to CE 1200–1400. However, differences in the rate of sediment deposition along stream and river banks make these dates uncertain. Because of a proportionally larger number of archaeological sites in the geologically different parts of eastern Guam, this site is significant in understanding how deposition rates affect site dating methods.

The site was listed on the National Register of Historic Places in 1974.

== See also ==
- National Register of Historic Places listings in Guam
