= Inarajan Pillbox =

- U.S. National Register of Historic Places
- Location within Guam
- Nearest city: Inarajan, Guam
- Coordinates: 13°16′26″N 144°44′54″E
- Area: less than one acre
- MPS: Japanese Coastal Defense Fortifications on Guam TR
- NRHP reference No.: 88001890
- Added to NRHP: March 4, 1991

The Inarajan Pillbox is a World War II-era defensive fortification near the mouth of Inarajan Bay in the United States territory of Guam. Set on a limestone outcrop on the south side of the bay, the fortification occupies a natural niche in the formation, with a wall of piled coral rocks and cement covering part of the opening. This wall is about 1.8 metres (5.9 ft) long, 2.0 metres (6.6 ft) high, and 1.0 metre (3.3 ft) thick. A cement gunport is set in the wall, about 0.75 metres (2.5 ft) above ground level. This fortification was built by Japanese soldiers occupying Guam between 1941 and 1944. The structure was listed on the National Register of Historic Places in 1991, as "Inalahan Pillbox".
