= Pagat Site =

- U.S. National Register of Historic Places
- Location: Address restricted
- Nearest city: Yigo, Guam
- Area: 180 acres (73 ha)
- NRHP reference No.: 74002318
- Added to NRHP: March 13, 1974

The Pagat Site is a large archaeological site in northeastern Guam. The site's major visible features are latte stone house sites, but it also contains pre-Latte period artifacts. Other surface features include refuse middens, stone mortar and grinding sites rock shelters. Items found during archaeological excavation include pottery remains, fish hooks, stone tools and weapons, beads, and several human burial sites. The site has been involved in contentious local debates over land use and preservation.

The site was listed on the National Register of Historic Places in 1974.

== See also ==
- National Register of Historic Places listings in Guam
