= San Vitores Martyrdom Site =

- U.S. National Register of Historic Places
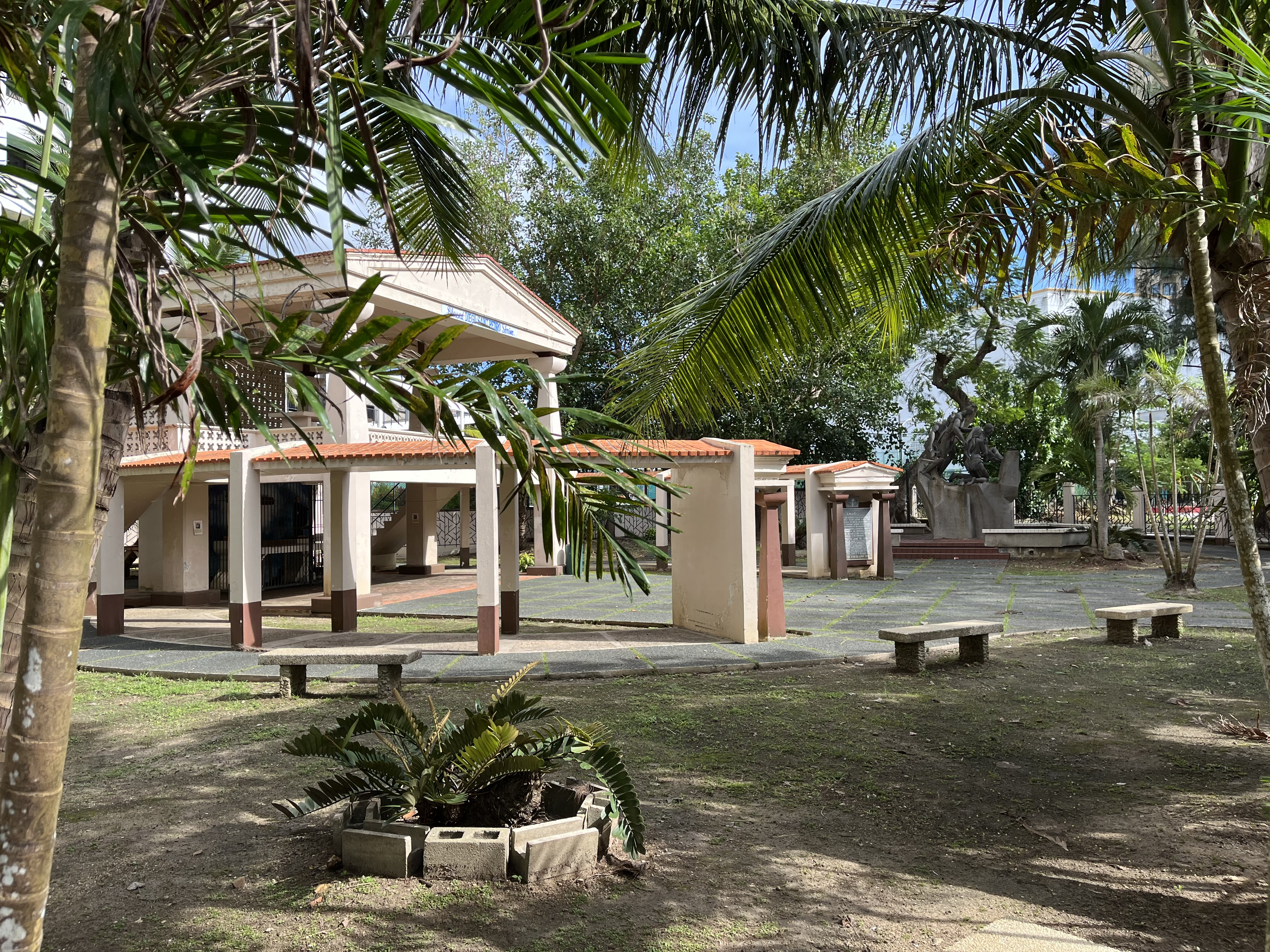

- Location within Guam
- Location: 0.7 miles south of Bijia Point off Rte. 4, Tamuning, Guam
- Coordinates: 13°30′59″N 144°48′21″E
- NRHP reference No.: 75002154
- Added to NRHP: October 31, 1975

The San Vitores Martyrdom Site, located 0.7 miles south of Bijia Point off Guam Highway 4 in Tamuning, Guam, has significance from 1672. It was listed on the National Register of Historic Places in 1975.

It is an important site in marking where Father Diego Luis de San Vitores was killed, and for association with the Spanish-Chamorro Wars against the imposition of Catholic Christianity in Guam. At the time of NRHP listing, the site was marked by a wooden cross and by a historical plaque placed there in 1940.
