= San Vitores Beach Japanese Fortification =

- U.S. National Register of Historic Places
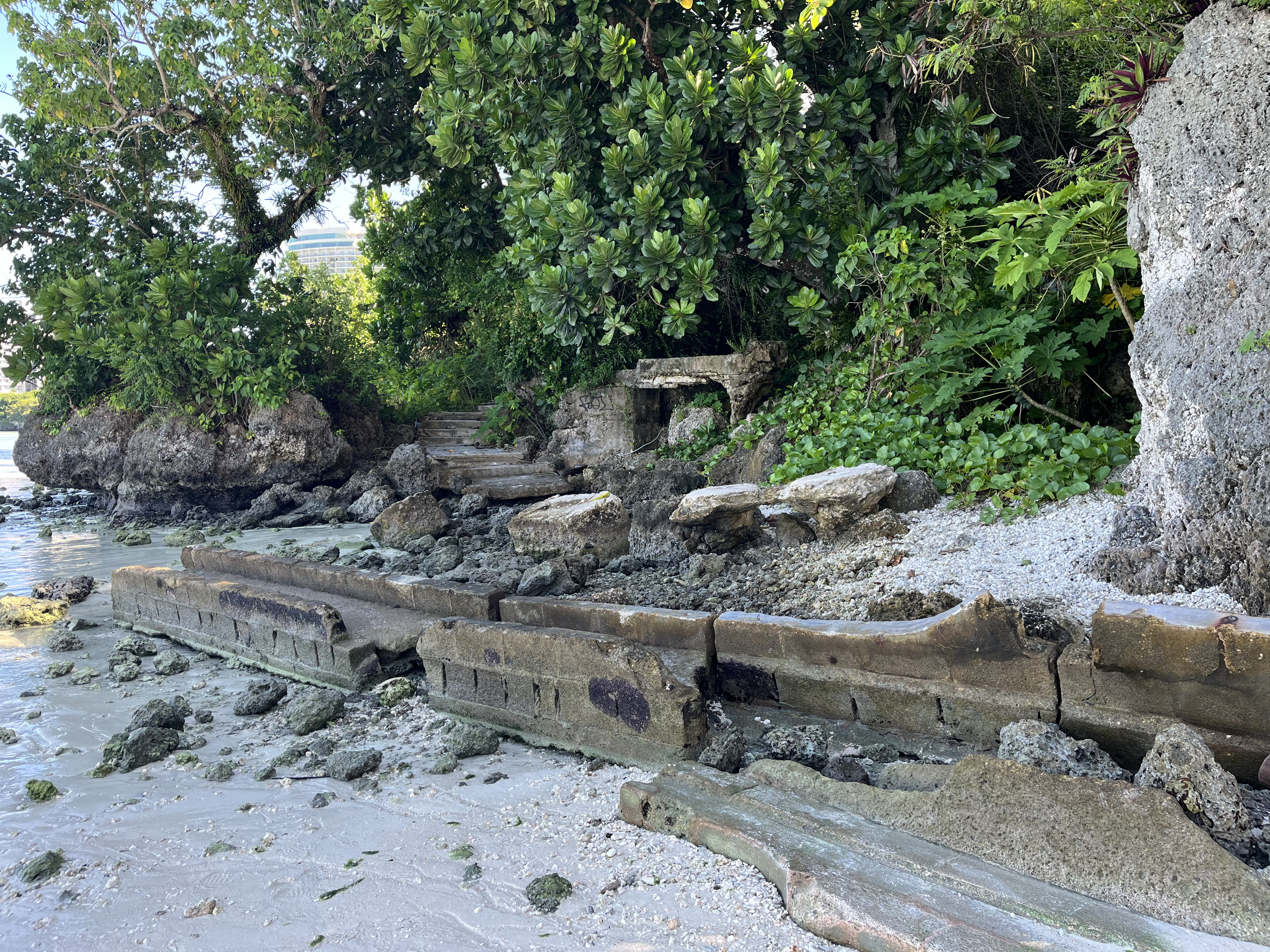

- Location within Guam
- Nearest city: Tumon, Guam
- Coordinates: 13°30′54″N 144°48′11″E
- Area: less than one acre
- MPS: Japanese Coastal Defense Fortifications on Guam TR
- NRHP reference No.: 88001891
- Added to NRHP: March 4, 1991

The San Vitores Beach Japanese Fortification are the remains of World War II-era defensive positions facing the beach of Tumon Bay on the west side of the island of Guam. Located near the stairs to the beach of the Guam Reef Hotel are the remains of two concrete pillboxes built by Japanese defenders during the occupation period 1941–44. One structure, of which little more than a gun embrasure is discernible, is located in the limestone cliff about 10 metres (33 ft) inland from the high tide line, and a second is located about 10 meters south and 8 meters further inland, with only a section of roof slab and supporting columns recognizable.

The defenses were listed on the National Register of Historic Places in 1991. The beach is named after Diego Luis de San Vitores, who was martyred in Tumon Bay.

== See also ==
- National Register of Historic Places listings in Guam
