= San Dionisio Church Ruins =

- U.S. National Register of Historic Places
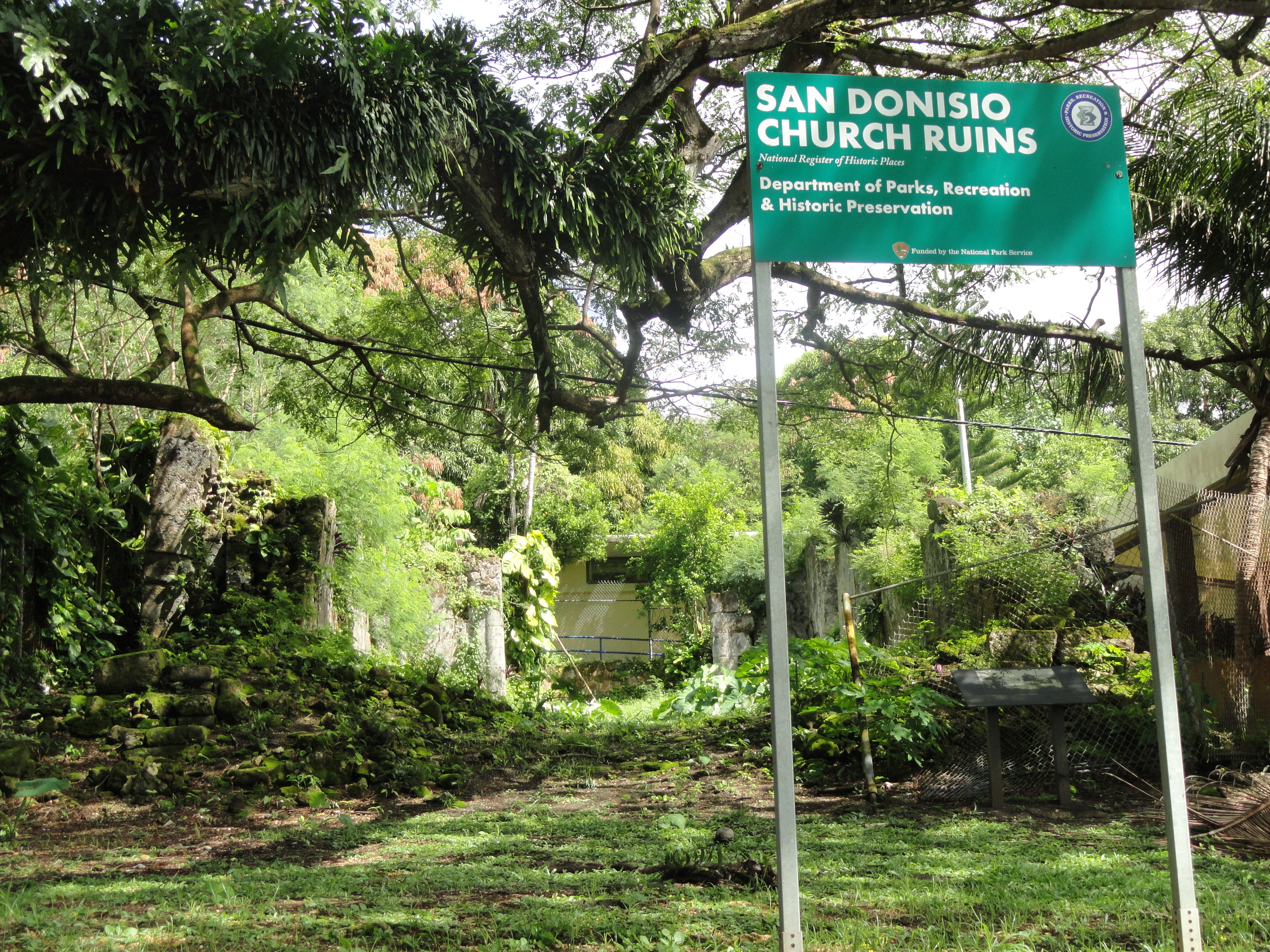

- Location within Guam
- Location: Rte. 2, Umatac, Guam
- Coordinates: 13°17′51″N 144°39′39″E
- Area: 0.6 acres (0.24 ha)
- Built: 1862
- NRHP reference No.: 74002037
- Added to NRHP: August 30, 1974

The San Dionisio Church Ruins are a historic ruins on Route 2 in Umatac, Guam. They are the remains of a church that was built in 1862 and destroyed by an earthquake in 1892. It was built out of manposteria (coral stone mixed with lime mortar), and the surviving elements including buttresses rising to a height of 13 feet (4.0 m). The ruins are the only surviving remnant of the Spanish colonial headquarters complex that stood in this area. The first San Dionisio Church was constructed in 1681, but rebuilt after a fire three years later. That church was destroyed in 1849 by an earthquake, and portions may have been used in construction of the 1862 building. A new church was built in 1939. The ruins were added to the National Register of Historic Places in 1974.

== See also ==
- National Register of Historic Places listings in Guam
