= Agat Invasion Beach =

- U.S. National Register of Historic Places
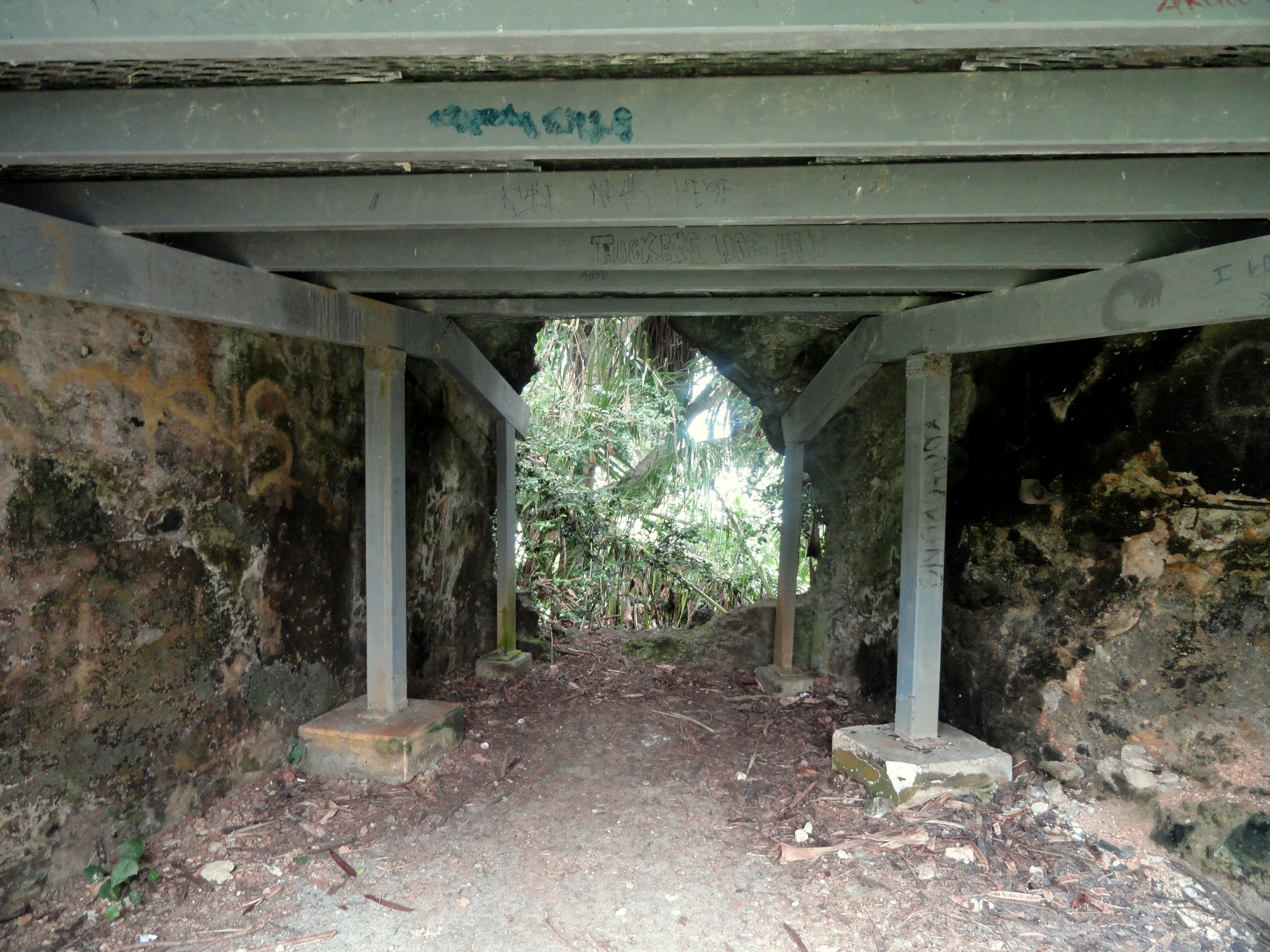
- Interior of the bunker at Ga'an Point

- Location within Guam
- Location: Coastline northwest of Agat from Togcha Beach south to Bangi Point
- Nearest city: Agat, Guam
- Coordinates: 13°23′7″N 144°39′18″E
- Area: 95 acres (38 ha)
- Built: 1944
- NRHP reference No.: 75001913
- Added to NRHP: March 4, 1975

The Agat Invasion Beach is a historic site in the village of Agat, Guam. The beaches of Agat were one of the landing sites of American forces in the 1944 Battle of Guam, in which the island was retaken from occupying Japanese forces. The designated historic site includes the beaches and inland areas extending between Bangi Point and Togcha Beach. Surviving remnants of the Japanese defenses on this stretch of coast include trenches and rifle pits located a short way inland, and a fortified bunker and 40mm gun emplacements at Ga'an Point. Remnants of pillboxes that had lined the beach also survive, with one at Gangi Point in relatively good condition.

The beaches and fortifications were listed on the National Register of Historic Places in 1975. Portions of them are part of the War in the Pacific National Historical Park.

== See also ==
- National Register of Historic Places listings in Guam
