= Guam Historic Register Listing =

List of local historic sites in Guam

Guam Historic Landmarks are designated by the Guam State Historic Preservation Office, also known as the State Historic Preservation Office (SHPO). Many of these landmarks are also listed on the National Register of Historic Places.

== Historic Preservation Office ==
The Guam State Historic Preservation Office (GSHPO) approves new historic districts and landmarks and ensures historic site maintain their character. Authority is granted to the GSHPO by Code § 76115, and the maintenance of the Guam Register is Code § 76506.

=== Criteria ===
To submit a landmark or district for historic designation, applicants must include a map, pictures, and a narrative demonstrating how the proposed landmark meets criteria in Section 16-38 of the Historic Preservation Ordinance.

3.2.2 A property with integrity possesses significance if the property embodies one or more of the following:

1. a. A property has cultural value if the property contributes integrally to the continuation of an on-going practice which is important in the values generally held by members and participants of a cultural tradition, or if the property is attributed special and important status in the traditions maintained by members and participants of a culture.
2. b. A property has interpretive value if the property embodies associations to important events, the lives and works of important or outstanding persons, or embodies the style or type of character associated with important patterns of events or actions in the history of Guam.
3. c. A property has research value if the property provides a context from which systematic study can provide an important contribution to knowledge of the past.

== List of landmarks ==
=== Individual landmarks ===
Site	Historic Property Name	Image	Village	Designation date	NRHP date
1212	Agana Cliffline Fortification		Agana	June 16, 1988	March 4, 1991
1145	Agana Historic District		Agana	February 8, 1985	February 8, 1985
1082	Agana Japanese Fortifications		Agana	August 21, 1979	March 4, 1991
1211	Agana Pillbox		Agana	June 16, 1988	March 4, 1991
1069	Agana Spanish Bridge		Agana	December 3, 1974	September 6, 1974
1006	Agana Spanish Dikes		Agana	September 4, 1974	November 19, 1974
1039	Cormoran Monument		Agana	July 14, 1974	
1104	Dulce Nombre de Maria Agana Cathedral Basilica		Agana	August 6, 1996	
1135	Garrido House		Agana	April 2, 1984	
1102	Guam Congress Building		Agana	August 8, 2001	February 1, 2007
1115	Guam Institute, Jose P. Lujan House		Agana	May 4, 1977	October 6, 1977
1052	Japanese Caves		Agana	August 21, 1975	
1972	Marine Drive Monument		Agana	September 27, 2004	
1141	Mesa House		Agana	April 2, 1984	February 8, 1985
1070	Plaza de Espana		Agana	January 21, 1975	May 1, 1974
1033	Shimizu House		Agana	April 2, 1984	
1134	Toves House		Agana	April 2, 1984	February 8, 1985
1132	Ungacta House		Agana	April 2, 1984 Demolished in August 2002	February 8, 1985 Delisted December 31, 2004
1185	U.S. Naval Cemetery Fortification		Agana	June 16, 1988	March 14, 1991
1068	Fort Santa Agueda		Agana Heights	January 21, 1975	August 30, 1974
1054	Agat Invasion Beach		Agat	October 15, 1974	March 4, 1975
1313	Fena Massacre Site		Agat	July 22, 1993	
1048	Hill 40		Agat	October 15, 1974	March 4, 1975
1049	Mt. Alifan Battle Site		Agat	February 20, 1975	
1072	Taelayag Spanish Bridge		Agat	December 3, 1974	October 10, 1974
1071	Taleyfac Spanish Bridge		Agat	December 3, 1974	September 10, 1974
1868	Umang Dam		Agat	November 14, 2008	February 6, 2009
1056	Asan Ridge Battle Area		Asan	April 17, 1975	July 18, 1975
1055	Asan Invasion Beach		Asan	February 20, 1975	February 14, 1979
1057	Fonte Plateau, Nimitz Hill		Asan	June 5, 1975	
2655	Fonte River Dam		Asan		February 25, 2014
1063	Last Japanese High Command Post		Asan	June 5, 1975	
1050	Matgue River Valley Battle Area		Asan	October 15, 1974	April 3, 1975
1091	Memorial Beach Park		Asan	January 21, 1975	August 7, 1974
1084	War Crimes trial Site, Nimitz Hill		Asan	August 21, 1979	
1149	Guzman Water Catchment		Barrigada	May 6, 1994	November 14, 1994
2268	Canada Water Wells		Barrigada		September 26, 2008
1217	Pago Pillbox I		Chalan Pago	June 16, 1988	March 14, 1991
1216	Pago Pillbox II		Chalan Pago	June 16, 1988	March 14, 1991
9	Falcona Beach Site		Dededo	July 3, 1974	
7	Haputo Beach Site		Dededo	June 5, 1974	
5	Hila’an		Dededo	July 24, 1974	
12	Ritidian		Dededo	August 14, 1974	
141	South Finegayan Latte Stone Park		Dededo	July 24, 1974	September 5, 1975
10	Uruno Site		Dededo	July 24, 1974	December 27, 1974
11	Uruno Beach Site		Dededo	June 5, 1974	December 27, 1974
1966	Aga Tongan Archaeological Site		Inarajan		September 26, 2008
110	Asiga Beach		Inarajan	August 14, 1974	
112	Asmaile Point		Inarajan	September 21, 1977	November 7, 1978
142	Gadao's Cave		Inarajan	September 4, 1974	November 19, 1974
93	Halaiha Point		Inarajan	August 14, 1974	
1034	Inarajan Baptist Church		Inarajan	December 3, 1974	
105	Inarajan Falls Site		Inarajan	July 24, 1974	
1107	Inarajan Fortification		Inarajan	June 16, 1988	March 14, 1991
75	Inarajan Ridge		Inarajan	August 14, 1974	December 4, 1974
1320	Inarajan Village Architectural Historical District		Inarajan	March 23, 1977	November 7, 1977
91	Malolos Site		Inarajan	October 5, 1977	April 8, 1980
92	Nomna Bay		Inarajan	July 3, 1974	December 27, 1974
107	North Inarajan Site		Inarajan	November 12, 1974	February 21, 1975
2274	Paullino Outdoor Oven		Inarajan		December 3, 2010
1021	St. Joseph's Catholic Church		Inarajan	November 12, 1974	
77	Talofofo River Valley		Inarajan	July 24, 1979	December 27, 1974
109	West Atate		Inarajan	August 14, 1974	December 4, 1974
25	Mochom/ Nisichan		Mangilao	June 5, 1974	December 4, 1974
39	South Mochom		Mangilao	July 3, 1974	
148	Taogam Complex		Mangilao	May 9, 1978	April 15, 1980
2399	Malesso Japanese Rice Mill		Merizo		November 28, 2012
1013	Merizo Bell Tower / Old Spanish Bell Tower		Merizo	February 20, 1975	May 29, 1975
1067	Merizo Conbento		Merizo	February 20, 1975	September 17, 1974
1188	Merizo Pillbox		Merizo	June 16, 1988	March 14, 1991
1123	Merlyn G. Cook School		Merizo	February 21, 1978	November 29, 1979
1223	Tinta Massacre Site		Merizo	June 18, 1991	November 26, 1991
1077	Faha Massacre Site		Merizo	June 18, 1991	August 27, 1991
1012	Atantano Shrine		Piti	June 5, 1975	November 21, 1995
1154	Kitsugawa Maru		Piti	October 28, 1986	
1040	Mabini Prisoner of War Camp		Piti	July 12, 1979	
1086	Mt. Tenjo Fortifications		Piti	September 21, 1977	March 13, 1979
1046	Piti Coastal Defense Guns		Piti	April 17, 1975	June 18, 1975
2276	Quan Outdoor Oven		Piti		December 3, 2010
145	Bona Site		Santa Rita	October 5, 1977	March 26, 1979
1043	Cable Station		Santa Rita	October 15, 1974	September 6, 1979
1088	Japanese Midget Attack Submarine		Santa Rita	September 21, 1977	February 3, 2000
1066	Orote Air Field		Santa Rita	February 20, 1975	June 18, 1975
1009	Orote Historic Complex		Santa Rita	October 23, 1979	October 23, 1979
1009	Orote Point Complex		Santa Rita	October 5, 1977	October 23, 1979
1042	Pan American Hotel		Santa Rita	October 15, 1974	
1037	S.M.S. Cormoran		Santa Rita	July 24, 1974	April 4, 1975
1041	Sumay Cemetery		Santa Rita	September 4, 1974	October 8, 1999
2366	Talisay Site		Santa Rita		November 5, 2014
1089	Tokai Maru		Santa Rita	July 14, 1988	July 14, 1988
1045	West Bona Site		Santa Rita	March 26, 1979	March 26, 1979
2275	Won Pat Outdoor Oven		Sinajana		December 3, 2010
1156	Aratama Maru		Talofofo	June 2, 1988	June 2, 1988
1109	Talofofo Bay Fortification		Talofofo	June 16, 1988	March 14, 1991
69	Asquiroga Cave		Talofofo	June 5, 1975	May 6, 1976
1985	Mahlac Pictograph Cave		Talofofo		November 12, 2014
1213	Mana Pillbox		Talofofo	June 16, 1988	March 14, 1991
1189	Matala Point Pillbox		Talofofo	March 14, 1991	June 16, 1998
68	South Talofofo Site		Talofofo	November 12, 1974	February 24, 1975
1190	Talofofo Pillbox		Talofofo	June 16, 1988	March 14, 1991
53	Talofofo Site		Talofofo	July 3, 1974	
1215	Togcha Pillbox II		Talofofo	June 16, 1988	March 4, 1991
1047	Yokoi's Cave		Talofofo	October 5, 1977	January 16, 1980
1186	Oka Fortification		Tamuning	June 16, 1988	March 14, 1991
1202	As Sombrero Pillbox I		Tumon	June 16, 1988	March 4, 1991
1203	As Sombrero Pillbox II		Tumon	June 16, 1988	March 4, 1991
1204	As Sombrero Pillbox III		Tumon	June 16, 1988	March 4, 1991
1105	Dungca's Beach Defense Gun		Tumon	October 2, 1975	December 22, 1976
2	Fafai Beach		Tumon	September 24, 1974	November 19, 1974
1195	Gongna Beach Gun Emplacement		Tumon	June 16, 1988	March 14, 1991
1199	Gongna Beach Gun Mount		Tumon	June 16, 1988	March 4, 1991
1176	Naton Headland Caves		Tumon	June 16, 1988	March 14, 1991
1177	Naton Headland Fortification I		Tumon	June 16, 1988	March 4, 1991
1178	Naton Headland Fortification II		Tumon	June 16, 1988	March 4, 1991
1200	San Vitores Beach Fortification		Tumon	June 16, 1988	March 4, 1991
1007	San Vitores Martyrdom Site		Tumon	August 14, 1974	October 31, 1975
1184	Tumon Cliffline Fortification I		Tumon	June 16, 1988	March 14, 1991
1183	Tumon Cliffline Fortification II		Tumon	June 16, 1988	March 4, 1991
1220	Tumon Cliffline Fortification III		Tumon	June 16, 1988	March 4, 1991
1208	Tumon Fortification		Tumon	June 16, 1988	March 4, 1991
1207	Tumon Pillbox III		Tumon	June 16, 1988	March 14, 1991
1201	Tumon Pillbox I		Tumon	June 16, 1988	March 4, 1991
1206	Tumon Pillbox II		Tumon	June 16, 1988	March 4, 1991
156	Ypao Beach Archaeological Site		Tumon	April 2, 1984	May 24, 1984
1205	Ypao Pillbox I		Tumon	June 16, 1988	March 14, 1991
1209	Ypao Pillbox II		Tumon	June 16, 1988	March 14, 1991
1210	Ypao Pillbox III		Tumon	June 16, 1988	March 14, 1991
126	Abong Beach		Umatac	August 14, 1974	
123	Achugao Bay		Umatac	April 17, 1975	August 19, 1975
124	Agaga Beach		Umatac	April 17, 1975	June 11, 1975
127	Cetti Bay		Umatac	September 24, 1974	November 21, 1974
140	Creto Site		Umatac	August 3, 1977	November 7, 1978
1073	Fort Nuestra Señora de la Soledad		Umatac	January 21, 1973	October 18, 1974
1001	Fort San Jose		Umatac	July 24, 1974	May 1, 1974
1074	Fort Santa Angel		Umatac	May 8, 1975	August 30, 1974
128	Fouha Bay		Umatac	September 24, 1974	November 21, 1974
1661	F. Q. Sanchez Elementary School		Umatac	April 30, 1998	June 12, 1998
130	Machadgan Point		Umatac	September 21, 1977	November 7, 1978
1011	Magellan Monument		Umatac	June 5, 1975	
134	North Cetti Bay		Umatac	June 5, 1975	
1023	San Dionicio Catholic Church		Umatac	November 12, 1974	
1024	San Dionicio Church Ruins		Umatac	November 12, 1974	August 30, 1974
1002	Sella Bay Spanish Bridge		Umatac	July 24, 1974	
1008	Sella Bay Spanish Oven		Umatac	September 24, 1974	November 8, 1974
125	Sella Bay		Umatac	September 24, 1974	November 8, 1974
131	Toguan Bay		Umatac	May 8, 1975	
133	Umatac Ridge		Umatac	June 5, 1975	
1187	Umatac Pillbox		Umatac	June 16, 1988	March 4, 1991
1662	Umatac Outdoor Library		Umatac	September 14, 1999	November 12, 1999
18	Anao Site		Yigo	May 4, 1977	May 11, 1977
1147	Cruz Water Catchment		Yigo	May 6, 1994	November 14, 1994
19	Hanum		Yigo	August 3, 1977	November 7, 1978
14	Inapsan		Yigo	July 3, 1974	December 27, 1974
1192	Jinapsan Oven		Yigo	December 27, 1974	May 4, 1989
20	Lujuna		Yigo	June 5, 1974	
1062	Mataguac Hill Command Post		Yigo	April 17, 1975	June 10, 1975
22	Pagat		Yigo	June 5, 1974	March 13, 1974
13	Pajon Point		Yigo	July 3, 1974	
16	Pati Point		Yigo	July 24, 1974	
1965	Talagi Pictograph Cave		Yigo		March 24, 2004
15	Tarague Beach District		Yigo	August 14, 1985	
1135	Torre Water Catchment		Yigo	September 20, 1990	November 14, 1994
2271	Baza Outdoor Oven		Yona		December 3, 2010
1118	Light Model Tank No. 95		Yona	August 21, 1979	December 19, 1979
155	South Pulantat		Yona	August 3, 1977	March 26, 1979
139	Ylig River		Yona	August 14, 1974	
1274	Ylig River Fortification I		Yona	June 16, 1988	March 14, 1991
1174	Ylig River Fortification II		Yona	June 16, 1988	March 14, 1991

== See also ==
- National Register of Historic Places listings in Guam
