= Geography of Guam =

Guam
Native name: Guåhan
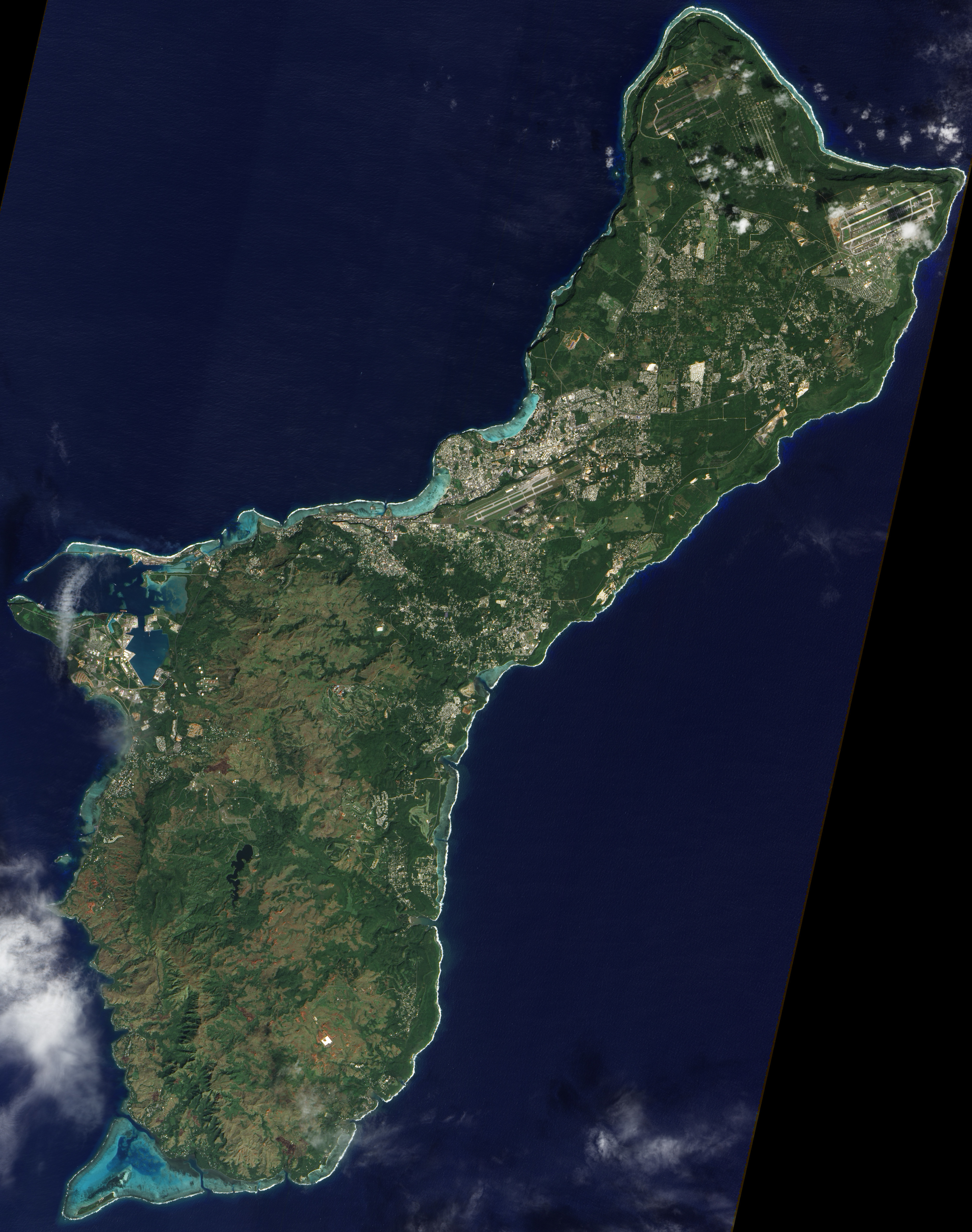
- A satellite image of Guam

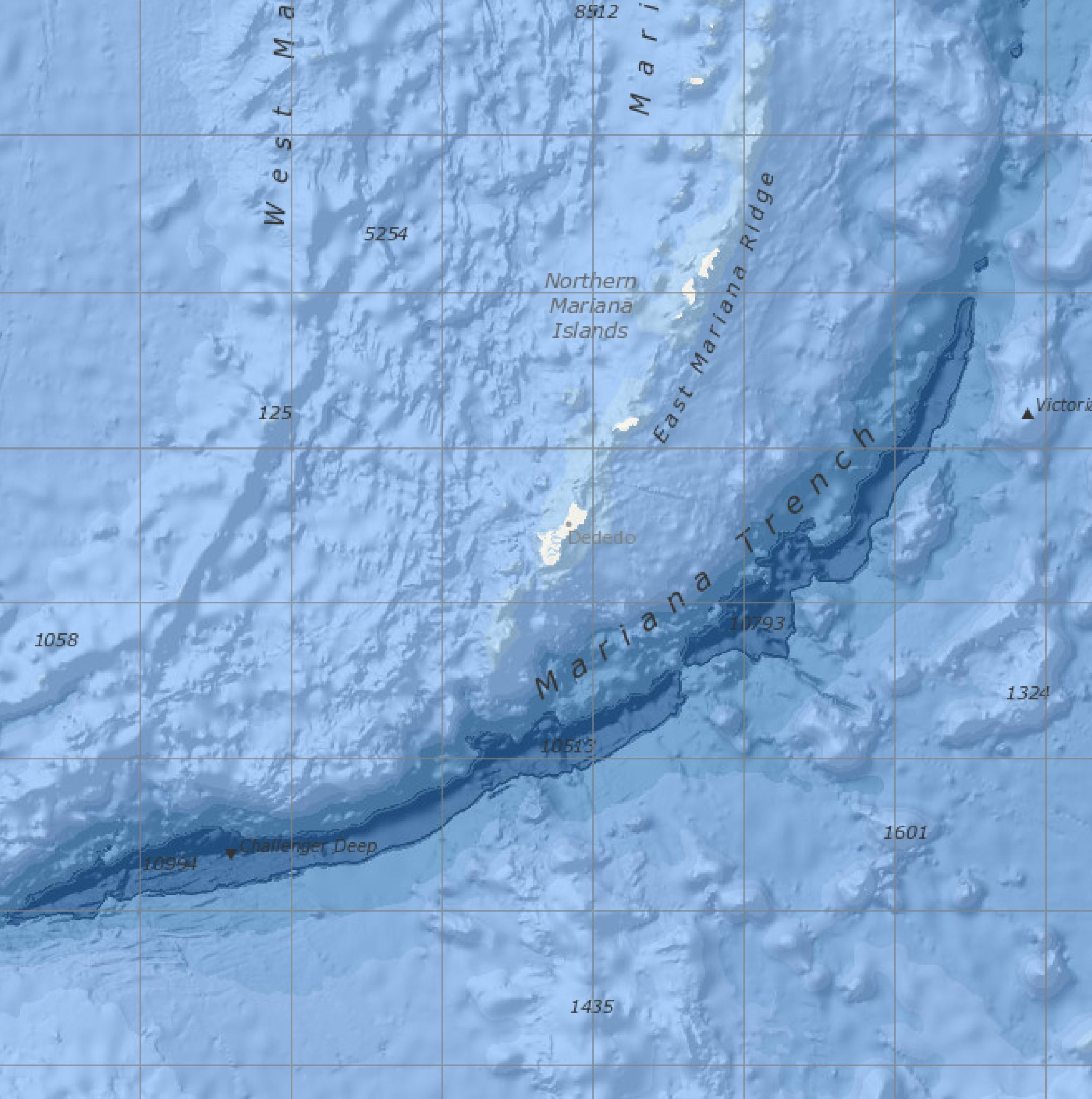
- Bathymetric map of the vicinity of Guam, including the Mariana Trench and East Mariana Ridge

- Location within Pacific Ocean Location within Earth

Geography
- Location: Pacific Ocean
- Coordinates: 13°26′31″N 144°46′35″E
- Archipelago: Mariana Islands
- Area: 544 km^{2} (210 sq mi)
- Length: 51 km (31.7 mi)
- Width: 15 km (9.3 mi)
- Coastline: 125.5 km (77.98 mi)
- Highest elevation: 406 m (1332 ft)
- Highest point: Mount Lamlam

Administration
- United States
- Territory: Guam
- Largest settlement: Dededo (pop. 46,000)

Demographics
- Population: 167,358 (July 2017 est.)
- Pop. density: 320.44/km^{2} (829.94/sq mi)
- Ethnic groups: Native Chamorros (57%), Filipino (25.5%), White (10%), Chinese, Japanese and Korean ancestry

Guam is a U.S. territory in the western Pacific Ocean, at the boundary of the Philippine Sea. It is the southernmost and largest member of the Mariana Islands archipelago, which is itself the northernmost group of islands in Micronesia. The closest political entity is the Commonwealth of the Northern Mariana Islands (CNMI), another U.S. territory. Guam shares maritime boundaries with CNMI to the north and the Federated States of Micronesia to the south. It is located approximately one quarter of the way from the Philippines to Hawaii. Its location and size make it strategically important. It is the only island with both a protected harbor and land for multiple airports between Asia and Hawaii, on an east–west axis, and between Papua New Guinea and Japan, on a north–south axis.

The island is a result of the volcanic activity created by subduction of the Pacific Plate under the Philippine Sea Plate at the nearby Mariana Trench, which runs from the east of Guam to the southwest. Volcanic eruptions established the base of the island in the Eocene, roughly 56 to 33.9 million years ago (mya). The north of Guam is a result of this base being covered with layers of coral reef, turning into limestone, and then being thrust by tectonic activity to create a plateau. The rugged south of the island is a result of more recent volcanic activity. Cocos Island off the southern tip of Guam is the largest of the many small islets along the coastline.

Politically, Guam is divided into 19 villages. The majority of the population lives on the coralline limestone plateaus of the north, with political and economic activity centered in the central and northern regions. The rugged geography of the south largely limits settlement to rural coastal areas. The western coast is leeward of the trade winds and is the location of Apra Harbor, the capitol Hagåtña, and the tourist center of Tumon. The U.S. Defense Department owns about 29% of the island, under the management of Joint Region Marianas.

== Geology ==
The Mariana Islands lie atop the largely submerged East Mariana Ridge, a part of the Izu–Bonin–Mariana (IBM) Arc. The IBM Arc is a tectonic plate convergent boundary where the west Pacific Plate subducts the Philippine Sea Plate. Guam is actually located on the Mariana Plate, a micro plate between the two. The subduction area is marked by the Mariana Trench, the deepest gash in the earth's surface, which includes three deep spots to the south of Guam. From east to west, these are: Nero Deep, which was the deepest known spot in the ocean from 1899 to 1927 at 9,660 m (31,690 ft); Sirena Deep, the third deepest measured point at 10,714 m (35,151 ft); and Challenger Deep, the deepest point at 10,902 to 10,929 m (35,768 to 35,856 ft).

There have been three major eruptions on Guam. the first, the Facpi formation, in the mid Eocene, laid the base of the island and is still the topmost formation along the southwestern coast. The second eruption created the Alutom formation that is still the topmost strata in the middle of the island. The Mount Alifan-Mount Lamlam ridge is the remnant of the Alutom formation caldera.

The last volcanic layer, called the Umatac formation, was formed by the third and final eruption, which surrounded this ridge in the south of Guam. Meanwhile, volcanic activity alternately submerged areas of the island, which hosted coral reefs, and then lifted those reefs, which became limestone. The island may be divided into four general geophysical regions: the uplifted and relatively flat coralline limestone plateau in the north that provides most of the drinking water; the low-rising hills of the Alutom Formation in the center; the mountains of the Umatac formation in the south; and the coastal lowlands ringing most of the island. Much of the coast is protected by a fringing reef.

Soils are mostly silty clay or clay and may be gray, black, brown or reddish brown; acidity and depth vary. There are four National Natural Landmarks in Guam chosen as exemplars of the island's geology: Facpi Point, Fouha Point, Mount Lamlam, and Two Lovers Point.

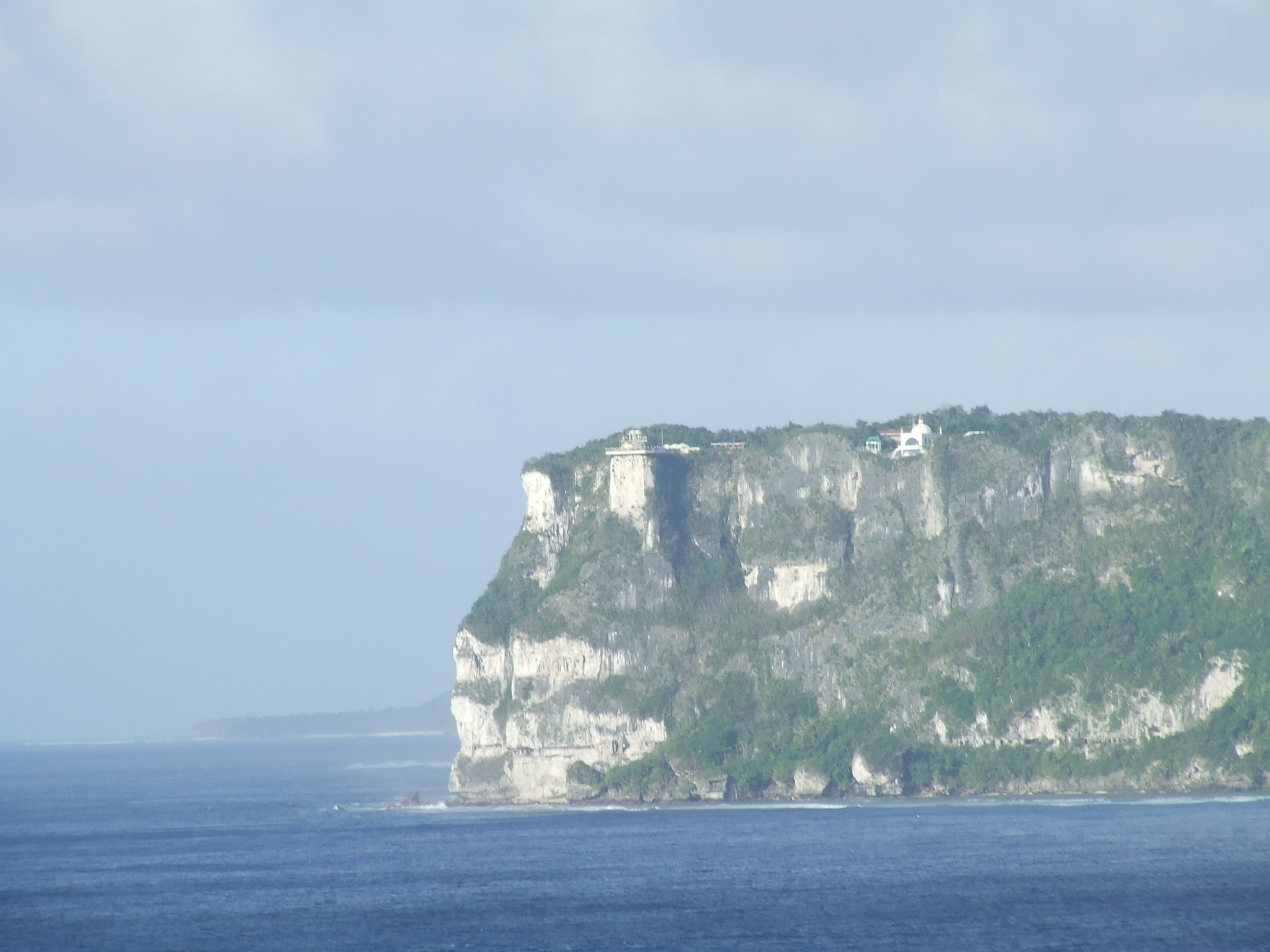
Two Lovers Point, a National Natural Landmark, is a sea cliff of coralline limestone in northern Guam

=== Earthquakes ===
Guam occasionally experiences earthquakes; most with epicenters near Guam have had magnitudes ranging from 5.0 to 8.7. Unlike Anatahan in the Northern Mariana Islands, Guam is not volcanically active, though vog (volcanic smog) from Anatahan affects it due to proximity.

== Strategic position ==
Guam is about 1,500 miles (2,400 km) from both Tokyo in the north and Manila in the west, and about 3,800 miles (6,100 km) from Honolulu in the east. Guam's size and possession of a natural safe anchorage at Apra Harbor, uniquely among its neighbors, have driven much of its history.

Guam was a minor but integral part of the Spanish Manila galleon trade. Located on the east-to-west trade winds, galleons from Mexico would briefly reprovision on Guam before continuing on to Manila. The westerlies are well away from Guam so it was not a stop on the return trip. During the height of Pacific whaling, Apra Harbor was a major stop for whalers.

After the American capture of Guam in 1898, the Commercial Pacific Cable Company laid submarine communications cable for telegraph through Guam Cable Station, linking the United States to Asia for the first time. Guam continues to be a major submarine cable hub in the western Pacific. In 1935, Pan American Airways made Sumay, Guam, a base for its China Clipper, the first trans-Pacific air cargo service, flying from San Francisco to Manila, arrived at Sumay on November 27, 1935, and the first passenger service flight on October 21, 1936.

The Japanese capture of Guam in 1941 and subsequent American liberation in 1944 were driven by a recognition of Guam's strategic location in a Pacific War. Military facilities on Guam, including Naval Base Guam and Andersen Air Force Base, are considered critical forward deployment bases in the Asia-Pacific. Guam was a support center for the Korean War (1949–1953) and became even more important during the Vietnam War, when the bombing campaigns Operation Arc Light (1965–1973) and Operation Linebacker II (1972) were flown out of Andersen Air Force Base. Guam was similarly the site of Operation New Life, the processing of Vietnamese refugees after the Fall of Saigon in 1975.

Guam is a linchpin of the "Second Island Chain" in the Island Chain Strategy first described by the U.S. during the Korean War, but which has become an increasing focus of Chinese foreign policy. In 2016, China deployed the DF-26, their first intermediate-range ballistic missile with the range to hit Guam. Chinese media wonks and military experts dubbed it the "Guam Killer."

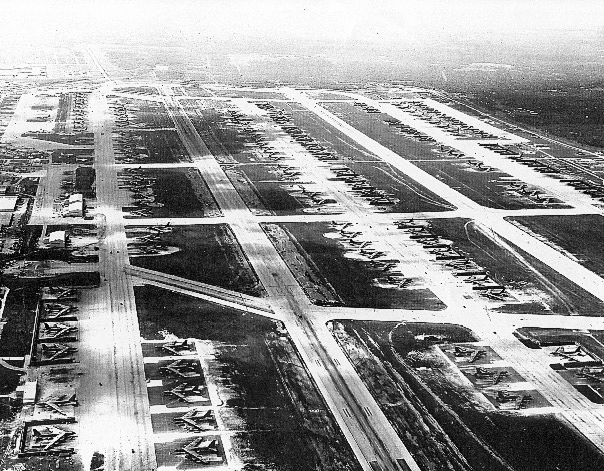
About 150 B-52 bombers at Andersen Air Force Base during the 1972 bombings of North Vietnam.

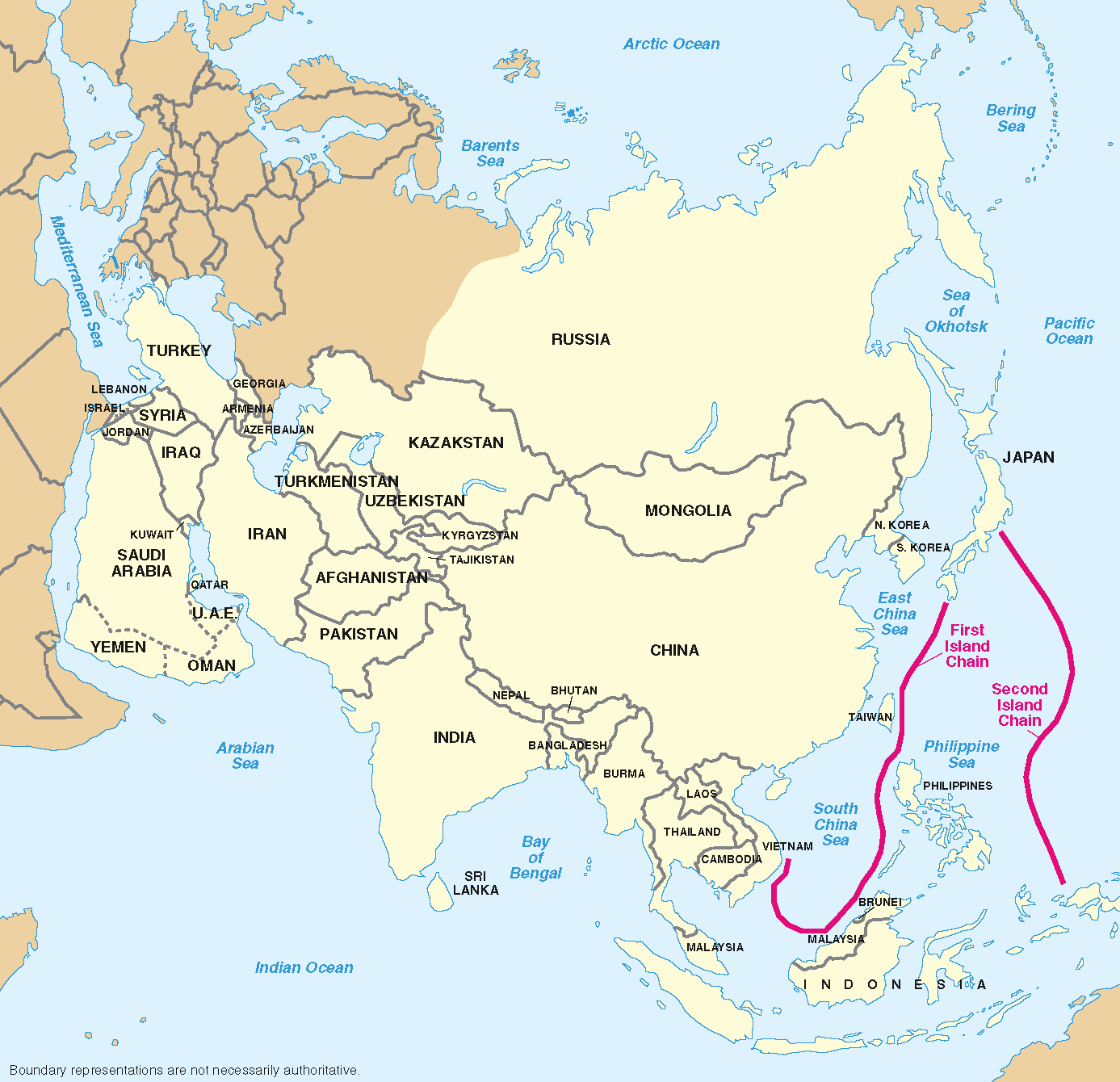
The first and second island chains.

== Settlement patterns ==
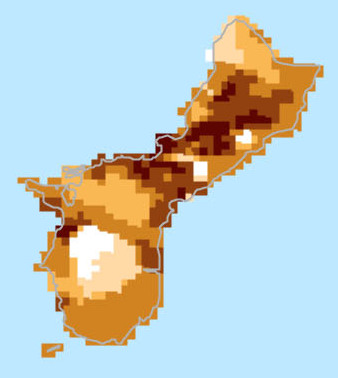
A population density map of Guam, 2000

A 1668 description reported that there were approximately 180 Chamoru villages on Guam with a total island population between 35,000 and 50,000. The Spanish strategy of villagization, called reducción, which began in the Spanish-Chamorro Wars, transferred the population to seven towns. These relocated people were forced to travel to work on distant farms and ranches, creating the lanchu system of farmsteading, which was to become a traditional part of Chamoru society well into the twentieth century.

A map from the early 1700s shows nearly 40 villages on Guam, mostly along the coastlines. The Spanish eventually emptied all of the northern and central villages of Guam, except for Hagåtña. The population of Guam and the entire Northern Marianas, except for Rota, was moved to Hagåtña, and five southern villages: Agat, Inarajan, Merizo, Pago (which no longer exists), and Umatac. Meanwhile, outbreaks of infectious disease inflicted a terrible toll, which was accelerated by concentrating the population. The Chamoru population in 1689 was estimated at 10,000, a third to fifth of the number just 20 years previously.

The population changed little over the next two centuries. The population in 1901, after the American capture of Guam, was 9,676, with the majority located in Hagåtña and Sumay on Apra Harbor. The population was 18,509 in 1930. The American Naval government build roads and schools in outlying areas in order to urge the population to spend time on their ranch lands and produce more agricultural products. There were eight municipalities approved by the Naval governor in the 1920s, Hagåtña, Agat, Asan, Inarajan, Merizo, Piti, Sumay and Yona. This increased to 15 in 1939.

The devastation from the U.S. retaking of Guam in 1944 and subsequent military build-up of installations at the end of the Pacific War transformed the island's settlements. Two municipalities that disappeared entirely after the land became military bases were Machanao in the north and Sumay on Apra Harbor, which are now part of Naval Base Guam. The military government prohibited resettlement and rebuilding of Hagåtña, which held almost half of the pre-war population. The former residents of Hagåtña dispersed, mainly to their lanchus (ranches).

Once most of the wartime bases were built, northern Guam experienced sustained housing construction. The original location of Dededo was bulldozed by the Americans to create Harmon Air Force Base. When the new location was devastated by Typhoon Karen in 1962 and Typhoon Olive in 1963, the resulting federal aid sparked a construction boom that then resulted in the first large housing subdivisions.

The neighboring municipality of Yigo on the northeast of the island has experienced dramatic population growth. In 1940, there were about 40 families living in the area. By the beginning of the 21st century, it was Guam's second most populous village after Dededo.

== Climate ==
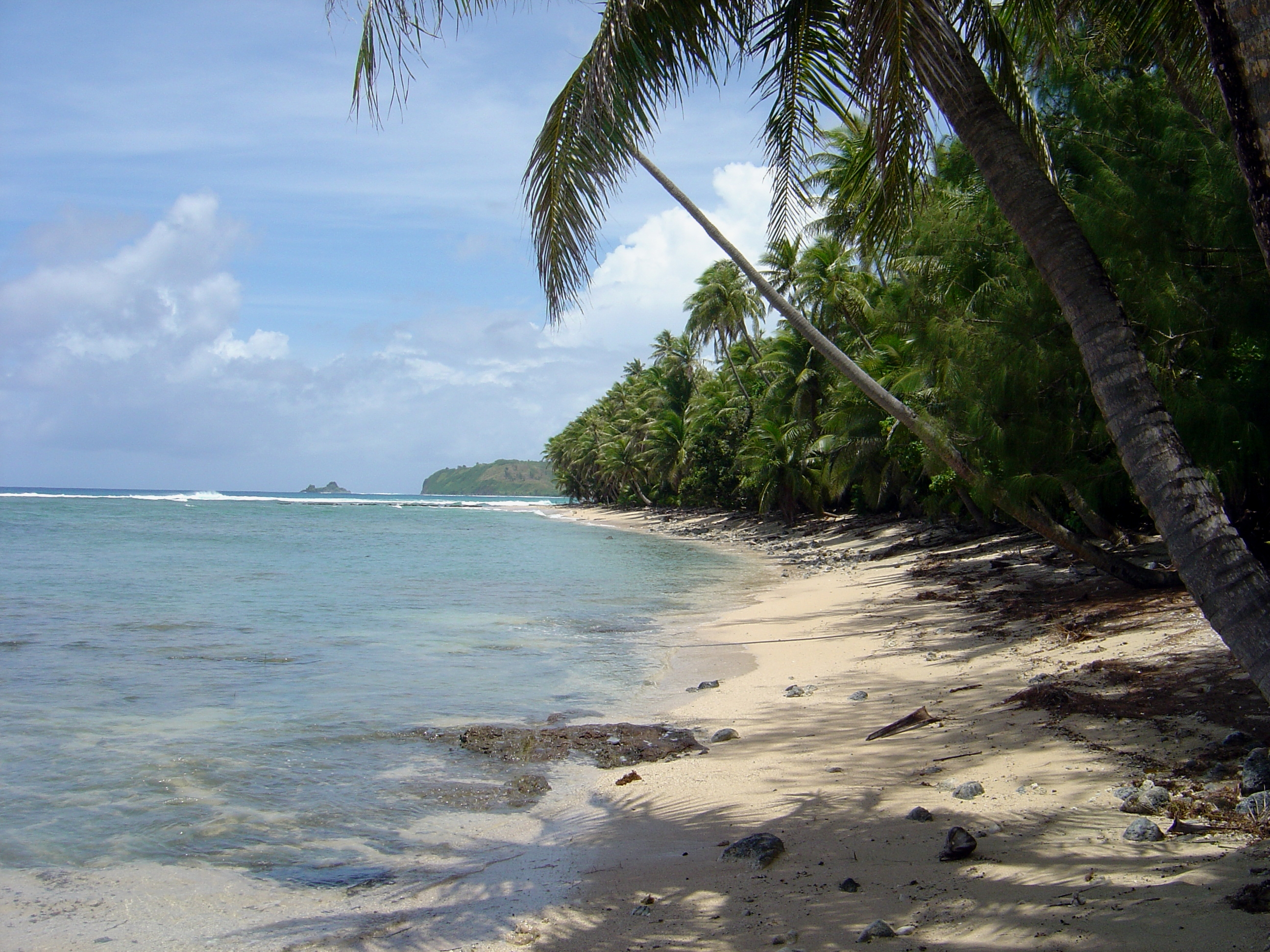
A jungle beach coastline on Guam

Guam has a tropical marine climate that is generally warm and humid, but moderated by northeast trade winds. The dry season is from January to June. The wet season is from July to December. There is little temperature variation. There are frequent squalls during the wet season. Typhoons are relatively rare but are most common during the wet season and are potentially very destructive.

Typhoon Pongsona in 2002 had wind gusts up to 290 km/h (183 mph 1-min) over Guam and caused widespread devastation, but no direct deaths because of strict building standards. Pongsona was the most damaging typhoon on Guam since Typhoon Paka in 1997.

== Environment ==
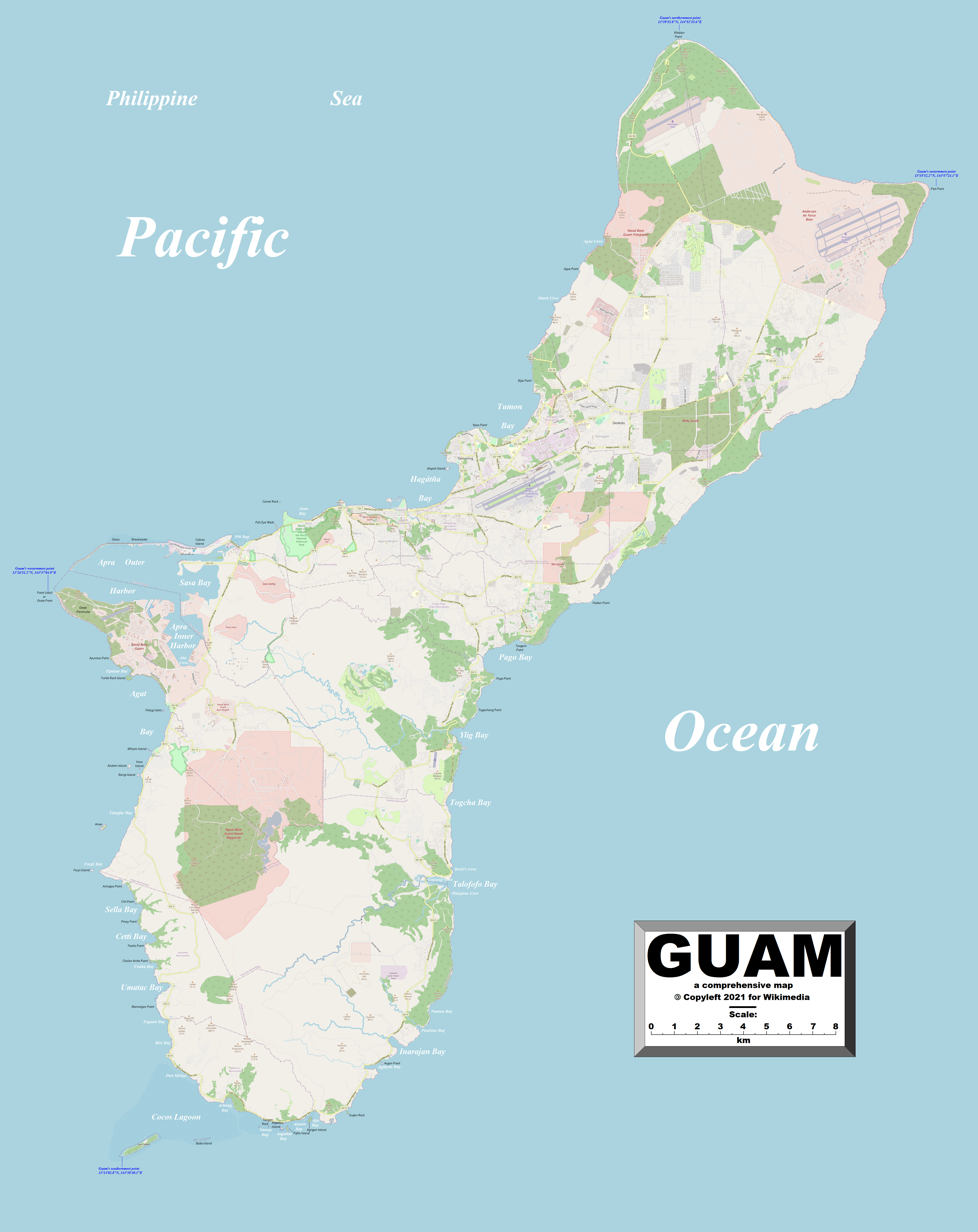
An enlargeable, detailed map of Guam

The rapid proliferation of the brown tree snake (Boiga irregularis), an exotic species, caused the local extinction of the native bird population, such as the Guam rail and Guam kingfisher. The island also supports feral populations of introduced Philippine deer (Rusa marianna), pigs (Sus scrofa), and carabao (Bubalus bubalis carabanesis).

Extraction of natural resources for economic gain is based around the sea. This includes commercial fishing, mostly servicing and unloading of longline fleets and commercial vessels. There is recreational fishing of Indo-Pacific blue marlin (Makaira mazara), wahoo (Acanthocybium solandri), mahi-mahi (Coryphaena hippurus), yellowfin tuna (Thunnus albacares), and deepwater reef fish. Tourism from Japan in particular, but increasingly from China and South Korea, largely derives from an attractive tropical climate and amenities.

A 2012 estimate was that 16.67% of the land area was being used for permanent crops, while only 1.85% was considered arable land suitable for plowing, planting, and reaping. 2 km^{2} was irrigated.

== Extreme points ==
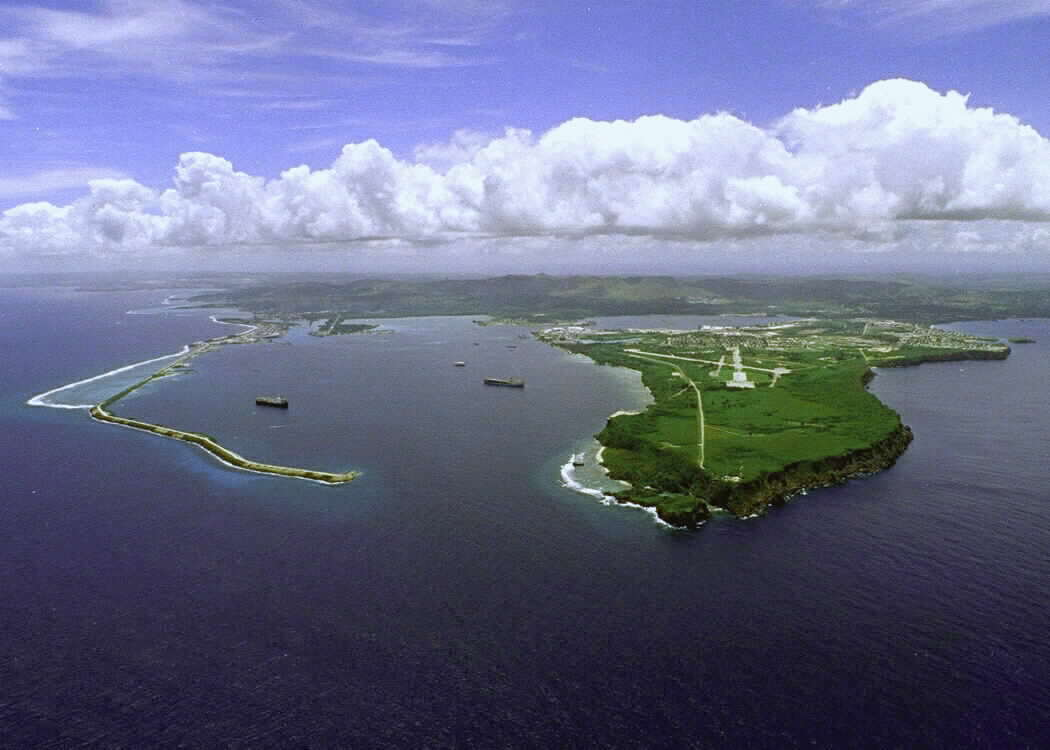
The entrance to Apra Harbor, with Point Udall, the westernmost point, on the right

The three highest points on Guam are Mount Lamlam at 406 meters (1,332 ft), Mount Jumullong Manglo at 391 meters (1,283 ft), and Mount Bolanos, 368 meters (1,207 ft). Mount Lamlam is sometimes claimed to be the world's highest mountain at 37,820 feet (11,530 m), measured from a base in Challenger Deep 304 km (189 mi) away. Even if measured from Sirena Deep, 145 kilometers (90 mi) away, Mount Lamlam is taller than Mauna Kea, which is typically cited as the tallest mountain including subsurface rise from the ocean floor at 10,203 m (33,474 ft).

The extreme north, east, south, and west locations on mainland Guam are Ritidian Point, Pati Point, Aga Point, and Point Udall, respectively. However, Cocos Island, located off the southern coast of Guam's mainland is the ultimate southernmost point of the territory. Point Udall, previously named Orote Point, is also the westernpoint point of the U.S., as measured from the geographic center of the United States.
