= Imong River =

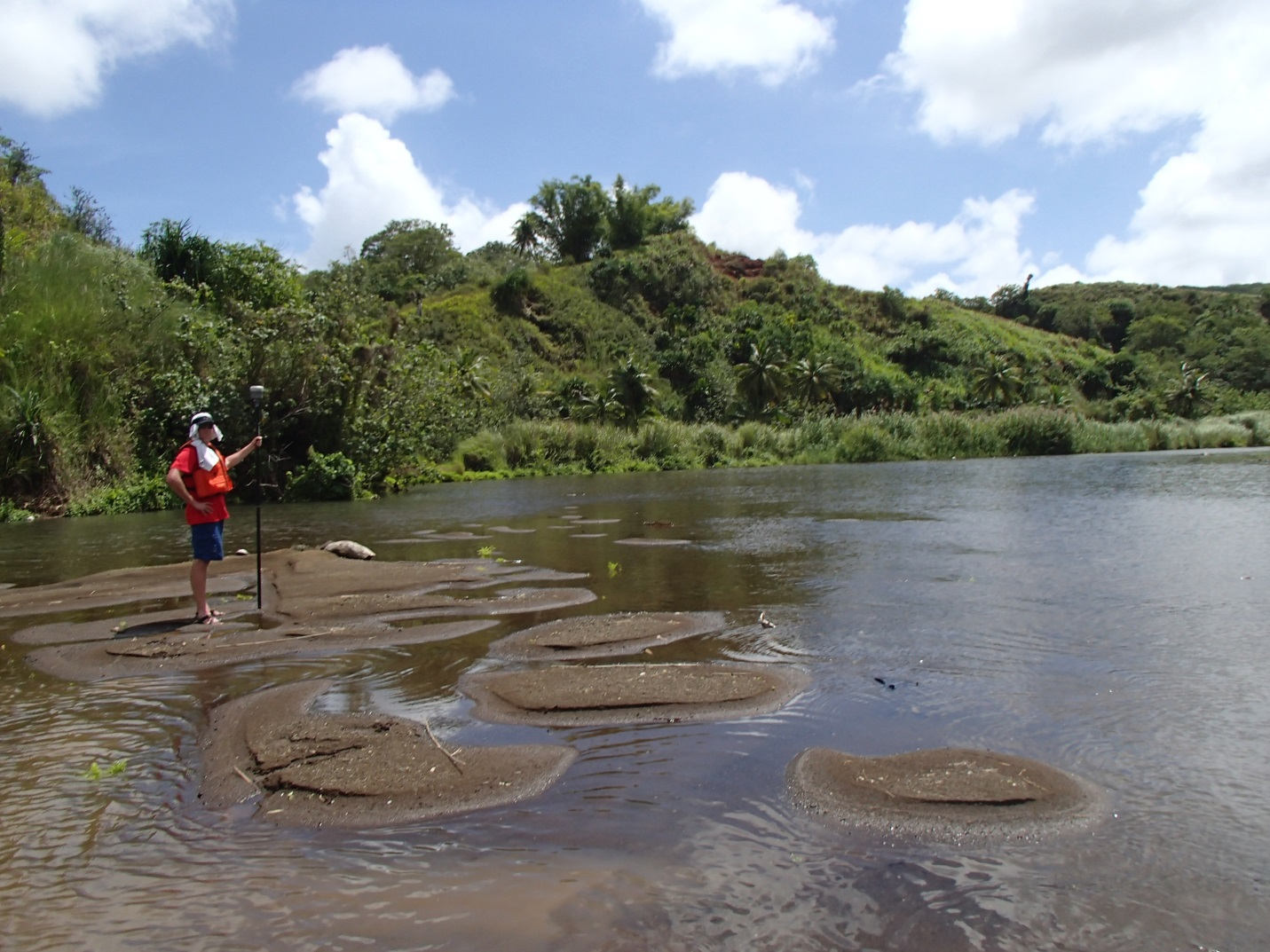
- Imong River sedimentation at Fena Lake Reservoir

Location
- Country: Guam

Physical characteristics
- Mouth
  - coordinates: 13.3386111°N 144.6975000°E

The Imong River is a short river in United States territory of Guam. Its source on the ridgeline between Mount Jumullong Manglo and Mount Bolanos flows northeast within the boundaries of both Talofofo and the Navy's Ordnance Annex into Fena Lake Reservoir.

== See also ==
- List of rivers of Guam
