= List of National Natural Landmarks in Guam =

From List of National Natural Landmarks, these are the National Natural Landmarks in Guam. There are 4 in total. All sites are on lands owned by the territorial government.

	Name	Image	Date	Location	County	Description
1	Facpi Point		1972	13°20′29.61″N 144°37′57.57″E	Guam	Contains pillow lava, intersecting dikes, and a massive sea stack of black coralline limestone.
2	Fouha Point		1972	13°18′25.16″N 144°39′18.91″E	Guam	Contains exposures of volcanic rock with a nearby intertidal platform of two levels of coralline limestone.
3	Mount Lamlam		1972	13°20′23.13″N 144°39′56.35″E	Guam	A remnant of a great caldera.
4	Two Lovers Point (Puntan Dos Amåntes)		1972	13°32′5.97″N 144°48′8.83″E	Guam	A 370-foot-high (110 m) cliff exposure of massive limestone.
