= Fena Massacre =

Historic event in Guam

- Part of World War II
- Date: July 19, 1944
- Target: Chamorro people
- Attack type: Massacre; Mass rape
- Deaths: 30+
- Injuries: 17
- Perpetrator: Imperial Japanese Army

The Fena Massacre, also known as the Fena Cave Massacre, was an event where more than 30 Chamorro people were killed by Japanese soldiers during World War II. Dozens of Chamorro women were also raped. The site is located at present-day Naval Base Guam’s Ordnance Annex in Sånta Rita-Sumai.

== History ==
Residents from Agat and Sumay were rounded up by Japanese forces on July 19, 1944, two days before the island's liberation. About 50 young men and women were held under strict working conditions to perform forced labor. The Chamorros transferred ammunition from Apaka Point to the Talayfac areas south of Agat. Parents of the victims were sent to a concentration camp in Mannengon Valley.

When the American forces began bombardment and shelling, the Chamorros fled to area of present-day Fena Lake and were herded by the Japanese soldiers into the Atdutgan caves. These caves along the cliff of San Ramon Hill were constructed in anticipation of the American liberation.

Lured to the cave with promises of food, the victims were intoxicated by sake and beer. More than 30 Chamorro victims were killed by grenades, machine guns, bayonets, and sharpened bamboo lances in the caves. Dozens of Chamorro women were also repeatedly raped in the caves.

Survivors hid under dead bodies.

=== List of victims ===
Guam's Wall of Strength: Names Never Forgotten is part of the War Survivors Memorial Exhibit in the lobby of the Guam Congress Building in Hagåtna.

This list was compiled by the Fena Memorial Committee.

Victims
Name
Balbino G. Aguigui
Jesus Aguon
Joseph Babauta
Juan B. Babauta
Vicente Munoz Borja
Gaily Cruz Camacho
Evelyn T. Carbullido
Concepcion R. Castro
Dolores Rabago Castro
Maria Rabago Castro
Antonio B Charfauros
Dolores J Cruz
Jose T Cruz
Maria J Cruz
Vicente T Cruz
Antonio Cruz Elliot
Dolores C Fejeran
Enrique C Fejeran
Joe Herrera
Caridad T Lizama
Gregorio T Lizama
Juan Ulloa Mendiola
Rosalia Pinaula Mesa
Ana Terlaje Nededog
Jaun T Nededog
Ana P Perez
Ana L.G. Quitano
Nicolas Sablan
Raleigh Carbullido Sablan
Rosita Carbullido Sablan
Frank Toves
Johnny Toves

=== List of survivors ===
This list was compiled by the Fena Memorial Committee. In 2018, according to the Agat Mayor's Office, there were 17 survivors still living.

Survivors
Name
Elias San Nicolas Aguigui
Maria (Chong) San Nicolas Alerta
Jesus C Babauta
Rosa C Babauta
Vicente Torres Babauta
Joaquin Barcinas
Maria S Babauta
Gregorio Mendiola Babauta
Juan Mendiola Babauta
Francisco Borja
Francisco G Camacho
Juan Guerrero Camacho
Ana Muna Salas Castaneda
Jose Rabago Castro
Santiago Rabago Castro
Maria B Chaco
Francisco Muna Charfauros
Francisco Perez Concepcion
Ignacio Mendiola Concepcion
Maria Mendiola Cruz Cordova
Antonio Reyes Cruz
Joaquin Mendiola Cruz
Joaquin Ofricido Cruz
Jose Ofricido Cruz
Juan Reyes Cruz
Pedro Ofricido Cruz
Joaquin De Jesus
Antonio Reyes Dela Cruz
Jesus Mata Espinosa
Catalina C Fernandez
Joseph C Garrido
Rosa Taitague Garrido
Jesus Concepcion Guzman
Maria Herrera
Vicente Q Herrera
Juan Quitugua Lizama
Josefa San Nicolas Manguba
Gregorio Sablan Munoz
Roque Nededog Nededog
Francisco Sablan Pangelinan
John Pinaula
Joseph Pinaula
William Pinaula
Jesus G Quidachay
Enrique Chaco Reyes
Gonzalo Chaco Reyes
Joseph C Reyes
Juan Tajito (Severa) Reyes
Pedro L.G. Roberto
Francisco "Nabing" Manibu-san Sablan
Jose S Sablan
Juan S Sablan
Jesus Muna San Nicolas
Jose Chaco San Nicolas
Agnes Nededog Sucaldito
Antonio Muna Salas
Jose B Santos
Alfonsina Sablan Schmidt-Yates
Jose Taitano
Balbino Muna Terlaje
Jose Q Topasna
Arthur Carbullido Toves
Joseph Carbullido Toves
Juan Ulloa
Agustin Nededog Unsiog

== Memorial ==
The Guam War Reparations Committee researched the Fena massacre. The caves have collapsed in some areas. Fallen boulders and vines obstruct access to the caves.

On March 7, 1990, Governor Joseph F. Ada signed Public Law No. 20-157 to authorize the erection of a memorial. The Fena Massacre site was added to the Guam Historic Register on July 22, 1993.

A memorial service was established in 1998. Participants walk to the foothills of Fena Cave, lay wreaths on a memorial at the Old Agat Cemetery, light candles, read the names of the deceased, and perform a CHamoru blessing. The U.S. Navy opens up the site on the memorial day for participants to attend.

== See also ==
- Liberation Day (Guam)
