= Talofofo River =

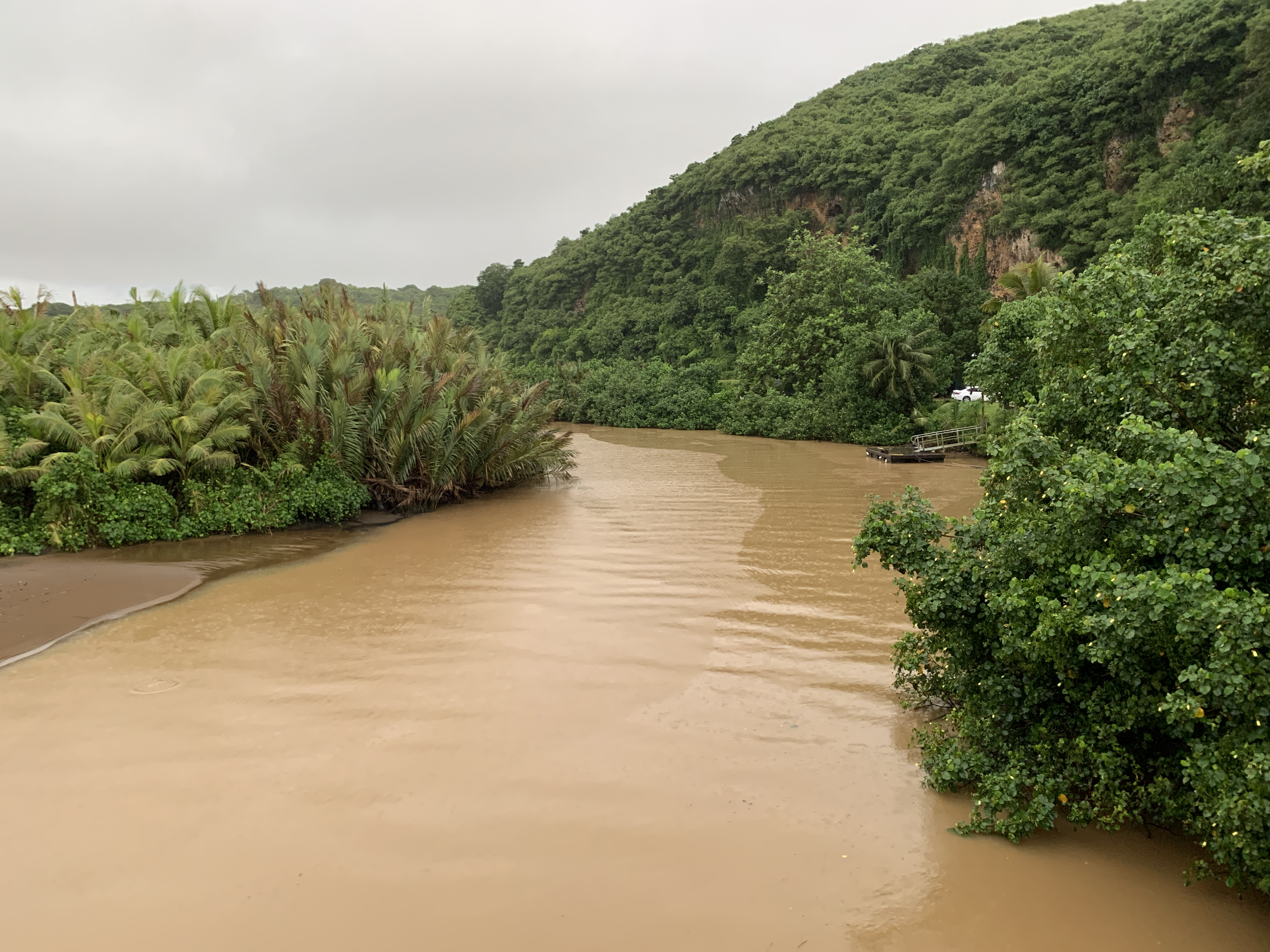
- Talofofo River near the mouth

- Location within Guam

Physical characteristics
- Mouth
  - coordinates: 13.3372222°N 144.7597222°E

The Talofofo River is one of the longest rivers on the Pacific Ocean island of Guam. Rising on the eastern slopes of Mount Lamlam in the island's south-west, it traverses the island in a north-eastward direction, flowing into the sea at Talofofo Bay.

Major features of the river's course include Fena Lake, Guam's largest lake, and the Talofofo Falls. The river has one major tributary, the Ligum River, which joins it close to its mouth.
