= Mount Llicho =

Mountain in Guam

- Location within Guam

Highest point
- Elevation: 246.9 m (810 ft)
- Coordinates: 13°17′37″N 144°41′02″E

Geography
- Location: Guam, Micronesia, U.S. territory
- Topo map: USGS Agat

Geology
- Mountain type: Mountain

Mount Llicho is a mountain on island of the United States territory of Guam. Llicho's closest populated area is Umatac.

It is 246.9 meters (810 ft) above sea level.
