= Cetti Bay =

- U.S. National Register of Historic Places
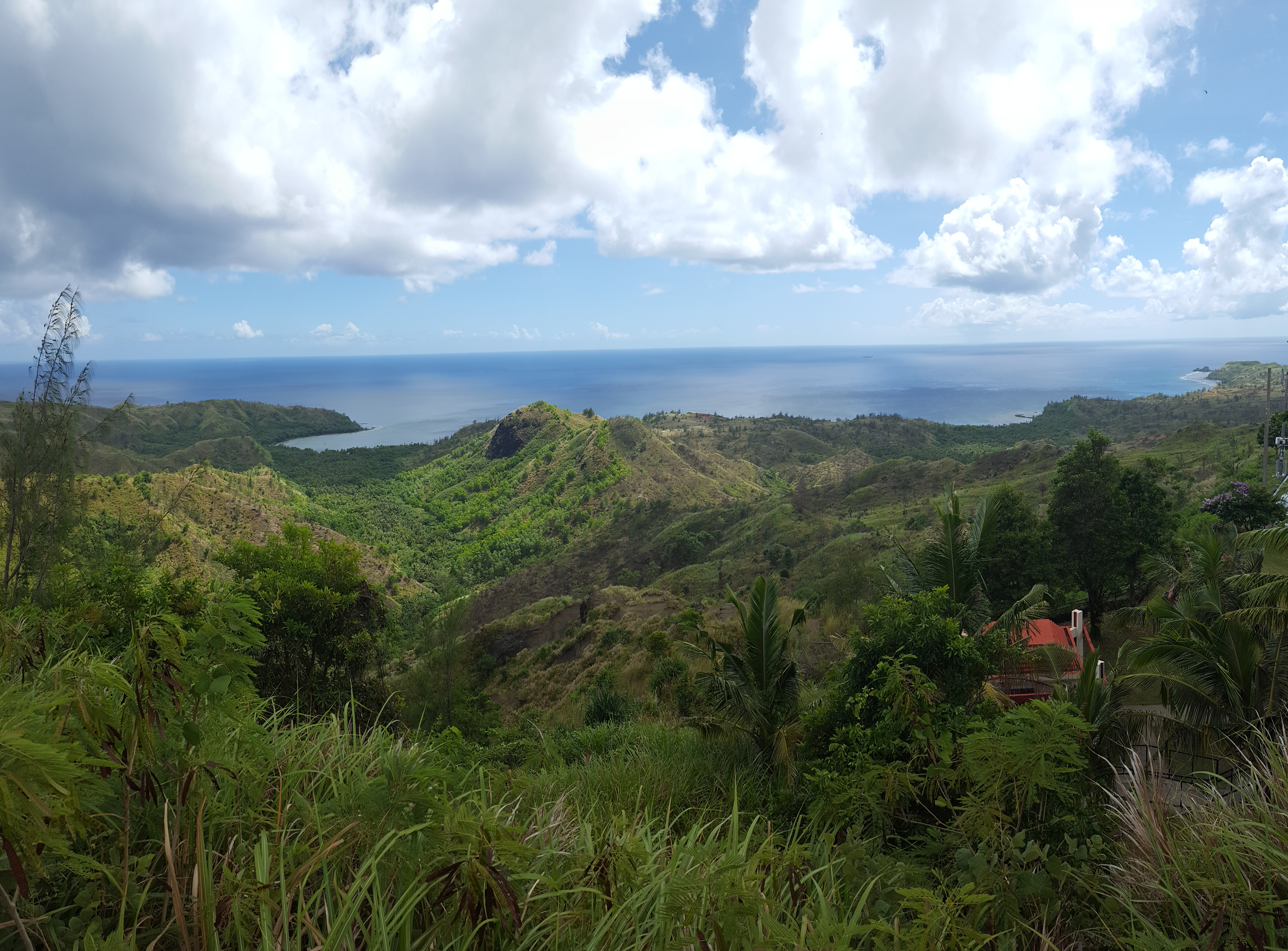
- The bay as seen from the hills above

- Location within Guam
- Location: 1.1 miles (1.8 km) north-northwest of Umatac
- Nearest city: Umatac, Guam
- Coordinates: 13°18′52″N 144°39′16″E
- Area: 10 acres (4.0 ha)
- NRHP reference No.: 74002036
- Added to NRHP: November 21, 1974

Cetti Bay is an oceanic bay and historic site near Umatac, Guam, that is listed on the National Register of Historic Places.

The name refers to both that of the bay on the Pacific Ocean and to the historic site located around and inland from the bay. The dimensions of the site are 800 yards (730 m) curving along the entire beach and 50 yards (46 m) inland. Also known as the town of Jati and as Ati, it historically involved a manufacturing facility. The site was listed on the National Register of Historic Places in 1974 as an archeological site.

Cetti, however, is one of the hardest sites to reach by foot. It is the second bay that lies north of Humåtak/Umatac village, and is probably easiest to get to by boat when the waters are calm
