= Two Lovers Point =

Cape and cliff in Tamuning, Guam

Two Lovers Point Puntan Dos Amåntes
- Cape
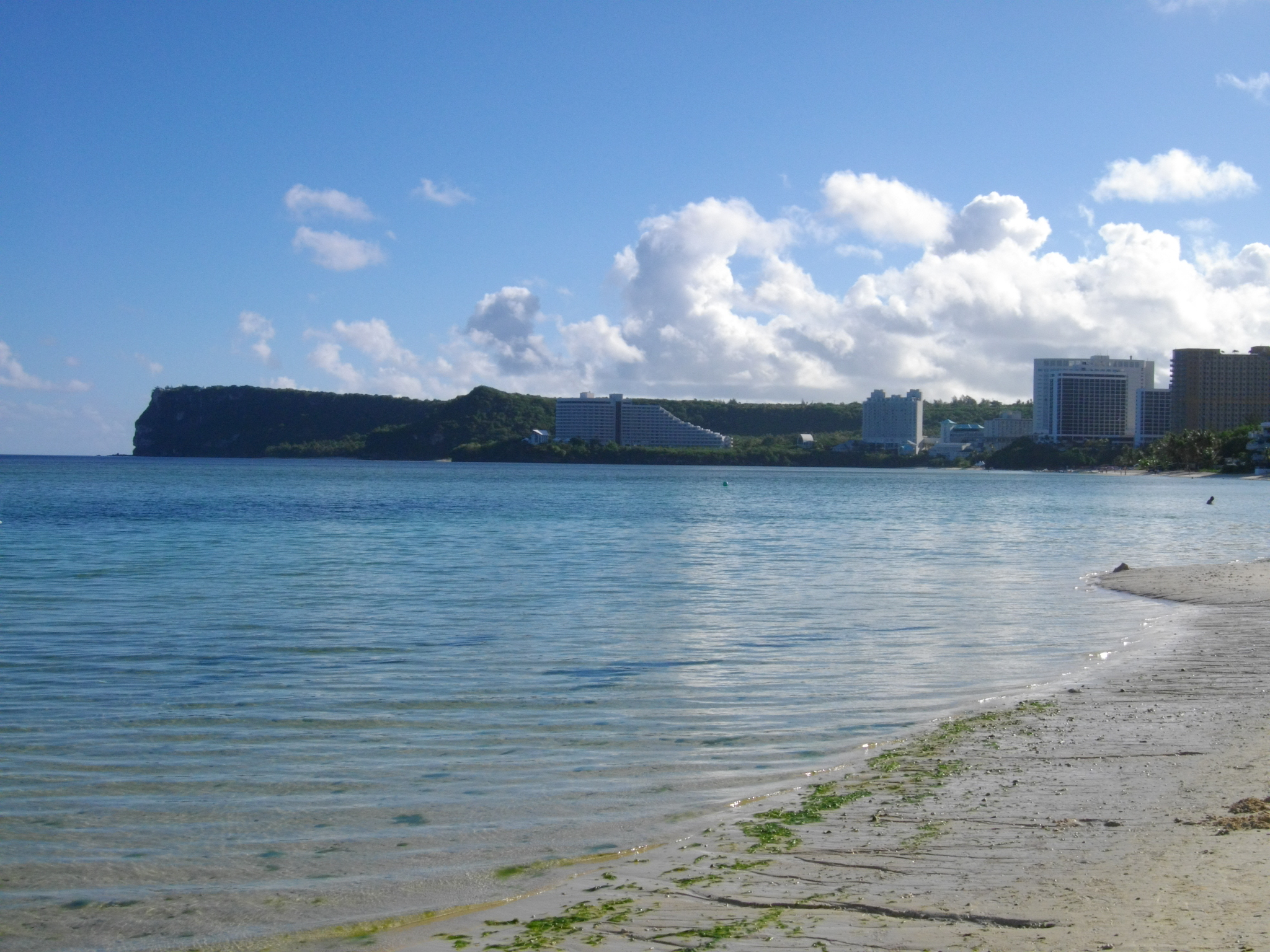
- The sihouette of Two Lovers Point dominates the view north from the Tumon tourist center

- Location within Guam
- Coordinates: 13°32′5.97″N 144°48′8.83″E
- Surface elevation: 110 m (370 ft)
- Website: puntandosamantes.com

U.S. National Natural Landmark
- Designated: 1972

Two Lovers Point (Chamorro: Puntan Dos Amåntes) is a prominent cape and seaside cliff in Tamuning, Guam, that overlooks northern Tumon Bay and the Philippine Sea. One of four National Natural Landmarks on Guam, it is closely associated with the folktale of two doomed lovers and is a major tourist attraction.

The Point is part of the limestone plateau that forms the northern part of Guam. The cliff height at the point is approximately 370 feet (113 m).

== Folktale ==
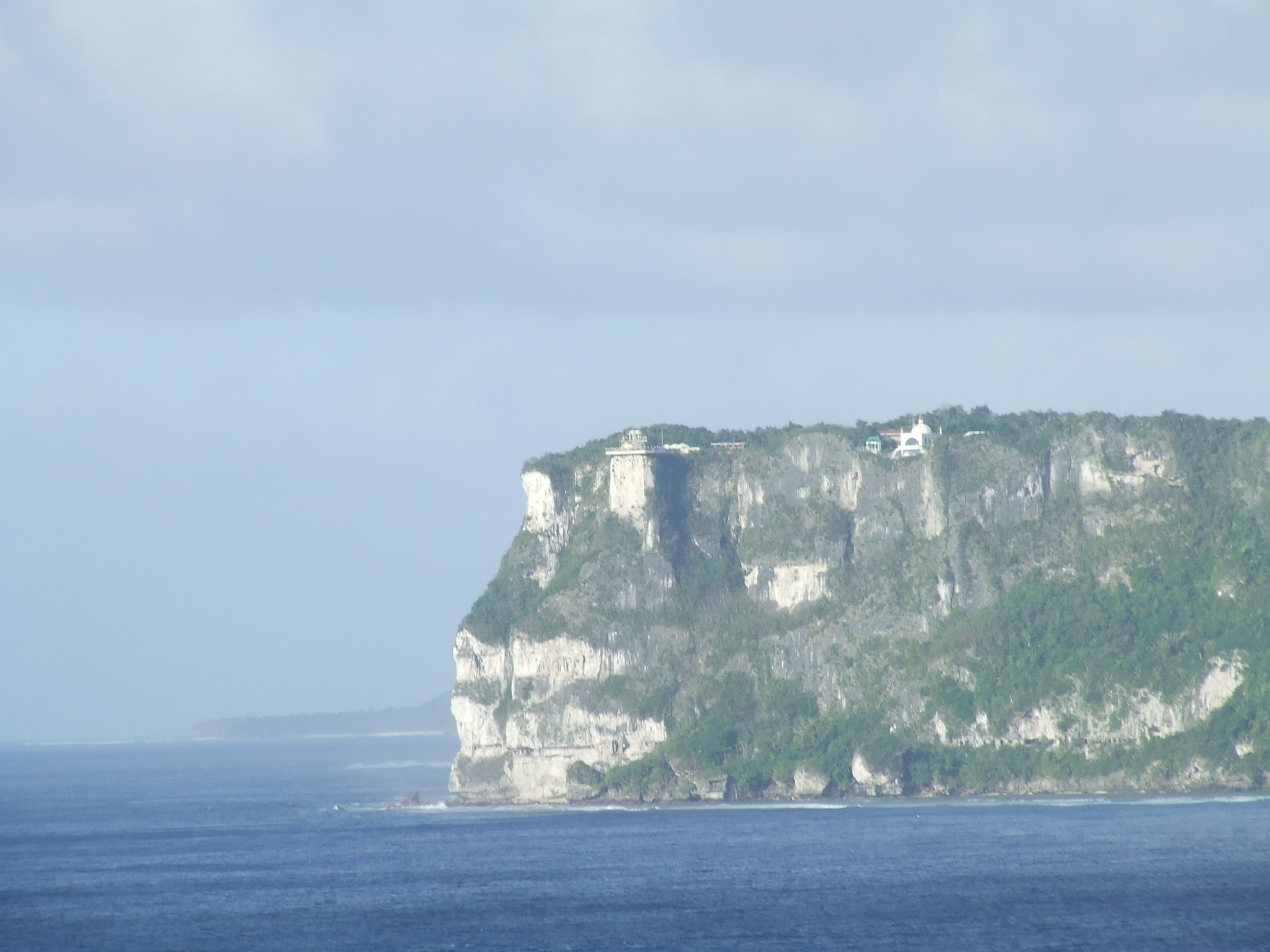
Two Lovers Point is a dramatic limestone cliff

A popular Guam folktale recounts how two lovers who were not allowed to be together by society tied their hair and leapt to their deaths from Puntas Dos Amantes rather than be apart. However, the details of the story have changed considerably since it was first recorded by French explorer Louis de Freycinet in 1819. In Freycinet's recounting, a man of the high-caste matao fell in forbidden love with a woman of the lower-caste manachang. They wandered in the wilderness eventually burying their infant in a stone cairn. In despair, they climbed to the top of a steep peak by the sea, tied their hair together, and, holding one another, jumped to their deaths. During Guam's Spanish colonial period, the location was called Cabo de los Amantes (Lovers’ Cape).

However, the popular modern retelling includes the Spanish history of the island: once there was a beautiful young woman from Hagåtña who was the daughter of a Spanish businessman and a prominent woman who was herself the daughter of a maga’låhi, or great Chamorro chief. The woman ran away from home after learning that her father had arranged her marriage to a Spanish ship captain. On the north shore of Guam, she met and fell in love with a young and gentle Chamorro man. She eventually returned home with the promise that she would return to him. However, the woman's father was angry when he learned of his daughter's lover and demanded she immediately marry the Spanish captain. She ran away at sunset that day and met her Chamorro lover. But her father, the captain, and all of the Spanish soldiers pursued them to the high cliff above Tumon Bay. Cornered, the two lovers tied their long black hair into a single knot, kissed, and threw themselves from the cliff, to the horror of the soldiers.

== Tourism ==
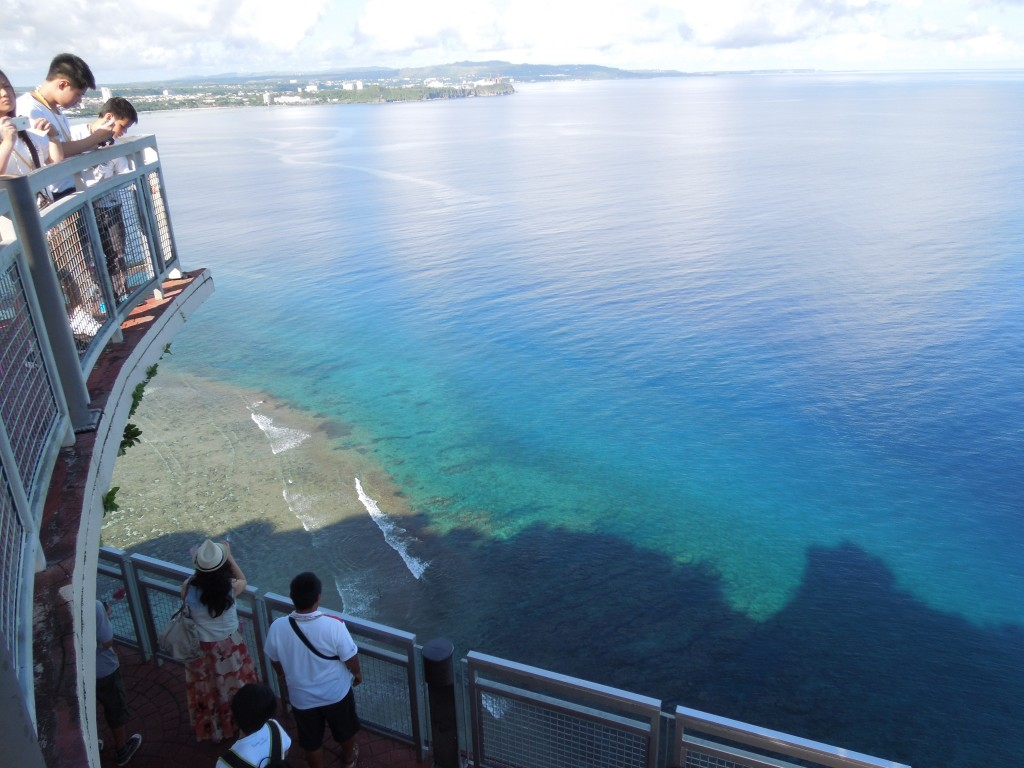
Viewing platforms overlook Tumon Bay and the Philippine Sea

Two Lovers Point is Guam's most famous landmark. While the land is owned by the Government of Guam, the first term administration of Governor Carl Gutierrez (1995-1999) initiated a public-private partnership to develop the site with Calvo Enterprises, a company owned by former governor Paul McDonald Calvo. The partnership was held up by Senator James Moylan in 2019 as a good model for future island improvements.

Two Lovers Point was reported in 2019 to attract 500,000 visitors to its park annually, and 360,000 to 400,000 to the lookout point itself. It includes a gift shop and facilities to host weddings. The site includes a sister bell with other "Lovers Points" in Kashiwazaki, Niigata and Izu, Shizuoka. An independently operated restaurant, Terraza Dos Amantes, operates on the site.

In 2002, Super Typhoon Pongsona damaged and toppled the metal statue of the two lovers at the site. In 2013, Guam businessman David Barnhouse visited Two Lovers Point with his soon-to-be wife Nancy. Recounting rumors that the statue was still lying in a junkyard somewhere on Guam, David vowed that if the statue still existed that he would repair it and return it to the site as a symbol of his love for Nancy. Two years later, Nancy mentioned this to Moses S. Chong, the owner of Green Guam Corporation, who stated that the statue was lying in his scrapyard, explaining that he had bought it for scrap but "never had the heart to melt it down." The Barnhouses bought the rusting statue and paid a local fabricator to spend five months carefully repairing it. On October 15, 2015, the second wedding anniversary of the Barnhouses, they returned the statue to Two Lovers Point, where it still stands.

== In popular culture ==
"Two Lovers Point" is mentioned in the lyrics of "Do It Again", a 2015 song by Pia Mia, who was born on Guam.

== See also ==
- Chamorro people
- Geography of Guam
- List of National Natural Landmarks in Guam
