= Facpi Point =

Headland in Guam

Coordinates: 13°20′23″N 144°37′59″E

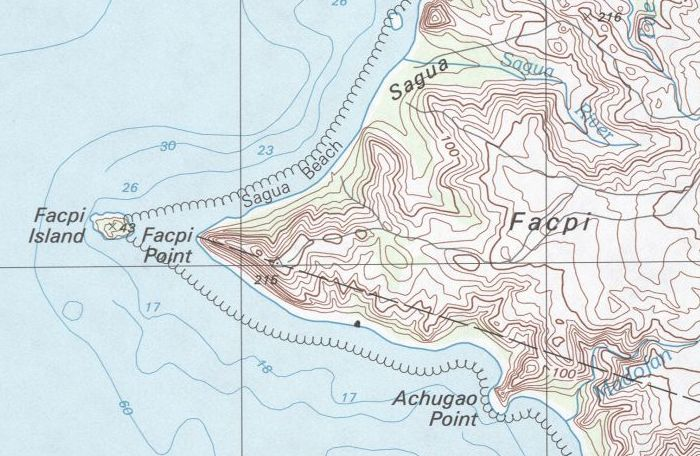
2010 map of Facpi Point

Facpi Point is a headland in the south-west of the island of Guam. It is 3 km (2 mi) due west of Mount Lamlam, and 5 km (3 mi) north of Umatac village. The point was designated a National Natural Landmark in 1972. Facpi Point marks the southern end of Agat Bay, as well as an end point of the boundary between the villages of Agat and Umatac. A small islet, Facpi Island, is off the tip of the point.
