= Mount Bolanos =

Mountain in Guam

- Location within Guam

Highest point
- Elevation: 368 m (1,207 ft)
- Coordinates: 13°17′53″N 144°41′06″E

Geography
- Location: Guam, Micronesia, U.S. territory
- Topo map: USGS Agat

Mount Bolanos is a south-west peak in the United States territory of Guam.

Rising to 368 meters (1,207 ft) above sea level, it is the 3rd highest peak in Guam (after Mount Lamlam and Mount Jumullong Manglo, and before Mount Almagosa).

Nearby are located the Bolanos Conservation Reserve (0.4 km) and the Bolanos River (1.6 km). The closest populated places are the villages of Umatac (4.5 km) and Agat (9 km). Farther to the north is the capital Hagåtña (25 km). Mount Bolanos is a boundary point between the villages of Umatac, Talofofo, and Inarajan.
