= Mount Almagosa =

Mountain in Guam

- Location within Guam

Highest point
- Elevation: 303 m (994 ft)
- Coordinates: 13°19′41″N 144°40′12″E

Geography
- Location: Guam, Micronesia, U.S. territory
- Topo map: USGS Agat

Geology
- Mountain type: Mountain

Mount Almagosa is the fourth highest peak on island of the United States territory of Guam. It is west of the Fena Valley Reservoir.

It is 303 meters (994 ft) above sea level.
