= Toves House =

- U.S. National Register of Historic Places
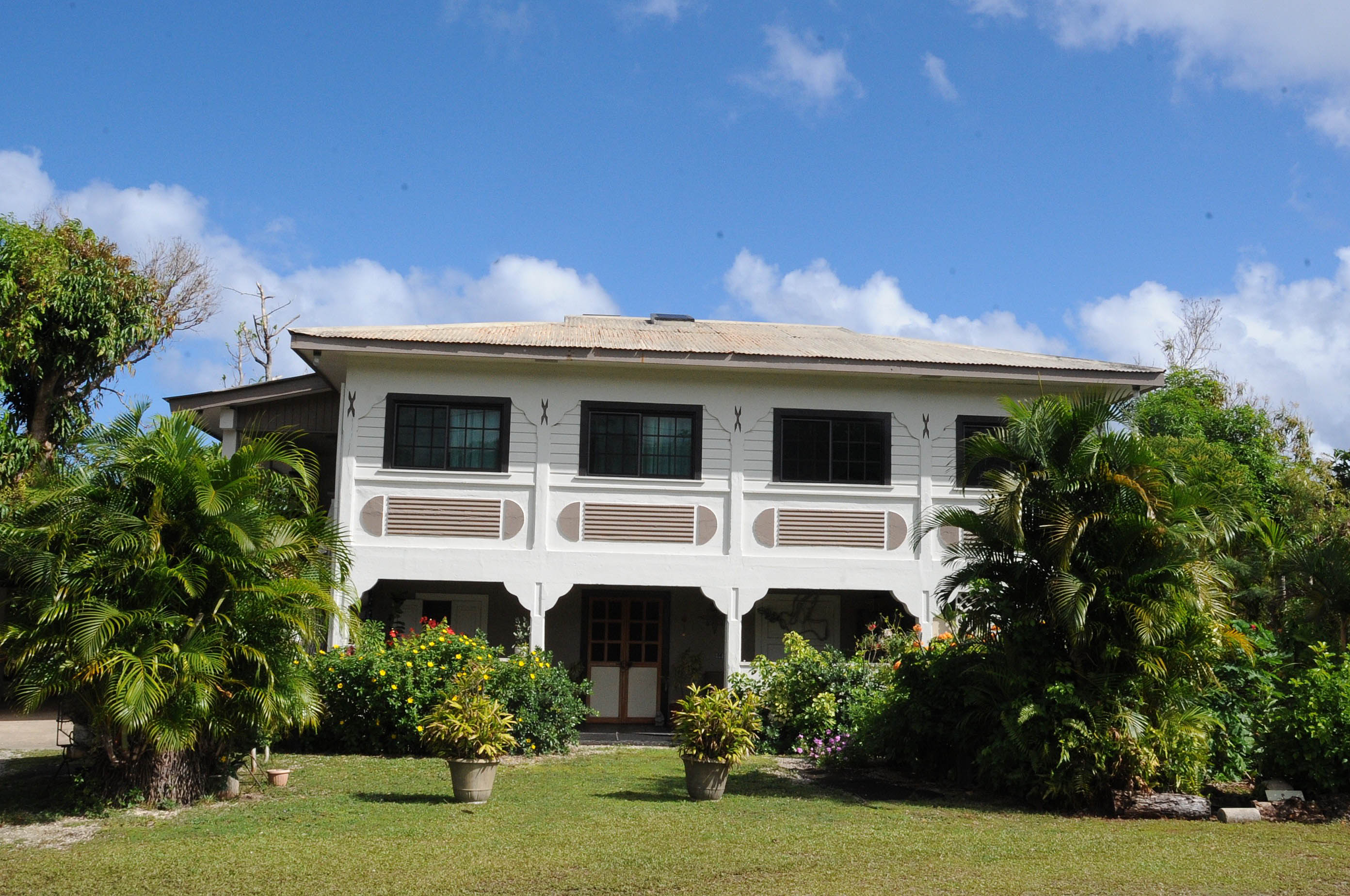
- Tove House in 2024

- Location within Guam
- Location: Marine Dr., Hagåtña, Guam
- Coordinates: 13°34′55″N 144°51′38″E
- Area: less than one acre
- Built: 1950
- Built by: Toves, Pedro T.
- Architectural style: Vern. Pacific Spanish Col.
- MPS: Agana Houses TR
- NRHP reference No.: 85000410
- Added to NRHP: February 8, 1985

Toves House, on Marine Dr. in the Anigua district of Hagåtña, Guam, was built in 1950, built mostly with ifil hardwood. It was a work of Pedro T. Toves in Pacific Spanish-Colonial vernacular architecture. It was listed on the National Register of Historic Places in 1985.

It was deemed significant for its architecture, as providing continuity to past usage of Pacific Spanish colonial design. Design-wise, it picked up where World War II's devastation of Guam had stopped evolution of the style. Unfortunately, is one of few surviving post-war examples, due to loss of the native ifil forests in World War II and other factors. Other post-war structures built of softwood have been destroyed by typhoons and termites.
