= Mount Jumullong Manglo =

Mountain in Guam

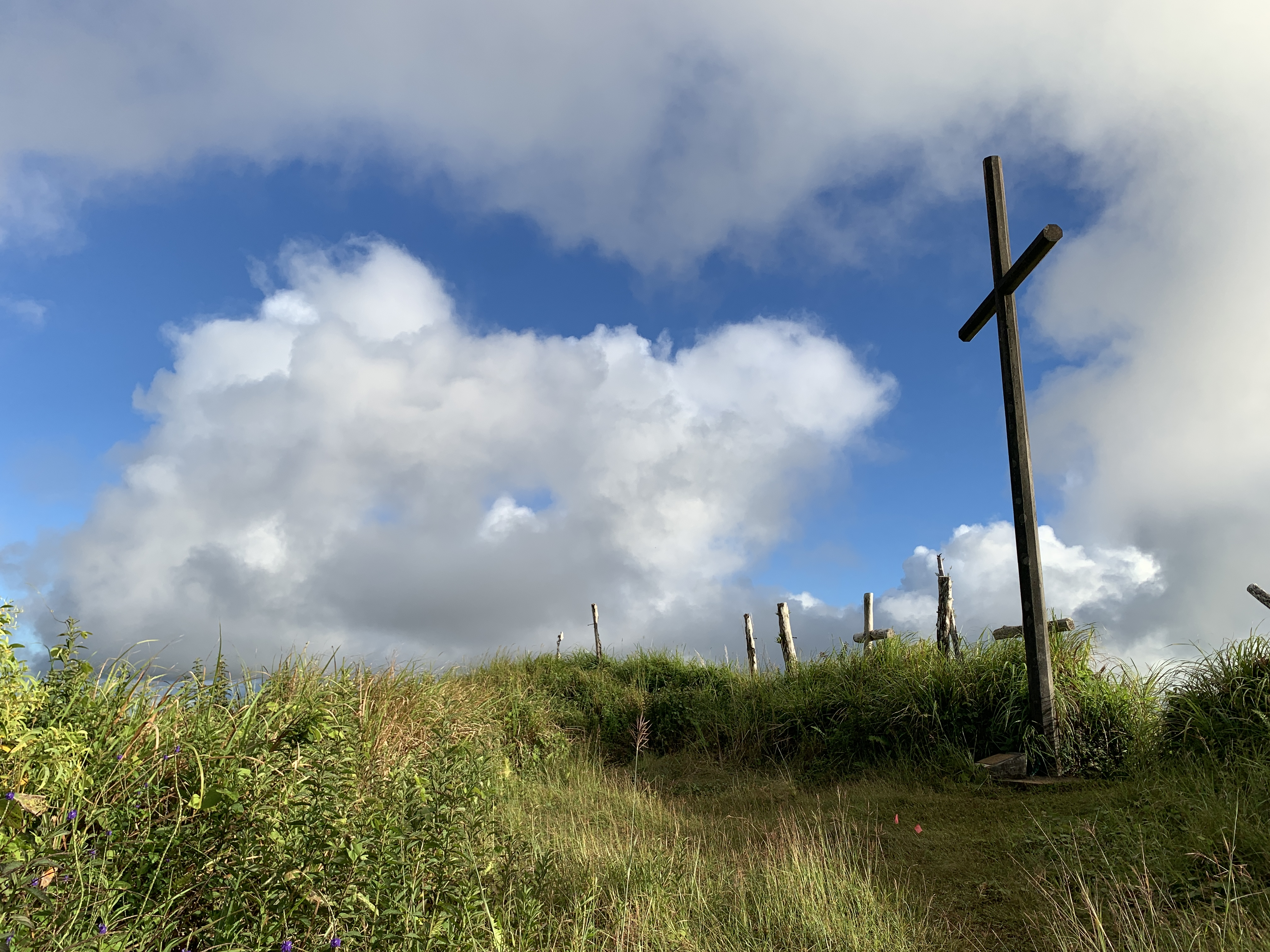

Highest point
- Elevation: 391 m (1,283 ft)
- Coordinates: 13°19′41″N 144°40′12″E

Geography
- Location within Guam
- Location: Guam, Micronesia, U.S. territory
- Topo map: USGS Agat

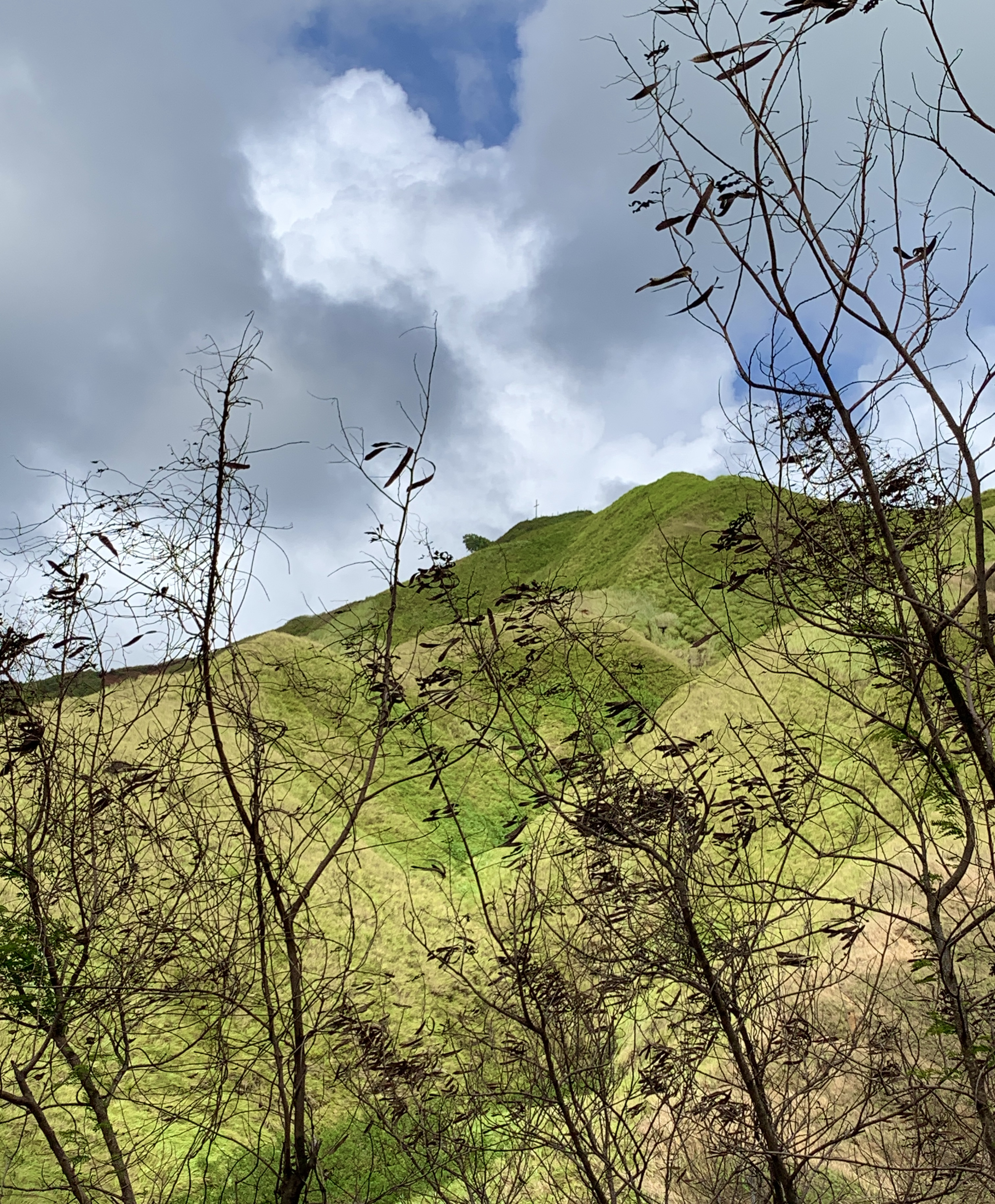
View of the peak

Mount Jumullong Manglo (sometimes shortened to Mount Jumullong) is a peak in the south-west of the island of the United States territory of Guam.

Rising to 391 meters (1,283 ft) above sea level, it is the 2nd highest peak in Guam (after Mount Lamlam, and before Mount Bolanos).

Nearby is located the village of Agat (6.1 km or 3.8 mi).
