= Fort San Jose =

- U.S. National Register of Historic Places
- Location within Guam
- Nearest city: Umatac, Guam
- Coordinates: 13°17′57″N 144°39′21″E
- Area: 2 acres (0.81 ha)
- Built: 1802
- NRHP reference No.: 74002041
- Added to NRHP: May 1, 1974

Fort San Jose is a former Spanish fortification on the island of Guam, now a United States territory. It is located north of the village of Umatac, on a hill overlooking both Fouha Bay and Umatac Bay, the place were Spanish galleons traveling between Manila in the Spanish Philippines and Acapulco, Mexico stopped for water and supplies.

== History ==
The fort was built about 1802 under the administration of Vicente Blanco, Governor of the Marianas. The route which the fort protected fell out of use in 1815 with Mexican independence, and it has been ruins since the 1850s.

The fort site was listed on the National Register of Historic Places in 1974.

== Architecture ==
The surviving foundational elements of the fort shape a wide semicircle, whose walls were about 2 feet (0.61 m) thick at the base, and now rise in places to a height of 4 feet (1.2 m). The remains of a watchtower stands 36 feet (11 m) southeast of the fort; its surviving walls rise to a height of about 5 feet (1.5 m).

== See also ==
- National Register of Historic Places listings in Guam
