= Canada Water Wells =

- U.S. National Register of Historic Places
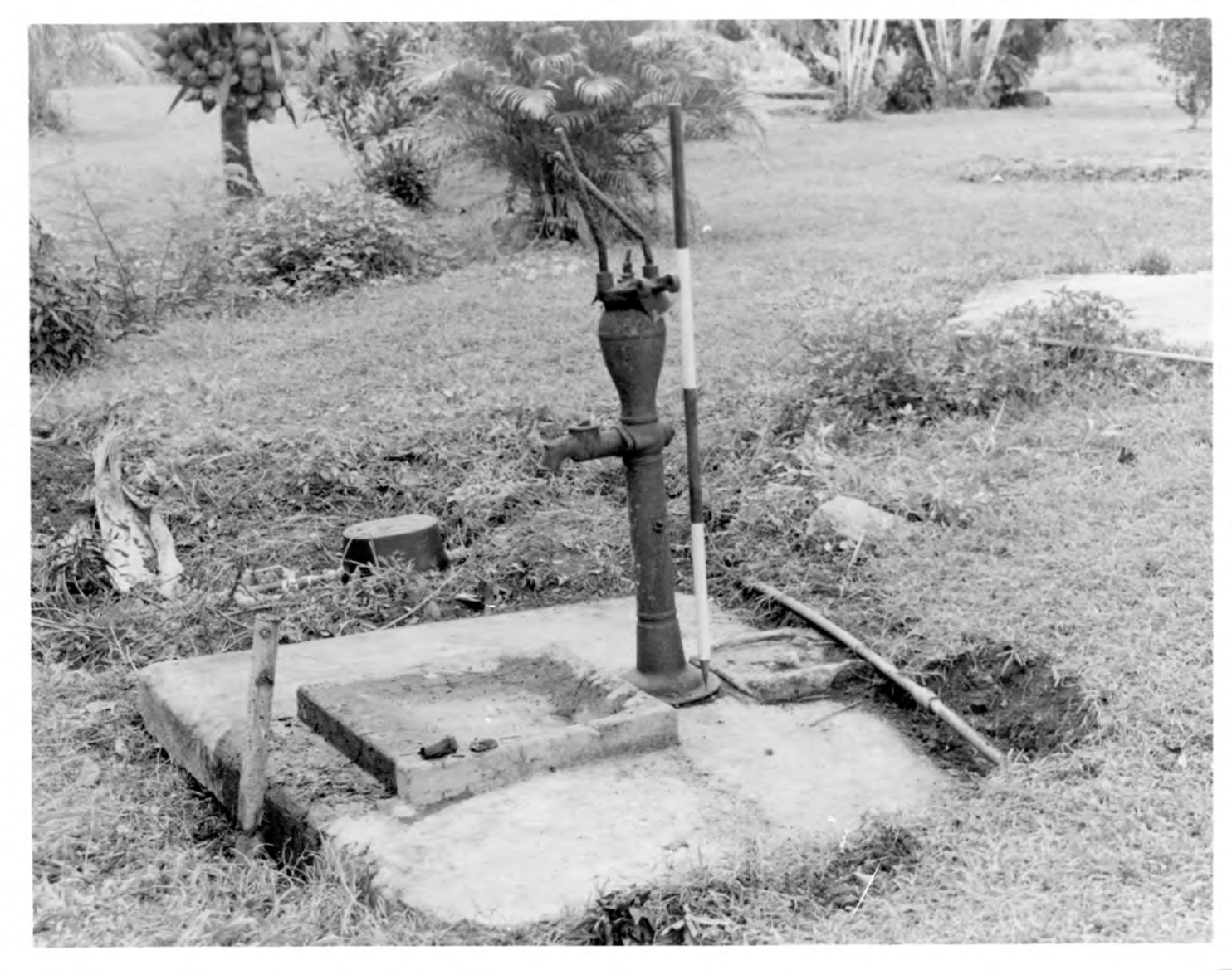

- Location within Guam
- Location: Near jct. of Canada-Toto Rd.& Canada -Toto Loop, Barrigada-Mangilao, Guam, or near junction of Canada–Toto Road and Canada–Toto Loop Road, Barrigada, Guam
- Coordinates: 13°27′42″N 144°47′4″E
- Area: less than one acre
- Built: 1937
- Architectural style: Late 19th and 20th Century Revivals
- NRHP reference No.: 08000165
- Added to NRHP: September 26, 2008

The Canada Water Wells, near jct. of Canada-Toto Rd.& Canada -Toto Loop Barrigada-Mangilao, Guam, are water works that were built in 1937.

They have also been known as Kanada, as Chochugu' and as To'tu. The structures were listed on the National Register of Historic Places in 2008; the listing included two contributing structures.

A U.S. Geological Survey report in 2003 described the water of Guam, including identifying that there are approximately 180 water wells serving the needs of Guam, drawing on a lens-shaped aquifer.
