= Fena Lake =

- Location within Guam
- Location: Guam
- Coordinates: 13°21′13.83″N 144°42′0.21″E
- Type: Man-made lake
- Primary inflows: Talofofo River
- Primary outflows: Talofofo River
- Basin countries: Guam

Fena Lake

The name “Fena” refers to the river valley, the man-made reservoir (sometimes called a lake), and the ancient village of Fena. The Fena Lake (Reservoir) is the largest lake in the United States territory of Guam and it is a man made reservoir. The Fena Valley Reservoir is critical in Guam's water management system. Located in the south-central part of the island, the reservoir is fed by three rivers, the Imong, Almagosa, and Maulap Rivers, which drain eastward into the Pacific Ocean. Also referred to as the Naval Magazine, the reservoir is currently off-limits to the public as it functions as an ammunition storage facility, operated and maintained by the U.S. Navy. The area is near Sånta Rita-Sumai and Hågat to the west and Talo’fo’fo to the east.

== History ==
=== Latte period (300-1700 AD) ===
The earliest known activity in Fena Valley was during the Latte Period, during which ancient CHamoru communities cultured food crops and established settlements. The valley was used for planting coconut palm, ifit, da’ok, bamboo, taro, yams, and bananas, providing both food and materials for shelter.

=== Spanish colonization (1700s) ===
Following Spanish colonization, there was reduced activity in the valley. Most Chamoru settlements were in the coast of the island as the Spanish forced their colonial rule. During the late 17th century, the Spanish began the reducción, a policy that relocated native populations to central villages under direct colonial control. Fena Valley, became a site for this relocation, though its use slowly shifted to farming land.

=== World War II and the Fena massacre ===
During the Japanese Occupation of Guam in World War II, Fena became the site of one of the island's most tragic events: the Fena Massacre. 30 young men and women were abused and killed in nearby caves, an event that is commemorated during Guam's Liberation Day. Following the war, the U.S. Navy seized the area, and since has been restricted to public access as part of the Naval Ordnance Annex.

=== Post-war developments and reservoir construction (late 1940s) ===
After the U.S. regained control of Guam from the Japanese in 1944, the U.S. Navy began constructing the Fena Reservoir. A dam was built to collect water from the Fena, Imong, Almagosa, and Maulap Rivers, which created the reservoir and supported a new water treatment plant. The $11 million project flooded the valley, submerging ancient CHamoru sites, relics, and agricultural land.

=== Fena reservoir sedimentation and storage decline (2014) ===
A bathymetric survey conducted in 2014 revealed sediment buildup, especially in the southern section of the Fena Reservoir, downstream from the Imong and Almagosa Rivers. As a result, the total storage capacity of the reservoir decreased by 17 percent, from 8,365 acre-feet in 1951 to 6,915 acre-feet in 2014. The live storage capacity fell by 6 percent, while the dead storage capacity dropped by 43 percent. Most of the capacity loss occurred in the dead storage area, which extends southward from the dam to the submerged intersection of the Almagosa and Fena Rivers. The sediment has completely buried the river channels in this area, further contributing to reduced storage. Although sedimentation in the live storage area is expected to continue, the long-term effects on reservoir management are uncertain due to the lack of data and research on sedimentation rates. This situation parallels challenges faced at the Shasta Dam in California, where sedimentation has diminished storage capacity and affected water supply, hydroelectric power generation, and flood control.

=== Water infrastructure integration efforts (2015) ===
The future operation of the Fena Valley Reservoir remains uncertain, as discussions regarding the potential integration of military and civilian water infrastructure continue to unfold. According to Mark Miller, interim General Manager of the Guam Waterworks Authority (GWA) in an interview with Post Guam, the transfer of the Fena Reservoir is not currently part of these discussions.

The push for system integration is grounded in a 2010 memorandum of understanding (MOU) between GWA and the U.S. Navy. This MOU was established to foster cooperation between the two entities regarding utility systems, to streamline water infrastructure in preparation for the island's growing population and the increasing demands of the military presence. Miller emphasized that such collaboration could lead to significant cost reductions, especially for the extensive energy demands of pumping water across the island. For example, GWA might be able to provide water to Naval Hospital by using nearby wells and reservoir, rather than relying on the energy draining process of pumping water from the Fena treatment plant in Santa Rita.

== Geology ==
The Fena Valley Reservoir collects water from the following rivers: the Imong, Almagosa, Maulap, Sadog Gaso, and Mahlac Rivers. The area's geology is mainly composed of rocks from the Umatac Formation, which feature weathered volcanic rocks, along with aged limestone formations found at higher elevations.

At about 33 meters (108 feet) above sea level, the reservoir spans approximately 0.30 square miles and has a drainage area of 5.88 square miles. It is the largest open body of freshwater in Guam, formed by the construction of an earthen dam in 1951. The dam, standing at 85 feet (26 meters) high and stretching 1,050 feet (320 meters) long, created a reservoir that holds approximately 9.7 million cubic meters ( 2.3 billion gallons) of water. During the rainy season, the reservoir can reach depths of up to 20 meters (60 feet). The surrounding terrain includes steep vegetated forests, savannah grasslands, and limestone formations, providing rich habitats for wildlife.

The valley's subsurface is characterized by a highly permeable surficial layer in the western part of the watershed, where rainfall infiltrates into the soil and underlying rocks, which later resurfaces through springs that contribute to the reservoir's water supply. It is noted that volcanic soils in the region are highly weatherable when vegetation is cleared, which is a concern for erosion and sedimentation that can contribute to loss of storage capacity in the reservoir.

== Ecology ==
The wetland areas support diverse ecosystems, including savannah grasslands and ravine forests. Fena is home to Guam's largest population of common moorhens (Gallinula chloropus guami) and historically provided habitat for the Marianas fruit bat (Pteropus mariannus), though the species is no longer present. The reservoir supports eels, tilapia, catfish, gobies, flagtails, and shrimp, while the valley's forests shelter pigs, deer, and brown tree snakes. The introduction of feral water buffalo (carabao, Bubalus bubalis) has led to overgrazing and erosion in certain regions.

== Latte Stones of Fena ==
Fena is home to several latte stone sites of historical and cultural importance. Unfortunately, many of these latte stone sites have been damaged or displaced since the development of the Fena Reservoir.

=== Historical context and origin ===
According to informant Jose de Lizama of Hågat (age 109 years), a large rock called Sagman, resembling a canoe, was transported to Fena by the men of Orote. This event occurred during a conflict with the men of Talofofo, and the Sagman was meant to block the entrance to Talofofo's reef. However, the Orote men were forced to leave the rock at Fena during daylight. This story highlights the connection between the people of Orote, Haputu, and Taipilan, linking the cultural landscape of Fena to the historical narratives of Guam.

=== Description of Latte stone sites ===
There are two main latte stone sites recorded in Fena:

1. Fena Latte Stones:
  - The Fena latte stones are located near the Talofofo River, with a series of 10 stones arranged in two parallel rows. These structures are cut from coral limestone, with the uprights shaped in a pyramid form, while the caps are inverted and smaller than the uprights, fitting atop. The stones are arranged in a specific formation, parallel to the river, approximately 50 feet from its banks. This formation is unique to Fena and the nearby Chandija district in south-central Guam.
2. Mepo Latte Stones:
  - Another notable site is Mepo (or Meppo), located near Fena. Mepo was the only site on Guam to have an upright latte structure with the capstone still placed atop the upright. However, these stones were moved in the 1940s to make space for the construction of the Naval Ammunition Depot Magazine 173. The latte stones were carefully stacked in three groups, and in 1955, they were transported to Hagåtña, where they now form part of the Angel Santos Memorial Park.

=== Destruction and preservation efforts ===
Unfortunately, the latte stones of Fena have faced significant degradation over the years. By the time archeologist Douglas Osborne visited Fena in 1947, the latte stones had been displaced due to the establishment of a skeet and .22 shooting range. Osborne described the latte remnants as being buried in thick grass and weeds near the cliffside. Other latte stone sets in the region, including those located along the Talofofo River, were also reported as being in various stages of disrepair. Some latte stones had been moved, while others had been destroyed, leaving behind only fragments.

In 1952, regional archeologist Erik Reed visited the area and confirmed that many latte stone sites, including Fena and Mepo, had been either moved or submerged, particularly due to the construction of the Fena Reservoir. Reed reported that the Mepo, Bona and Chandija sites were destroyed in the process.

=== Modern-day impact and legacy ===
The latte stones of Fena exist as fragmented remains scattered throughout the landscape, some submerged beneath the Fena reservoir. While much of the original latte stones in Fena have been lost or relocated.

== See also ==
- List of rivers of Guam
- List of lakes in Guam
