= Umang Dam =

- U.S. National Register of Historic Places
- Location within Guam
- Location: S. side of Finile Rd., Agat, Guam
- Coordinates: 13°22′38″N 144°39′27″E
- Area: less than one acre
- Built: c. 1898
- Architectural style: 20th century dam and irrigation
- NRHP reference No.: 08001408
- Added to NRHP: February 6, 2009

Umang Dam, located on the south side of Finile Rd. in Agat, Guam, was built in 1898. Also denoted 66-02-1868, it was listed on the National Register of Historic Places in 2009.

The site is given an 1898 date of significance in the National Register, but is described as a 20th-century public work and as having been "built in the early 1920s, mainly for agricultural purposes" before and during World War II.

It was then the fifth site in Agat and the 122nd in Guam to be placed on the National Register, and was termed "instrumental in the livelihood of the people of Agat."
