= Ylig River =

River in Guam

Coordinates: 13°23′33″N 144°46′04″E

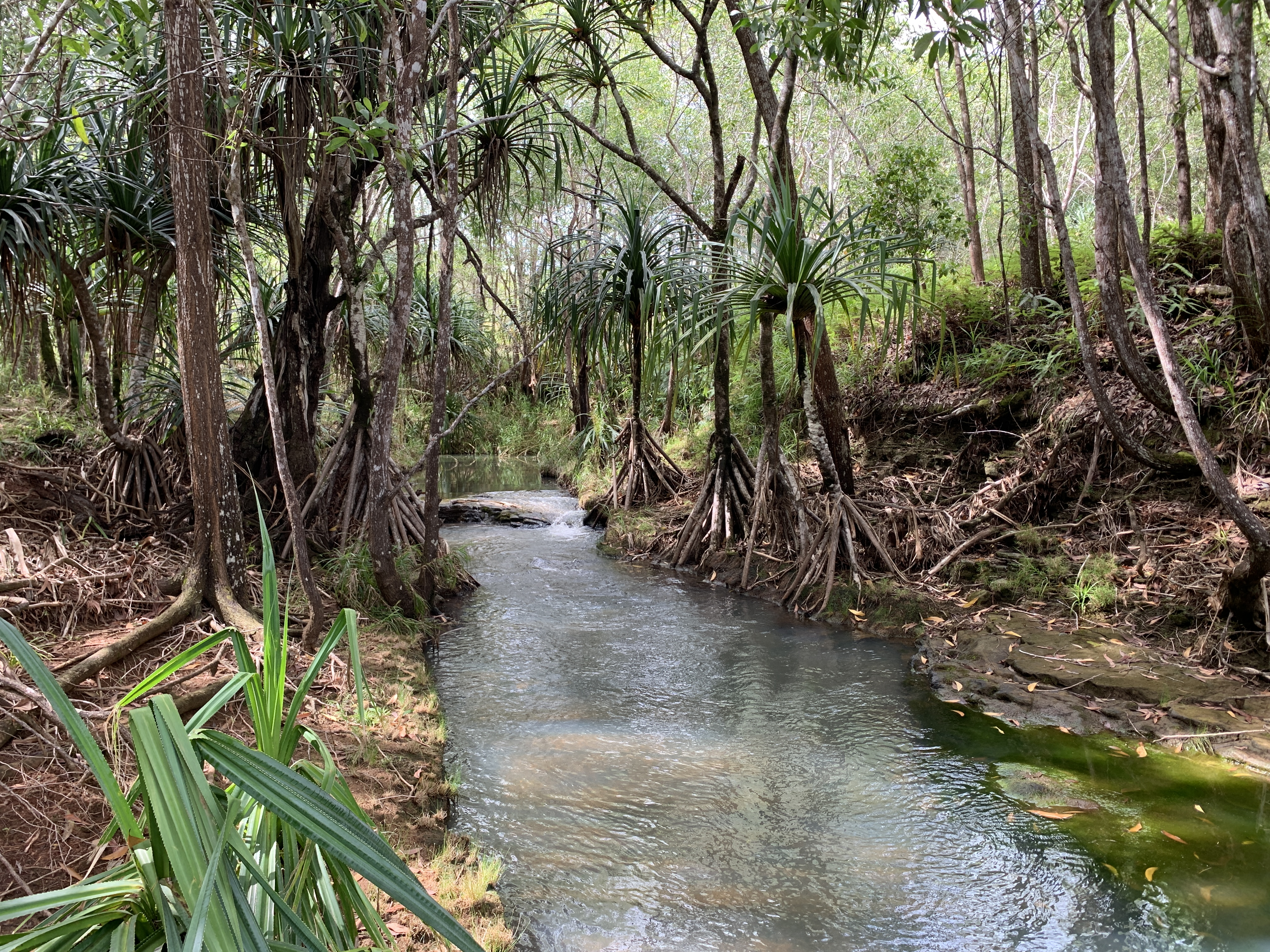

Location
- Country: United States
- Territory: Guam

Physical characteristics
- Source
  - location: North of Apra Heights, near west coast
- Mouth: Pacific Ocean
  - location: Central east coast, south of Yona
- Length: 6.83 m (22.4 ft)
- Basin size: 16.08 square miles (41.65 km2)

Basin features
- Tributaries
  - right: Tarzan River, Manengon River

The Ylig River is one of the longest rivers in the United States territory of Guam. Rising close to the west coast some three kilometres north of Apra Heights, it traverses the island, flowing into the sea in the central east coast, south of the town of Yona. The course of this river roughly parallels that of the Pago River, which lies around five kilometres to the north. It runs about 6.83 miles in length, and has a watershed area of 16.08 square miles. The Ylig has two tributaries, the Tarzan and the Manengon rivers.
