= Fouha Point =

National Natural Landmark in Guam

Coordinates: 13°18′42″N 144°39′03″E

Fouha Point, also known as Fouha Rock or Creation Point, is a National Natural Landmark on the United States territory of Guam. A natural rock formation, the point rises to some 150 feet (46 m) above the waters of Fouha Bay, close to the village of Umatac. The point was designated a National Natural Landmark in 1972. According to Chamorro legend, the rock is the resting place of the goddess Fu’una who, with her brother Puntan, created the world.
