= Guam Congress Building =

- U.S. National Register of Historic Places
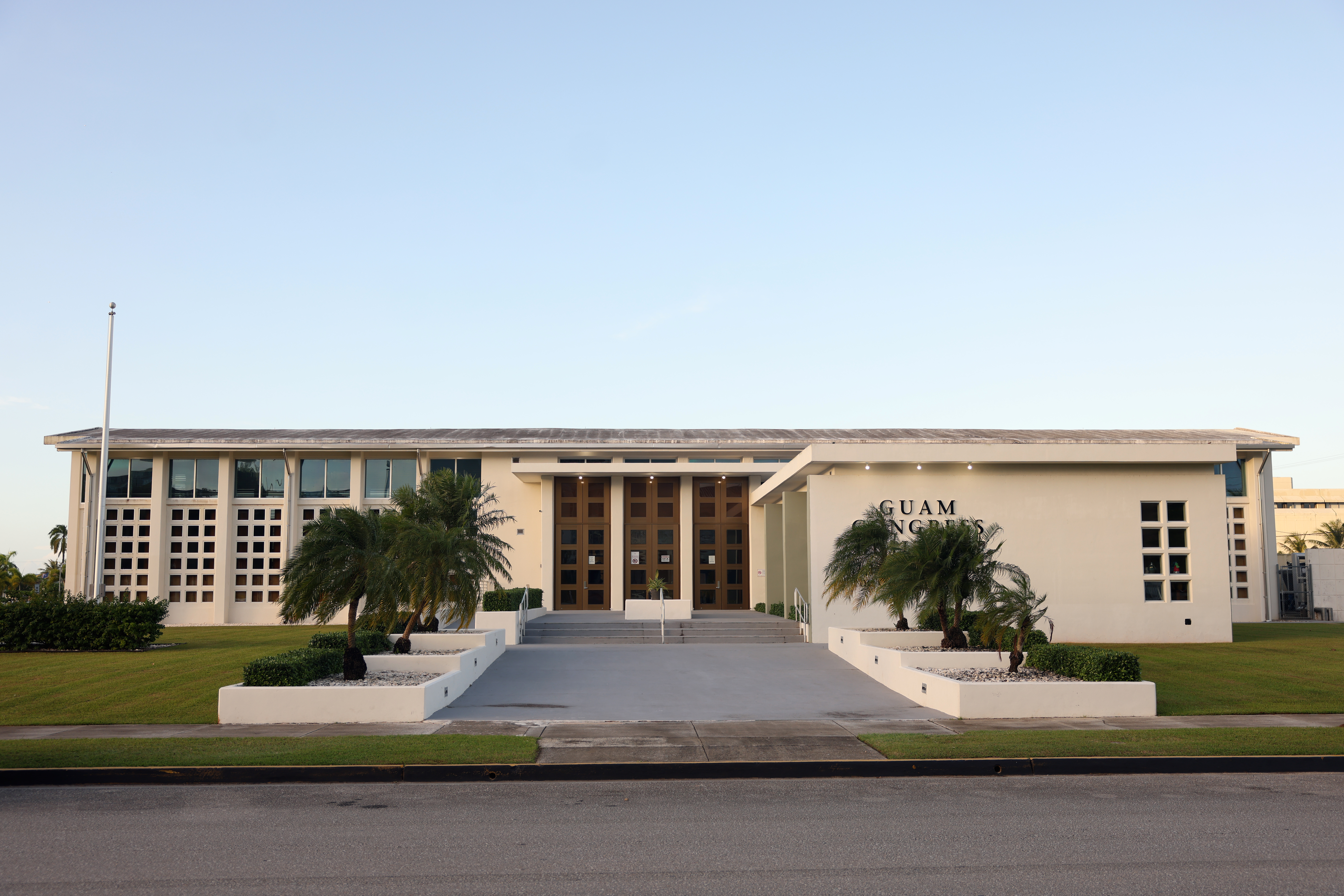

- Location within Guam
- Location: Chalan Santo Papa, Hagåtña, Guam
- Coordinates: 13°28′30″N 144°45′8″E
- Area: 1.6 acres (0.65 ha)
- Built: 1949; 77 years ago
- Built by: Pacific Island Builders; Brown & Root Pacific Bridge & Maxon
- Architectural style: Modern Movement
- NRHP reference No.: 06001320
- Added to NRHP: February 1, 2007

The Guam Congress Building, also known as the Guam Legislature Building, is the seat of the Legislature of Guam and is located in Chalan Santo Papa in Hagåtña, Guam. It was built in 1949 by Pacific Island Buildings and Brown & Root Pacific Bridge & Maxon. It has served as a capitol and as a courthouse building. It is a Modern Movement-style building that was listed on the U.S. National Register of Historic Places in 2007.

It is significant for its role in the history of the Chamorro people and their effort to end the dominant military rule of the United States Navy in 1950. The legislature moved to a new location in 1989 and two wings of the building were taken down; the building was then converted to house government offices. In December 2016, a restoration and energy efficiency upgrade of the Congress Building was completed, allowing the Legislature of Guam to reconvene in the building from January 2017 onwards, returning Senators to the historic structure full-time after a 27-year absence.

== See also ==
- National Register of Historic Places listings in Guam
