= Humåtak, Guam =

Coordinates: 13°17′53″N 144°39′32″E

Humåtak
- Village
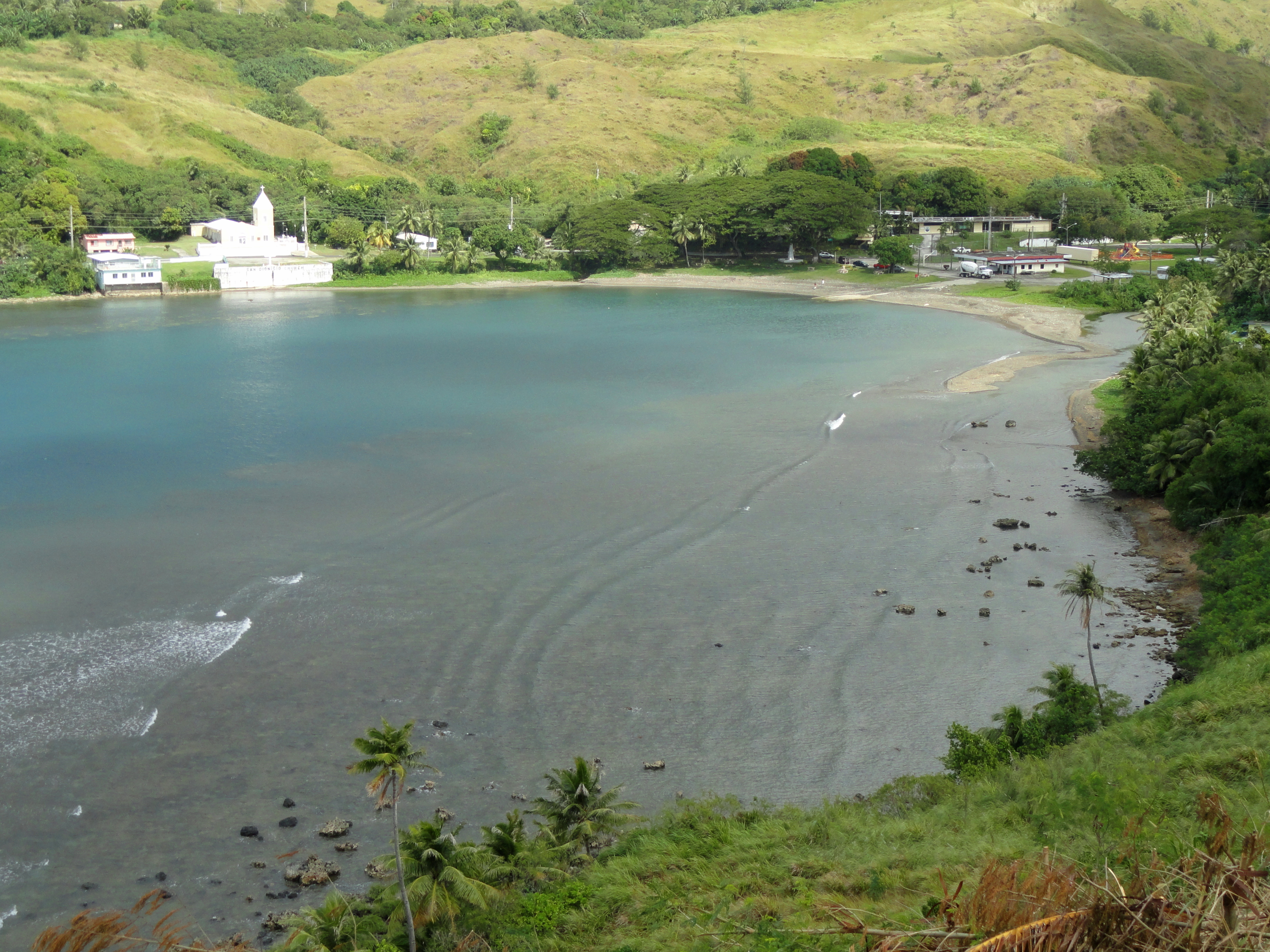

- Location of Umatac within the Territory of Guam.
- Country: United States
- Territory: Guam

Government
  - Mayor: Johnny A. Quinata (R)

Population (2020)
  - Total: 647
- Time zone: UTC+10 (ChST)

Humåtak, formerly known as Umatac, is a village on the southwestern coast of the United States territory of Guam. The month of March in the Chamorro language is "Umatalaf," or "to catch guatafi," which is believed to be the root word of Umatac. The village's population has decreased since the island's 2010 census, and it is by far the least populated village on the island.

Mount Bolanos, at an elevation of 368 m (1,207 ft), is the third highest peak of Guam and lies 4.5 km (2.8 mi) away.

On August 18, 2021, the municipality place name was officially changed from Umatac to Humåtak.

== History ==
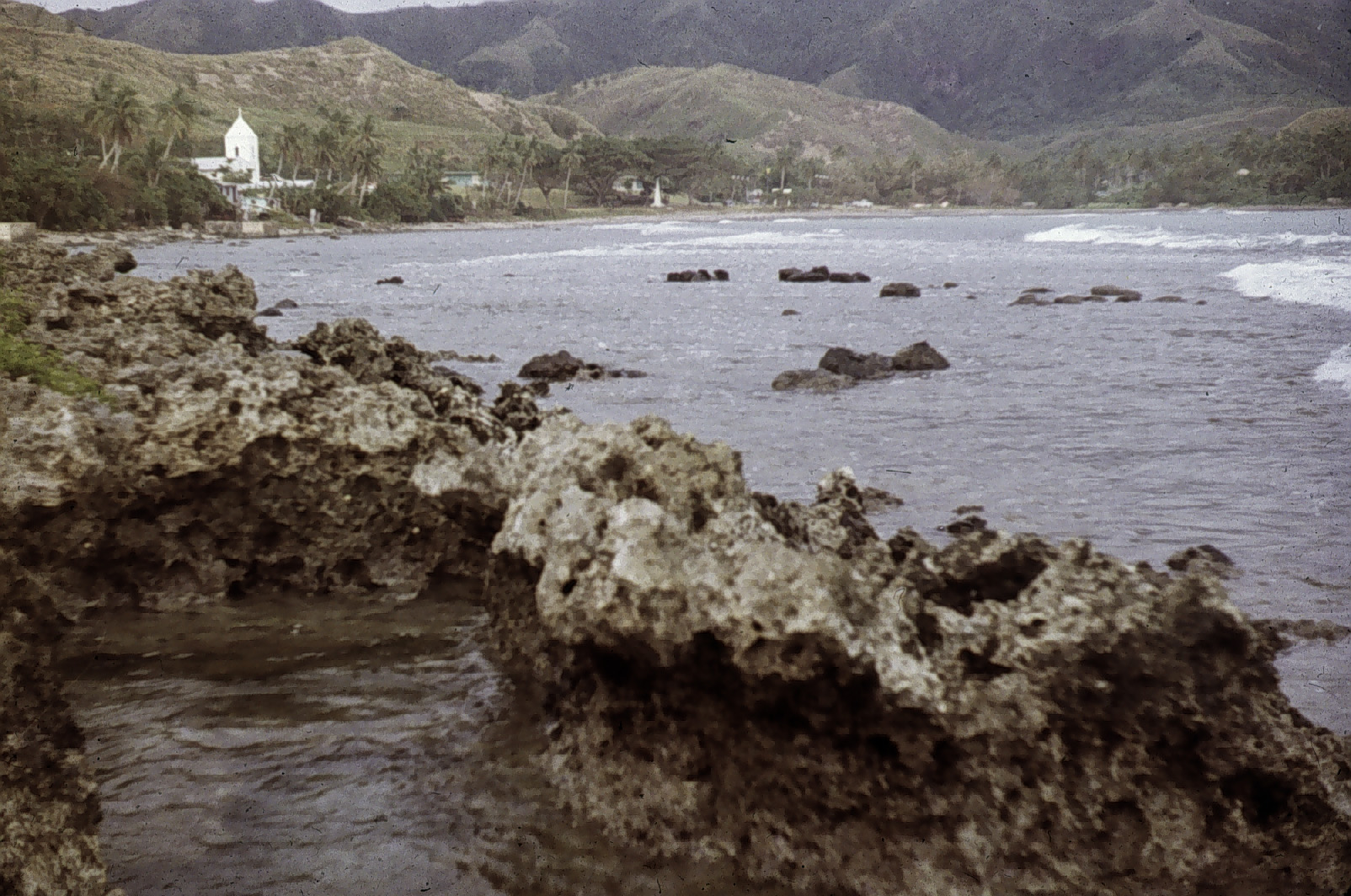
Ferdinand Magellan landing site

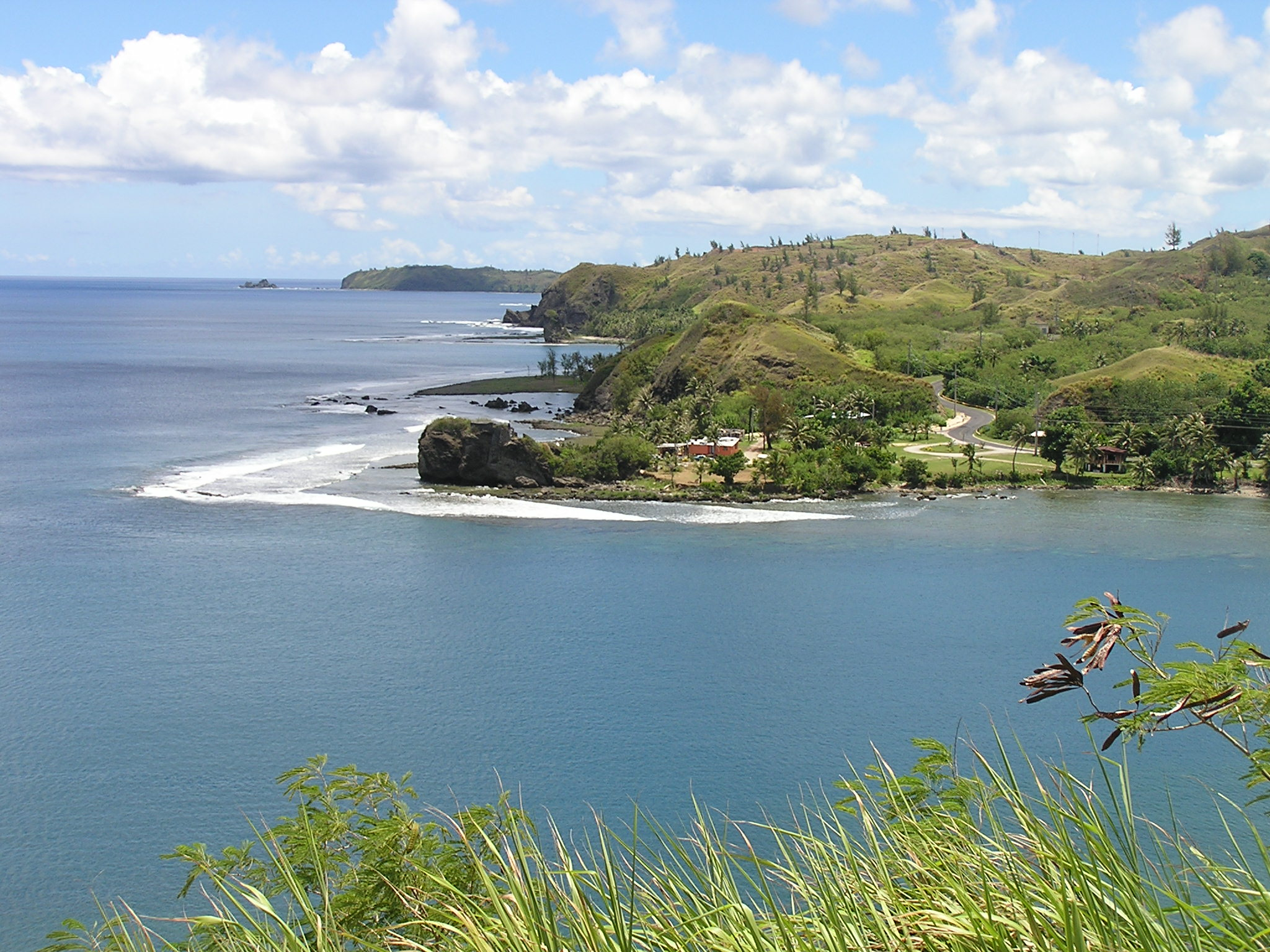
Coast North of Umatac Bay including Funa Rock

Historical population
Census	Pop.	Note	%±
1960	744		—
1970	813		9.3%
1980	732		−10.0%
1990	897		22.5%
2000	887		−1.1%
2010	782		−11.8%

Prior to Spanish arrival on the island, an annual celebration was held north of the village at Fouha Rock where the first humans were created according to the legends of the Chamorro people, the native people of Guam.

In 1521, the Portuguese Explorer Ferdinand Magellan arrived on Guam while circumnavigating the globe. Umatac Bay is traditionally cited as the location of the Spanish landing. Another explorer, Miguel López de Legazpi, arrived in Umatac in 1565 and claimed the island of Guam for Spain.

When Guam was colonized in the 17th century, the Spanish made Umatac a parish so the Chamorro people in the area could be converted to Christianity. Remains of two Spanish forts built on hills on either side of the village - Fort Nuestra Señora de la Soledad and Fort San Jose - are visible.

In 1898, Guam was taken by the United States during the Spanish–American War. Under the U.S. administration, the small village has grown gradually. The Discovery Day festival is held every year in the village. While the holiday was first established in memory of Magellan's discovery of the island, it is now a celebration of Chamorro culture.

In August 2021, Gov. Lou Leon Guerrero signed a bill officially changing the name of the village.

== Demographics ==
The U.S. Census Bureau designates one census-designated place, Umatac.

== Education ==
The Guam Department of Education serves the island. The F. Q. Sanchez Elementary School in Umatac has closed at the end of summer 2011 due to budget cuts. Students have shifted to a nearby Merizo Elementary School. The unused facility was then cleared for use by the Umatac Mayor's Office. Southern High School in Santa Rita serves the village.

In regards to the Department of Defense Education Activity (DoDEA), Umatac is in the school attendance zone for McCool Elementary and McCool Middle School, while Guam High School is the island's sole DoDEA high school. No DoDEA school buses go to Umatac.

== Mayor of Umatac ==
=== Commissioner ===
- Jesus T. Quinata (1961–1969)
- Jesus S. Quinata (1952–1961)
- Albert T. Topasna (1969–1973)

=== Mayor ===
- Albert T. Topasna (1st Term) (1973–1985)
- Cecilia Q. Morrison (1985–1989)
- Albert T. Topasna (2nd Term) (1989–1991)
- Dean D. Sanchez (1st Term) (1991–1993)
- Jose T. Quinata (1993–1997)
- Jesus A. Aquiningoc (1997–2001)
- Tony A. Quinata (2001–2005)
- Daniel Q. Sanchez (2005–2009)
- Dean D. Sanchez (2nd Term) (2009–2013)
- Johnny A. Quinata (2013–present)

== See also ==
- Villages of Guam
