= Mount Lamlam =

Mountain in Guam

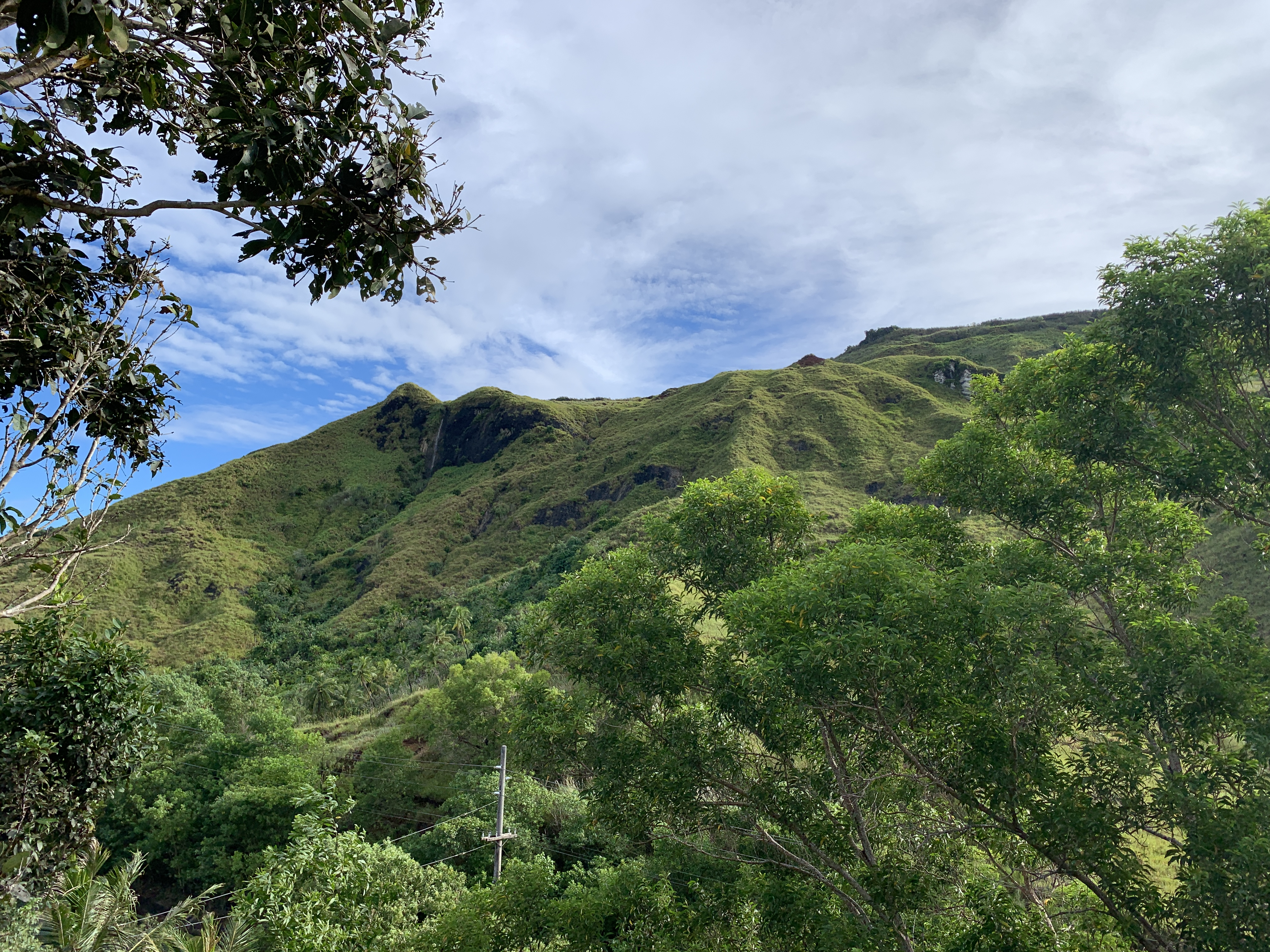
- Mount Lamlam

Highest point
- Elevation: 1,332 ft (406 m)
- Prominence: 1,332 ft (406 m)
- Coordinates: 13°20′19″N 144°39′46″E

Geography
- Location within Guam
- Location: Near Agat, Guam, Micronesia, U.S. territory
- Topo map: USGS Agat

Climbing
- Easiest route

U.S. National Natural Landmark
- Designated: 1972

Mount Lamlam (meaning lightning in Chamoru) is a peak on the United States island of Guam. It is located near the village of Agat (5 km or 3 mi north), in the south-west of the island.

Rising to 406 meters (1,332 ft) above sea level, the distance from the peak to the bottom of the nearby Mariana Trench is said to be the greatest change in elevation on Earth over such a short distance.

== See also ==
- List of mountain peaks of the United States
- List of U.S. states by elevation
