= List of Guam locations by per capita income =

This is a list of Guam locations by per capita income. As of the 2010 U.S. Census, Guam had a per capita income of $16,549. In the 2010 Census, Guam had a median household income of $48,274 — the highest of any U.S. territory. The median household income of Guam is higher than in other U.S. territories such as Puerto Rico and American Samoa.

Guam has no counties, and all of Guam is counted as one county-equivalent by the U.S. Census Bureau, so the figures for Guam are the same as for the Guam county-equivalent.

== Guam villages ranked by per capita income ==
Below is all 19 of the villages of Guam ranked by per capita income according to the 2010 U.S. Census results (for 2009 data). The median household income and population of each village is also included.

Rank	Village	Per capita income (2010 Census)	Median household income (2010 Census)	Population (2010 Census)
1	Piti	$26,303	$61,094	1,454
2	Tamuning (incl. Tumon)	$22,182	$44,213	19,685
3	Asan-Maina	$21,626	$56,576	2,137
4	Sånta Rita-Sumai, Guam	$20,298	$59,914	6,084
5	Talo'fo'fo, Guam	$19,304	$64,083	3,050
6	Barrigada	$19,279	$60,323	8,875
7	Agana Heights	$19,276	$51,389	3,808
8	Sinajana	$18,492	$53,289	2,592
9	Yona	$18,270	$60,321	6,480
10	Chalan-Pago-Ordot	$17,882	$56,429	6,822
11	Hågat, Guam	$16,551	$50,543	4,917
12	Hagåtña	$16,093	$37,083	1,051
13	Inalåhan	$15,816	$55,750	2,273
14	Mongmong-Toto-Maite	$15,675	$39,674	6,825
15	Mangilao	$15,580	$49,091	15,191
16	Malesso, Guam	$13,962	$55,673	1,850
17	Yigo	$13,949	$47,095	20,539
18	Dededo	$13,550	$43,896	44,943
19	Humåtak	$13,546	$48,750	782
