= List of beaches in Guam =

This is a list of beaches in Guam, clockwise starting from the northernmost tip of the island, with the name of the village it is in.

- Ritidian Point (Dededo), in the Guam National Wildlife Refuge
- Jinapsan Beach (Yigo), restricted access on Andersen Air Force Base

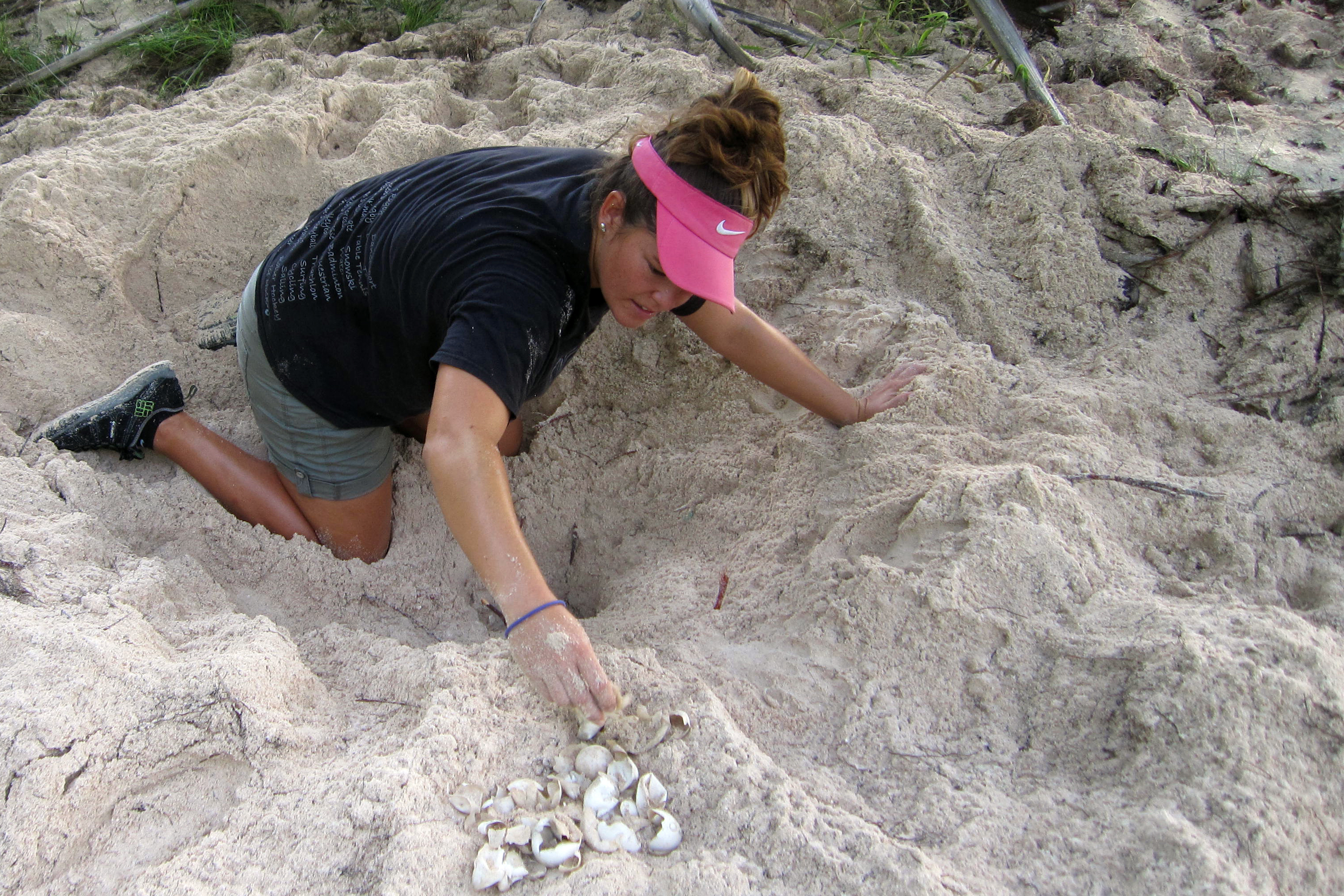
A University of Guam marine biologist inventories sea turtle eggs on Andersen Air Force Base

- Tarague Beach (Yigo), restricted access on Andersen Air Force Base
- Scout Beach (Yigo), restricted access on Andersen Air Force Base
- University of Guam Marine Lab Beach (Mangilao)
- Taga'chang Beach (Yona)
- Togcha Bay (Talofofo), the location of the restaurant Jeff's Pirate Cove
- Ipan Beach Park (Talofofo)
- Jones Beach (Talofofo)
- Calvo's Beach (Talofofo)

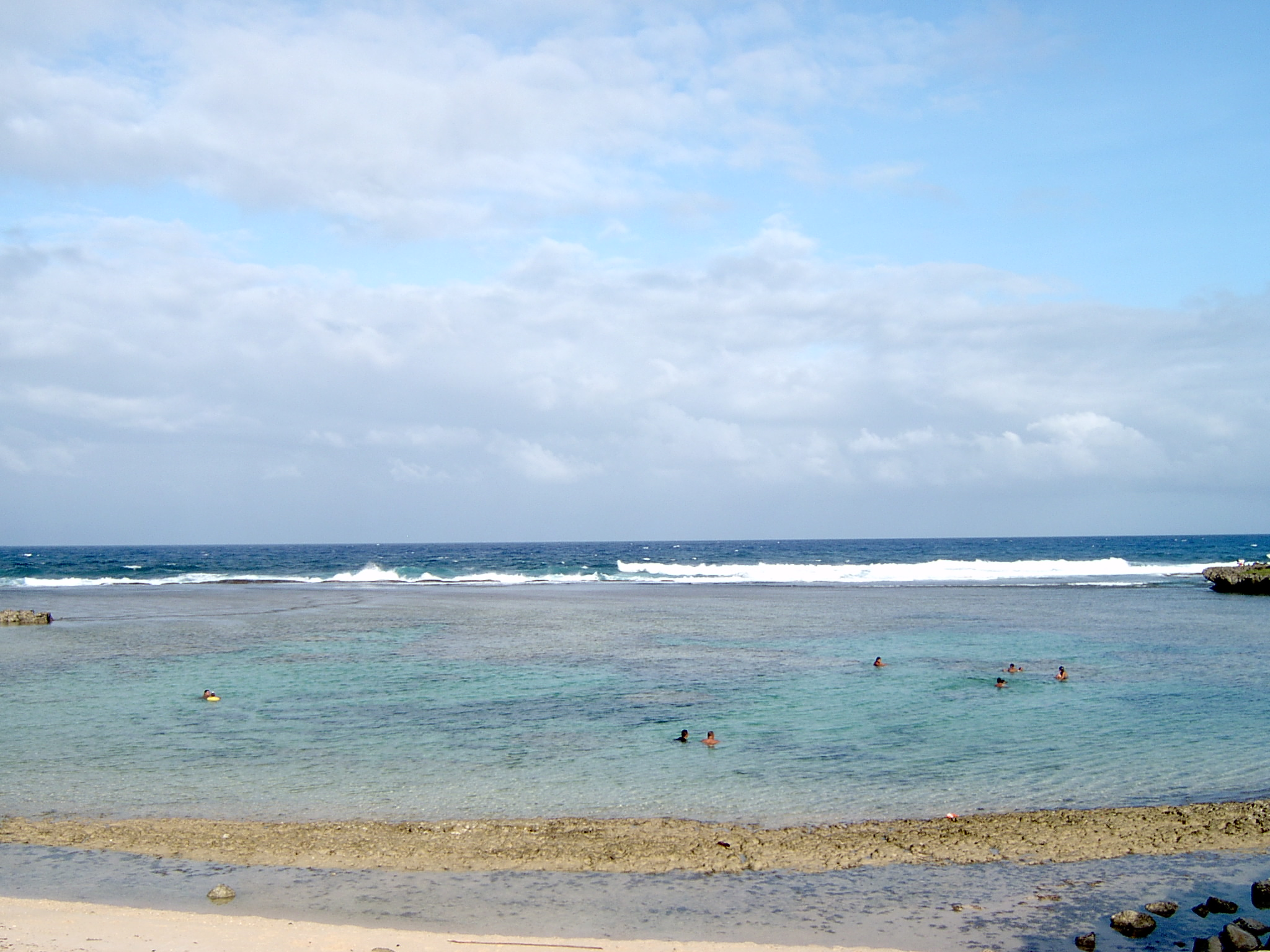
First Beach in southeastern Guam

- First Beach (Talofofo)
- Talofofo Beach (Talofofo), at Talofofo Bay
- Inarajan Pools (Inarajan), also called Salaglula Pools
- Atao Beach (Inarajan)
- Cocos Island (Merizo), the largest island off the coast of Guam and the southernmost beach on this list
- Piga Beach (Merizo)
- Bile Bay (Merizo)
- Ajmo Beach (Merizo)
- Nimitz Beach Park (Agat)

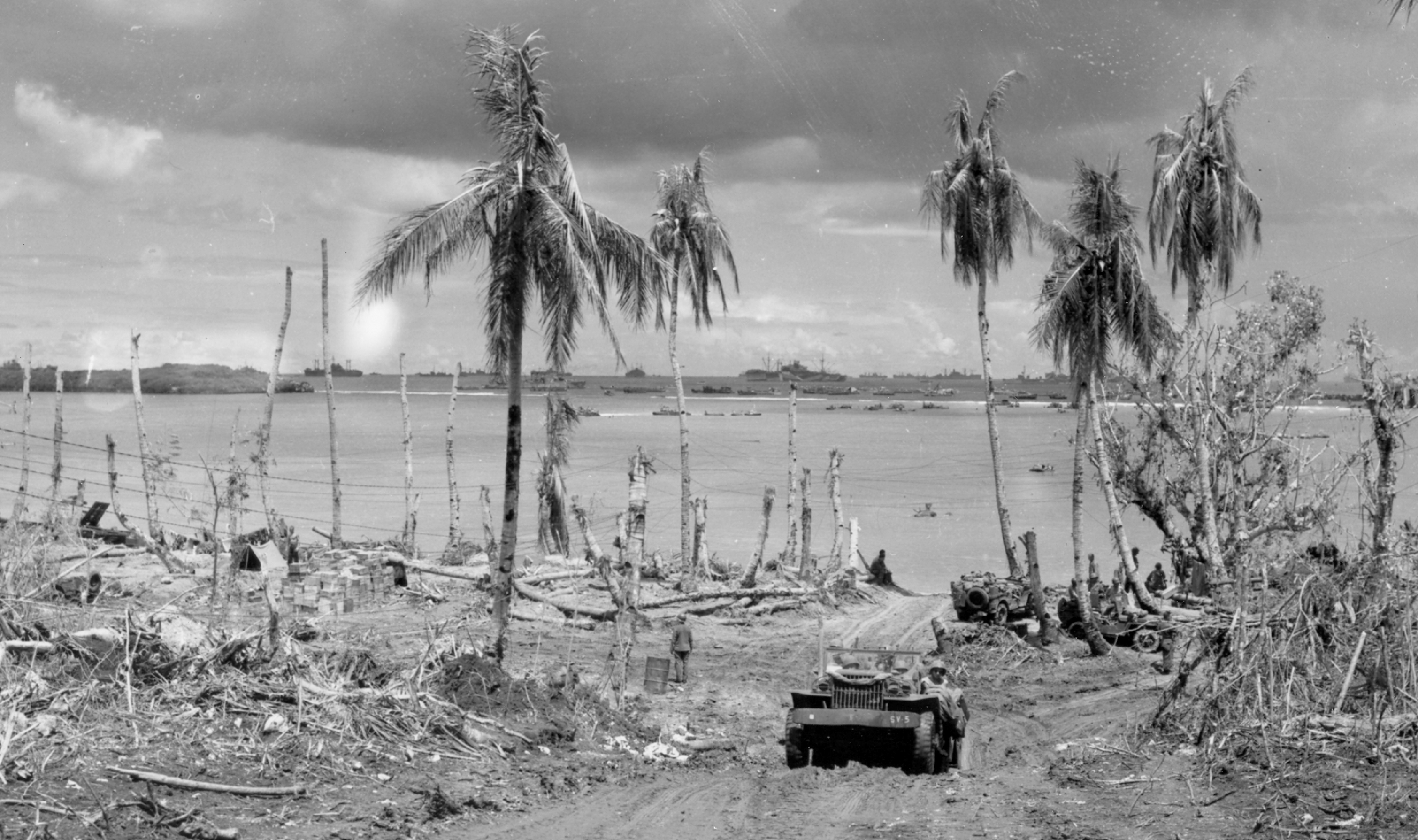
American forces push onto Agat Beach in the southwest during the 1944 Battle of Guam

- Agat Beach (Agat), NHRP-listed Agat Invasion Beach of the 1944 Battle of Guam, part of War in the Pacific National Historical Park
- Rizal Beach (Agat)
- Dadi Beach (Santa Rita), restricted access on Naval Base Guam
- Gab Gab Beach (Santa Rita), restricted access on Naval Base Guam
- San Luis Beach (Santa Rita), restricted access on Naval Base Guam
- Fantasy Island (Piti), restricted access on Naval Base Guam
- Family Beach (Piti)
- Pedro Santos Memorial Park (Piti)
- Tepungan Beach (Piti), also known as FishEye Marine Park
- Asan Beach Park (Asan-Maina), NHRP-listed Asan Invasion Beach of the 1944 Battle of Guam, part of War in the Pacific National Historical Park
- Asan Beach (Asan-Maina)
- West Hagåtña Beach Front / Agana Bay Beach (Hagåtña)
- Dungca's Beach / Trinchera Beach (Hagåtña)

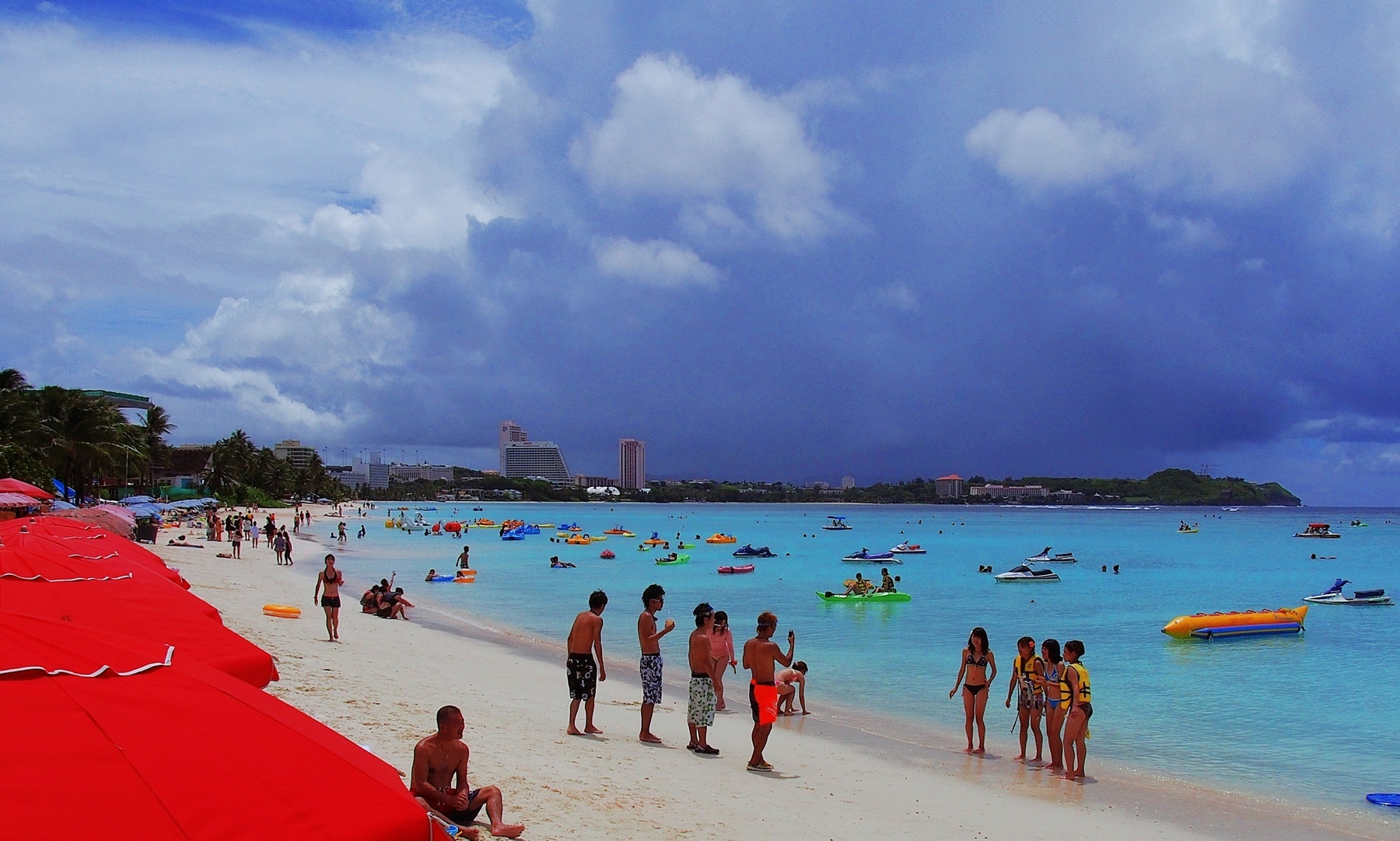
Beaches in Tumon, the tourist center of Guam

- "Tumon Beach" is an umbrella term for the shoreline of Tumon Bay, Guam's tourist center, which is divided into variously named beaches and parks
  - Ypao Beach (Tumon)
  - Matapang Beach (Tumon)
  - Gun Beach (Tumon)
  - Faifai Beach (Tumon), includes the NHRP-listed Fafai Beach Site
- Tanguisson Beach (Dededo)
- Shark's Hole Beach (Dededo)
- Haputo Beach (Dededo), restricted access on Naval Computer and Telecommunications Station Guam, includes the NHRP-listed Haputo Beach Site
- Double Reef Beach (Dededo)

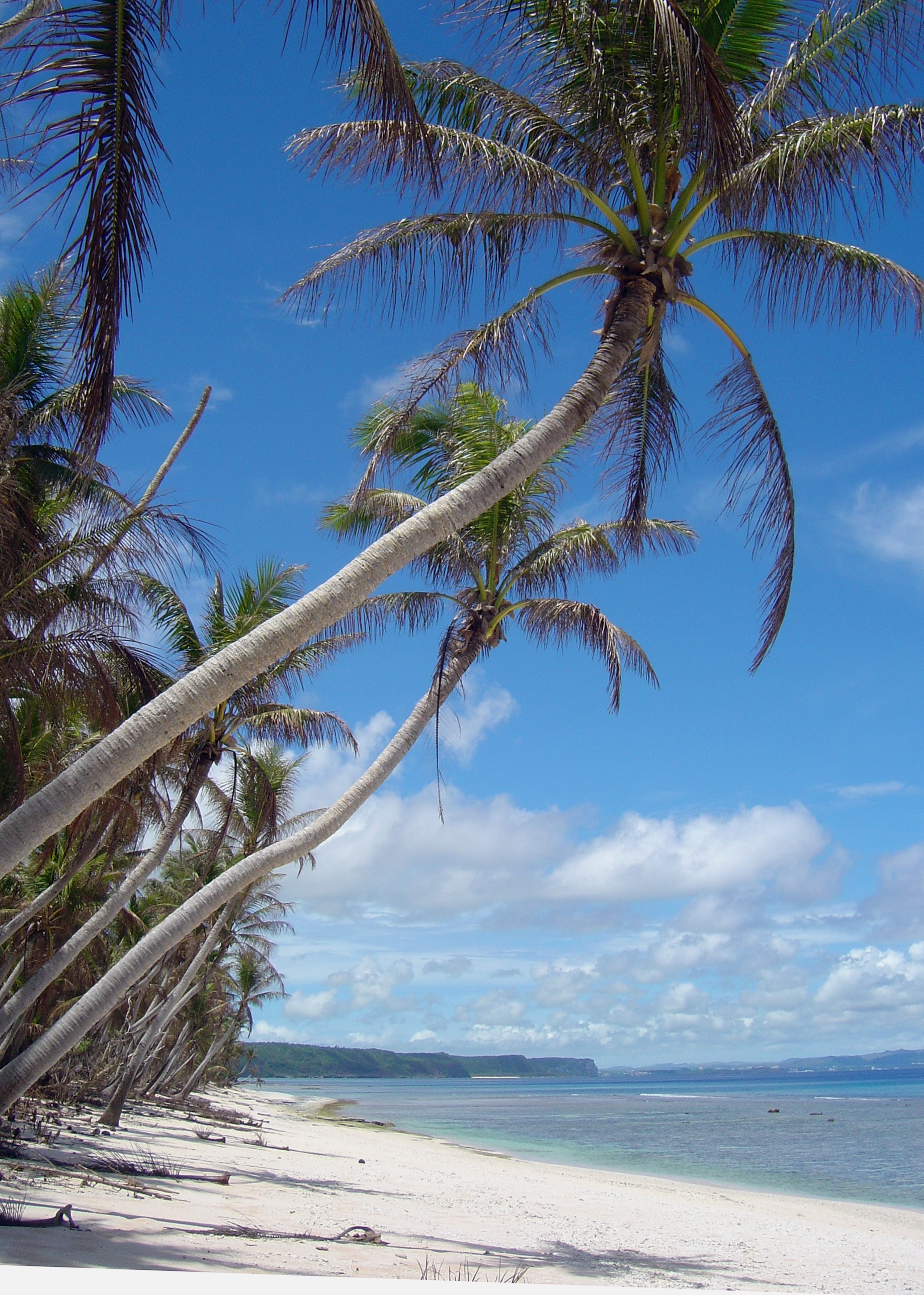
Beach in northwest Guam

- Falcona Beach (Dededo)
- Uruno Beach (Dededo)

== See also ==
- List of beaches in the United States
