= List of census-designated places in Guam =

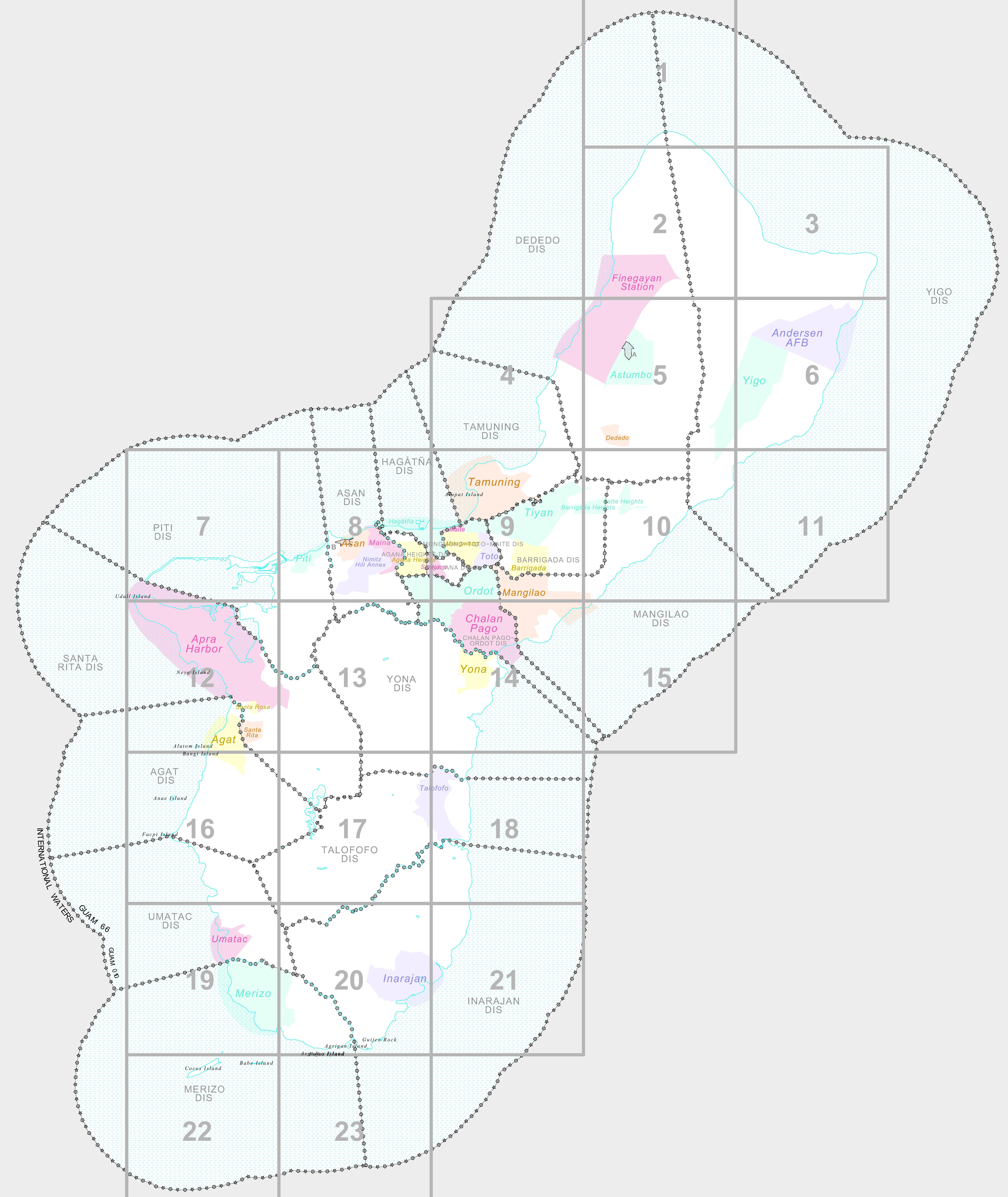
Census 2000 map of Guam

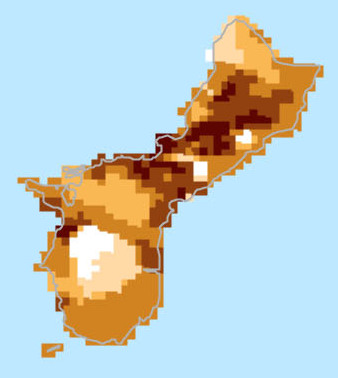
Guam population density map, 2000

This is a list of census-designated places in Guam. Population data is from the 2010 Census.

== Census Designated Places of Guam ==
Name	Population	Village
Adacao	4,184	Tamuning
Afame	758	Sinajana
Agana Heights	3,718	Agana Heights
Agat	3,677	Agat
Anao	1,952	Yigo
Andersen Air Force Base	3,061	Yigo
Apotgan	5,928	Tamuning
Apra Harbor	2,471	Santa Rita
Asan	853	Asan-Maina
Astumbo	3,764	Dededo
Barrigada	4,058	Barrigada
Barrigada Heights	2,435	Barrigada
Chaguian	3,062	Yigo
Chalan Pago	3,578	Chalan Pago-Ordot
Dededo	6,386	Dededo
Finegayan Station	211	Dededo
Hagåtña	1,051	Hagåtña
Harmon Industrial Park	2,056	Tamuning
Inarajan	795	Inarajan
Ipan	901	Talofofo
Liguan	5,735	Dededo
Machanaonao East	3,810	Dededo
Machanaonao West	2,675	Dededo
Machanao	5,930	Dededo
Macheche	3,356	Dededo
Maina	809	Asan-Maina
Maite	707	Mongmong-Toto-Maite
Malojloj	1,224	Inarajan
Mangilao	5,805	Mangilao
Mataguac	5,520	Yigo
Merizo	1,774	Merizo
Mogfog	2,987	Dededo
Mongmong	3,667	Mongmong-Toto-Maite
Naval Hospital	90	Agana Heights
Nimitz Hill	702	Piti
Nimitz Hill Annex	180	Asan-Maina
North Gayinero	3,349	Yigo
Oka	2,142	Tamuning
Ordot	2,244	Chalan Pago-Ordot
Pagat	1,645	Mangilao
Piti	584	Piti
Santa Rita	1,118	Santa Rita
Sinajana	1,829	Sinajana
South Gayinero	3,568	Yigo
Talofofo	2,086	Talofofo
Tamuning	3,794	Tamuning
Toto	2,235	Mongmong-Toto-Maite
Tumon	2,230	Tamuning
Ukudu	806	Dededo
Umatac	548	Umatac
University of Guam	3,496	Mangilao
Upper Tumon	3,566	Tamuning
Windward Hills	2,257	Yona
Wusstig	2,818	Dededo
Yona	3,235	Yona

== See also ==
- Villages of Guam
- List of beaches in Guam
