= Mount Schroeder =

Mountain in Guam

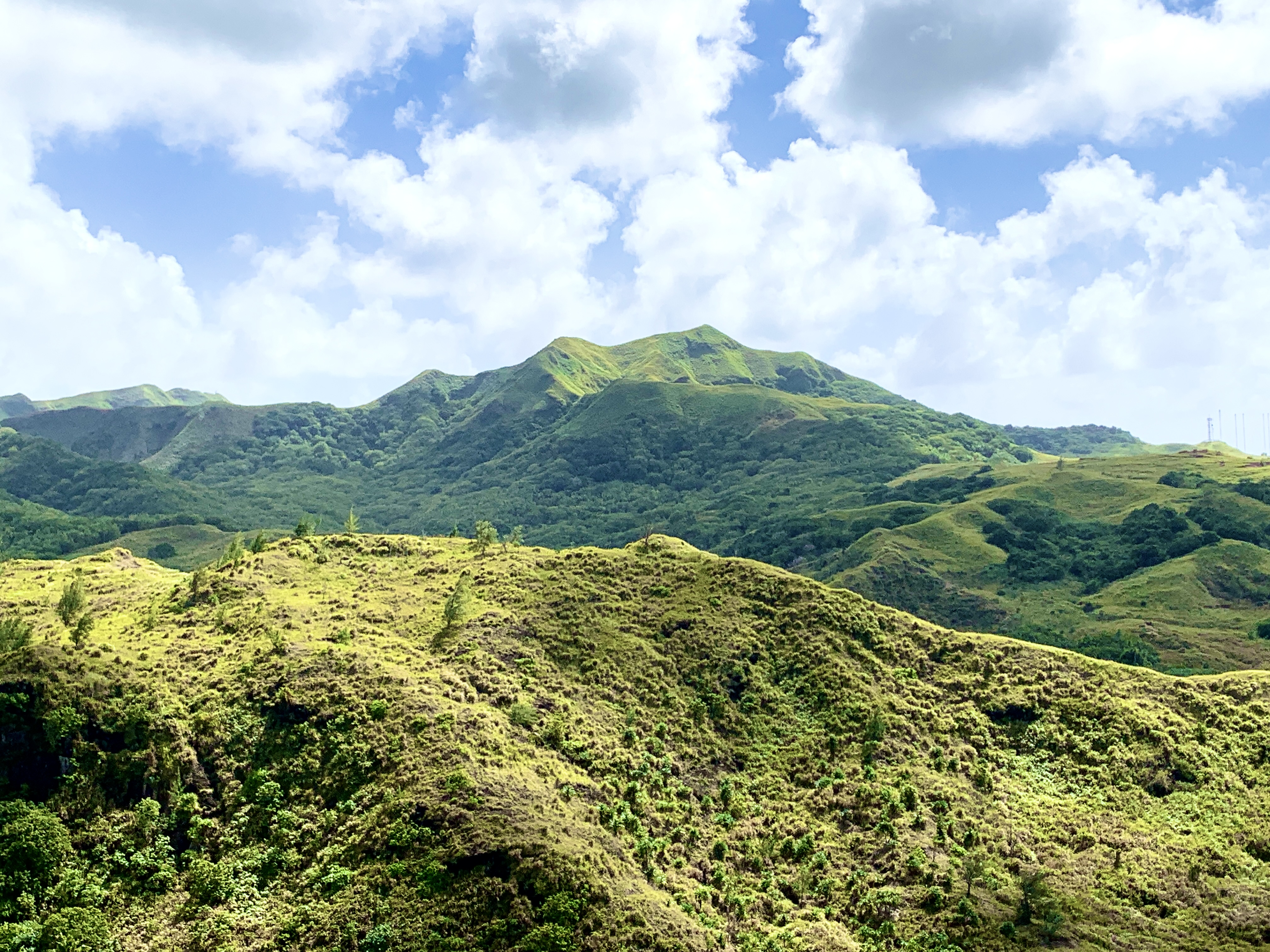

Highest point
- Elevation: 322 m (1,056 ft)
- Coordinates: 13°17′03″N 144°40′45″E

Geography
- Location within Guam
- Location: On the border between the municipalities of Merizo and Umatac, Guam, Micronesia, U.S. territory

Mount Schroeder is a mountain in Guam. It is also known as Punto Christo, or Christ's Point in Spanish. It is located on the border between the municipalities of Merizo and Umatac, in the southern part of Guam, 22 km south of the capital Hagåtña. The summit of Mount Schroeder is 322 meters above sea level. It was named after the admiral Seaton Schroeder an early naval governor of Guam who was appointed in July 1900. Prior to that it was known as Mount Finacresta.

Mount Schroeder is one of two major branches of the southern mountain range, the other being Mount Sasalaguan, whose trail ends in Inarajan. The ridges in this range are composed of volcanic rock with a bit of limestone on top of it.

At the summit, southern Agat, Cocos Island and the Geus River Valley can be seen without obstruction. The hike to the summit is short, but steep and gloves and long sleeves are highly recommended due to the sword grass. The trailhead is on Trans World Radio property.
