= List of lakes of Guam =

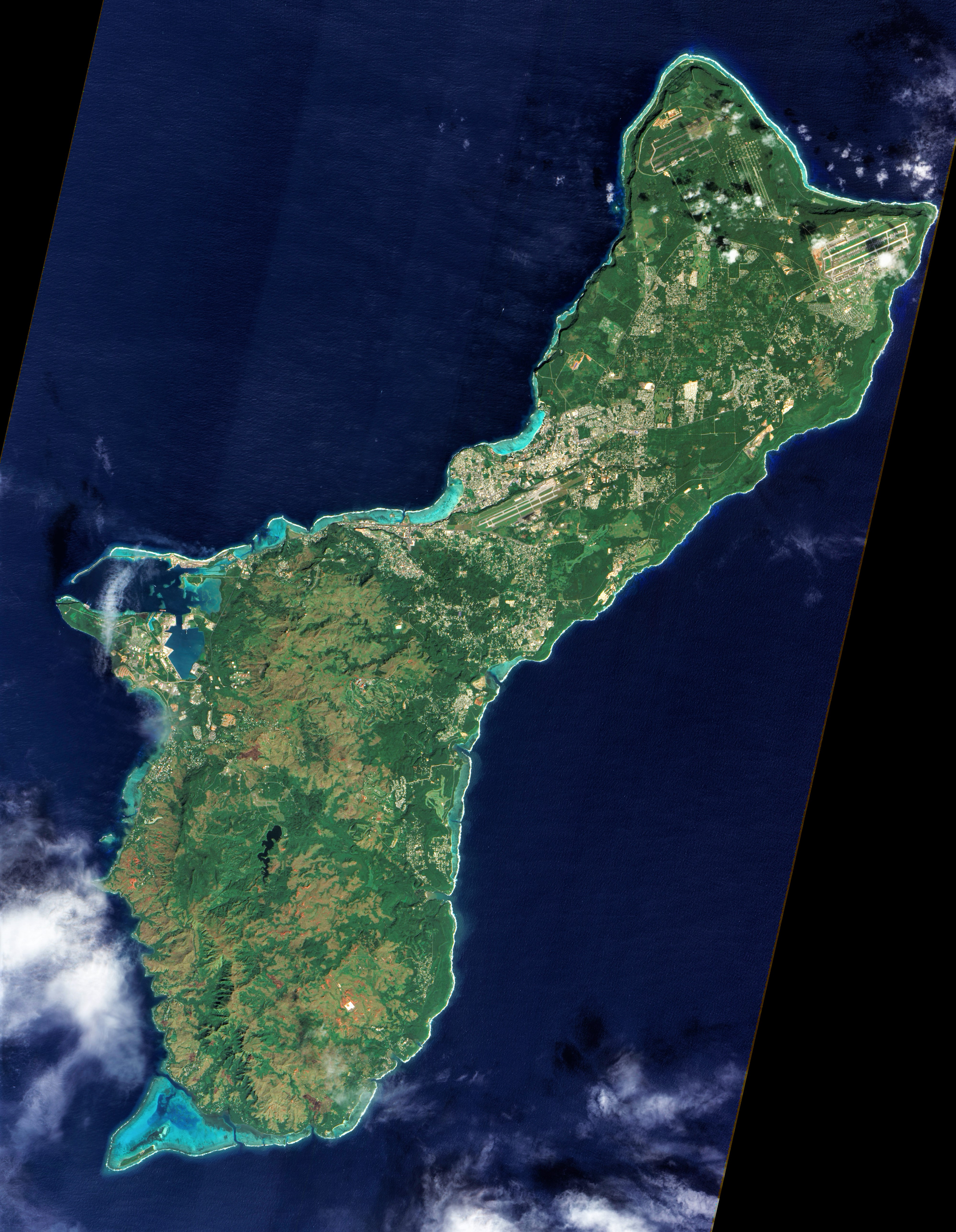
Photo of Guam from space

Fena Lake

Guam is made up of islands in the Pacific Ocean just south of the Mariana Islands: it is a territory of the United States. Cocos Island is an island 1 mile (1.6 km) off the southern tip of the United States territory of Guam and is considered part of Guam. Other islands in the Guam island chain are: Fofos, Cabras, As-Gadao and Agrigan. Fresh water in Guam is found in many marshy areas or ponds, and one large Fena Lake reservoir.

== Lakes and reservoirs ==
- Cocos Lagoon
- Fena Reservoir

== Ponds, swamps and marshes ==
- Agana Swamp
- Assupian Pond
- Lost Pond
- LeoPalace Pond 52M
- Route 4 Marsh

== See also ==
- List of rivers of Guam
