= Afame, Guam =

Afame
- Village
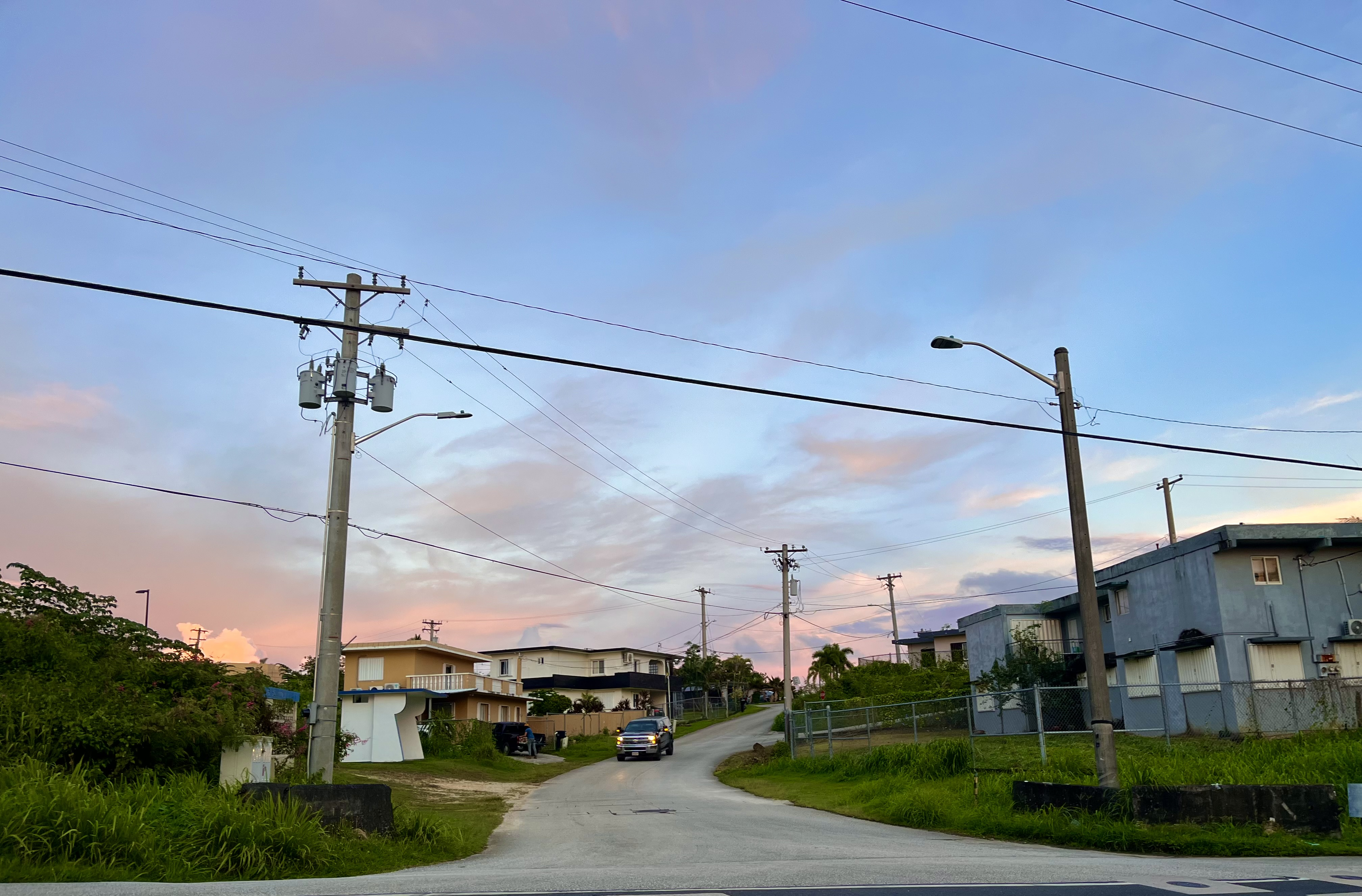

- Location within Guam
- Coordinates: 13°27′21″N 144°45′31″E
- Country: United States
- Territory: Guam

Afame, also Afami, is a census-designated place in central Guam. It is located in the village of Sinajana, just south of Hagåtña.
