= Paulino Outdoor Oven =

- U.S. National Register of Historic Places
- Location within Guam
- Location: Agfayan Point, south side of Bear Rock Lane, Inarajan, Guam
- Coordinates: 13°15′59″N 144°44′24″E
- Area: less than one acre
- NRHP reference No.: 10000971
- Added to NRHP: December 3, 2010

The Paulino Outdoor Oven is a 20th-century version of a traditional hotnu, or outside oven, on the island of Guam. This oven is located on Paulino family land of Bear Rock Lane on Agfayan Point, a peninsula on the south side of Agfayan Bay in the village of Inarajan. It was built in 1947 for the Paulinos by Jesus Menu Cristostomo out of modern materials, following a traditional form that has been in use on Guam since these ovens were introduced by the Spanish in the 17th century. It is a barrel-shaped structure about 1.85 metres (6.1 ft) long, 1.68 metres (5.5 ft) wide, and 0.8 metres (2.6 ft) high. The base of the structure is coral stone mixed with mortar. The interior of the vault is made out of heat-resistant bricks, while the exterior is finished in alternating layers of red tile and mortar. The oven was used by the Paulino family to prepare baked goods such as dinner rolls and wedding cakes, and to roast pigs. When recorded in 2010, it was in deteriorating condition.

The oven was listed on the National Register of Historic Places in 2010.

== See also ==
- Baza Outdoor Oven
- Quan Outdoor Oven
- Won Pat Outdoor Oven
- National Register of Historic Places listings in Guam
