= Malojloj, Guam =

- Census designated place
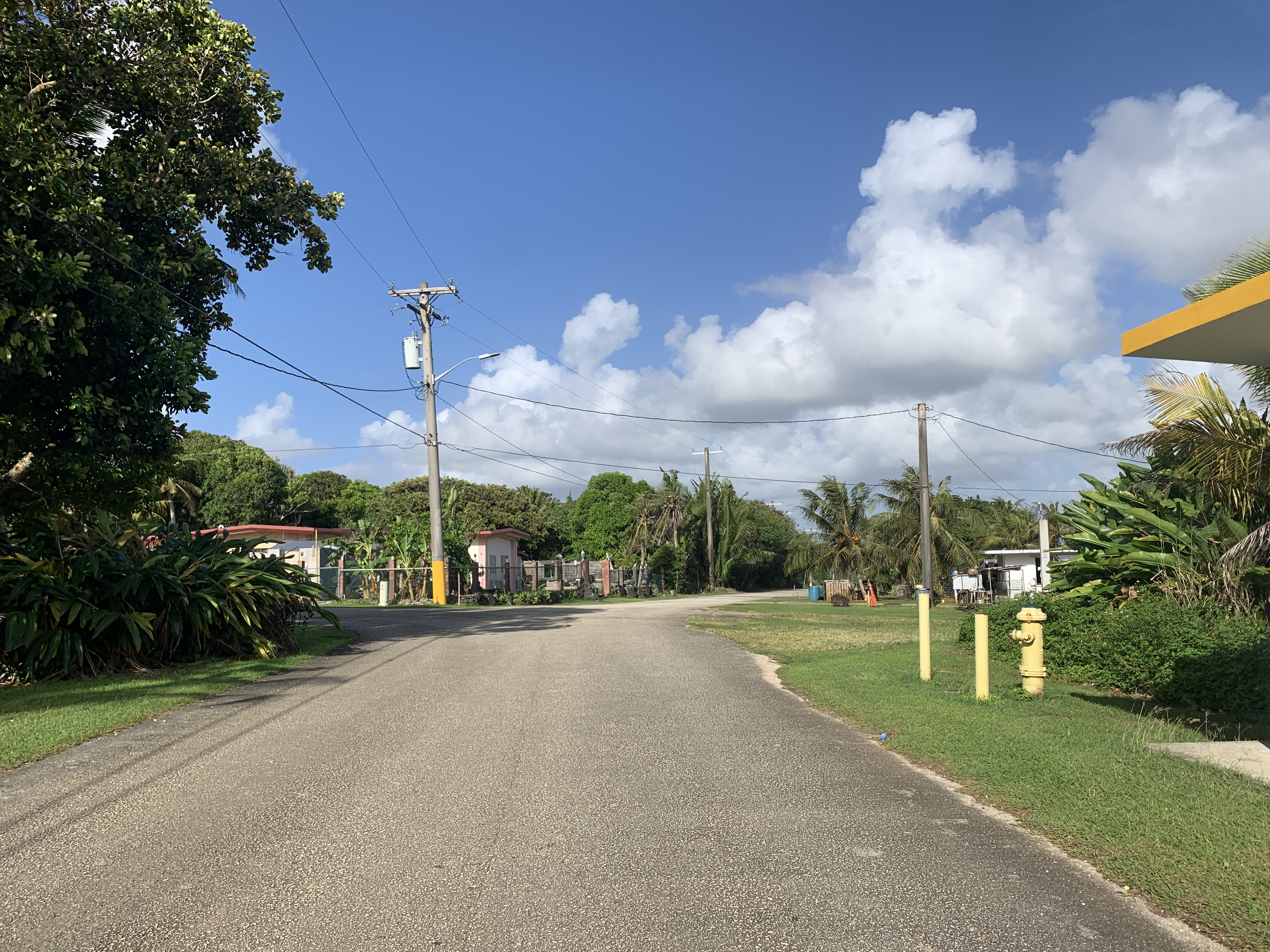
- Malojloj
- Interactive map of Malojloj, Guam
- Country: United States
- Territory: Guam
- Village: Inarajan
- Time zone: UTC+10 (ChST)

Malojloj is a census-designated place located within the larger village of Inarajan, in the United States overseas territory of Guam. It is located about 3.9 km (2.4 mi) from Inarjan and about 18.9 km (11.7 mi) from Hagatna, the capital of Guam. The Malojloj waterfalls is located in the vicinity of the settlement.

== Geography ==
Malojloj is a census-designated place in the United States overseas territory of Guam. It is part of the larger village of Inarajan, which had a population of 3,673 individuals as of 2020. It is located about 3.9 km (2.4 mi) from Inarjan and about 18.9 km (11.7 mi) from Hagatna, the capita of Guam. It is located on Route 4, and got its first permanent bus service in 2015. It has an average elevation of 103 m (338 ft), and has a tropical rainforest climate as per the Köppen climate classification.

=== Malojloj waterfalls ===
The Malojloj (or Malokloj) waterfalls is located off the route 4 in the vicinity of the settlement. It is part of a group of waterfalls, and can be reached by a small trek on foot within the jungles. It is located in a valley surrounded by grassy hillocks covered by bamboo trees. The waterfall forms smaller pools of water before the river proceeds downstream. Closer to the falls is the Malojloj solar-panel farm, which is an important power source to the region.

== Culture and ecology ==
San Isidro fiesta is an annual festival and feast celebrated in the settlement in May. San Isidro or Isidore was a Spanish agricultural worker who is revered as the patron saint of farmers by the Catholics. A chemical disposal site was operated by the Government of the United States near the settlement. The University of Guam is involved in the protection and replenishment of the ecology of the region.

== See also ==
- List of census-designated places in Guam
