= Won Pat Outdoor Oven =

- U.S. National Register of Historic Places
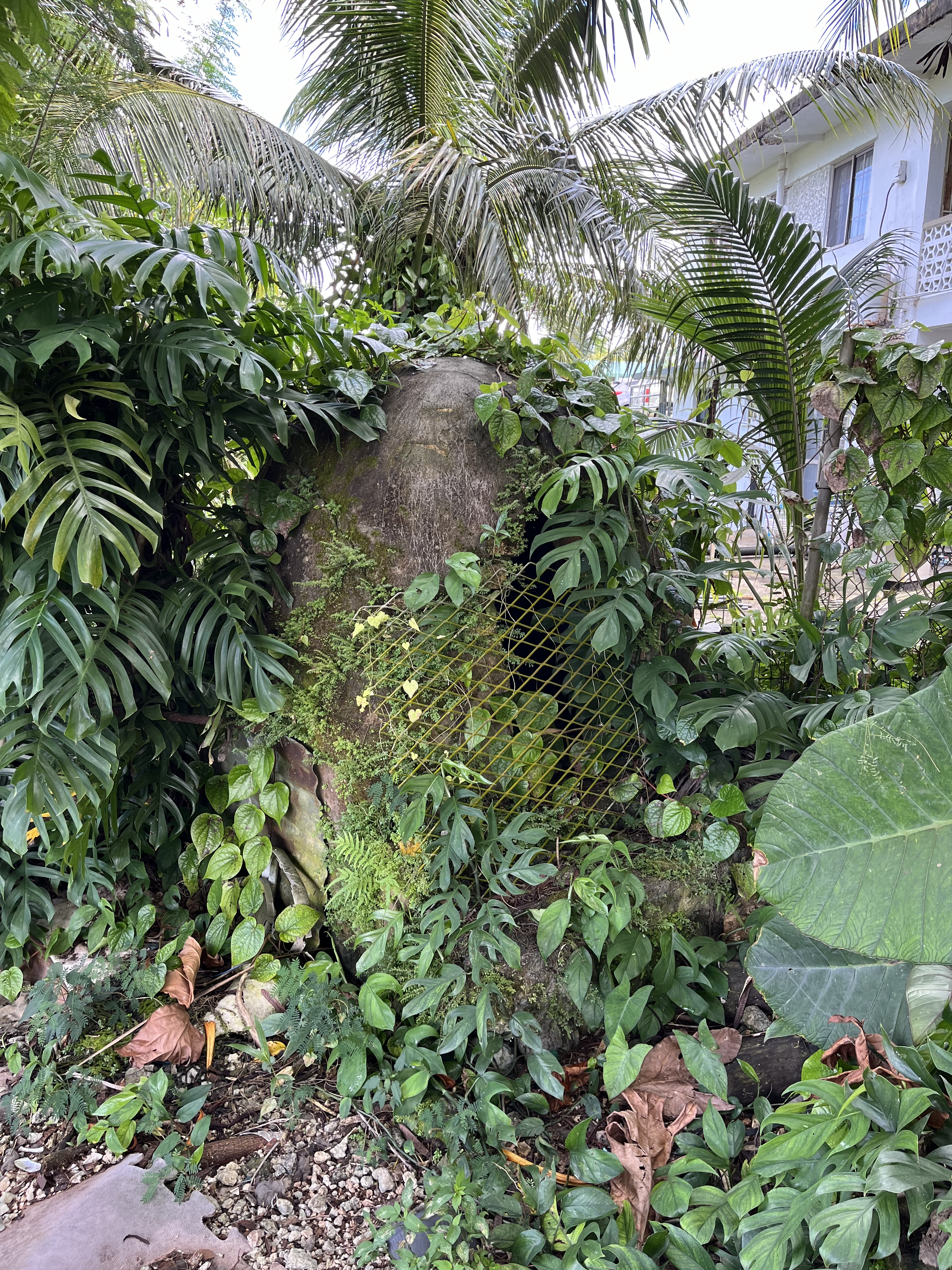

- Location within Guam
- Location: Between 114 and 126 Mansanita Ct, Sinajana, Guam
- Coordinates: 13°27′43″N 144°45′15″E
- Area: less than one acre
- NRHP reference No.: 10000969
- Added to NRHP: December 3, 2010

The Won Pat Outdoor Oven is a 20th-century version of a traditional hotnu, or outside oven, on the island of Guam. It is located on a vacant lot off Mansanita Court in Sinajana. Although built out of modern materials, it follows a traditional form that has been in use on Guam since these ovens were introduced by the Spanish in the 17th century. It is a barrel-shaped structure about 1.6 metres (5.2 ft) long, 1.3 metres (4.3 ft) wide, rising to a height of 0.55 metres (1.8 ft). The base of the structure is built of rough limestone and mortar. The interior of the vault is made out of heat-resistant bricks, while the exterior is finished in concrete. When recorded in 2010, its main opening was damaged.

The oven was listed on the National Register of Historic Places in 2010.

== See also ==
- Baza Outdoor Oven
- Paulino Outdoor Oven
- Quan Outdoor Oven
- National Register of Historic Places listings in Guam
