= Ben Ada =

Guamanian politician

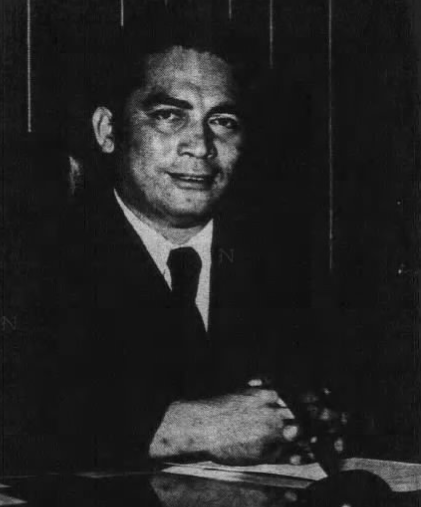
- Ada in 1972

Member of the Guam Legislature
- In office 1971–1978

Personal details
- Born: Vicente Diaz Ada; January 24, 1932 Hagåtña, Guam, U.S.
- Died: August 28, 2016 (aged 84) Sinajana, Guam, U.S.
- Party: Republican
- Spouse: Teresita Gutierrez Borja
- Children: 10; including Vicente Ada
- Relatives: Juan M. Ada (grandfather)

Vicente Diaz Ada (January 24, 1932 – August 28, 2016) was a Guamanian politician. A member of the Republican Party, he served in the Guam Legislature from 1971 to 1978.

== Life and career ==
Ada was born in Hagåtña, Guam, the son of Vicente Cepada Ada and Dolores de Leon Guerrero Diaz. He was the grandson of Juan M. Ada, a district judge of the Saipan Territorial District Court. He served in the United States Air Force during the Korean War, which after his discharge, he worked as a businessman.

Ada served in the Guam Legislature from 1971 to 1978.

== Death ==
Ada died on August 28, 2016, in Sinajana, Guam, at the age of 84.
