= Cocos Lagoon =

Lake in Washington County, Wisconsin

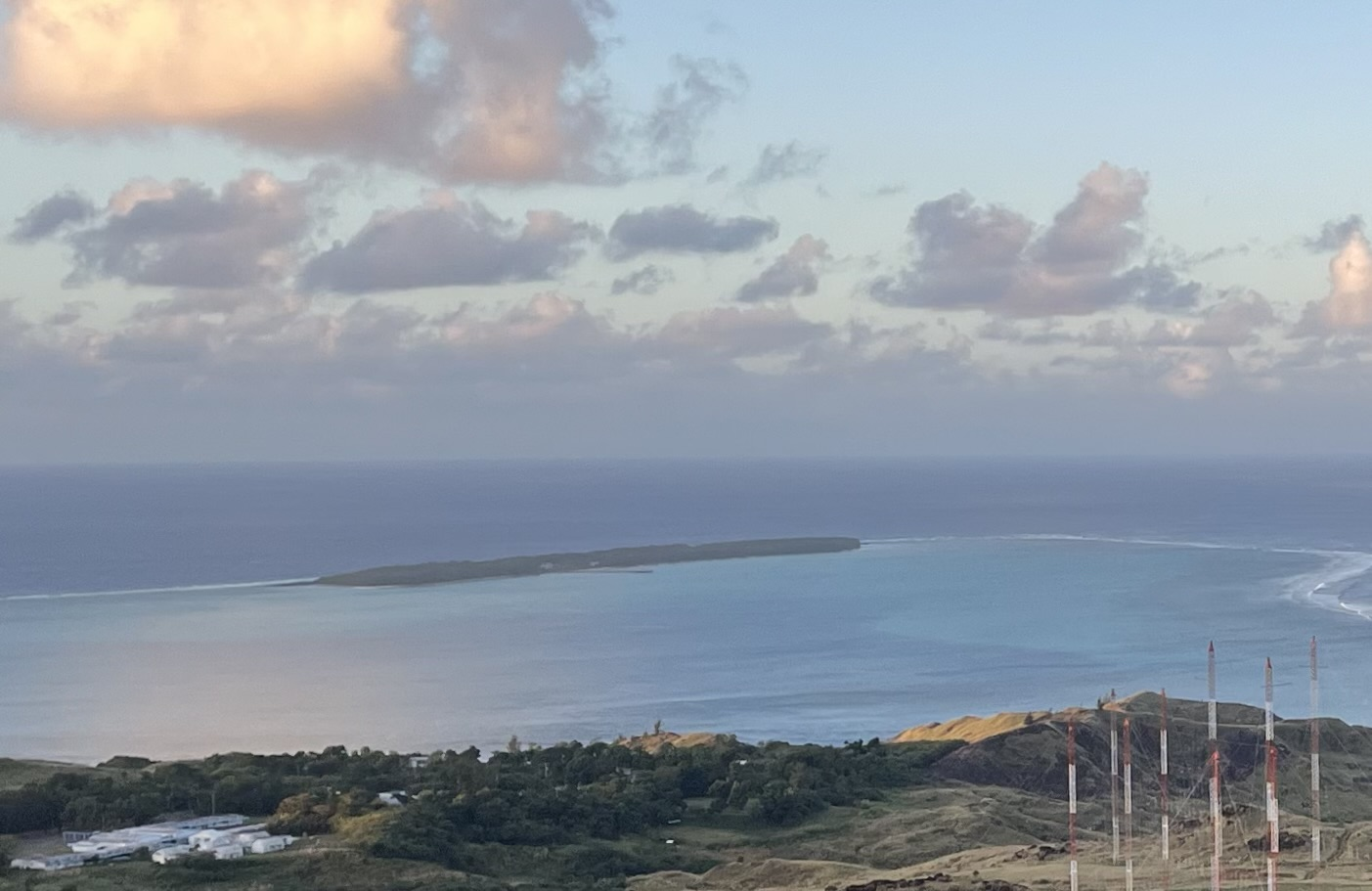
- Cocos Lagoon and Cocos Island as seen from Mount Schroeder

- Location within Guam

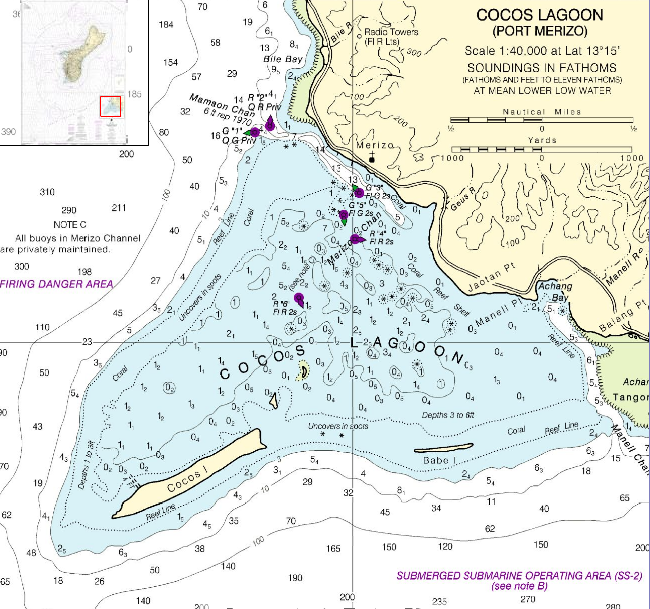
- Nautical chart of Cocos Lagoon
- Location: Cocos, Guam
- Coordinates: 13.252°N 144.662°E
- Type: Natural
- Max. length: 3.5 km (2.2 mi)
- Max. width: 5.5 km (3.4 mi)
- Surface area: 10 km^{2} (3.9 sq mi)

Cocos Lagoon appears as a small incomplete coral atoll attached to the south-western coast of Guam near the area of the village of Malesso'. It stretches about 5.5 km (3.4 mi) east-west and 3.5 km (2.2 mi) north-south, covering an area of more than 10 km^{2} (3.9 sq mi).

Cocos Island and Babe Island sit atop the southern portion of the Merizo Barrier Reef and separate Cocos Lagoon from the open ocean in the south. In the east, Cocos Lagoon is separated from Achang Reef by narrow Manell Channel that leads to Achang Bay. In the north-west, Mamaon Channel separates Cocos Lagoon from the main island of Guam and allows boat access to Merizo. Southeastward of the channel, down to Achang Bay, there is no separation to the main island of Guam. Along the west side, the barrier reef uncovers in spots but has no islands.

== See also ==
- Fofos
- List of rivers of Guam
- List of lakes in Guam

== Bibliography ==
- The Island of Guam By Leonard Martin Cox
- Bendure, G. & Friary, N. (1988) Micronesia:A travel survival kit. South Yarra, VIC: Lonely Planet.
