= Quan Outdoor Oven =

- U.S. National Register of Historic Places
- Location within Guam
- Location: North side, J.C. Santos St. at J.C. Tuncap St., Piti, Guam
- Coordinates: 13°27′50″N 144°41′36″E
- Area: less than one acre
- NRHP reference No.: 10000970
- Added to NRHP: December 3, 2010

The Quan Outdoor Oven is a 20th-century version of a traditional hotnu, or outside oven, on the island of Guam.

This oven is located on Quan family land on J. C. Santos Road, south of Santos Memorial Park in Piti. Although built out of modern materials, it follows a traditional form in use on Guam since such ovens were introduced by the Spanish in the 17th century.

It is a barrel-shaped structure about 2 metres (6.6 ft) long, 1.68 metres (5.5 ft) wide, and 1.37 metres (4.5 ft) wide, rising to a height of 0.64 metres (2.1 ft). The base of the structure is either poured concrete or concrete blocks. The interior of the vault is made out of heat-resistant brick, while the exterior is finished in concrete. When recorded in 2010, its main opening was damaged.

The oven was listed on the National Register of Historic Places in 2010.

== See also ==
- Baza Outdoor Oven
- Paulino Outdoor Oven
- Won Pat Outdoor Oven
- National Register of Historic Places listings in Guam
