= Adacao, Guam =

Adacao
- Village
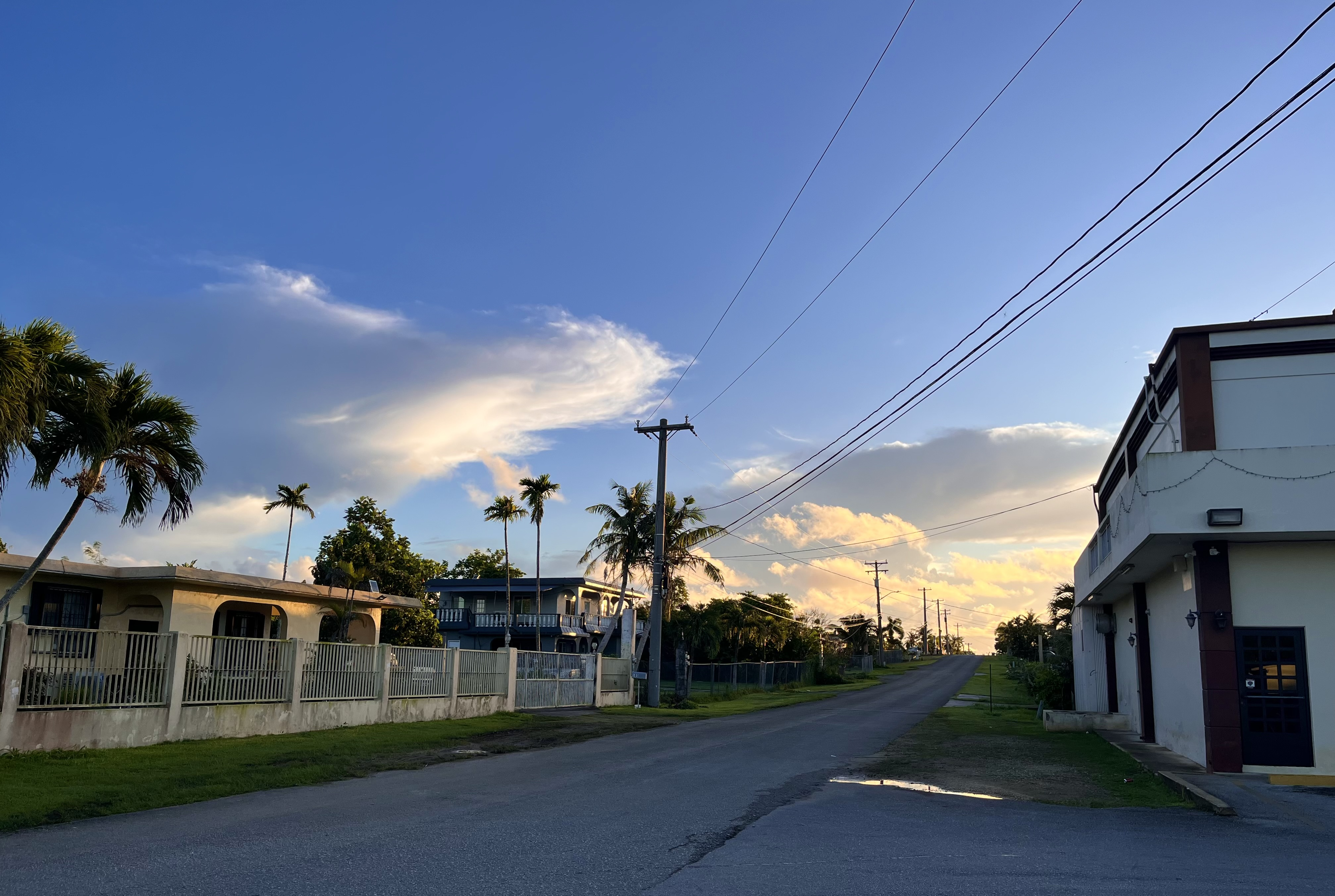

- Location within Guam
- Coordinates: 13°29′22″N 144°51′11″E
- Country: United States
- Territory: Guam

Adacao is a settlement in the north-east of Guam. It is located on the east coast, 11 miles east of Hagåtña, in the village of Mangilao.
