= Baza Outdoor Oven =

- U.S. National Register of Historic Places
- Location within Guam
- Location: West end of Beatrice Baza Rd., Yona, Guam
- Coordinates: 13°24′13″N 144°46′4″E
- Area: less than one acre
- NRHP reference No.: 10000972
- Added to NRHP: December 3, 2010

The Baza Outdoor Oven is a 20th-century version of a traditional hotnu, or outside oven, on the island of Guam. This oven is located at the end of Beatrice Baza Drive in the village of Yona. It was built in 1952 out of brick and concrete, but is based on traditional forms that have been in use on Guam since they were introduced by the Spanish in the 17th century. It is a barrel-shaped structure about 2 metres (6.6 ft) long, 1.5 metres (4.9 ft) wide, and 1.67 metres (5.5 ft) high. The base of the structure is poured concrete about 0.6 metres (2.0 ft) high, with the vaulted portion about 1 metre (3.3 ft) high. The interior of the vault is made out of heat-resistant bricks, while the exterior is finished in cement. The oven was used by heating it until the bricks were white, after which the burning materials were removed, the food to be cooked was added, and the main door was closed. This oven is large enough to roast four pigs.

The oven was listed on the National Register of Historic Places in 2010.

== See also ==
- Paulino Outdoor Oven
- Quan Outdoor Oven
- Won Pat Outdoor Oven
- National Register of Historic Places listings in Guam
