= Southern High School (Guam) =

High school in Guam

Location
- #1 Jose Perez Leon Guerrero Drive; Santa Rita, Guam 96915; 13°23′50.29″N 144°40′43.52″E

Information
- Type: Public school
- Motto: "Home of the Dolphins"
- School district: Southern Guam
- Principal: Michael Meno
- Staff: 23
- Faculty: 94
- Grades: 9–12
- Enrollment: 1,577 (SY 2012-2013)
- Colors: Black, teal, and white
- Mascot: Dolphins
- Accreditation: Western Association of Schools and Colleges

Southern High School is a public secondary school located at 1 Jose Perez Leon Guerrero Drive in the village of Santa Rita, in the United States territory of Guam. The school, a part of the Guam Public School System, opened in 1997 and serves grades 9 through 12. Southern High serves the villages of Santa Rita, Agat, Asan-Maina, Inarajan, Merizo, Piti, Talofofo, Umatac, and Yona.

== History ==
In January 2023, the school received a "D" grade for safety and public health from the Guam Department of Public Health due to various infractions, including inaccessible drinking fountains.

== Student body ==
During the 1999–2000 school year, the school had 1,700 students: 83% Chamorro, 9% Filipino, 3% White American, 2% other Pacific Islanders, and 1% Asian.

== Athletics ==
Students may participate in interscholastic athletics if they are under the age of 19 on September 1 of the applicable school year.

School athletics include: coeducational: American football, Cheerleading, Paddling, Rugby, and Wrestling; male only: Baseball; and female only: Softball. The school has a varsity and a junior varsity team each for volleyball and basketball.

== Notable alumni ==
- John Hattig - Guam's first Major League Baseball player; played for the Toronto Blue Jays
- Walt Nauta - valet to former president Donald Trump
- Michael San Nicolas - delegate to the U.S. House of Representatives (2019–23)
