= Merizo Bell Tower =

- U.S. National Register of Historic Places
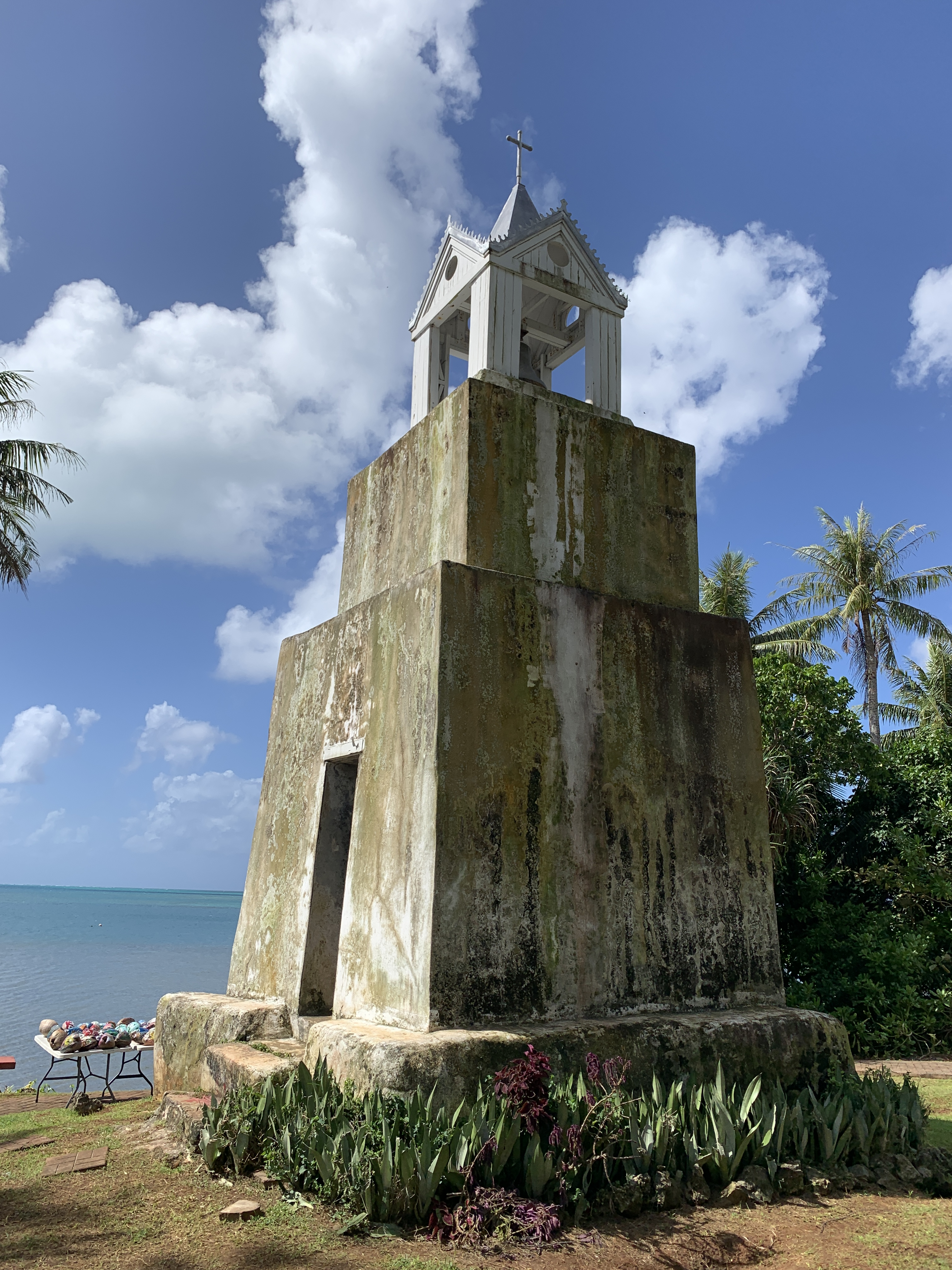

- Location within Guam
- Location: Off Guam Highway 4, Merizo, Guam
- Coordinates: 13°15′57″N 144°40′5″E
- Area: 0.5 acres (0.20 ha)
- Built: 1914 or 1919
- NRHP reference No.: 75002152
- Added to NRHP: May 29, 1975

The Merizo Bell Tower, on Guam Highway 4 in Merizo, Guam, is a bell tower that was built in 1914 or 1919. It was listed on the U.S. National Register of Historic Places in 1975.

The tower is 7.3 metres (24 ft) tall and sits on a 4 metres (13 ft) square base; it is built of a "heavy masonry called manposteria consisting of stone with mortar covered with cement plaster". The tower is significant for association with a Catholic priest, Father Cristobal de Canals, who built the bell tower and a church and took many steps to promote agriculture and raise the standard of living in the village of Merizo. Architecturally, the tower symbolizes transition between colonial Spanish architecture and more modern methods; a major element of its design is its massing.

== See also ==
- National Register of Historic Places listings in Guam
