= As-Gadao =

Island in the United States of America

Coordinates: 13°14′35″N 144°42′13″E

As-Gadao is a small island off the southern coast of the island of Guam. It is connected to the mainland by the Merizo Barrier Reef.
