= John Hattig =

American baseball player (born 1980)

- Third baseman / First baseman
- Born: February 27, 1980 (age 45); Tamuning, Guam
- Batted: Switch Threw: Right

MLB debut
- August 19, 2006, for the Toronto Blue Jays

Last MLB appearance
- October 1, 2006, for the Toronto Blue Jays

MLB statistics
- Batting average: .333
- Home runs: 0
- Runs batted in: 3
- Stats at Baseball Reference

Teams
- Toronto Blue Jays (2006)

John Duane Hattig (born February 27, 1980) is an American former professional baseball third baseman and first baseman who appeared in 13 games for the Toronto Blue Jays during the 2006 season. In the minor leagues, Hattig played in 836 games over 10 seasons, and posted a career .286 batting average.

Hattig was the first player born in Guam to appear in the Major Leagues. As of the 2025 season, only one other player born in Guam has appeared in a game: Sean Reid-Foley.

== Playing career ==
Hatting attended Southern High School in Santa Rita, Guam. Hattig attracted the attention of scouts on the recommendation of his uncle, Keith Hattig, who had played in the California Angels farm system. He was selected by the Boston Red Sox in the 25th round of the 1998 Major League Baseball draft.

He became the first player from Guam to play in Major League Baseball on August 19, 2006, in a game against the Baltimore Orioles. He recorded his first major league hit on September 1 against the Boston Red Sox (who had traded him to Toronto in 2004), and his first double and RBI (he recorded three of them in this game) on September 13 against the Seattle Mariners. A free agent after the 2007 season, Hattig signed a minor league contract with the New York Mets, but was released before playing a game with them.

He signed with the Reno Silver Sox of the Golden Baseball League on May 12, 2008.

== Personal life ==
Hattig was arrested in Tamuning, Guam in July 2021 and charged with four felonies, namely two counts of possession of a Schedule II controlled substance, possession of a firearm without a firearms identification card and possession of a concealed firearm as a third-degree felony. At the time, he was working for the government of Guam.
