= Mongmong-Toto-Maite, Guam =

Coordinates: 13°28′19″N 144°46′13″E

Mongmong-Toto-Maite Mong Mong-Totu-Maiti
- Village
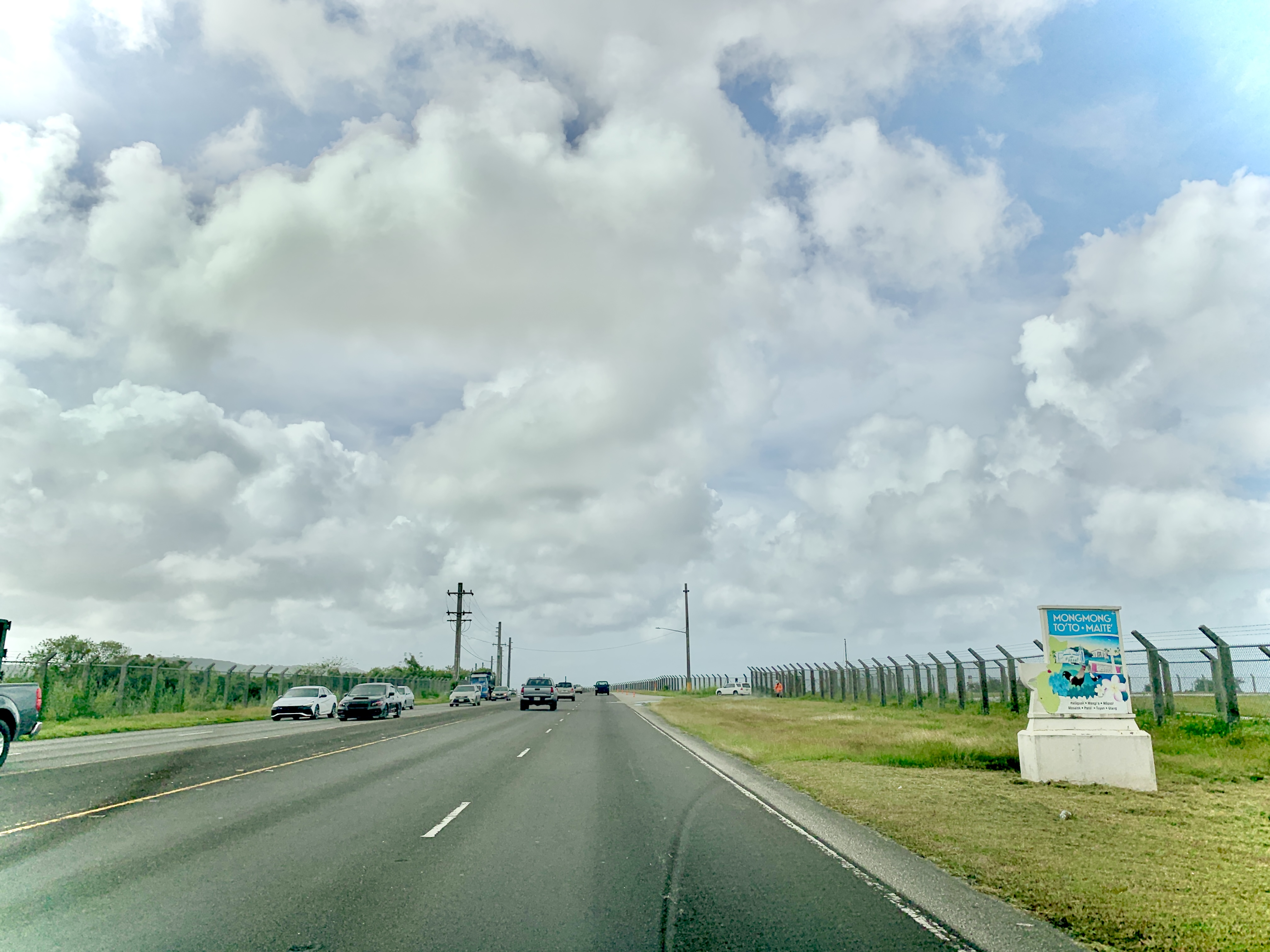

- Location of Mongmong-Toto-Maite within the Territory of Guam.
- Country: United States
- Territory: Guam

Government
  - Mayor: Rudy A. Paco (D)

Population (2020)
  - Total: 6,380
- Time zone: UTC+10 (ChST)

Historical population
Census	Pop.	Note	%±
1960	3,015		—
1970	6,057		100.9%
1980	5,245		−13.4%
1990	5,845		11.4%
2000	5,845		0.0%
2010	6,825		16.8%
2020	6,380		−6.5%

Mongmong-Toto-Maite (Chamorro: Mong Mong-Totu-Maiti) is a municipality in the United States territory of Guam composed of three separate villages east of Hagåtña that experienced development after the Second World War.

Mongmong is adjacent to the Hagåtña Swamp; Toto is situated to the north-east near Barrigada; Maite is located on the cliffs overlooking Agana Bay and the Philippine Sea. The village's population has decreased since the island's 2010 census.

== Demographics ==
The U.S. Census Bureau has multiple census-designated places: Maite, Mongmong, and Toto.

== Education ==
Guam Public School System serves the island. George Washington High School in Mangilao serves the village.

In regards to the Department of Defense Education Activity (DoDEA), this village is in the school transportation zone for Andersen Elementary and Andersen Middle School, while Guam High School is the island's sole DoDEA high school.

== Populated places ==
- Apurguan

== Government ==
Commissioner of Mongmong-Toto-Maite
Name	Term begin	Term end
Manuel Q. San Miguel	1944	1945
Jose C. Duenas	1945	1952
Jesus M. Camacho	1952	1961
Jose C. Farfan	1961	January 1, 1973

Mayor of Mongmong-Toto-Maite
Name	Party	Term begin	Term end
Jose E. Santos	Republican	January 1, 1973	January 3, 1977
Norberto F. Ungacta	Democratic	January 3, 1977	January 5, 1981
Rodney J. Villagomez	Republican	January 5, 1981	January 7, 1985
Jesus C. Bamba	Democratic	January 7, 1985	January 2, 1989
Antonio D. Materne	Republican	January 2, 1989	January 6, 1997
Andrew C. Villagomez	Republican	January 6, 1997	January 2, 2017
Rudy A. Paco	Democratic	January 2, 2017	present

== See also ==
- Villages of Guam
