= Fofos =

Island off the southern coast of Guam

- Interactive map of Fofos

Geography
- Location: Pacific Ocean
- Coordinates: 13.2442°N 144.7084°E

Fofos is a small island off the southern coast of the island of Guam. It is connected to the mainland by the Merizo Barrier Reef.

== See also ==
- Cocos Lagoon
- List of rivers of Guam

== Bibliography ==
- The Island of Guam By Leonard Martin Cox
