= Malesso, Guam =

Coordinates: 13°15′48″N 144°40′11″E

Malesso'
- Village
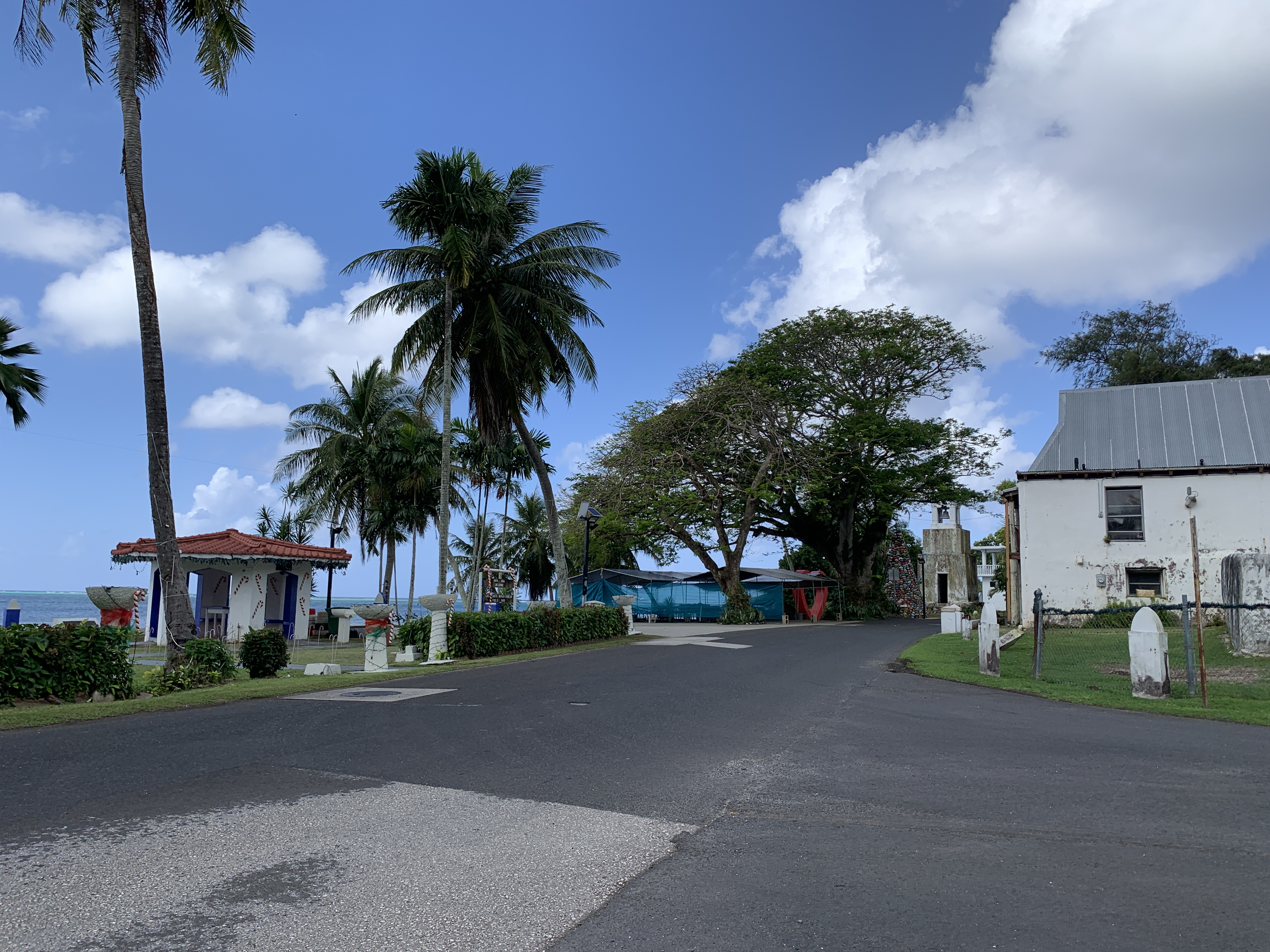

- Location of Malesso' within the Territory of Guam.
- Country: United States
- Territory: Guam

Government
  - Mayor: Franklin J. Champaco (R)

Population (2020)
  - Total: 1,604
- Time zone: UTC+10 (ChST)

Malesso', formerly known as Merizo, is the southernmost village in the United States territory of Guam. Cocos Island (Chamorro: Islan Dåno) is a part of the municipality. The village's population has decreased since the island's 2010 census.

Malesso' is the closest populated place in the United States to the equator. On August 18, 2021, the municipality place name was officially changed from Merizo to Malesso'.

== History ==
Historical population
Census	Pop.	Note	%±
1960	1,398		—
1970	1,529		9.4%
1980	1,663		8.8%
1990	1,742		4.8%
2000	2,163		24.2%
2010	1,850		−14.5%
2020	1,604		−13.3%

During the first Spanish missionary efforts on Guam, Malesso' was the site of resistance encouraged by Choco, a Chinese resident of the village. The parish of Malesso' was the second established by the Spanish on Guam. A large population of Chamorros from the Mariana Islands were relocated to the village during Spanish rule.

The village covers an area of 6 square miles (16 km^{2}) and is located on the shore below the volcanic hills of southern Guam. Places of interest for visitors include Merizo Bell Tower, Malesso' Kombento and Merizo Pier where ferries can be taken to Cocos Island (Guam) Resort. Several popular dive sites are located off the Malesso' coast.

In August 2021, Gov. Lou Leon Guerrero signed a bill officially changing the name of the village from Merizo to Malesso'.

=== Contamination of lagoon ===
Officials from the Guam Environmental Protection Agency, Department of Public Health and Social Services and the Coast Guard announced findings of major polychlorinated biphenyl (PCB) contamination in the Cocos Lagoon on February 20, 2006 and warned people not to eat fish caught there. The contamination is believed to have come from a United States Coast Guard station which operated on Cocos Island from 1944-1963.

== Climate ==
Malesso' has a tropical rainforest climate (Köppen Af) characterised by hot, wet and oppressively humid conditions year-round, although January to March is marginally less wet.

Climate data for Malesso', Guam
Month	Jan	Feb	Mar	Apr	May	Jun	Jul	Aug	Sep	Oct	Nov	Dec	Year
Mean daily maximum °F (°C)	87.0 (30.6)	86.4 (30.2)	86.7 (30.4)	87.1 (30.6)	87.6 (30.9)	87.2 (30.7)	87.7 (30.9)	87.4 (30.8)	87.8 (31.0)	88.3 (31.3)	88.3 (31.3)	87.7 (30.9)	87.4 (30.8)
Mean daily minimum °F (°C)	75.9 (24.4)	76.2 (24.6)	76.4 (24.7)	76.4 (24.7)	76.1 (24.5)	76.0 (24.4)	75.0 (23.9)	74.3 (23.5)	74.7 (23.7)	74.5 (23.6)	75.8 (24.3)	75.3 (24.1)	75.6 (24.2)
Average rainfall inches (mm)	8.6 (220)	8.8 (220)	8.2 (210)	10.9 (280)	11.3 (290)	12.8 (330)	12.4 (310)	15.1 (380)	13.1 (330)	10.7 (270)	11.1 (280)	11.0 (280)	134 (3,400)
Source: Weatherbase

== Demographics ==
The U.S. Census Bureau has the Malesso' census-designated place.

== Education ==
=== Primary and secondary schools ===
==== Public schools ====
Guam Public School System serves the island. Merizo Martyrs Elementary School in Malesso' and Inarajan Middle School in Inarajan serve Malesso'. Southern High School in Santa Rita serves the village.

In regards to the Department of Defense Education Activity (DoDEA), Malesso is in the school attendance zone for McCool Elementary and McCool Middle School, while Guam High School is the island's sole DoDEA high school. No DoDEA school buses go to Malesso.

=== Public libraries ===
Guam Public Library System operates the Malesso' Library at 376 Cruz Avenue.

=== Recreation ===
Water sport crafts can be rented near Merizo Pier. The pier is also a fishing spot.

== List of mayors ==
Commissioner of Malesso'
Name	Term begin	Term end
Francisco C. Chargualaf	1957	1977
Joaquin Q. Acfalle	1977	1979
Ignacio "Buck" S. Cruz	1979	1981
Jose R. Tyquiengco	1981	1985

Mayor of Malesso'
Name	Party	Term begin	Term end
Ignacio "Buck" S. Cruz	Democratic	January 7, 1986	January 1, 2001
Rita A. Tainatongo	Democratic	January 1, 2001	September 2006
Sherry L. Chargualaf	Democratic	September 2006	January 5, 2009
Ernest T. Chargualaf	Republican	January 5, 2009	January 4, 2025
Franklin J. Champaco	Republican	January 4, 2025	present

== See also ==
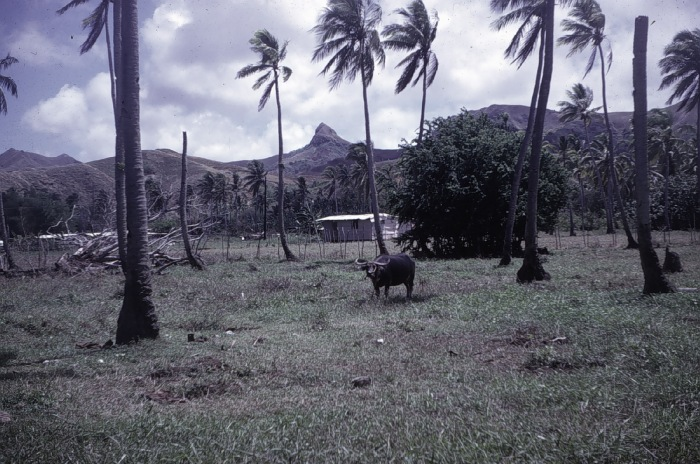
Rural Malesso', Guam

- Villages of Guam
