= Sinajana, Guam =

Coordinates: 13°27′38″N 144°45′07″E

Sinajana Sinahånña
- Village
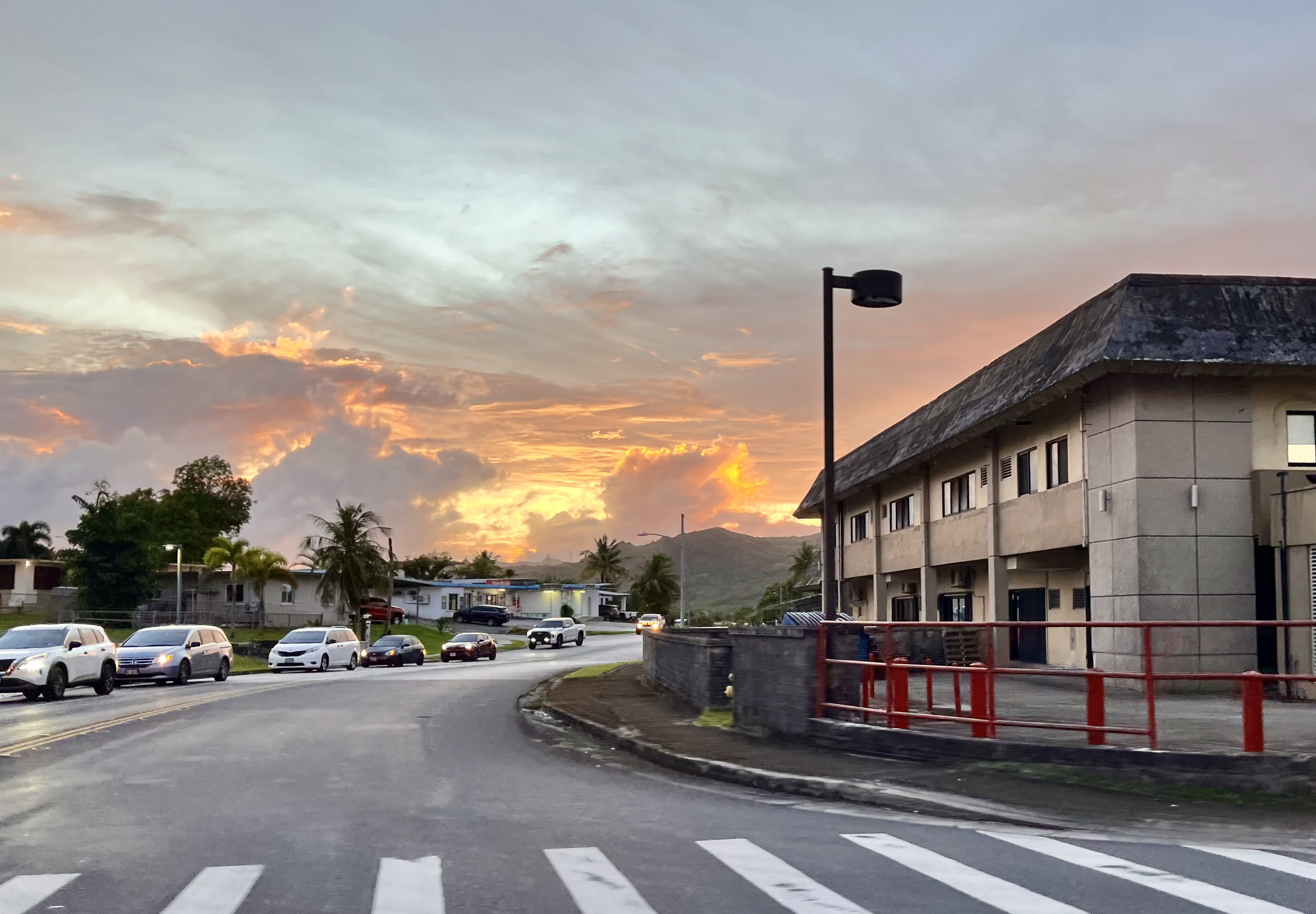

- Location of Sinajana, Guam within the Territory of Guam.
- Country: United States
- Territory: Guam

Government
  - Mayor: Robert R.D.C. Hofmann (D)

Population (2020)
  - Total: 2,611
- Time zone: UTC+10 (ChST)

Sinajana (Chamorro: Sinahånña) is the smallest of the nineteen villages in the United States territory of Guam by area. It is located in the hills south of Hagåtña (formerly Agana). The village's name may have come from the word "china-jan," cookware used to cook wild yams that once grew in the area.

== Urban renewal ==
Sinajana is one of a few villages that was urbanized as a result of a federal urban renewal program. Afami, Agana Springs, and Didigue are a few non-urbanized areas within this same village. There are over 75 homes in Afami, most of which are built below a high cliff, with a few homes high atop a ridge overlooking Hagåtña and Mong-Mong. Agana Springs is located below the cliff line of Sinajana and contains a natural spring with small living creatures like frogs and turtles. Didigue is located at the other end of Agana Springs and is accessible by taking a steep single lane road through Afame. Although called Didigue, it is named Spring Lane.

== Census ==
Historical population
Census	Pop.	Note	%±
1960	3,842		—
1970	3,506		−8.7%
1980	2,485		−29.1%
1990	2,658		7.0%
2000	2,853		7.3%
2010	2,592		−9.1%
2020	2,611		0.7%

As of the 2000 census, the village of Sinajana was reported as having a total population of 2,853. Of that number, 1,433 (50.2%) are male, and 1,420 (49.8%) are female. Of the total population in Sinajana, a little less than 10% were under 5 years old, and 2% were 75 years or older. The median age was found to be 28.7 years. Of the total, 65% were Guamanians, 11% Asian (including Chinese, Filipino, Japanese, Korean, other Asian), 4% Chuukese, and at little less than 4% White. Of the total that are enrolled in school, half were enrolled in elementary school, a little less than a quarter were enrolled in highschool, and a little more than 15% were enrolled in college or graduate school.

Of the total population of 2,853, 1,604 attained an education. The difference of these numbers may be as a result of children that are not of school age qualification. Of the 1,604 people that have attained an education, 35% are high school graduates, 19% earned some level of college with no degree, 15.6% have attained a high school education, 12.5% have earned an undergraduate degree, and 6.5% have earned a graduate or professional degree. Of these numbers, 77.2% attained a high school diploma or higher, and 19% have earned a bachelor's degree or higher.

Of the total population in Sinajana, 193 grandparents reported being responsible for at least one grandchild. With respect to veteran status, 13.5% of the adult civilian population 18 years and older were veterans.

The U.S. Census Bureau counts it under multiple census-designated places: Sinajana, and Afame.

== Education ==
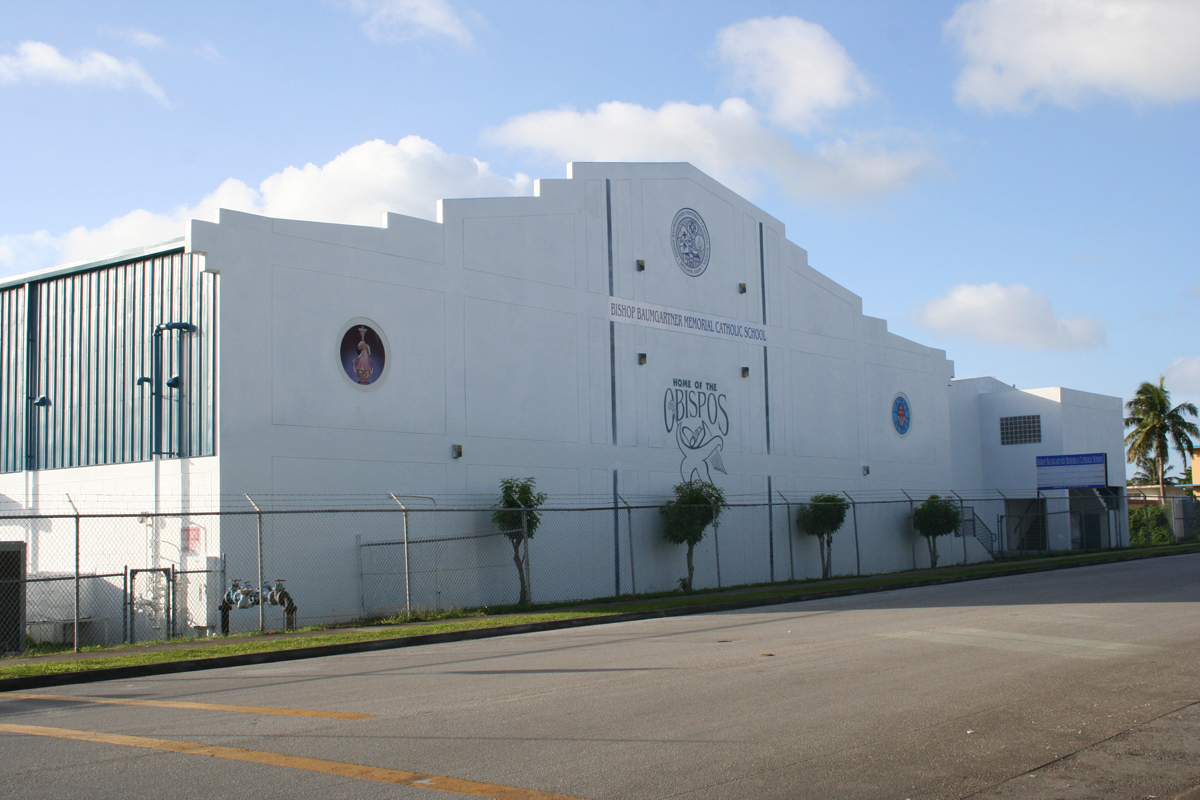
Baumgartner Catholic School, a private school

Guam Public School System serves the island. George Washington High School in Mangilao serves the village.

In regards to the Department of Defense Education Activity (DoDEA), Sinajana is divided between two school transportation zones. People living north of Guam Highway 4 are zoned to Andersen Elementary and Andersen Middle School, while people living south of Guam Highway 4 are zoned to McCool Elementary and McCool Middle School. Guam High School is the island's sole DoDEA high school.

Bishop Baumgartner Memorial Catholic School, a private Catholic school, is in Sinajana.

== Notable residents ==
- Ben Ada - politician
- V. Anthony Ada, Senator
- Christopher Duenas, Senator
- Francis E. Santos, Senator, Businessman, CCU
- Gerard Champion, entrepreneur, business owner
- Peter R. Onedera - Writer, Author and Playwright
- Flora Baza Quan - Singer, Author, Musician
- Dr. Bernadita Camacho-Dungca - Educator, Researcher, Author
- Rev. Fr. Eric E. Forbes OFM Cap. - Catholic Priest, Author, Historian,
- Lt. Governor Joshua F. Tenorio
- Mark Forbes, former Legislative Speaker, Senator
- Rev. Fr. Joseph English, OFM Cap.
- Rev. Fr. Agustin A. Gumataotao, OFM Cap.
- Raph Unpingco, artist, activist
- Norbert R. Unpingco, Mr. Tourism, pioneer, cultural ambassador
- Joshua J. Aguon, business owner -Salty CHamoru, teacher

== Government ==
Commissioner of Sinajana
Name	Term begin	Term end
Manuel G. Sablan	1953	1957
Luis C. Baza	1957	1965
Francisco R. Santos	1965	1968
Alfonso M. Pangelinan	1968	January 1, 1973

Mayor of Sinajana
Name	Party	Term begin	Term end
Ignacio N. Sablan	Democratic	January 1, 1973	January 5, 1981
Francisco N. Lizama	Democratic	January 5, 1981	January 6, 1997
Daniel E. Sablan	Democratic	January 6, 1997	January 3, 2005
Roke B. Blas	Democratic	January 3, 2005	January 7, 2013
Robert R.C. Hofmann	Democratic	January 7, 2013	present

=== Deputy Commissioner ===
- Luis C. Baza (1944–1957)
- Vicente S. Iriarte (1957–1961)
- Jacinto B. Calvo (1961–1965)
- Alfonso M. Pangelinan (1965–1967)
- Ignacio N. Sablan (1969–1973)

Vice Mayor of Sinajana
Name	Party	Term begin	Term end
Francisco N. Lizama	Democratic	January 1, 1973	January 5, 1981
Daniel E. Sablan	Democratic	January 5, 1981	January 6, 1997
Roke B. Blas	Democratic	January 6, 1997	January 1, 2001
Vicente S.A. Lizama	Democratic	January 1, 2001	January 3, 2005
Robert R.C. Hofmann	Democratic	January 3, 2005	January 7, 2013
Rudy Don Iriarte	Democratic	January 7, 2013	January 3, 2024 (died)
Office vacant January 3, 2024 – January 30, 2024
Office disestablished January 30, 2024

== See also ==
- Villages of Guam
