= Hågat, Guam =

Coordinates: 13°22′53″N 144°39′17″E

Hågat
- Village
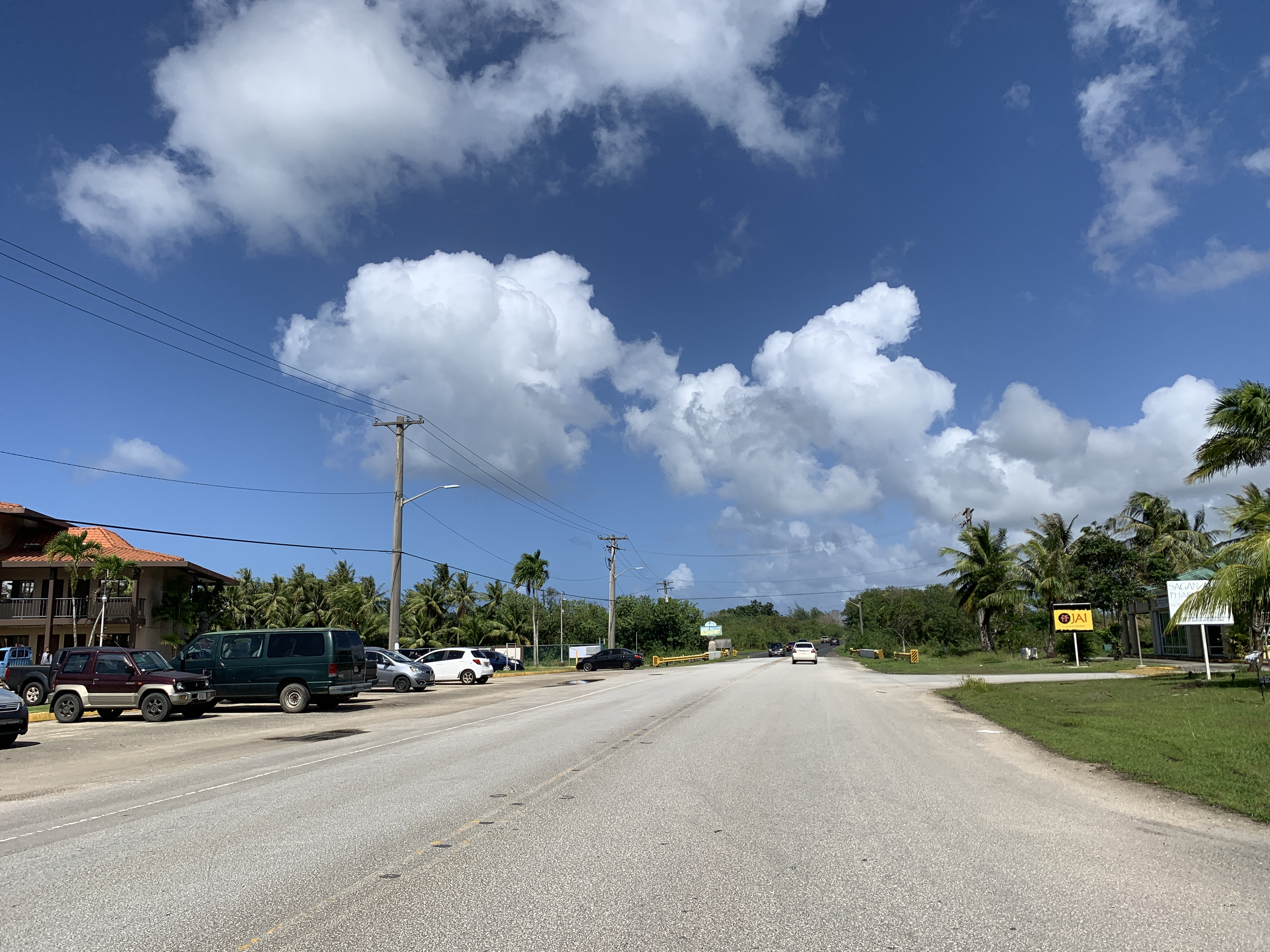

- Location of Agat within the Territory of Guam.
- Country: United States
- Territory: Guam

Government
  - Mayor: Kevin J.T. Susuico (R)
  - Vice mayor: Christopher J. Fejeran (R)

Population (2020)
  - Total: 4,515
  - Ethnic groups: (as of 2,000) 57.8% Chamorro 23.4% Filipino 11.6% two or more races
- Time zone: UTC+10 (ChST)
- Village Flower: Yellow gumamela

Hågat, formerly known as Agat, is a village in the United States territory of Guam. It is located south of Apra Harbor on the island's western shore. The village's population has decreased since the island's 2010 census.

The village is 10 miles (16 km) southwest of Hagåtña, with most of the residents ethnic Chamorros, the indigenous people of Guam. Some of Agat's most notable sites are Mount Alifan, the Agat Marina, the Spanish Bridge, and War In The Pacific National Historical Park.

== History ==
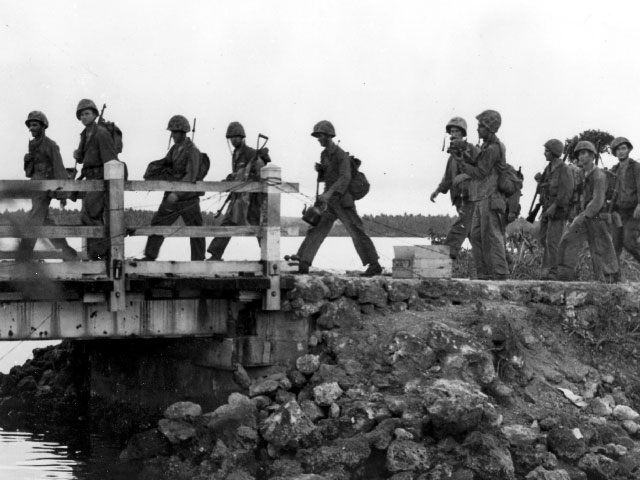
Marines cross a bridge in Agat during the liberation of Guam in 1944

Historical population
Census	Pop.	Note	%±
1960	3,107		—
1970	4,308		38.7%
1980	3,999		−7.2%
1990	4,960		24.0%
2000	5,656		14.0%
2010	4,917		−13.1%
2020	4,515		−8.2%

In 1565, the Spanish explorer Miguel López de Legazpi claimed Guam for Spain. Agat was founded between 1680 and 1684, by the Spanish Governor Don Jose Quiroga, as a military garrison for the purpose of controlling the Chamorro people and converting them to Christianity. Many of its first citizens were brought from the internal village of Fina which was destroyed while the Spanish pacified the island. It was one of six such settlements on Guam in the 18th century. During the 1830s, the Spanish Governor, Captain Villalobos, began constructing facilities in Agat planning to make it the island's new capital. Lack of funds prevented him from completing the project.

In 1898, Guam was transferred from Spain to the United States following the Spanish–American War. Under U.S. Naval administration, Agat was incorporated as a township with an American style municipal government.

During World War II, Japan occupied Guam from 1941 to 1944. During the Battle of Guam in 1944, Agat was one of the two landing sites for U.S. Marines. These sites are now part of the War in the Pacific National Historical Park. The old village was destroyed during the invasion. After capturing Guam, the U.S. military constructed a new residential community in Agat for Guam residents made homeless by the war south of the original village.

In August 2021, Gov. Lou Leon Guerrero signed a bill officially changing the name of the village.

== Climate ==
Climate data for Agat, Guam (1991-2020 normals)
Month	Jan	Feb	Mar	Apr	May	Jun	Jul	Aug	Sep	Oct	Nov	Dec	Year
Average precipitation inches (mm)	4.94 (125)	3.81 (97)	2.74 (70)	4.18 (106)	4.58 (116)	6.80 (173)	12.53 (318)	19.33 (491)	14.02 (356)	13.64 (346)	8.71 (221)	5.97 (152)	101.25 (2,571)
Average precipitation days (≥ 0.01 in)	18.9	16.6	16.1	15.3	17.1	20.5	24.5	26.5	24.7	26.4	22.4	21.6	250.6
Source: NOAA

== Demographics ==
The U.S. Census Bureau counts it under the Agat census-designated place.

== Education ==
=== Primary and secondary schools ===
==== Public schools ====
Guam Public School System serves the island. Marcial Sablan Elementary School and Oceanview Middle School are located in Agat. Southern High School in Santa Rita serves the village. Oceanview Middle School was originally Oceanview High School; the campus became a middle school in 1997.

In regards to the Department of Defense Education Activity (DoDEA), Hågat is in the school attendance zone for McCool Elementary and McCool Middle School, while Guam High School is the island's sole DoDEA high school. DoDEA school material describes the DoDEA school bus services going to Hågat as "limited".

==== Private schools ====
Our Lady of Mount Carmel Catholic School is located in Agat and accommodates students in pre-kindergarten through eighth grade.

=== Public libraries ===
Guam Public Library System operates the Agat Library at 165 Follard Street.

== Government ==
Commissioner of Hågat
Name	Term begin	Term end
Antonio P. Carbullido (1st term)	1930	1937
Tomas C. Charfauros	1934	1937
Francisco R. Chaco	1937	1940
Francisco C. Sablan	1941	1944
Antonio P. Carbullido (2nd term)	1945	1956
Juan L.G. Leon Guerrero	1956	1963
Jose B. Guevara	1963	1965
Thomas F.P. Muña	1965	1969

Mayor of Hågat
Name	Party	Term begin	Term end
Jose S. San Nicolas	Republican	January 1, 1973	January 3, 1977
Antonio R. Terlaje	Democratic	January 3, 1977	January 5, 1981
Antonio C. Babauta	Republican	January 5, 1981	September 30, 1996
Joaquin G. Topasna	Republican	October 1, 1996	January 6, 1997
Johnny M. Reyes	Democratic	January 6, 1997	January 3, 2005
Carol S. Tayama	Republican	January 3, 2005	January 2, 2017
Kevin J.T. Susuico	Republican	January 2, 2017	present

=== Deputy Commissioner ===
- Jose Pereda (1898–1903)
- Jesus Carbullido (1903–1908)
- Pedro C. Charfauros (1931–1933)
- Vicente M. Salas (1934–1937)
- Jose S. San Nicolas (1970–1973)

Vice-Mayor of Hågat
Name	Party	Term begin	Term end
Vicente Q. Guerrero	Republican	January 1, 1973	January 3, 1977
Antonio C. Babauta	Democratic	January 3, 1977	January 5, 1981
Jose R. Reyes	Democratic	January 5, 1981	January 2, 1989
John A. Quidachay	Republican	January 2, 1989	January 4, 1993
Joaquin G. Topasna	Republican	January 4, 1993	September 30, 1996
Jessie S. Pendon	Democratic	October 1, 1996	January 6, 1997
Jesus B. Chaco	Democratic	January 6, 1997	November 11, 2009
Office vacant November 11 – December 23, 2009
Agustin G. Quintanilla	Republican	December 23, 2009	March 19, 2015
Office vacant March 19 – June 8, 2015
Kevin J.T. Susuico	Republican	June 8, 2015	January 2, 2017
Christopher J. Fejeran	Republican	January 2, 2017	present

== Notable people ==
- Michael Cruz (born 1958), surgeon and former 8th Lieutenant Governor of Guam
- Walt Nauta (born 1982 or 1983), valet to Donald Trump
- Dwayne San Nicolas, politician
- Nerissa Bretania Underwood (born 1955), politician

== See also ==
- Villages of Guam
- List of census-designated places in Guam
