= Cocos Island (Guam) =

Island off the southern tip of the United States territory of Guam

Coordinates: 13°14′10″N 144°38′56″E

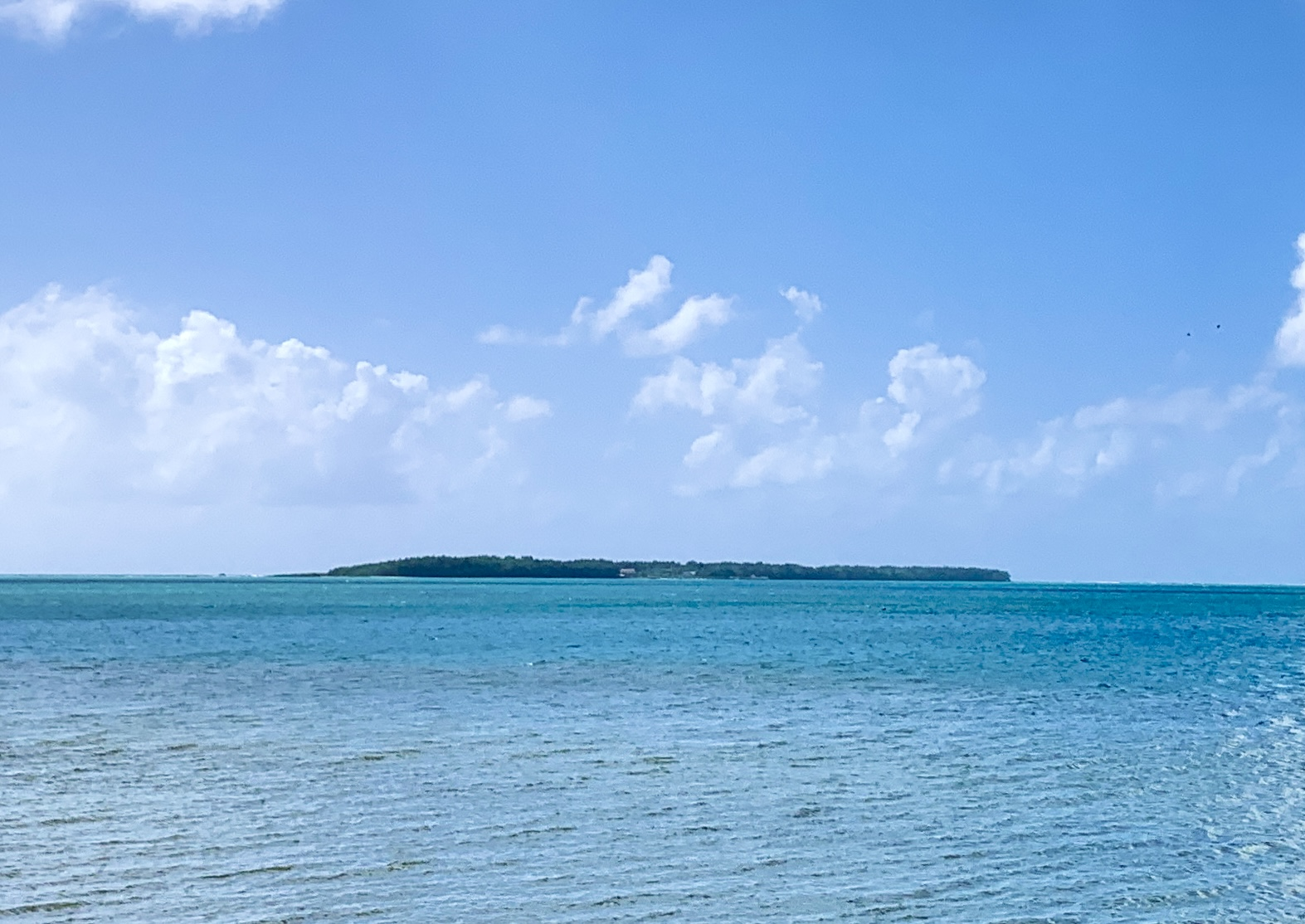

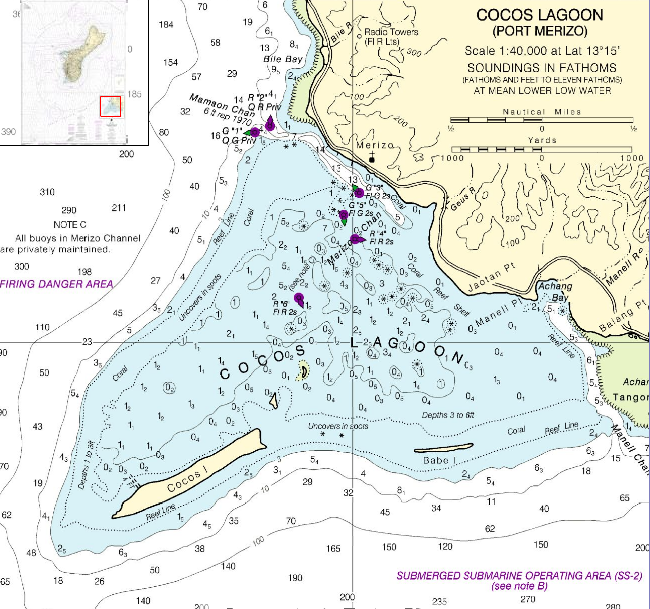
- Nautical chart of Cocos Lagoon, with Cocos Island in the southwest (lower left)

Geography
- Location: Pacific Ocean

Administration
- United States

Additional information
- Time zone: Chamorro Standard Time

Cocos Island (Chamorro: Islan Dåno) is an island 1 mile (1.6 km) off the southern tip of the United States territory of Guam, located within the Merizo Barrier Reef, part of the municipality of Malesso'. The island is uninhabited, 1,600 meters (5,200 ft) long in a southwest–northeast direction, between 200 m (660 ft) and 300 m (980 ft) wide, and has an area of 386,303 m^{2} (95.458 acres). It sits atop the southwestern coral reef rim of Cocos Lagoon.

The east coast of the island is a day resort with a pool, volleyball court, cafe, ice cream parlor, restaurant and bar, and water sports equipment rentals. Visitors to the resort can snorkel, dive, kayak, dolphin watch, parasail, jet ski and bike. The west side is public land, part of the Territorial Park System. Ferries run to Malesso'.

During the Spanish times, the island was owned by Don Ignacio Mendiola Dela Cruz (Tu'an). In the late 1920s, the US government acquired two-thirds of the island via eminent domain. In the mid-1930s, Don Ignacio sold the remaining third to a businessman named Gottwald. A Coast Guard long-range navigation station was built and operated on Cocos Island from 1944 to 1963. In the late 1980s to early 1990s, the US government returned the larger portion of the island to the Guamanian government, which then turned it into a park.

Military tests on soil from Cocos Island in late 2005 showed levels of polychlorinated biphenyls (PCBs) contamination 4,900 times higher than the federally recommended level. Tests on twelve species of fish in the lagoon showed all but one of those species had high levels of PCBs. One had 265 times the acceptable level. The contamination most likely originated from transformers and other electrical equipment at the Coast Guard station, but was not tested for earlier.

Officials from the Guam Environmental Protection Agency, Guam Department of Public Health and Social Services, and the Coast Guard announced their findings on 20 February 2006 and warned people not to eat fish caught in the lagoon.

Cocos Island is one of the few locations to have had the endangered Guam rail reintroduced to it.

On 5 November 2020, the US Department of the Interior and the US Geological Survey announced that the brown tree snake had been found on Cocos Island. The brown tree snake is an invasive species responsible for the eradication of many species of wildlife native to Guam, including birds and lizards. It is thought to have arrived as a stowaway in cargo, and was first detected in the 1950s. It causes millions of dollars in damage each year, most notably to the electrical system because it climbs the poles and shorts the wires.

== Important Bird Area ==
Cocos Island has been recognized as an Important Bird Area (IBA) by BirdLife International because it supports populations of Micronesian starlings and Guam rails.

== See also ==
- Health effects of PCBs
- List of rivers of Guam

== Bibliography ==
- The Island of Guam By Leonard Martin Cox
