= Villages of Guam =

Villages of Guam Songsong Guåhan (Chamorro)
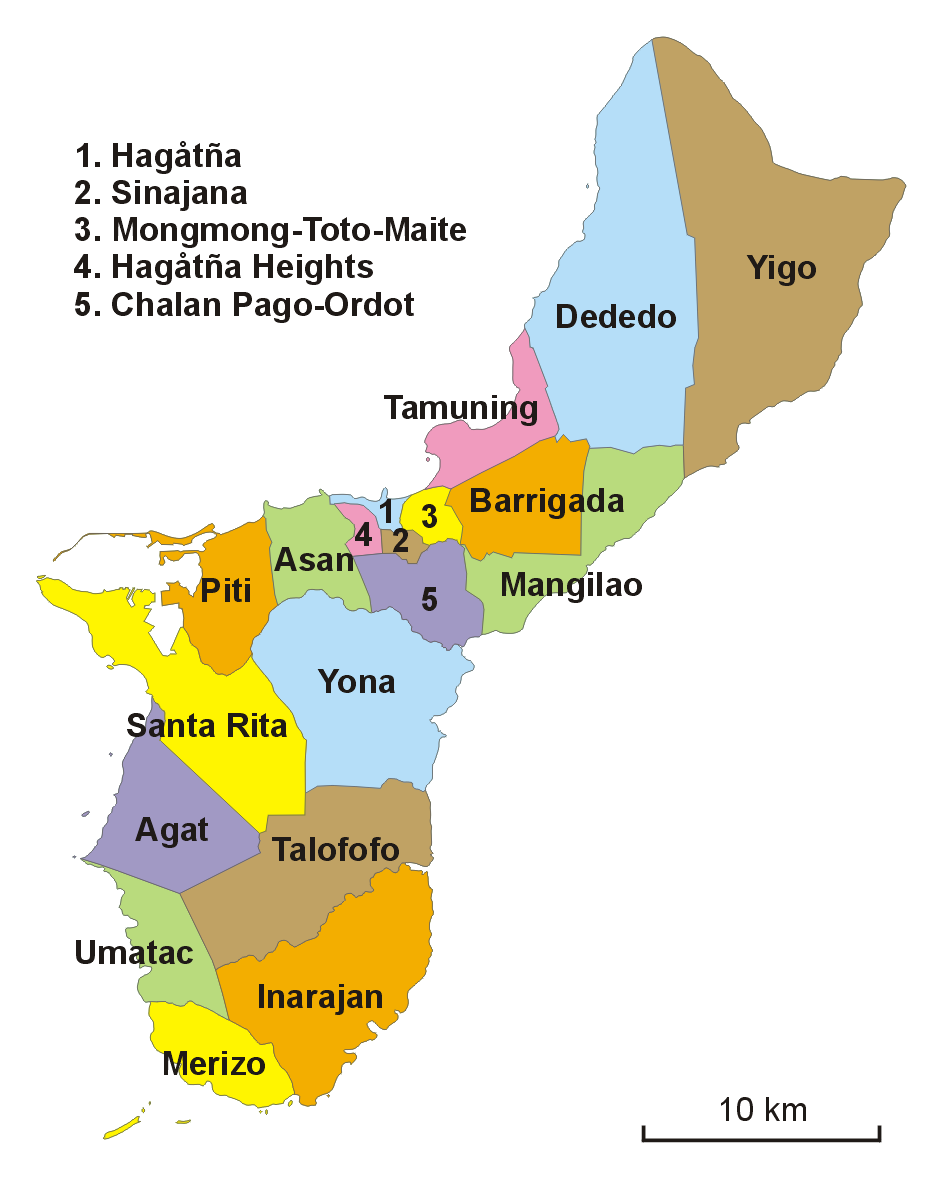
- Category: County equivalent
- Location: Guam
- Number: 19
- Populations: 647 (Umatac) – 44,908 (Dededo)
- Areas: 0.89 sq mi (2.3 km^{2}) (Sinajana) – 35.61 sq mi (92.2 km^{2}) (Yigo)
- Government: Local government

The United States territory of Guam is divided into nineteen municipalities, called villages. Each village is governed by an elected mayor. Village populations range in size from under 1,000 to over 40,000. In the 2020 census, the total population of Guam was 153,836.

== History ==
Many villages have rich histories reaching back thousands of years. Artifacts from ancient Chamorro settlements can be found in every village of Guam. When the Spanish Empire colonized the Marianas Islands as part of its Pacific possessions in the 16th and 17th centuries, the island was divided into separate districts with each district consisting of a parish with a village center governed by a Mayor alcalde, appointed by the island's governor.

In the 18th century, there were six parishes on Guam: Hagåtña, Hagat, Humåtak, Malesso', Inalåjan, and Pago.

Prior to Spanish colonization, Chamorro people regularly held village celebrations. After adopting Christianity, these celebrations became festivals (fiestas) in honor of the patron saint of each village. Annual village fiestas are still held throughout the island every year.

The current division of Guam into municipalities took place in the 1920s under United States Navy Administration. Santa Rita was formerly Sumay, before the U.S. taking of that village after World War II.

== List of villages ==
Village	Region	Land area		Population		Population density (2020)	
Village	Region	sq mi	km^{2}	2020	2010	per sq mi	per km^{2}
Agana Heights	Central	1.03	2.67	3,673	3,808	3,566	1,377
Asan-Maina	Central	5.69	14.74	2,011	2,137	353	136
Barrigada	Central	8.50	22.01	7,956	8,875	936	361
Chalan Pago-Ordot	Central	5.67	14.69	7,064	6,822	1,246	481
Dededo	North	30.52	79.05	44,908	44,943	1,471	568
Hågat (formerly Agat)	South	10.33	26.75	4,515	4,917	437	169
Hagåtña	Central	0.95	2.46	943	1,051	993	383
Humåtak (formerly Umatac)	South	6.25	16.19	647	782	104	40
Inalåhan (formerly Inarajan)	South	18.74	48.54	2,317	2,273	124	48
Malesso' (formerly Merizo)	South	6.26	16.21	1,604	1,850	256	99
Mangilao	Central	10.19	26.39	13,476	15,191	1,322	511
Mongmong-Toto-Maite	Central	1.82	4.71	6,380	6,825	3,505	1,353
Piti	Central	7.54	19.53	1,585	1,454	210	81
Sånta Rita-Sumai (formerly Santa Rita)	South	16.26	42.11	6,470	6,084	398	154
Sinajana	Central	0.89	2.31	2,611	2,592	2,934	1,133
Talo'fo'fo (formerly Talofofo)	South	17.79	46.08	3,550	3,050	200	77
Tamuning	North	5.65	14.63	18,489	19,685	3,272	1,263
Yigo	North	35.61	92.23	19,339	20,539	543	210
Yona	South	20.12	52.11	6,298	6,480	313	121
Guam		209.81	543.41	153,836	159,358	733	283

== See also ==
- List of census-designated places in Guam
- List of villages in the Northern Mariana Islands
- Geography of Guam
- Village (United States)
