= Inalåhan, Guam =

Coordinates: 13°16′32″N 144°44′36″E

Inalåhan
- Village
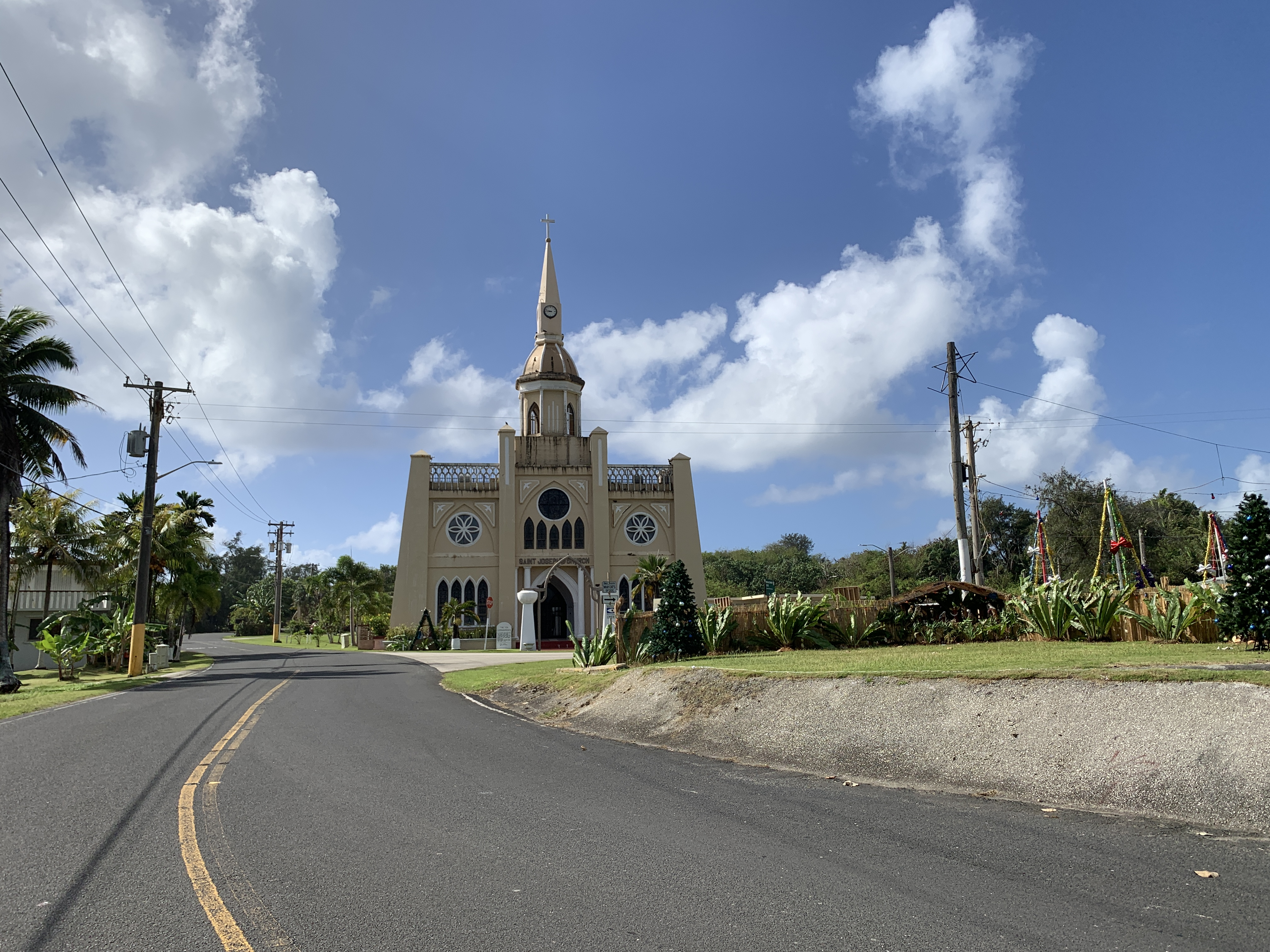
- Saint Joseph’s Church, Inalåhan, 2022.

- Location of Inalåhan within the Territory of Guam.
- Country: United States
- Territory: Guam

Government
  - Mayor: Anthony P. Chargualaf Jr. (D)

Population (2020)
  - Total: 2,317
- Time zone: UTC+10 (ChST)
- Inalåhan Village
- U.S. National Register of Historic Places
- U.S. Historic district
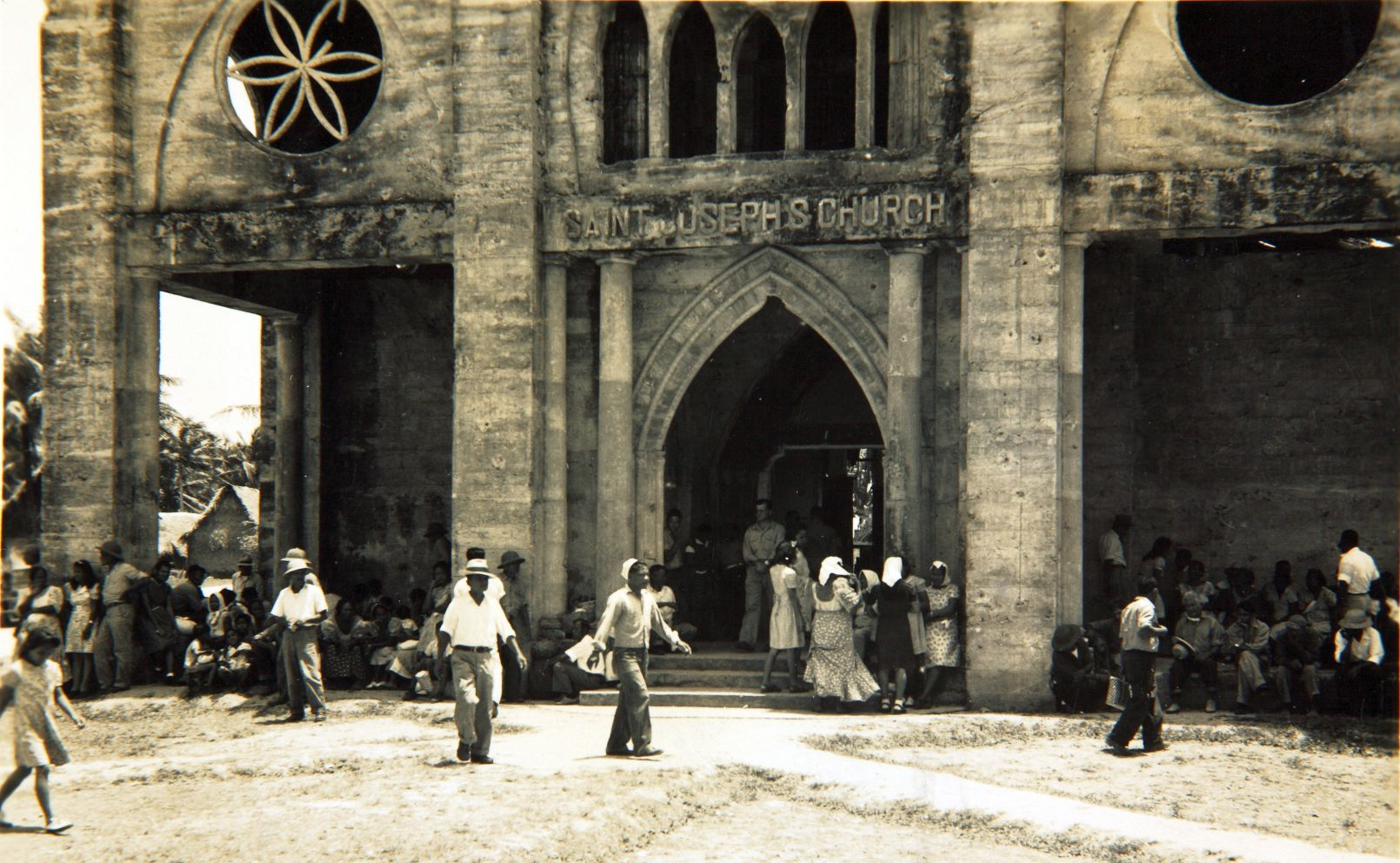
- Outside Saint Joseph’s Church in Inalåhan, ca. 1944–1947

- Location within Guam
- Location: Guam Highway 4
- Area: 49 acres (20 ha)
- Built: 1901
- Architects: Cruz, Jose Duena; Luttrull, A.I.
- NRHP reference No.: 77001569
- Added to NRHP: November 7, 1977

Historical population
Census	Pop.	Note	%±
1960	1,730		—
1970	1,897		9.7%
1980	2,059		8.5%
1990	2,469		19.9%
2000	3,052		23.6%
2010	2,273		−25.5%
2020	2,317		1.9%

Inalåhan, formerly known as Inarajan, is a village located on the southeastern coast of the United States territory of Guam. The village's original Chamoru name, Inalåhan, was altered when transliterated during Spanish rule of the island.

== History ==
The village history predates the 1521 discovery of Guam by the Spanish. It was the home to the legendary Chief Gadao, and was one of the few villages with sizable populations at the end of Spanish rule in 1898. In 1950 it had a population of 1,494, with 814 living in the village itself. Today, it is the best preserved of the Spanish-era villages and is known for its rich history and culture, and has been listed on the National Register of Historic Places. The village's population has increased slightly since the island's 2010 census.

Places of interest include the village's pre-World War II church, statue of Chief Gadao, the Gef Pa'go Chamorro Village, the ancient Paintings of Chief Gadao's Cave, and historic village architecture. The municipality of Inalåhan includes the community of Malojloj, in the hills north of the central village. Malojloj and Inalåhan each celebrate separate village fiestas. Many residents from the Malojloj section of Inalahan, claim themselves to be a separate village, seeing as they celebrate different fiestas and they have their own land boundary. In Southern Guam, it is easily recognisable as to what part is proper to Inalahan, and what is proper to Malojloj.

The Dandan region of Malojloj was the site of a NASA Apollo tracking station and is the current the site of the Layon Municipal Sanitary Landfill for Guam replacing the Ordot Dump. The Landfill was opposed immensely by the residents of the village as well as many environmentalists, but the government of Guam overruled them.

On April 9, 2021, Governor Lou Leon Guerrero signed Bill 60 into law, which changed the official name of the village of Inarajan to Inalåhan.

== Demographics ==
The U.S. Census Bureau counts the following census-designated places in Inalåhan: Inarajan, and Malojloj.

== Education ==
Guam Public School System serves the island. Inarajan Elementary School and Inarajan Middle School are in Inalåhan. Southern High School in Santa Rita serves the village. Inarajan High School, formerly located in Inalåhan, closed in 1997.

In regards to the Department of Defense Education Activity (DoDEA), Inalåhan is in the school attendance zone for McCool Elementary and McCool Middle School, while Guam High School is the island's sole DoDEA high school. No DoDEA school buses go to Inalåhan.

== Populated places ==
- Asagas
- Malojloj

== Notable residents ==
- Former Vice Speaker David L.G. Shimizu

== Government ==
Name	Party	Term begin	Term end	Notes
Mayor of Inalåhan
Jamie D.S. Paulino	Democratic	January 5, 1981	1988	Late honorable Jaime D.S Paulino served as president of Mayor's Council of Guam. He was also a survivor of the Japanese occupation of Guam and once the chairman of the Democratic Party of Guam.
Edward C. Crisostomo	N/A	1988	1988	He was appointed by Governor of Guam
Eddie C. Paulino	N/A	1988	January 2, 1989	
Juan C. Cruz	Republican	January 2, 1989	January 4, 1993	
Jesse L.G. Perez	Democratic	January 4, 1993	January 1, 2001	
Franklin M. Taitague	Republican	January 1, 2001	January 7, 2013	
Doris F. Lujan	Democratic	January 7, 2013	January 4, 2021	Election in office.
Anthony P. Chargualaf Jr.	Democratic	January 4, 2021	present	
