= List of bridges on the National Register of Historic Places in Guam =

This is a list of bridges and tunnels on the National Register of Historic Places in the U.S. territory of Guam.

Name	Image	Built	Listed	Location	Type
Agana Spanish Bridge		1800	1974-09-06	Agana; 13°28′30″N 144°44′53″E	
Taelayag Spanish Bridge			1974-10-10	Agat; 13°21′12″N 144°38′36″E	Spanish stone and mortar
Taleyfac Spanish Bridge			1974-09-10	Agat; 13°21′36″N 144°38′49″E	Spanish stone
