= Felix Ungacta =

Guamanian politician and businessman

Mayor of Hagåtña
- In office January 5, 1981 – January 3, 2005
- Preceded by: Thomas F. Mendiola
- Succeeded by: John A. Cruz

Personal details
- Born: Felix Flores Ungacta; November 8, 1937 Guam
- Died: October 24, 2016 (aged 78) Guam
- Party: Republican
- Spouse: Evelyn Martinez Duenas
- Children: 4

Felix Flores Ungacta (November 8, 1937 – October 24, 2016) was a Guamanian politician and businessman. He served as the mayor of Hagåtña, the capital city and seat of government of Guam, from January 5, 1981 to January 3, 2005, becoming one of the territory's longest-serving mayors in history. The village's name was changed from Agana to Hagåtña in 1998, while the office he held was renamed from Commissioner to Mayor during his tenure. He was a member of the Republican Party of Guam.

== Biography ==
Ungacta was born on Guam on November 8, 1937 to Felix U. Ungacta and Engarcia Flores Ungacta. He spent twenty-five years in elected office in Hagåtña.

He was first elected as the Commissioner of Agana (which later became the Mayor) in 1980 and took office 1981. During his early tenure during the 1980s and early 1990s, Agana saw an economic resurgence with the construction of several major new developments, including the Sagan Dinana and Chamorro Village (Ysengsong Chamorro), as well as the renovation of Paseo Stadium. However, the area experienced an economic downturn during the late 1990s due to the relocations of government offices from Hagåtña to nearby Tiyan. As mayor, Ungacta fought to maintain the resources and funding necessary to retain Hagåtña's status as the island's political, cultural and commercial center.

Outside of politics, Ungacta and his wife owned and operated a longtime hot dog stand on the beach in Hagåtña.

Ungacta died in Guam on October 24, 2016, at the age of 78 in Tamuning, Guam. He was survived by his wife, Evelyn Martinez Duenas, and their four children, Felix Ungacta Jr., Grace Ungacta Bone, Noel Ungacta and Jonah Ungacta. Ungacta's funeral was held at Dulce Nombre de Maria Cathedral Basilica in Hagåtña on November 4, 2016, with burial at Guam Veterans Cemetery.

Governor Eddie Calvo ordered flags flown at half staff in Ungacta's honor.

Political offices
Preceded by Thomas F. Mendiola	Mayor of Hagåtña, Guam; 1981–2005	Succeeded by John A. Cruz
