= List of BanG Dream! episodes =

Promotional art for the first season

BanG Dream! is a Japanese music media franchise owned by Bushiroad that includes an anime television series. The anime currently has three seasons for the main series, six films, one OVA and four spin-off anime series.

The first season, focusing on the creation of the band Poppin'Party, was produced by Issen and Xebec and aired from January 21 to April 22, 2017, with an original video animation episode being additionally released on November 22, 2017. The second season, which expands the franchise's scope to include more bands, was now produced in computer-generated animation by Sanzigen and aired from January 3 to March 28, 2019. The studio would later produce the third season, which aired from January 23 to April 23, 2020, and follows the BanG Dream! Girls Band Challenge and the growth of Raise A Suilen.

In 2018, two chibi spin-off series titled Pastel Life and BanG Dream! Girls Band Party! Pico began broadcast in May and July, respectively; both are three-minute shorts, with the former following Pastel Palettes and the latter covering every band. For its theme song, Pastel Life's subject group plays "Shuwarin Dreaming". A second season to Pico titled BanG Dream! Girls Band Party! Pico: Ohmori aired from May to October 2020. BanG Dream! Girls Band Party! Pico Fever! aired from October 2021 to March 2022. A 52-episode miniseries titled Ganso! BanG Dream! Chan was revealed in August 2025, and was released from October 2, 2025, to October 1, 2026, on YouTube. In 2022, to commemorate the fifth anniversary of the BanG Dream! Girls Band Party! mobile game, Sanzigen released a two-part series titled BanG Dream! Girls Band Party! 5th Anniversary Animation: Circle Thanks Party!

Various movies have also been produced by Sanzigen. BanG Dream! Film Live, directed by Tomomi Umetsu and written by Kō Nakamura, premiered on September 13, 2019. A sequel, Film Live 2nd Stage, came out August 20, 2021. Story-driven films include the two-part Episode of Roselia series released on April 23 and June 25, 2021, and Poppin'Dream! on January 1, 2022. A movie, BanG Dream! Ave Mujica prima aurora, was released on October 16, 2026.

Several spin-off series centered on specific bands would also be produced, with the most prominent being three anime television series chronicling the formation and growth of MyGO!!!!! and Ave Mujica. An anime focusing on MyGO!!!!! that serves as the chronological sequel to the main series, titled BanG Dream! It's MyGO!!!!!, aired from June 29 to September 14, 2023. Its direct sequel focusing on Ave Mujica, titled BanG Dream! Ave Mujica, aired from January 2 to March 27, 2025. Their sequel, titled BanG Dream! MyGO!!!!! // Ave Mujica, is set to premiere on January 8, 2027.

Other spin-off series have been produced. A Morfonica-focused series called Morfonication was released online on July 28 and 29, 2022. An anime television series centered around Mugendai MewType produced by Sanzigen's subsidiary Nichicaline, titled BanG Dream! Yume∞Mita, aired from July 2 to September 10, 2026.

== Series overview ==
Season	Episodes	Originally released	
Season	Episodes	First released	Last released
1	13	January 21, 2017	April 22, 2017
2	13	January 3, 2019	March 28, 2019
3	13	January 23, 2020	April 23, 2020

Spin-off	Episodes	Originally released	
Spin-off	Episodes	First released	Last released
Morfonication	2	July 28, 2022	July 29, 2022
It's MyGO!!!!!	13	June 29, 2023	September 14, 2023
Ave Mujica	13	January 2, 2025	March 27, 2025
Yume∞Mita	13	July 2, 2026	September 10, 2026

== Episodes ==
=== Main series ===
==== Season 1 (2017) ====
No. overall	No. in season	Title (Note: All English titles are taken from Anime Network.)	Directed by	Written by	Storyboarded by	Original release date
1	1	"We Met!" "Deacchatta!" (Japanese: 出会っちゃった！)	Atsushi Ōtsuki & Tsuyoshi Nakano	Yuniko Ayana	Atsushi Ōtsuki	January 21, 2017
Kasumi Toyama starts her life at Hanasakigawa High, where she joins numerous clubs in her search for a "sparkling, heart-pounding" feeling she once had when she looked up at the stars as a child called the "Star Beat". Along the way, she quickly befriends classmate Sāya Yamabuki. While heading home, Kasumi is led by a trail of golden stars towards a pawn shop owned by Arisa Ichigaya's family and discovers a star-shaped guitar. After hearing Glitter Green perform at the live house Space, which causes her buried feeling to emerge, she decides she wants to form a band.
2	2	"We Did It!" "Yacchatta!" (Japanese: やっちゃった！)	Masaharu Tomoda	Yuniko Ayana	Makoto Hoshino	January 28, 2017
Kasumi is determined to form a band, and she begins asking her friends to be members. Arisa is insistent on not joining and puts the guitar up for sale. Kasumi ends up breaking the guitar by accident, but upon seeing her attachment to it once it gets fixed, Arisa lets her keep it for a cheap price.
3	3	"I Ran Away!" "Nigechatta!" (Japanese: 逃げちゃった！)	So Toyama	Yasuhiro Nakanishi	Shunsuke Nakashige	February 4, 2017
Rimi Ushigome, one of Kasumi's classmates and the younger sister of Glitter Green's lead vocalist Yuri, is reluctant to join her band due to her social anxiety. Glitter Green is late to their performance, prompting Kasumi to go onto stage and buy time by singing "Twinkle, Twinkle, Little Star" with Arisa in tow, prompting Rimi to join in with her bass. When Glitter Green arrives, they perform a cover of "Twinkle, Twinkle, Little Star" with Kasumi, Arisa, and Rimi. Rimi formally joins Kasumi's band.
4	4	"I Got Angry!" "Okocchatta!" (Japanese: 怒っちゃった！)	Shunsuke Nakashige	Yuniko Ayana	Shunsuke Nakashige	February 11, 2017
Kasumi is put in supplementary classes with guitarist Tae Hanazono, and the two become close. As Kasumi begins to skip practice with Rimi and Arisa to get private guitar lessons from Tae, Arisa begins expressing jealousy. Upon realizing Arisa is upset, Kasumi begins inviting Tae to Arisa's house, to her annoyance. Although Kasumi recruits Tae to join her band, she refuses.
5	5	"My Heart Was Racing!" "Dokidoki shichatta!" (Japanese: ドキドキしちゃった！)	Masayuki Iimura	Yuniko Ayana	Kaito Asakura	February 18, 2017
Kasumi's band is challenged by Tae to put on a performance that will make her heart flutter. Rimi shows the others a song about chocolate cornets that she once wrote with her sister, and they begin practicing it, with Tae's occasional aid. While watching their practices, Tae becomes inspired to join their performance of "My Heart is a Chocolate Coronet" with them.
6	6	"I Made It!" "Tsukuchatta!" (Japanese: 作っちゃった！)	Makoto Hoshino	Yasuhiro Nakanishi	Makoto Hoshino & Kumiko Habara	February 25, 2017
Kasumi is the president of the school's cultural festival planning committee and appoints Sāya as the vice president. Arisa attempts to come up with a name for their band and eventually comes up with Poppin'Party, and Sāya runs across one of her old bandmates, Natsuki.
7	7	"We Fought!" "Kenka shichatta!" (Japanese: ケンカしちゃった！)	Tsuyoshi Nakano	Yasuhiro Nakanishi	Hiroaki Yoshikawa	March 4, 2017
Sāya is revealed to have left her old band CHiSPA when her mother was hospitalized with anemia just before their debut live. Poppin'Party learns of Sāya's past when they meet Natsuki, and Kasumi attempts to convince Sāya to join her band. Sāya refuses, not wanting to neglect her family or hold the band back, leaving Kasumi heartbroken.
8	8	"I Ran!" "Hashicchatta!" (Japanese: 走っちゃった！)	Naoki Ōhira	Yasuhiro Nakanishi	Hiroaki Yoshikawa	March 11, 2017
The cultural festival is underway, and Poppin'Party prepares for their performance without Sāya. Sāya's mother is admitted to the hospital; although Sāya is adamant about staying by her side, she insists her daughter goes to the festival when she sees her crying over the lyrics of Poppin'Party's new song, left to her in a note from Kasumi. She arrives just in time and performs the song "Star Beat! Hoshi no Kodou" with everyone else.
9	9	"I Got a Job!" "Baito shichatta!" (Japanese: バイトしちゃった！)	Shunsuke Nakashige	Yūko Kakihara	Shunsuke Nakashige & Kumiko Habara	March 25, 2017
Sāya buys a new drum kit while Kasumi purchases a distortion pedal. Tae learns Space is understaffed for an upcoming performance due to an influenza outbreak, and Poppin'Party volunteers as part-time workers to gain experience. The band parlays the work into an audition, but fail to impress the owner Shifune Tsuzuki. Shifune then tells Poppin'Party that Space is closing down soon.
10	10	"I Got Surprised!" "Odoroichatta!" (Japanese: 驚いちゃった！)	Kazuhisa Ōno	Yasuhiro Nakanishi	Kumiko Habara	April 1, 2017
When CHisPA passes their audition at Space, Poppin'Party wonders what they differently, and Kasumi becomes adamant about practicing as much as possible for their next attempt. She approaches Shifune about auditioning again but is told that she performed the worst of the five, greatly affecting her. Kasumi elects to practice more often, but the accumulated stress causes her to lose her voice on stage during their audition.
11	11	"I Couldn't Sing Anymore" "Utaenaku Nacchatta" (Japanese: 歌えなくなっちゃった)	Satoshi Nakagawa	Yuniko Ayana	N/A	April 8, 2017
Kasumi is devastated over losing her voice, while the rest of Poppin'Party agree to practice without her until she recovers. She admits to her sister Asuka and Yuri that her lost voice was a product of overcompensating for being the worst member by practicing too much. The other members of the band strive to help her overcome her struggles, including agreeing to split their audition song's lyrics by member.
12	12	"I Sparkled!" "Kirakira shichatta!" (Japanese: キラキラしちゃった！)	Tsuyoshi Nakano	Yasuhiro Nakanishi	Kumiko Habara	April 15, 2017
As school finals come around, Poppin'Party prepares for their final chance to impress Shifune. Despite several members believing they messed up their parts, the owner passes them and grants them the chance to play at Space.
13	13	"We Sang!" "Utacchatta!" (Japanese: 歌っちゃった！)	Atsushi Ōtsuki	Yuniko Ayana	Shunsuke Nakashige	April 22, 2017
At Space's final show, Kasumi and her friends prepare themselves for their first proper live performance. After listening to Glitter Green and CHiSPA, they perform to a positive reception, kick-starting their road to popularity as Poppin'Party.
OVA	OVA	"We Had Some Fun!" "Asonjatta!" (Japanese: 遊んじゃった！)	Atsushi Ōtsuki	Yuniko Ayana	Tomoya Takahashi	November 22, 2017
Poppin'Party and Roselia head to the beach to take a break from homework and band practice respectively, and eventually meet up to have fun. At the end of the day, Poppin'Party performs a song at a beach cafe as part of a sound check. This inspires Roselia vocalist Yukina Minato on a new guitar phrase and Roselia to practice their new song.

==== Season 2 (2019) ====
No. overall	No. in season	Title (Note: All English titles are taken from HIDIVE.)	Directed by (Note: Production staff information is taken from the ending credits of each episode)	Written by	Storyboarded by	Original release date
14	1	"Happy Party!"	Masanori Uetaka	Yuniko Ayana	Kōdai Kakimoto	January 3, 2019
Kasumi and Poppin'Party enter their second year of high school. While returning from Arisa's house with her bandmates, Kasumi expresses interest in performing live again. This opportunity is granted when first-year student Rokka Asahi asks them to play at the reopened Galaxy live house alongside fellow girl bands Afterglow, Hello, Happy World!, and Roselia. At the conclusion of the live show, Poppin'Party and Roselia announce they will host their own self-sponsored live shows.
15	2	"Black Shout"; Transliteration: "Kuroki Hōkō" (Japanese: 黒き咆哮)	Naruyo Takahashi	Yasuhiro Nakanishi	Naruyo Takahashi	January 10, 2019
Poppin'Party starts organizing their self-sponsored show, but become overwhelmed by the sheer amount of planning behind a live event. They are invited by Roselia to perform as a guest band at their respective concert which Asuka and Rokka attend. After the show, when Roselia and Poppin'Party come together, Yukina judges that Poppin'Party is not ready to put together their own show.
16	3	"Sing Girls"	Fujiaki Asari	Yuniko Ayana	Naotaka Hayashi	January 17, 2019
Discouraged by Yukina's words, Kasumi and her friends feel doubtful about the likelihood and success of their show. Later, Kasumi meets Rokka in town and they visit Rokka's room before they attend Poppin'Party's band practice. Rokka recounts her life, including her wishes to form her own band, which prompts Poppin'Party to perform a song. This motivates both parties to pursue their respective goals. Meanwhile, Chiyu Tamade (CHU2) approaches Yukina about becoming Roselia's producer, but is denied; angered, she vows to destroy Roselia with her own band.
17	4	"Magnificent! Dynamic!? A Carefree World!"; Transliteration: "Gōka! Gōkai!? Nobbi no Wārudo!" (Japanese: ゴーカ！ごーかい！？のっびのびワールド！)	Takahiro Majima	Midori Gotō	Naruyo Takahashi	January 24, 2019
After Kasumi suggests flying at the self-sponsored show, Kokoro Tsurumaki seeks to prove the absurd idea is possible and to make Poppin'Party smile. To do so, Hello, Happy World! invites Poppin'Party to Kokoro's cruise ship, where they put on a concert before going on a hot air balloon, where Kokoro and Michelle jump off the balloon to fly in the sky after some initial mishaps. The show motivates Poppin'Party to do their best in planning their show.
18	5	"Rainy Ring-Dong-Dance"; Transliteration: "Ame no Ring-Dong-Dance" (Japanese: 雨のRing-Dong-Dance)	Yū Nobuta	Yuniko Ayana & Yuki Matsuno	Yū Nobuta	January 31, 2019
Pastel Palettes prepares to perform in the World Idol Festival. However, bassist Chisato Shirasagi has to attend to other commitments, making practicing together difficult. On top of that, Chisato feels doubtful about singing and playing the bass at the same time for a duet song, but is motivated by vocalist Aya Maruyama and the other members of Pastel Palettes to practice together. In the end, Pastel Palettes' performance in the World Idol Festival goes smoothly with both Aya and Chisato singing their song.
19	6	"You Only Live Once"	Fujiaki Asari	Yūko Kakihara	Ikuo Morimoto & Kōdai Kakimoto	February 7, 2019
Afterglow and Poppin'Party are invited to play at the shopping district festival. However, the show is delayed due to rain, during which Afterglow recounts their formation. Once the rain subsides, the two bands perform. Poppin'Party concludes the show by announcing their self-sponsored concert will be at Galaxy, to Rokka's surprise.
20	7	"I Won't Cry, I Won't Cry"; Transliteration: "Nakana Ina Kanai" (Japanese: ナカナ イナ カナイ)	Kazuo Nogami	Yuniko Ayana	Naruyo Takahashi	February 14, 2019
Thanks to Pastel Palettes guitarist and Haneoka High student council president Hina Hikawa, her school and Hanasakigawa prepare for a joint cultural festival. Hina also forms a band of students from both schools (made up of Aya, Afterglow's Moca Aoba and Tsugumi Hazawa, Roselia's Lisa Imai, as well as Hello, Happy World! member Kanon Matsubara) to perform at the festival. Poppin'Party prepares for their performances at both the cultural festival and their live show, with Tae choosing to gain additional experience with impromptu street performances. During one session, she reunites with her childhood friend Rei Wakana (Layer). Rei recalls the two promising to form a band together and brings up the idea, to which Tae hesitates.
21	8	"You're Not Alone"; Transliteration: "Hitori ja naindakara" (Japanese: ひとりじゃないんだから)	Naruyo Takahashi	Midori Gotō	Kotaro Kurosugi	February 21, 2019
Tae talks to Poppin'Party about becoming a support guitarist for Rei's new band in order to improve her skills. Despite their worries about Tae's increased workload, they give their blessings and she is introduced to Raise A Suilen, led by Chiyu. Meanwhile, the culture festival band write a song and do an open rehearsal in front of students from both schools.
22	9	"School Festival Symphony"; Transliteration: "Sukūru Fesutibaru Sinfonī" (Japanese: スクール・フェスティバル・シンフォニー)	Masanori Uetaka	Yasuhiro Nakanishi	Naotaka Hayashi	February 28, 2019
The joint cultural festival begins as each class runs their own booths. Meanwhile, Tae continues practicing with Raise A Suilen in preparation for their first live shows, forgoing practicing for the festival. Consequently, Poppin'Party delays their performance. However, Raise A Suilen's debut concert leads to them playing a three-song encore, forcing Rokka and Roselia to stall for Poppin'Party by performing. Kasumi sets out to find Tae, and although the two run back to the school together, they arrive too late.
23	10	"Riot"	You Nakano	Midori Gotō	Yū Nobuta	March 7, 2019
Poppin'Party go around and thank members of the other bands and Rokka for covering for them during the concert. A discouraged Tae announces she would leave Raise A Suilen, which Rei accepts while Chiyu does not. Tae practices and plays with Raise A Suilen in her last live with the band, with Poppin'Party and the other groups in attendance. After the show, Chiyu proclaims her intention to take Tae away from Poppin'Party.
24	11	"Star Tears"; Transliteration: "Hoshi no Namida" (Japanese: ホシノナミダ)	Takahiro Majima	Yuniko Ayana	Fujiaki Asari	March 14, 2019
Chiyu meets with all five members of Poppin'Party and reiterates her desire to have Tae in her band. After she leaves, Poppin'Party expresses doubt about their future after the self-sponsored show. The next day, Kasumi meets Tae after finishing preparations for the day and plays a song for her, which inspires Tae to write the lyrics for a new song that she plays in front of Kasumi and the others. To her bandmates' joy, Tae re-affirms her desire to play with Poppin'Party.
25	12	"Returns"	Kazuo Nogami	Yasuhiro Nakanishi	Naruyo Takahashi	March 21, 2019
Poppin'Party prepares for their live show at Galaxy and works to refine Tae's song, while the other bands (sans Raise A Suilen) accept their invitation to perform and provide their set lists. The bands have their dress rehearsals the day before the performance, where Poppin'Party plays their new song in front of the others.
26	13	"Kizuna Music"; Transliteration: "Kizuna Myūjikku" (Japanese: キズナミュージック)	Fujiaki Asari	Midori Gotō	Kōdai Kakimoto	March 28, 2019
The five bands set up Galaxy for Poppin'Party's self-sponsored show. Poppin'Party opens the concert with their new song, to the others' surprise. The other four bands follow suit, starting with their newly-created pieces. As the live comes to an end, Kasumi thanks the audience for supporting the band before performing a new song that she wrote; afterwards, Poppin'Party returns for an encore to sing one last song. While leaving Galaxy, the five encounter Chiyu, who declares she will destroy them and Roselia.

==== Season 3 (2020) ====
No. overall	No. in season	Title	Directed by	Written by	Storyboarded by	Original release date	(Note: First release date of episode in HIDIVE and limited-edition albums in Japan.)
27	1	"It's The Ultimate Dream, Don't You Think!?"; Transliteration: "Saikō no Yume desu yo ne!" (Japanese: 最高の夢一一ですよね！)	Naruyo Takahashi	Yuniko Ayana	Naruyo Takahashi	January 23, 2020	January 7, 2020
Three months after Poppin'Party's self-sponsored live show, the local live house owners, including CiRCLE member Marina Tsukishima, organize the BanG Dream! Girls Band Challenge, a tournament with the final taking place at the Nippon Budokan. Poppin'Party and Afterglow express their interest in participating, and although Kasumi invites Rokka to join them, she declines as she is still searching for a band. Meanwhile, Chiyu struggles to find a new guitarist for Raise A Suilen until she watches Rokka's performance at the cultural festival. Chiyu invites Poppin'Party, Roselia, and Rokka to her band's concert, where she announces the band's entry into the Girls Band Challenge and openly offers Rokka an audition, much to her dismay.
28	2	"Scared to Death"; Transliteration: "Obieteru janai" (Japanese: おびえてるじゃない)	Takami Majima	Midori Gotō	Toshihiko Masuda	January 30, 2020	January 14, 2020
Although she immediately declines Chiyu's offer, Rokka continues to be scouted for Raise A Suilen, including being chased by her and RAS keyboardist Pareo in school and around town. In the meantime, Chiyu reiterates her challenge to Yukina; seeing similarities in the bands' philosophies, Yukina decides to have Roselia enter the Girls Band Challenge. Later in the night, after seeing Rokka practice her guitar in the Galaxy live house, RAS drummer Masuki Satō (Masking) takes Rokka to Chiyu's studio, where she performs alongside RAS. Unimpressed with Rokka's lackluster performance, she decides not to include her in RAS, explaining she cannot accept those withholding their skills to satisfy her.
29	3	"I'm Not Leaving!"; Transliteration: "Kaeran!" (Japanese: 帰らん！)	Hiroshi Morita	Hitomi Ogawa	Toshihiko Masuda	February 6, 2020	January 14, 2020
The preliminaries for the BanG Dream! Girls Band Challenge begin with the top two teams in vote count going to the finals at the Budokan. Roselia and RAS begin performing their live shows while a zoned-out Rokka comes to terms with her failed RAS audition. Meanwhile, Poppin'Party plays a new song for their first preliminary show in front of Rokka. Motivated by Poppin'Party's song, she quickly rushes to RAS' studio where she is given one last chance to audition. Rokka's passionate performance pleases Chiyu, who adds her as a "(temporary) guitarist" on the terms that she becomes a guitarist worthy of RAS.
30	4	"Them Lil' Octopus Sausages"; Transliteration: "Tako-san Winnā dagiya a" (Japanese: タコさんウインナーだぎやあ)	You Nakano	Yūko Kakihara	You Nakano	February 20, 2020	January 21, 2020
With Rokka becoming the temporary guitarist of Raise A Suilen, the band heads to a film studio to shoot a music video of their new song. Afterwards, they return to the studio to play said song, but Rokka struggles to play together with the other band members. After a chat with Masuki in a ramen shop, Rokka keeps practicing until the song is perfected. The next day, the band is impressed by the video they put together, and Chiyu removes the interim label from Rokka's title, giving her the nickname Lock.
31	5	"PoPi-V!"; Transliteration: "Popibui" (Japanese: ポピブイ)	Haruyo Ogawa	Midori Gotō	Kunihisa Sugishima	February 27, 2020	January 21, 2020
Inspired by Raise A Suilen's music video, Poppin'Party decides to make an MV of their own (dubbed PoPi-V). Taking cues from Pastel Palettes' video and Rokka's testimonies of the video production process, Poppin'Party invites their friends to participate. Rimi and Arisa spend many sleepless days and nights working on the video, which includes photos and videos of the bands. Amazed by the final product, Poppin'Party uploads the video online and are excited by the likes they immediately receive. Later in the night, Chiyu confronts Roselia and proposes a band battle with RAS, which Yukina accepts.
32	6	"This is it."	You Nakano	Yuniko Ayana	Hiroshi Matsuzono	March 5, 2020	March 3, 2020
RAS and Roselia prepare for the band battle at the Dub live house. Although Roselia had been preparing for the Over the Future concert, a precursor event to their ultimate goal Future World Fes, Yukina is adamant about playing in the battle. Roselia guitarist Sayo Hikawa expresses her doubts as she believes her band is overworking themselves by practicing for two events at once. However, after talking to Chiyu and finding out why she wanted to set up RAS, Sayo comes back, intent on beating them. After a vote, RAS wins the band battle with Chiyu proclaiming her band is better.
33	7	"Save Them In The Music"; Transliteration: "Oto ni nokoshite okitakute" (Japanese: 音に残しておきたくて)	Naruyo Takahashi	Hitomi Ogawa	Toshiyuki Fujisawa	March 12, 2020	March 3, 2020
Reeling after their defeat, Roselia reflect upon their performance and prepare for Over the Future. Sayo practices intensely for the concert but collapses during a break from practice due to overwork and fever. As she recuperates in her bedroom, her bandmates visit and Yukina chats with her about why she accepted the band battle challenge: to learn from RAS and grow as a band. After Sayo's recovery and one last practice session, Roselia performs at Over the Future; Yukina thanks the fans for their ongoing support before starting their performance.
34	8	"Should We Be Lounging Around Right Now?"; Transliteration: "Nonbiri shite ite yoi no deshou ka?" (Japanese: のんびりしていてよいのでしょうか)	You Nakano	Midori Gotō	You Nakano	March 19, 2020	March 10, 2020
All the old shopkeepers from the Jizo-dori shopping district break their backs just before their trip to the hot springs, so everyone (except Chiyu and PAREO) go in their place. After settling into their rooms, the girls socialize with their peers from other bands. In particular, Rei and Kasumi meet, where they praise each other's performances as RAS and Poppin'Party respectively. Others relax in the hot springs, though some like Arisa and Yukina end up overheating from staying for too long. During the evening, Afterglow informs Kasumi and the others that Poppin'Party's music video gained over 10,000 views, which they celebrate before tending to the overheated.
35	9	"Let's Go, PoPiPa"; Transliteration: "Iku zo popipa" (Japanese: いくぞポピパ)	Hiroshi Morita	Yasuhiro Nakanishi	Naruyo Takahashi	March 26, 2020	March 10, 2020
Hoping to gain more votes, Poppin'Party plans a three-week schedule of live performances. In addition to Galaxy, they play at CiRCLE and Dub alongside Roselia and RAS, respectively; although they receive fewer votes than both bands, they enjoy their newly-gained momentum as they reach sixth in the polls. Although RAS offers their support to Poppin'Party, including baking a cake for Tae's birthday, they fall behind Roselia in the voting. In response, Chiyu calls an impromptu meeting in which she announces that RAS will play in other venues to force other bands to withdraw. She also takes control of everyone's calendars and instructs the band members to follow her orders and to not socialize with other bands. After an argument where Chiyu questions everyone's commitment to RAS, an incensed Masuki walks away. PAREO attempts to console Chiyu but is rebuked and deemed useless.
36	10	"Vocalists are... Like Stars..."; Transliteration: "Bōkaru wa...... Hoshi..." (Japanese: ボーカルは。。。。。。星。。。)	Yasunori Gotō	Midori Gotō	Junichi Sakata	April 2, 2020	March 17, 2020
Worried about her band's future, Rokka looks for Masuki but to no avail. The next day, after receiving advice from Kasumi, Rokka searches for her again, finally finding her at her school. Meeting in front of the Budokan, Rokka praises Masuki for helping her and tells her to meet with Chiyu to make up. Meanwhile, Rei meets Tae and ponders about her feelings toward RAS; Tae tells her that as the vocalist of RAS, she has the power to change what her band will do in the future. RAS, sans PAREO, reunite as a band to perform, but feel anxious and distracted due to her absence and do not perform well. While Rokka and Masking head to Chiba to find her, Rei talks to Chiyu about needing to work together in the best interests of the band. After finding out that Chiyu wrote PAREO off for being useless, the two also head out together to find her.
37	11	"Pareo No Longer Exists"; Transliteration: "Pareo wa Mō Imasen" (Japanese: パレオはもういません)	You Nakano	Yuniko Ayana	Toshihiko Masuda	April 9, 2020	March 17, 2020
In Chiba, Masking and Rokka search for PAREO by visiting her school. When they show her classmates a photo of her, they learn of PAREO's true identity as Reona Nyūbara. The two spot Reona as she is walking home, prompting her to run away and them to give chase. Upon catching up to her, they learn of her background as an academically successful but meek girl who regularly posts keyboard covers of Pastel Palettes songs online. Despite Rokka and Masuki's efforts, a disillusioned Reona proclaims PAREO no longer exists until she spots Chiyu and Rei running up to them. After Chiyu asks for forgiveness and is accepted, the band performs a song for her birthday back in the studio. Eventually, the Girls Band Challenge voting closes with Roselia leading, while Poppin'Party and RAS are tied for second.
38	12	"A Concert With Popipa!"; Transliteration: "Popipa-san to Kyōen ya!" (Japanese: ポピパさんと共演や一一一一一一！)	Naruyo Takahashi	Yasuhiro Nakanishi	Naruyo Takahashi	April 16, 2020	April 7, 2020
Bringing Poppin'Party and RAS together at Galaxy, Marina announces that both bands will proceed to the finals at the Budokan, to everyone's relief and excitement. Each band then prepares to perform in the Budokan which includes a dress rehearsal at CiRCLE. Along the way, Poppin'Party prepares a new song that they want to play with Roselia and RAS, both of whom accept. Meanwhile, Asuka volunteers to help in the Girls Band Challenge, including creating a poster for the finals and interviewing the bands for her blog. The night before the finals, Kasumi sees Asuka proofreading her blog post. Asked to explain how she finds sparkling, heart-pounding moments in her life, Kasumi recounts how she found these moments by forming Poppin'Party and meeting and making new friends over the past year.
39	13	"This... This Right Here is the Girl Band Generation!"; Transliteration: "Kore ga... Kore ga Koso ga, Dai Gāruzu Bando Jidai ya!" (Japanese: これが。。。これこそが、大ガールズバンド時代や！)	Kōdai Kakimoto	Hitomi Ogawa	Naruyo Takahashi	April 23, 2020	April 7, 2020
The Girls Band Challenge finals arrive as Poppin'Party, RAS, and Roselia assemble at the Budokan, where they help set up the stage. Before Poppin'Party's performance, Rimi confides to her band that she is hesitant to play as the finals symbolize the end of their journey up to that point. However, she and the band are uplifted when they hear the crowd recite their pre-performance chant. Poppin'Party and Roselia perform new songs, while RAS play a rendition of Chiyu's birthday song. The audience votes for the winner, with Roselia claiming the Grand Prize; to the others' surprise, RAS receives the Best Performance title while Poppin'Party is named Best Band. The three bands close out the event by playing their collaboration song.

=== Spin-off series ===
==== Morfonication (2022) ====
No.	Title	Original release date
1	"Summer Morfonica Plan"; Transliteration: "Natsu Monika Keikaku" (Japanese: 夏モニカ計画)	July 28, 2022
With summer break nearing, Mashiro attempts to write a summer-themed song after daydreaming of sea creatures and seeing a butterfly that follows her. Tōko proposes organizing a special summer event with Nanami and Tsukushi as her accomplices, and the latter suggests a training camp on Tsukinomori's campus. Mashiro encounters her middle school classmates; she musters the confidence to talk after spotting the butterfly, but when the classmates recall her doing the same in middle school, she runs away. After abruptly departing a practice session, Mashiro notices the butterfly and her surrounding world blurring and turning to black.
2	"Shining days"	July 29, 2022
After summer break begins, Morfonica attempts to talk to Mashiro but fails. Tōko and Tsukushi drag her from her house to Tsukinomori for the training camp to help her write the song, but she hesitates and calls her daydreaming childish. After exploring the campus, an inspired Mashiro resumes writing lyrics before her darker thoughts frighten her into stopping. Despite Mashiro snapping at her bandmates and leaving the camp, the others bring her out to play with fireworks. Mashiro reveals her lyrics come from her daydreams, but the conversation with her classmates made her believe she has not matured since; Nanami theorizes she had misinterpreted the classmates' comments, and she and Tsukushi agree they appreciate her regardless of her self-improvement. Touched by their words, Mashiro's colorful daydreams return and inspire her to complete the song "Yorube no Sunny, Sunny".

==== BanG Dream! It's MyGO!!!!! (2023) ====
No.	Title (Note: All English titles are taken from Crunchyroll.)	Directed by	Written by	Storyboarded by	Original release date
1	"Haneoka's Quirky Girl"; Transliteration: "Haneoka no Fushigi-chan" (Japanese: 羽丘の不思議ちゃん)	Motomu Endō	Yuniko Ayana	Kōdai Kakimoto	June 29, 2023
2	"I Won't Invite You Anymore"; Transliteration: "Mō Sasowanai" (Japanese: もう誘わない)	Motomu Endō	Midori Gotō	Tomomi Umetsu	June 29, 2023
3	"Crychic"	Daichi Ōmori & Hajime Yamanokuchi	Yuniko Ayana	Kōdai Kakimoto	June 29, 2023
4	"For Our Whole Lives?!"; Transliteration: "Isshō da yo!?" (Japanese: 一生だよ！？)	Kōichirō Koga	Hitomi Ogawa	Shouko Hayashi	July 6, 2023
5	"I'm Not Running Away!"; Transliteration: "Nigetenai!" (Japanese: 逃げてない！)	Daichi Ōmori	Akiko Waba	Hiroshi Morita	July 13, 2023
6	"Why, When It's Too Late"; Transliteration: "Nande Imasara" (Japanese: なんで今更)	Kōichirō Koga	Midori Gotō	Kozue Oka	July 20, 2023
7	"Even After Today's Concert Ends"; Transliteration: "Kyō no Raibu ga Owatte mo" (Japanese: 今日のライブが終わっても)	Tomomi Umetsu	Yuniko Ayana	Tomomi Umetsu	July 27, 2023
8	"Why"; Transliteration: "Dōshite" (Japanese: どうして)	Kōichirō Koga	Hitomi Ogawa	Hiroshi Morita	August 3, 2023
9	"Disbanding"; Transliteration: "Kaisan" (Japanese: 解散)	Motomu Endō	Akiko Waba	Naoya Okugawa	August 10, 2023
10	"Always Lost"; Transliteration: "Zutto Maigo" (Japanese: ずっと迷子)	Tomomi Umetsu	Midori Gotō	Tomomi Umetsu	August 17, 2023
11	"Even So"; Transliteration: "Soredemo" (Japanese: それでも)	Kōichirō Koga	Hitomi Ogawa	Hiroshi Morita	August 24, 2023
12	"It's my go!!!!!"	Shouko Hayashi	Akiko Waba	Daichi Ōmori	August 31, 2023
13	"The Only One I Can Trust Is Myself"; Transliteration: "Shinjirareru no ha Waga Mi Hitotsu" (Japanese: 信じられるのは我が身ひとつ)	Hajime Yamanokuchi	Yuniko Ayana	Naoya Okugawa	September 14, 2023

==== BanG Dream! Ave Mujica (2025) ====
No.	Title	Directed by	Written by	Storyboarded by	Original release date
1	"Sub rosa."	Kōichirō Koga	Midori Gotō & Yuniko Ayana	Naoya Okugawa	January 2, 2025 (Note: This episode held a simultaneous global debut in both Tokyo and at Anime Festival Asia in Singapore on December 1, 2024.)
2	"Exitus acta probat."	Daisuke Suzuki	Akiko Waba	Tomomi Umetsu	January 9, 2025
3	"Quid faciam?"	Hajime Yamanokuchi	Hitomi Ogawa	Kozue Oka	January 16, 2025
4	"Acta est fabula."	Hiroshi Morita	Midori Gotō	Hiroshi Morita	January 23, 2025
5	"Facta fugis, facienda petis."	Daichi Ōmori	Tani Haruhi	Daichi Ōmori & Daisuke Suzuki	January 30, 2025
6	"Animum reges."	Kōichirō Koga	Akiko Waba	Naoya Okugawa	February 6, 2025
7	"Post nubila Phoebus."	Daisuke Suzuki	Hitomi Ogawa	Kozue Oka	February 13, 2025
8	"Belua multorum es capitums."	Hiroshi Morita	Midori Gotō	Hiroshi Morita	February 20, 2025
9	"Ne vivam si abis."	Daichi Ōmori	Akiko Waba	Tomomi Umetsu	February 27, 2025
10	"Odi et amo."	Kōichirō Koga	Tani Haruhi	Naoya Okugawa	March 6, 2025
11	"Te ustus amem."	Hajime Yamanokuchi	Midori Gotō	Hajime Yamanokuchi, Kozue Oka, & Kōdai Kakimoto	March 13, 2025
12	"Fluctuat nec mergitur."	Daichi Ōmori	Yuniko Ayana	Kozue Oka	March 20, 2025
13	"Per aspera ad astra."	Hajime Yamanokuchi	Hitomi Ogawa	Hiroshi Morita & Kozue Oka	March 27, 2025

==== BanG Dream! Yume∞Mita (2026) ====
No.	Title	Directed by	Written by	Storyboarded by	Original release date
1	"MewType"; Transliteration: "Myūtaipu" (Japanese: みゅーたいぷ)	Hiroshi Morita	Midori Gotō	Tomomi Umetsu	July 2, 2026
At a virtual world, Arale Nakamachi, Nonoka Miyanaga, Miyako Fuji, and Yuno Sengoku are arranged into the virtual band MewType by their manager, much to their confusion and surprise. Arale is hesitant to become the band's vocalist as she also learns her bandmates are notable Internet personalities. After attending her first day at high school and joining MewType's first band practice, Arale encounters her former friends Viola and Ritsu Minetsuki. Viola voices knowledge of Arale's new band and reveals she and Ritsu have also formed their own group named Fairy Bouquet, though a guilt-ridden Arale remains evasive and runs away, leaving Ritsu concerned for her wellbeing.
2	"Smooch!"; Transliteration: "Chu~" (Japanese: ちゅ～)	Naoto Uchida	Midori Gotō	Tomomi Umetsu	July 2, 2026
Arale recalls being bandmates with Viola and Ritsu in La La La La Girls, which fell apart after a leaked recording of Arale being a rude and insensitive member circulated and an online smear campaign targeting her ensued. MewType becomes embroiled in controversy after Nonoka's comment on caring for the weary Miyako, who also works as a manga artist, was misinterpreted as an insult. When they see Miyako continue to tire herself out despite resolving the situation, Nonoka and Arale cheer up Miyako and ease her predicament. Arale expresses her admiration for Miyako's work before running away in embarrassment. Seeing this, Miyako gifts a flustered Arale merchandise of their favorite anime as gratitude and befriends her and Nonoka.
3	"Suit Yourself!"; Transliteration: "Suki ni Shiro" (Japanese: すきにしろ)	Takumi Miyata	Yotsuji Haibuchi	Kozue Oka	July 2, 2026
Yuno declares to the band manager that she treats her commitment to MewType as business. Arale, Nonoka, and Miyako discuss Yuno's lack of passion, resulting in them assuming that Yuno is actually an emotionless robot. Sometime later, Ritsu crosses paths with Yuno. Ritsu confides in Yuno on her complicated friendship with Arale, and Yuno states she should not be burdened by her past and try to make amends. As MewType prepares to release a cover song, Arale gains the confidence to become their vocalist when their manager remarks she can conceal her identity. Yuno also admits to MewType that she has difficulty understanding people. Meanwhile, Ritsu musters the strength to see Arale at her school, only for Viola to confront her. Viola threatens Ritsu into silence by revealing she was responsible for the leaked recording and proclaiming she can ruin Arale's new career in MewType, demoralizing Ritsu.
4	"Might Be Fun"; Transliteration: "Tanoshī Kamo" (Japanese: たのしいかも)	Hiroshi Morita	Akiko Waba	Kenta Sasaki & Kozue Oka	July 9, 2026
While MewType finishes and uploads their cover song to the excitement of Arale, Ritsu remains disturbed by Viola's threat. Viola manipulates her into believing that Arale no longer needs her upon seeing MewType's song, further discomforting Ritsu. She then remembers how she admired Arale and joined her and Viola at La La La La Girls to change her shyness and follow Arale's lead. Unbeknownst to Arale and Ritsu, a spiteful Viola subtly ousted the band's senior leader and succeeded her. Viola later used Arale's passion to maliciously frame her as an unruly member and manipulated Ritsu to not take her side, causing Arale's trauma. Ritsu expressed immense regret for failing Arale, as Viola tells her of Fairy Bouquet's upcoming debut. Ritsu encounters Arale again and tries to apologize, but a traumatized Arale pushes her away.
5	"Help"; Transliteration: "Tasukete" (Japanese: たすけて)	Naoto Uchida	Midori Gotō	Tomomi Umetsu	July 16, 2026
Arale begins avoiding band practice, worrying Nonoka and the rest of MewType. Ritsu continues to feel despair under Viola, causing her to play one of Arale's songs and yearn for her presence during a livestream meant to promote Fairy Bouquet. Viola gleefully uses this to blackmail a distraught Ritsu, as Arale is informed by Yuno of the stream and realizes Ritsu's calls for help. Arale later unknowingly arrives at Fairy Bouquet's debut event. Upon spotting Arale, Viola publicly exposes her past with La La La La Girls and brings her onstage. Viola demands Arale and Ritsu to reconcile in front of a large crowd for her own gain, but a panicking Arale drags Ritsu away from the event to Viola's shock. Arale discloses on her fears for her new career, prompting a grateful Ritsu to declare her desire to help her in getting through their fears together.
6	"Destiny"; Transliteration: "Unmei" (Japanese: うんめい)	Takumi Miyata	Midori Gotō	Kenta Sasaki	July 23, 2026
Arale apologizes to the band manager and MewType on her recklessness. Upon seeing Viola manipulate the narrative and remembering how she was scouted for MewType, Arale strengthens her resolve to face her fears. She also congratulates Miyako on the release of her new manga, during which Miyako eavesdrops on Arale's dilemma. Miyako becomes concerned for Arale when she repeatedly encounters Viola, who states she is one of her fans. Viola quickly charms the naive and praise-hungry Miyako by profiling and relating to her resentment towards highly talented individuals and desire to be acknowledged, further goading Miyako to conduct an Internet live show with MewType. Sometime later, the manager inducts Ritsu to the band following an arrangement with Fairy Bouquet, which Arale recognizes as part of Viola's ploy. Miyako forwards Viola's suggestion and Arale unknowingly supports it to provide an explanation for Ritsu's transfer, though Yuno and the manager worry that the move would incite controversy.
7	"Turning Over a New Leaf"; Transliteration: "Kokoro Arata ni" (Japanese: こころあらたに)	Tomoko Nezu & Daichi Ōmori	Akiko Waba	Hiroshi Morita & Motomu Endō	July 30, 2026
Despite their initial hesitation and trolls vandalizing the livestream, MewType conducts their live show which becomes a success. The band celebrates their first show together, and Arale thanks Miyako for suggesting it. Miyako voices joy at finally being acknowledged, only to see comments criticizing the live show as a selfish action done by Arale. As backlash begins to mount on MewType, a confused and distraught Miyako asks Arale on their current predicament. Arale tries to explain the situation until they are visited by Viola. Arale enters an emotional outburst on not falling for Viola's lies, which Viola uses to appear hurt by Arale's words. Miyako, who remains unaware of Arale and Viola's hostilities, defends Viola and reveals she suggested the live show, much to Arale's shock. Viola runs away and malevolently laughs at having secretly recorded Arale's outburst. Arale is left troubled by the encounter as Ritsu transfers to her school and becomes her classmate to protect her.
8	"Gold Star"; Transliteration: "Hanamaru" (Japanese: はなまる)	Naoto Uchida	Yotsuji Haibuchi	Kenta Sasaki	August 6, 2026
In a flashback, Ritsu expresses to her previous school's administration of wanting to quit Fairy Bouquet. A deceitful Viola takes accountability and arranges Ritsu's transfer to MewType, secretly wishing to see more drama. In the present, Nonoka, Arale, and a distant Miyako welcome Ritsu to the band. Arale and Ritsu discuss Viola's manipulation of Miyako and agree to give her space. Meanwhile, Miyako remains bothered at MewType ignoring the recent backlash as her bandmates ask her to improve her playing during practice and her manga editors tell her to take a break, further exacerbating her anxieties. Nonoka repeatedly attempts to cheer up a fatigued Miyako, causing Miyako to snap and lash out at Nonoka for maintaining positivity despite their problems. Arale and Ritsu try to defuse the situation when Yuno announces her immediate departure from MewType.
9	"Disbandment"; Transliteration: "Kaisan" (Japanese: かいさん)	Takumi Miyata	Akiko Waba	Kenta Sasaki, Kotaro Kobayashi & Hiroshi Morita	August 13, 2026
With MewType's dynamics in jeopardy, the band's manager tries to cheer them up with the announcement of their first collaboration. Nonoka confides in Yuno on her perceived flaws as she researches on Yuno's former band and wonders what happened in her past. Yuno becomes reclusive from MewType and vents her frustrations online, prompting the band members to discuss the situation. A guilty Miyako shoulders blame for their fallout and criticizes Arale's efforts to improve band morale before leaving ahead. As Arale, Ritsu, and Nonoka try to locate Yuno, Miyako meets with Viola. Miyako voices to Viola on her grievances towards Arale's optimism, unaware that Viola is recording their exchange. Ritsu later confronts Miyako to warn her on Viola's manipulation tactics, forcing a conflicted Miyako to question herself.
10	"Sea"; Transliteration: "Umi" (Japanese: うみ)	Takumi Miyata	Midori Gotō	Tomomi Umetsu	August 20, 2026
Nonoka recalls bringing joy to her peers despite feeling lonely. Upon learning that Yuno, whom she idolized, would be joining MewType, Nonoka joined the band as well to follow her. After the band's fallout, Nonoka is informed by Arale and Ritsu of Yuno's whereabouts through her personal private account. Nonoka finds Yuno at a campfire and asks her to return, but Yuno reiterates they are no longer bandmates. Nonoka stubbornly tries to change her mind, as Arale, Ritsu, and Miyako also join them. Yuno voices her disdain for fake friendships, revealing that she felt let down by her former band Supremacy for not taking their dream of achieving success seriously before disbanding. She apologizes for treating MewType as a business, and Nonoka lifts the band's spirits by conducting an impromptu practice session. Nonoka declares her desire to have MewType continue on, allowing Yuno to loosen up.
11	"That Was Fun"; Transliteration: "Tanoshikatta" (Japanese: たのしかった)	Hitomi Ogawa	Midori Gotō	Kayoko Ezoe	August 27, 2026
After mending her relationship with MewType, Yuno reunites with Supremacy bandmate Koharu. Yuno learns from Koharu that her ambitious drive inspired their bandmates in passionately pursuing their own dreams, with Koharu also sharing her joy to work with Yuno again for the MewType collaboration. Realizing her bandmates in Supremacy still cared for her, Yuno is reinvigorated to continue work on the collaboration's composition. Later on, Viola circulates the fabricated video of Arale and Miyako arguing to stir controversy towards MewType. Arale, Ritsu, Nonoka, and Yuno disregard the backlash, though Arale and Ritsu worry for Miyako. A distressed Miyako confronts the reality of Viola's manipulative behavior upon confirming Viola's involvement, leaving her in tears. MewType discusses their upcoming work for Yuno's song at school and see a disheveled Miyako arrive. Miyako apologizes in spite of the girls assuring she was innocent, and becomes determined to settle her flaws and shortcomings.
12	"Goodbye"; Transliteration: "Wakare" (Japanese: わかれ)	Takumi Miyata	Midori Gotō	Tomomi Umetsu	September 3, 2026
Arale and MewType organize a public live show in the face of numerous controversies. Arale volunteers to write lyrics reflecting on the events that transpired, which MewType supports. Upon seeing her bandmates work together as a unit and make peace with their past, Miyako privately asks Viola for them to meet. Miyako shares her dismay at Viola deceiving her, even as Viola admits her shared feelings are genuine. Miyako points out Viola's decision to leak the video despite achieving enough popularity on her own merits and her disingenuous disposition, further asserting she has found her own confidence and passion through her creative work. Viola pleads Miyako to stay with her, but Miyako decides to remain with MewType and its flawed members. Miyako swiftly leaves Viola, finally making peace with her troubles.
13	"Mugendai MewType"; Transliteration: "Mugendai Myūtaipu" (Japanese: 夢限大みゅーたいぷ)	Hitomi Ogawa	Midori Gotō	Kenta Sasaki & Tomomi Umetsu	September 10, 2026
In the lead-up to the live show, Ritsu suggests on turning Arale's personal introspective notes into a song to improve public perception, allowing their former bandmates from La La La La Girls to attest Arale's innocence. Elsewhere, Viola's Fairy Bouquet bandmates criticize her obsession of ruining Arale. Viola slyly reveals that their contracts have been terminated, though she adds on still having value. A lonely Viola then contemplates on feeling inferior to Arale's genuine charisma and resorting to maintaining a fake personality to be acknowledged. On the day of MewType's live show, Arale's nervousness is eased by her bandmates, and they rename themselves as Mugendai MewType to reflect their continuing change. Mugendai MewType gallantly performs their set, while a resentful Viola watches Arale move on from her past. Mugendai MewType prepares for their national tour as a follow-up to their successful live show, and the band gleefully discusses their future plans.

== Films ==
No.	Title (Note: All English titles are taken from Crunchyroll (All movies) and HIDIVE (Only in Film Live).)	Original release date
Film	"BanG Dream! Film Live"; Transliteration: "Bandori! Firumu Raibu" (Japanese: バンドリ! フィルムライブ)	September 13, 2019
Poppin'Party, Afterglow, Pastel Palettes, Roselia, and Hello, Happy World! perform in a live outdoor concert.
Film	"BanG Dream! Episode of Roselia I: Promise"; Transliteration: "Bandori! Episōdo of Roselia I: Yakusoku" (Japanese: BanG Dream! Episode of Roselia I: 約束)	April 23, 2021
Despite their childhood friendship, Yukina and Lisa have grown distant as the former pursues music with the hope of redeeming her father who quit the industry in disgrace after being unable to create his own music and having to sell out. She recruits Sayo, Lisa, Ako, and Rinko to form Roselia, and the five develop a camaraderie with each other as they aim to perform at the prestigious Future World Fes. However, a poor performance at the Sweet Music Shower prompts Yukina to revert to her original harsh attitude, resulting in an argument with Ako and Rinko. While Yukina receives motivation from Poppin'Party after attending a show, the other four express their love for the band and make amends. Following a successful concert, Lisa ponders her role in the band and attempts to write lyrics elaborating on her feelings. After Yukina rejects her initial draft, Lisa recalls her youth with Yukina and writes new lyrics, which Yukina sings and proclaims will be played by the band at their next show. The movie follows Roselia's two Band Stories and first "Noble Rose" event story from the BanG Dream! Girls Band Party! game.
Film	"BanG Dream! Episode of Roselia II: Song I am"	June 25, 2021
As Roselia prepares for the qualifying concert for Future World Fes, Rinko writes a new song that Ako urges her to turn into an actual piece. Despite her enthusiasm for the event, Ako is uneasy about Roselia's future following FWF. When she voices her concerns the day prior to the show, the others reassure her by explaining that although FWF is the band's closest immediate goal, the uncertainty of the future presents more heights for them to pursue. At the qualifiers, Roselia performs Lisa's and Rinko's songs and ultimately win. Ahead of FWF, Yukina pens a song that draws comparisons to "Louder", which her father had written and was co-opted by Roselia as a trademark of its discography, prompting her to declare FWF would be the final time it is performed as it represents the past. At FWF, Roselia also plays "Neo-Aspect", which symbolizes the present, and the new track "Song I am.", highlighting the future. After the show, Yukina thanks her father for supporting her career, and he gives his best wishes for the band's future endeavors. The movie follows the second and third "Noble Rose" event stories from Girls Band Party!
Film	"BanG Dream! Film Live 2nd Stage"	August 20, 2021
The original five bands, joined by Raise A Suilen and Morfonica, perform in a larger arena. Depending on the version that the viewer watches, the collaboration song in the post-credits scene varies: Poppin'Party, Pastel Palettes, and Morfonica play "Kizunairo no Ensemble" together; "Kyouen Red x Violet" is a joint piece between Roselia and Afterglow; and "Rasha People!" is between Hello, Happy World! and Raise A Suilen.
Film	"BanG Dream! Poppin'Dream!"	January 1, 2022
After the Girls Band Challenge finals, the participating bands are invited by Sora Uzaki, a friend of Masuki's parents, to the Save the Dream charity concert at Paseo Stadium in Guam; Poppin'Party and Raise A Suilen accept the offer, while Roselia turns it down as they are focusing on Future World Fes. Upon arriving, a delay in Poppin'Party getting their luggage results in their hotel-bound bus leaving with just RAS. While RAS encounters and spends time with Morfonica, who is also playing at the show, Poppin'Party is picked up by a festival staffer and brought to Governor Joseph Flores Beach Park, where they host an acoustic jam session. Emotional from the performance, Masuki goes to the beach with Tsukushi watching, but sprains her foot when she steps on a sea cucumber. She hides her injury on the day of the show before being spotted by Sāya, who takes her to a nearby hospital. Morfonica agrees to perform first to stall until Masuki and Sāya return, and the former arrives in time for RAS' final song. During Poppin'Party's closing act, the stadium lights shut off and the crowd revels in the starry sky akin to what Kasumi saw when she discovered the Star Beat. In a post-credits scene, Sora sends off Poppin'Party and RAS, adding she is open to bringing them back for future performances.

== Other series ==
=== Pastel Life (2018) ===
No.	Original release date
1	May 17, 2018
While taking a break from practice, Aya and Chisato visit the shopping mall to buy headphones. Due to their celebrity status, they decide to wear disguises, though Aya is quickly recognized.
2	May 24, 2018
Maya and Eve notice a magazine article covering Hina's acting debut. Hina presents Chisato with the read-through for the film as she doesn't understand the younger sister character she has to play, to the band's confusion considering her actual sibling relationship with Sayo. Chisato provides tips to help her, but she still fails to realize.
3	May 31, 2018
Chisato abruptly leaves Pastel Palettes' practice for other obligations, which raises suspicion from Hina as her television show had already finished filming. Before she leaves with the band, Hina spots a bag of cookies that she bluntly criticizes. On their way to lunch, they encounter a dog that Chisato reveals to be hers; she explains her sudden departures have been to spend time with him, while the cookies were intended for the dog.
4	June 7, 2018
After arriving early for practice, Maya is testing the band's equipment when she notices small gaps in the room that she decides to squeeze between. While laying below a couch, the rest of the band arrive, with the situation being exacerbated when they sit on said couch. When she drops her pen, Chisato discovers Maya underneath.
5	June 14, 2018
Eve's face becomes masculine after an excessive effort into preparing for an interview with a samurai magazine. Aya's initial attempt to stretch her face fails, prompting Hina to use her "ultimate technique": a group tickle. However, the tickling causes Eve to laugh too much, leading to her face molding into such an expression.
6	June 21, 2018
During a Pastel Palettes concert, Hina's guitar string snaps and technical problems plague the performance; regardless, Aya continues to sing and amaze the crowd. As it turns out, it was merely a dream Hina had, which she promptly proclaims is too boring. Although Aya argues otherwise, the band agrees they enjoy her the way she is.

=== Circle Thanks Party! (2022) ===
No.	Title	Original release date
1	"BanG Dream! Girls Band Party! 5th Anniversary Animation: Circle Thanks Party! #1"	March 10, 2022
Marina suggests hosting a thank-you party for CiRCLE supporters, which the seven bands agree to join. While Chiyu writes a song that everyone will perform together, the girls discuss how they would practice and contribute to the party, as well as how music has changed them: Poppin'Party plans to sell themed chocolate cornets; Masuki and Rokka reflect on their personal growths since joining Raise A Suilen while Tae and Rei express their gratitude for reuniting; and Sayo and Hina, both of whom have professional obligations preventing them from practicing the song with the others, promise to have their bands play together in the future. After submitting their lyrics to Chiyu, the girls go to CiRCLE, where an outdoor stage has been constructed, and help set up for the event by painting its logo, advertising, and create teru teru bōzu of themselves in response to rain being forecasted. On the day before the show, Pastel Palettes and Roselia arrive in time to hold a joint rehearsal with everyone. As they rehearse, raindrops begin to fall.
2	"BanG Dream! Girls Band Party! 5th Anniversary Animation: Circle Thanks Party! #2"	March 17, 2022
A powerful overnight storm damages the stage and its centerpiece logo. Despite being crushed, the girls resolve to repair the stage along with rehearsing. The bands rotate between practicing with Chiyu, cleaning up the stage, and setting up booths for the festival. The event begins with Hello, Happy World! performing tricks before participating in Morfonica's ring toss carnival game, Poppin'Party and Afterglow respectively operating a bakery and café, Pastel Palettes running a photo booth, and the others continuing work on the stage. At nightfall, the girls perform their collaboration song, to the delight of the crowd. As the performance ends, Marina commends the bands and her fellow staff member (the player character in Girls Band Party!) for their hard work.

=== Ganso! BanG Dream! Chan (2025–26) ===
No.	Title	Original release date
1	"GANSO! BanG Dream! Chan"; Transliteration: "Ganso! Bandori-chan" (Japanese: 元祖！バンドリちゃん)	October 2, 2025
The vocalists of each band join forces to defeat an apocalyptic being emanating an evil aura.
2	"Bright Red Sports Car"; Transliteration: "Makkana Supōtsukā" (Japanese: 真っ赤なスポーツカー)	October 9, 2025
Kasumi shares to Poppin'Party! a dream of her breaking up with Arisa, flustering the latter as their bandmates note the dream reinforces their close bond.
3	"The Same Place as Always"; Transliteration: "Itsumo Tōri no Ibasho" (Japanese: いつも通りの居場所)	October 16, 2025
Afterglow relaxes at Haneoka's rooftop, which has been converted into their personal living room, to reminisce on their strong friendships and formation as a band.
4	"The Girl That Can Tell"; Transliteration: "Chigai no Wakaru Onnanoko" (Japanese: 違いのわかる女の子)	October 23, 2025
Tomori shares to MyGO!!!!! the rocks she has been collecting, though Anon and Taki become confused at the similarity of each rock.
5	"Hello Happy Regular Meeting"; Transliteration: "Harohapi Teirei MTG" (Japanese: ハロハピ定例MTG)	October 30, 2025
Hello, Happy World! discusses on the theme of their next live show. Misaki's Michelle costume falls down while pointing upwards, leading Kokoro to decide on performing during a space shuttle takeoff.
6	"As Professionals"; Transliteration: "Puro toshite" (Japanese: プロとして)	November 6, 2025
Roselia points out each of their shortcomings following a gig in their quest to become professionals, before heading out to eat at a restaurant.
7	"Emergence ~ growth ~"; Transliteration: "Uka ～growth～" (Japanese: 「羽化～growth～」)	November 13, 2025
Morfonica finds Mashiro encased in a cocoon following a writer's block, so the band assures her not to worry. Mashiro prematurely breaks from the cocoon in a daze, horrifying the band except the stoic Rui.
8	"Pastel Ludo"; Transliteration: "Pasuteru su Goroku" (Japanese: パステルすごろく)	November 20, 2025
Aya and Chisato take part in a game of ludo around Japan as part of a Pastel Palettes concert, and they perform at Jigokudani Monkey Park after landing a bad roll.
9	"RAISE-A-FIRE"	November 27, 2025
RAS finds themselves at a campsite instead of a meeting form, prompting the band to serve food to several passersby while conducting an impromptu concert.
10	"Minna na cayosi."	December 4, 2025
Uika practices her tongue clicks for a song, causing her to unintentionally inconvenience and perturb each member of Ave Mujica.
11	"DOKIDOKI ☆ To Whom It May Concern"; Transliteration: "Dokidoki ☆ Kankeisha Aisatsu" (Japanese: どきどき☆関係者挨拶)	December 11, 2025
Anon and Taki visit Afterglow's afterparty to congratulate them, though a bashful Taki, who is a fervent Afterglow fan, fumbles her congratulatory remarks.
12	"Stargaze"; Transliteration: "Tentai Kansoku" (Japanese: 天体観測)	December 18, 2025
Kasumi, Hina, Kokoro, Tomori, and Uika go stargazing at a field when a UFO suddenly abducts Uika. She is then brought back to Earth, though with an alien antenna sticking from her head.
13	"Christmas Eve"; Transliteration: "Ivusanta ga Yattekuru" (Japanese: イヴサンタがやってくる)	December 25, 2025
Eve, Maya, Hagumi, and Rui go around town delivering presents for Christmas, during which they drop by Tsukushi's house and gift her a bonsai plant.
14	"New Year with Everyone"; Transliteration: "Minna de Oshōgatsu" (Japanese: みんなでお正月)	January 8, 2026
Poppin'Party! hosts a New Year party at Arisa's house and enjoys their time together.
15	"Vroom Vroom Bike, Let's Go"; Transliteration: "Bunbun Baiku de Gō" (Japanese: ブンブンバイクでゴー)	January 15, 2026
Rokka and Masuki travel a post-apocalyptic world on Masuki's motorbike to buy a sweet potato.
16	"Exciting! Travel Prep"; Transliteration: "Wakuwaku! Tabi Junbi" (Japanese: わくわく！旅準備)	January 22, 2026
Aya prepares her luggage for a tropical island photoshoot, but she becomes exasperated after Chisato asks her not to bring anything.
17	"CHU²-P's Charisma Radio"; Transliteration: "Chuchu-P no Karisuma Radio" (Japanese: チュチュPのカリスマラジオ)	January 29, 2026
At a radio show hosted by Chiyu and PAREO, the two girls give suggestions to their listeners (who are actually their RAS bandmates) on tackling their dilemmas.
18	"Special Collab! Nyamuchi Channel"; Transliteration: "Supesharu Korabo! Nyamuchi Channeru" (Japanese: スペシャルコラボ！にゃむちチャンネル)	February 5, 2026
Nyamu collaborates with Lisa and Tōko to selfishly further her own career, only to relent after spending time with the energetic Lisa and Tōko around the city.
19	"Michelle in a Box"; Transliteration: "Hakoiri Missheru" (Japanese: 箱入りミッシェル)	February 12, 2026
Misaki, wearing her Michelle costume, tries to survive a cramped elevator ride to her floor.
20	"Farewell Is Bitter Like Dark Chocolate"; Transliteration: "Tabidachi wa Bitā Chokorēto" (Japanese: 旅立ちはビターチョコレート)	February 19, 2026
Rimi finds herself taking care of a sentient chocolate corone, which she eventually sets free for the corone to reunite with its friends.
21	"BandedIn"; Transliteration: "Baitomī-san" (Japanese: バイトミーさん)	February 26, 2026
Sakiko takes up a job offer to temporarily become Michelle after Misaki suffered an injury. Sakiko enjoys her time playing with Hello, Happy World!, but is saddened to find the job offer no longer available.
22	"One Hundred Tales"; Transliteration: "Hyakumonogatari" (Japanese: 百物語)	March 5, 2026
Rimi, Ran, Moca, Mashiro, and Nanami share several ghost stories and briefly panic after losing their candle.
23	"After School Talk Time"; Transliteration: "Hōkago Tōku Taimu" (Japanese: 放課後トークタイム)	March 12, 2026
Anon discusses various topics with Tomori, Mutsumi, Rui, and Rinko at RiNG before leaving ahead, much to their confusion.
24	"The Drifting Classroom"; Transliteration: "Dorifutingu Kurasurūmu" (Japanese: ドリフティング・クラスルーム)	March 19, 2026
Taki, Uika, and Umiri find themselves stranded at sea with their classroom. As the three girls gradually lose hope, they suddenly find Poppin'Party! also stranded and wanting to conduct band rehearsals.
25	"Udagawa Hypnotic Waves"; Transliteration: "Udagawa Saiminha" (Japanese: 宇田川催眠波)	March 26, 2026
Ako unwittingly hypnotizes Sayo to become her servant, shocking Tomoe as Sayo begins levitating.
26	"Magical Girl Pappy, Muji GO!"; Transliteration: "Mahō Shōjo Pappī Muji Go" (Japanese: 魔法少女パッピームジゴ)	April 2, 2026
Soyo, Aya, and Kanon become magical girls with the help of Mortis to stop a gigantic chicken from destroying the city.
27	"The Kitties of the Day"; Transliteration: "Kyō no Nyān-chan" (Japanese: 今日のにゃーんちゃん)	April 9, 2026
28	"Kappo Kitazawa" (Japanese: 割烹きたざわ)	April 16, 2026
29	"Trials of the Survival Tower"; Transliteration: "Sabaibaru Tawā no Shiren" (Japanese: サバイバルタワーの試練)	April 23, 2026
30	"Can I Make Beef Jerky from It"; Transliteration: "Bīfujākī Dekiru Kana" (Japanese: ビーフジャーキーできるかな)	April 30, 2026
31	"The Same Walk Home as Always"; Transliteration: "Itsumo Tōri no Kaerimichi" (Japanese: いつも通りの帰り道)	May 7, 2026
32	"The Magic Pitch Defeated! Michelle's Do-or-Die Jump!"; Transliteration: "Makyū Yabureru! Missheru Kesshi no Janpu" (Japanese: 魔球敗れる！ミッシェル決死のジャンプ！)	May 14, 2026
33	"Afternoon Time"; Transliteration: "Hirusagari no Gogo" (Japanese: 昼下がりの午後)	May 21, 2026
34	"More Survival"; Transliteration: "Motto Sabaibaru" (Japanese: もっとサバイバル)	May 28, 2026
35	"The Family Diner Girls"; Transliteration: "Famiresu Gāruzu" (Japanese: ファミレス・ガールズ)	June 4, 2026
36	"BanGpardy!"; Transliteration: "Kuizu Kotaete Bandori-chan no Kan" (Japanese: クイズ答えてバンドリちゃんの館)	June 11, 2026
37	"A Meet-up at RiNG"; Transliteration: "RiNG de Machiawase" (Japanese: RiNGで待ち合わせ)	June 18, 2026
38	"Escape from RiNG"; Transliteration: "RiNG Kara no Dasshutsu" (Japanese: RiNGからの脱出)	June 25, 2026
39	"＊＊＊＊＊＊'s Advice Hotline"; Transliteration: "Marumaru no Onayami Sōdanshitsu" (Japanese: ＊＊＊＊＊＊のお悩み相談室)	July 2, 2026
40	"Artist Ranking Choice"; Transliteration: "Ātisuto Kakuzuke Choisu" (Japanese: アーティスト格付けチョイス)	July 9, 2026
41	"Roselia's Intensive Summer Training Camp"; Transliteration: "Roselia Kyōka Natsu Gasshuku" (Japanese: Roselia強化夏合宿)	July 16, 2026
42	"Shorts Shorts Shorts"; Transliteration: "Shōto Shōto Shōto" (Japanese: ショートショートショート)	July 23, 2026
43	"Overslept"; Transliteration: "Nebō Shimashita" (Japanese: 寝坊しました)	July 30, 2026
44	"Our GANSO! BanG Dream Chan"; Transliteration: "Kore wa Ganso! Bandori-chan" (Japanese: これは元祖！バンドリちゃんのあらすじ)	August 6, 2026
45	"MyGO!!!!! at the Shopping Mall"; Transliteration: "Mōru de MyGO!!!!!" (Japanese: モールでMyGO!!!!!)	August 13, 2026
46	"I'm Beaming"; Transliteration: "Bīmu Uchitai" (Japanese: ビーム撃ちたい)	August 20, 2026
47	"Sauna de totonoi."	August 27, 2026
48	"Yako Fujimi Signing Event"; Transliteration: "Yako Fujimi-sensei Sainkai" (Japanese: 富士見夜子先生サイン会)	September 3, 2026
49	"I want to be BIG"; Transliteration: "BIG ni Naritai" (Japanese: BIGになりたい)	September 10, 2026
50	"Mobile Space Battle Princess BanG DOLL"; Transliteration: "Kidō Uchū Senhi Bandōru" (Japanese: 機動宇宙戦妃 バンドール)	September 17, 2026
51	"The Morning Star"; Transliteration: "Ake no Myōjō" (Japanese: 明けの明星)	September 24, 2026
52	"Farewell! BanG Dream Chan"; Transliteration: "Saraba! Bandori-chan" (Japanese: さらば！バンドリちゃん)	October 1, 2026
