= John A. Cruz =

Guamanian politician

Chaka Cruz

Mayor of Hagåtña
- In office January 3, 2005 – January 4, 2025
- Preceded by: Felix Ungacta
- Succeeded by: Michael Gumataotao

Personal details
- Born: John Aguon Cruz; September 13, 1954 (age 70)
- Political party: Republican
- Spouse: Marie Duenas Mendiola

John Aguon "Chaka" Cruz (born September 13, 1954) is a Guamanian politician, retired civil servant, and a member of the Republican Party of Guam. He has held the office of Mayor of Hagåtña, the territory's capital, from 2005 to 2025, when he succeeded longtime, outgoing Mayor Felix Ungacta. Cruz, who was first elected in 2004, has served four full terms as Mayor and was re-elected in November 2020 to a fifth consecutive term.

== Biography ==
=== Early and personal life ===
Cruz was born on September 13, 1954, to parents, Teresa Aguon Cruz and Francisco Taijeron Cruz. He was raised in nearby Anigua, Guam, and graduated from John F. Kennedy High School in Tamuning in 1972. Cruz married Marie Duenas Mendiola, with whom he has three children, Mia Janelle, Jonathan and Jude. His father-in-law, the late Thomas Flores Mendiola, served as the Commissioner of Agana (the predecessor office of the present-day Mayor of Hagåtña) from 1973 until 1981.

=== Career ===
Cruz worked for the Government of Guam for approximately 25 years until his retirement in 1996.

John A. Cruz was first elected Mayor of Hagåtña in November 2004 and took office in 2005, succeeding outgoing Mayor Felix Ungacta. He won re-election in 2008, 2012, 2016, and 2020.

During his tenure as mayor, Cruz has overseen the completion of a series of flood mitigation projects by FEMA, repairs to the Hagåtña Bridge, and the opening of the Guam Museum. He also relocated the mayor's office to the former Guam Mass Transit Authority (GMTA) building.

Cruz, a member of the Republican Party, was unopposed in seeking a fifth term in 2020, earning all but 14 of the 221 votes cast. In 2016, when seeking a fourth term, Cruz won the Hagåtña Republican mayoral primary on August 27, 2016, with 141 votes, defeating his only opponent, Jovyna San Agustin, who received 84 votes. As in 2020, he was unopposed in the 2016 mayoral general election.

Political offices
Preceded by Felix Ungacta	Mayor of Hagåtña; 2005–2025	Succeeded by Michael Gumataotao
