= Taleyfac Spanish Bridge =

- U.S. National Register of Historic Places
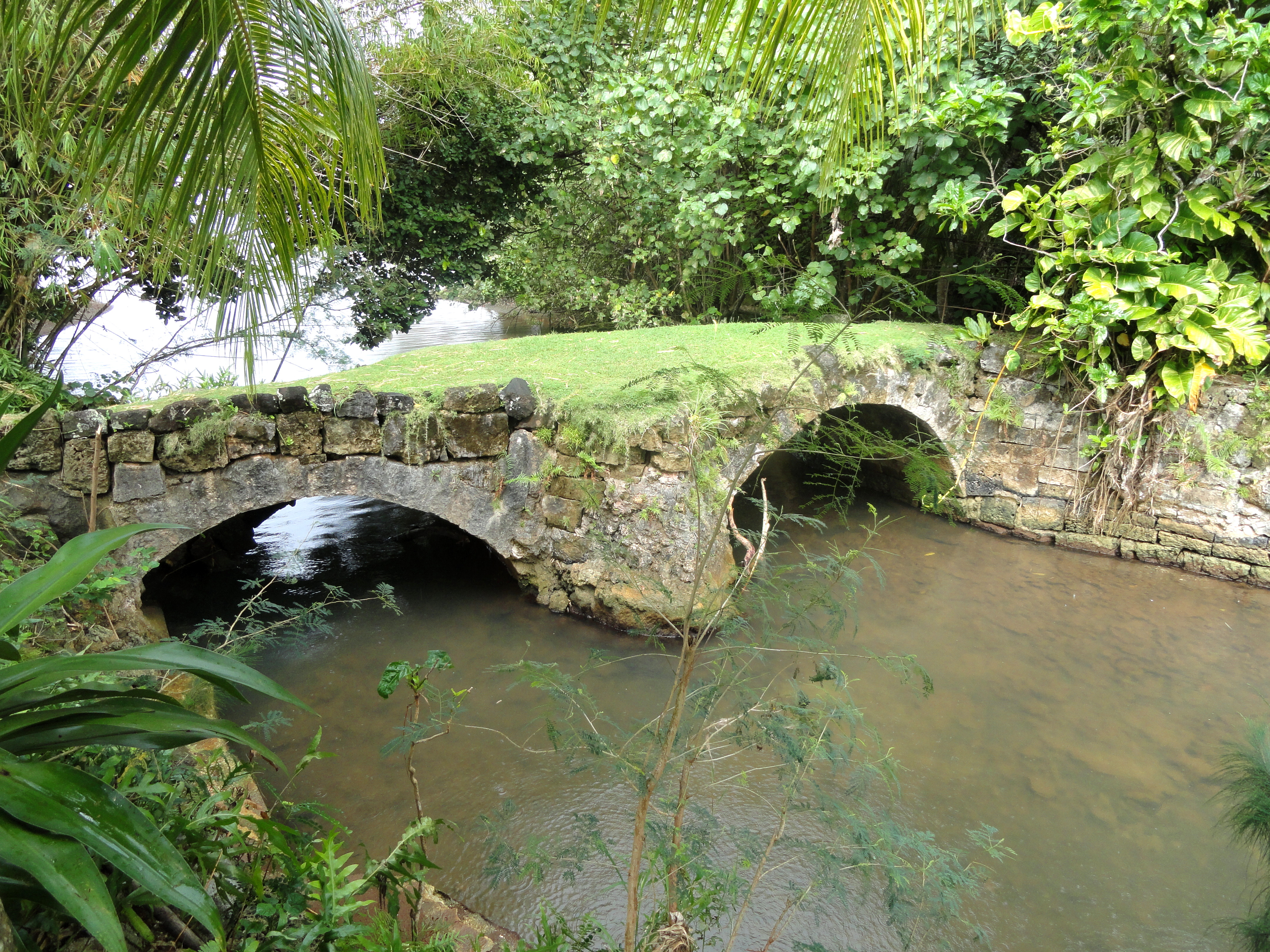

- Location within Guam
- Location: Off Rte. 2, Agat, Guam
- Coordinates: 13°21′48″N 144°38′58″E
- Area: 0.1 acres (0.040 ha)
- Architectural style: Spanish stone construction
- NRHP reference No.: 74002305
- Added to NRHP: September 10, 1974

The Taleyfac Spanish Bridge, known locally as Taleyfac Tolai Acho, is a historic stone arch bridge off Guam Highway 2 in Agat, Guam. It crosses the Taleyfac River with two stone arches; it is 36-foot (11 m) long and 15-foot (4.6 m) wide. It originally had wood timber flooring, which has long ago been replaced. One of the arches has been damaged by the removal or loss by erosion of some of its stones.

The bridge was built between 1866 and the United States' acquisition of Guam in 1898, when Guam was under Spanish colonial administration. It was listed on the National Register of Historic Places in 1974.

== See also ==
- National Register of Historic Places listings in Guam
- List of bridges on the National Register of Historic Places in Guam
