= John F. Kennedy High School (Guam) =

Public high school in Tamuning, Guam, United States

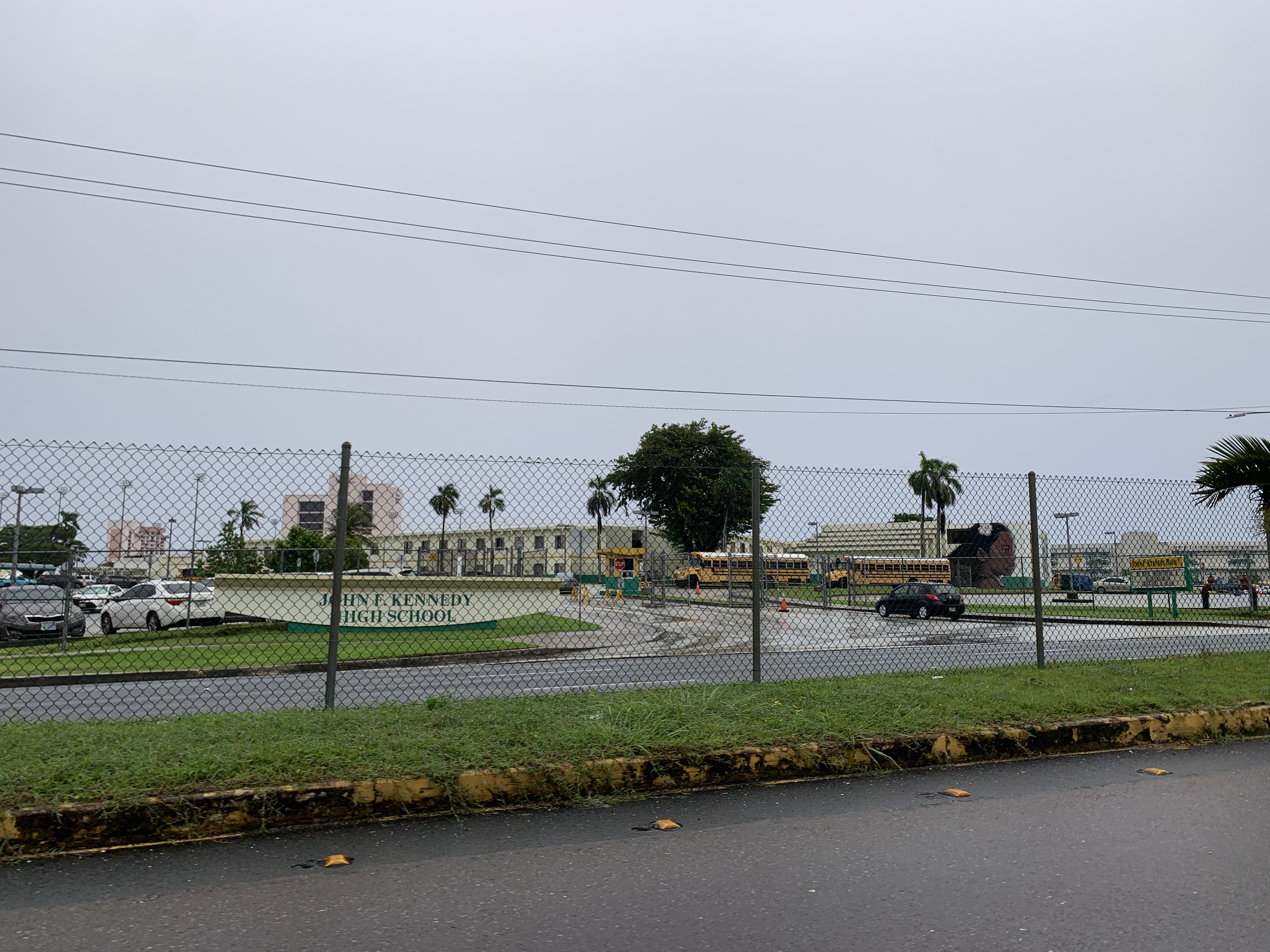
- John F. Kennedy High School in 2022

Location
- 331 N. Marine Corps Drive, Tamuning, Guam 96913; Tumon, Guam; 13.5011°N 144.7971°E

Information
- Type: Public
- Motto: "Home of the Islanders"
- Established: 1959
- School district: Guam Department of Education
- Principal: Barbara Adamos
- Staff: 50
- Faculty: 135
- Grades: 9–12
- Enrollment: 1,792 (SY 2021–22)
- Colors: Green and gold
- Mascot: Islanders
- Accreditation: Western Association of Schools and Colleges
- Website: gdoe.net/jfkislanders

John F. Kennedy High School (JFKHS), formerly Tumon Senior-Junior High School, is a public high school located in the Tumon area of Tamuning in the United States Territory of Guam. It is a part of the Guam Department of Education.

The school, which opened in September 1959, serves Tamuning, Hagåtña, and portions of Dededo.

== History ==
=== Early years ===
John F. Kennedy High School (JFKHS) was opened in September 1959 as Tumon Junior-Senior High School. The first graduating class was from the same school year and graduated in 1960. In November 1962, Typhoon Karen, a category 5 typhoon, devastated Guam, leaving the only other public high school, George Washington High School (GWHS) without a campus. Following Typhoon Karen, GWHS held double sessions at John F. Kennedy High School. During 1962, John F. Kennedy High School's chapter of the National Honor Society was chartered.

In 1964, Governor Manuel F.L. Guerrero signed Public Law 7–113, introduced by Senator J.U. Torres. This law renamed Tumon Junior-Senior High School "John F. Kennedy High School". Following enactment, the date of enactment was changed by Public Laws 7-124 and 7-125 to begin August 26, 1964. On August 26, 1965, Governor Guerrero signed Public Law 8-74, introduced by Senator George M. Bamba. This law appropriated $2,000 to design and erect a statue of President John F. Kennedy in front of John F. Kennedy High School.

John F. Kennedy High School's Air Force Junior Reserve Officers Training Corps (AFJROTC) started at the school in 1970. In 1976, the Guam Community College began offering vocational training courses in nursing, marketing, and electronics through JFKHS.

=== Temporary relocation ===
In June 2008 some of John F. Kennedy High School's buildings were declared unsafe, so for the school year 2008–2009, Kennedy students shared space with George Washington High School in double sessions. For the 2009–2010 school year, JFK moved into a facility in the Tiyan area of Barrigada. While other public high schools welcomed their students back on Tuesday, August 11, students at the interim John F. Kennedy high school at Tiyan were met with bad news after hearing that their school was delayed further after large amounts of the chlordane were found in the soil and in the air. The students were able to finally arrive to school on August 24 after the chlordane levels in the air were declared safe. The Islanders remained in this facility through the 2010–2011 school year.

Return to the Tumon campus

In August 2011, the JFKHS campus in Tumon was ready for occupancy. New equipment filled the classrooms and offices, to include: student and teacher desks, desktop computers, laptops, classroom furniture & equipment for the respective departments. Student enrollment averaged 2,800 annually until SY2014-2015 when a new central high school was opened. In 2018, the surface of the track and field lighting were replaced thus complementing the “newness” of the overall facility.

JFKHS accommodates approximately 1,750 students annually from grades 9 through 12 and is accredited by the Western Association of Schools and Colleges (WASC).

In celebration of JFKHS's 50th anniversary, the new statue of President Kennedy was presented to the student body, alumni, and the community of Guam.

=== Accreditation ===
The Western Association of Schools and Colleges (WASC) is the accreditation authority for John F. Kennedy High School. The following is a brief summary of the accreditation history of JFKHS:

Accreditation year	Accreditation period granted
1967	initial
1968	revisit, 2 years accreditation
1970	revisit, 2 years accreditation
1972	6 years accreditation
1978	3 years accreditation
1981	revisit, 2 years accreditation
1983	revisit, 4 years accreditation
1987	6 years accreditation
1993	6 years accreditation
1999	3 years accreditation
2002	3 years accreditation
2005	2 years accreditation
2007	1 year accreditation
2008	3 years accreditation
2011	3 years accreditation
2014	3 years accreditation
2017	6 years accreditation
2020	mid-term visit, reaffirmed

== Student body ==
During the 1999–2000 school year, the school had 2,400 students. 42% were Filipino, 37% were Chamorro, and the next largest groups Asians and other Pacific Islanders.

== Notable alumni ==
- Leevin Camacho, attorney general of Guam
- Jeff Cobb, professional wrestler and former amateur wrestler
- John A. Cruz, politician and retired civil servant, Mayor of Hagåtña since 2005
- Eugene, member of the Korean girl group S.E.S.
- William C. McCool, NASA astronaut
- James Moylan, Guam delegate to the U.S. House of Representatives (2023–)
- Michael San Nicolas, delegate to the U.S. House of Representatives (2019–2023)
- Terry Stotts, NBA head coach
- Robert A. Underwood, president of the University of Guam, delegate to the U.S. House of Representatives (1993–2003)

== See also ==
- List of memorials to John F. Kennedy
