= Taleyfac River =

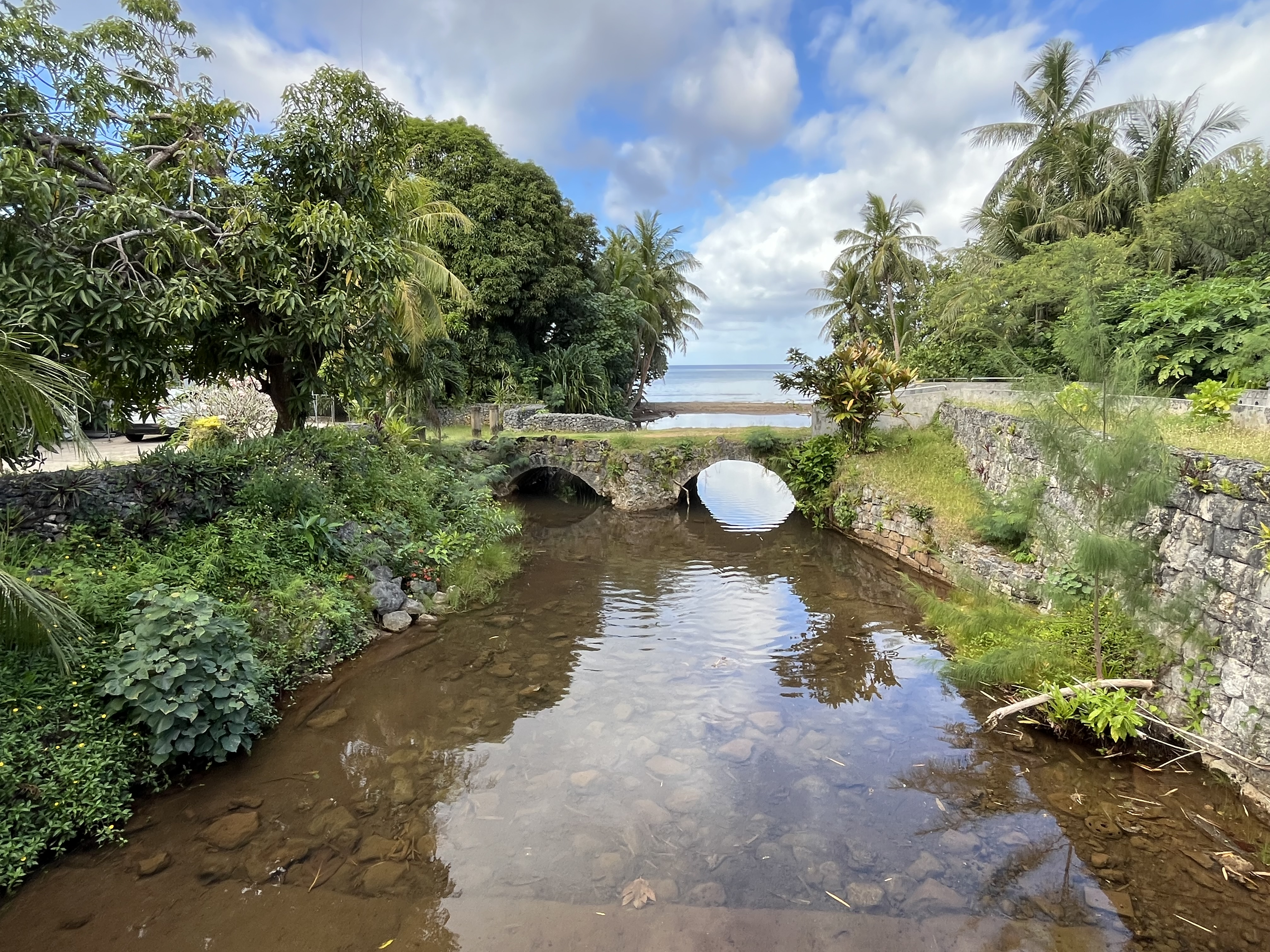

Location
- Country: Guam

Physical characteristics
- Mouth
  - coordinates: 13.3605556°N 144.6461111°E

The Taleyfac River is a river in the United States territory of Guam.

It is crossed by Taleyfac Spanish Bridge, a historic stone arch bridge that is listed on the U.S. National Register of Historic Places.

== See also ==
- List of rivers of Guam
