= Taelayag Spanish Bridge =

- U.S. National Register of Historic Places
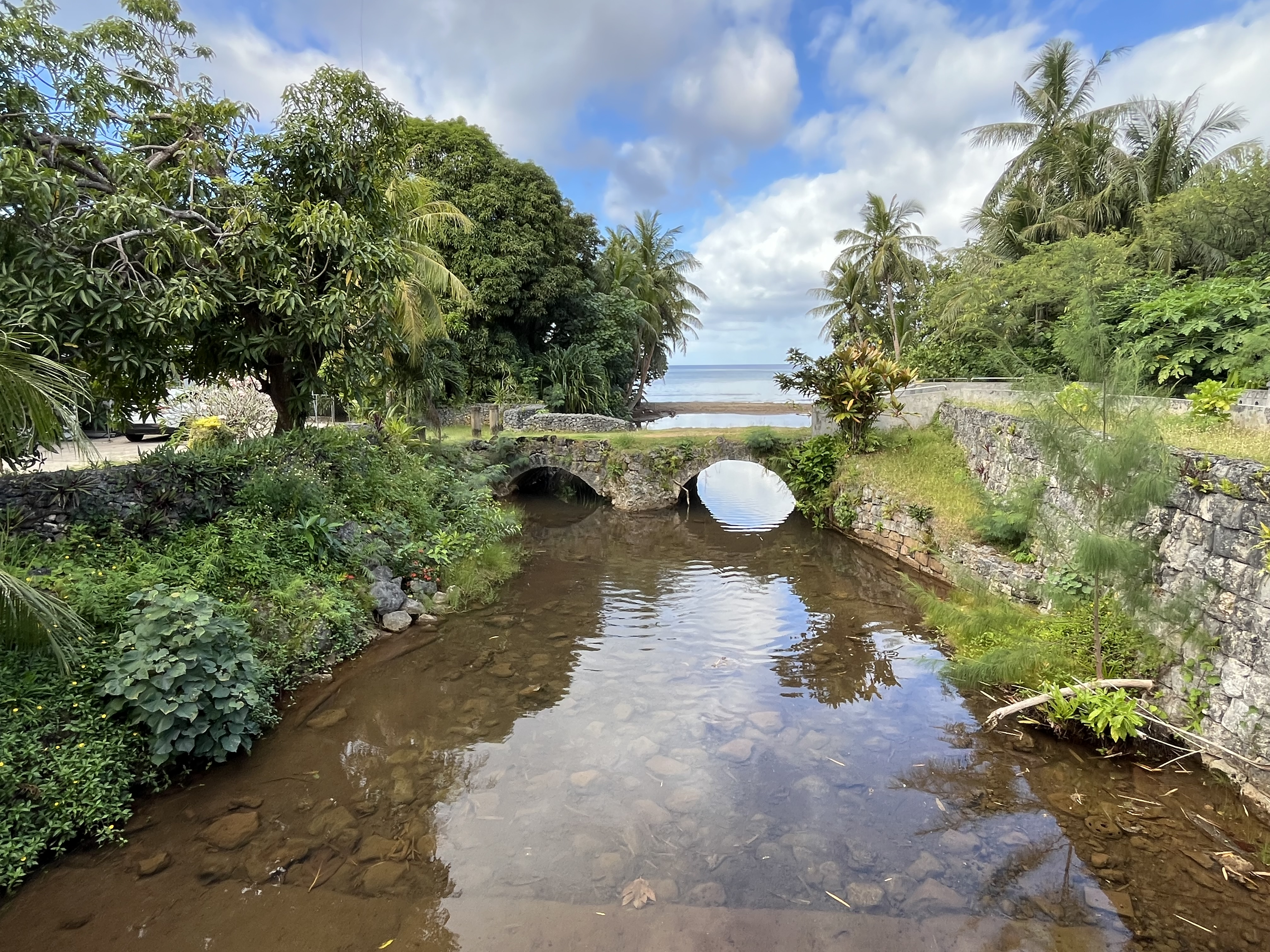

- Location within Guam
- Location: W of Guam Highway 2, Agat, Guam
- Coordinates: 13°21′12″N 144°38′36″E
- Area: less than one acre
- Architectural style: Spanish stone and mortar construction
- NRHP reference No.: 74002304
- Added to NRHP: October 10, 1974

The Taelayag Spanish Bridge is a historic stone bridge in the United States territory of Guam. It is a stone arch bridge, built sometime between 1866 and 1898, and originally carried the coast road between Agat, Guam and Umatac across Taelayag Stream. It is now located about 1,800 feet (550 m) southwest of Guam Highway 2, the modern coast road. The bridge is a single-span stone arch with a span of 8 feet 10 inches (2.69 m) and a total structure length of 27 feet 9 inches (8.46 m). This bridge, like most of the bridges that survive from the Spanish period in Guam, was probably taken out of service around 1917.

The bridge was listed on the National Register of Historic Places in 1974.

== See also ==
- National Register of Historic Places listings in Guam
- List of bridges on the National Register of Historic Places in Guam
