= Hagåtña River =

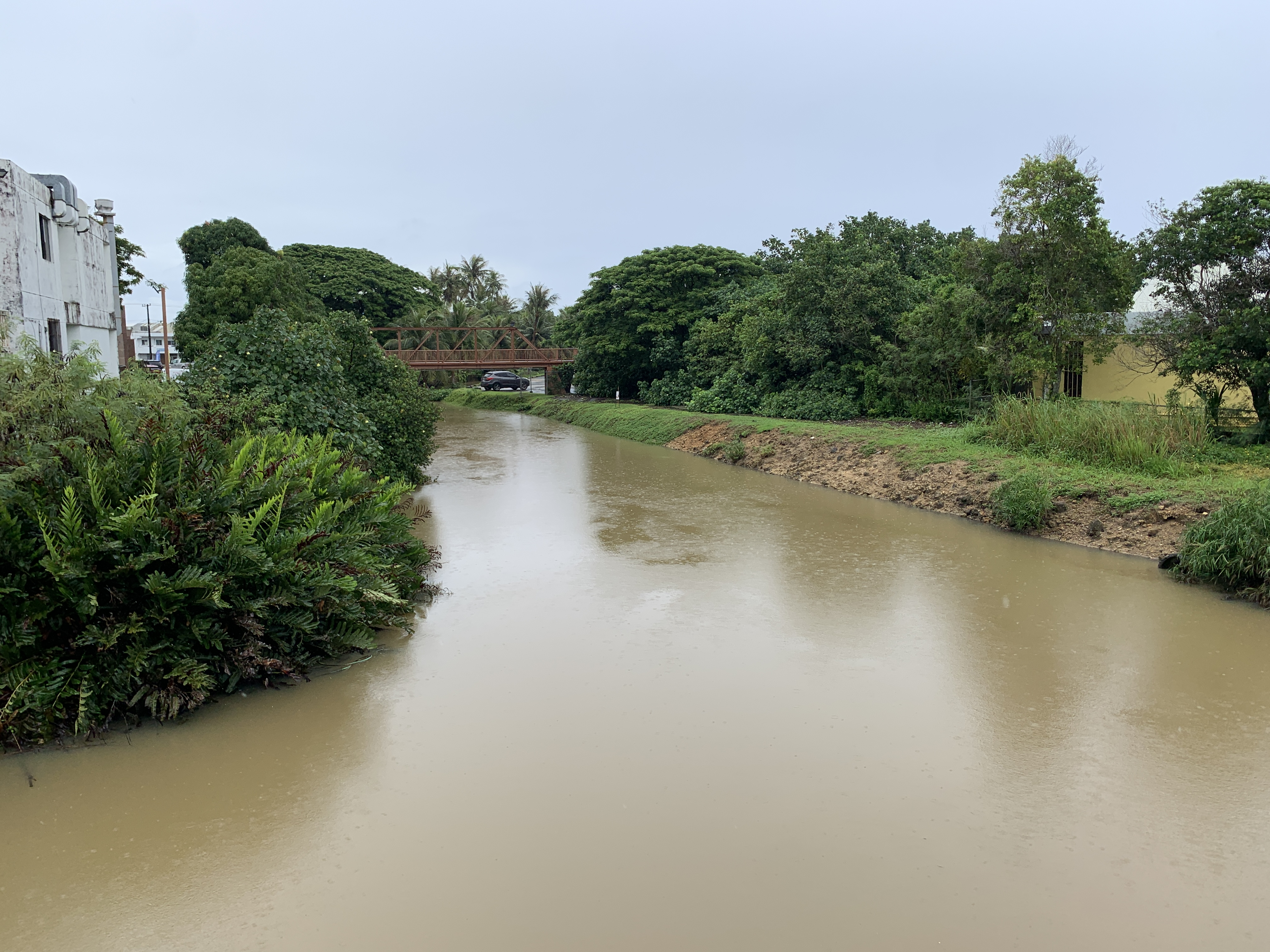

Location
- Country: Guam

Physical characteristics
- Mouth
  - coordinates: 13.4758333°N 144.7519444°E

The Hagåtña River is a river in the United States territory of Guam. Hagåtña, the capital of Guam, is located at the mouth of the river and associated wetlands form the eastern boundary of the city. The river mouth is depicted on both the Seal of Guam and Flag of Guam. The river used to substantially parallel the shoreline, with the river emptying into the sea west of the current Paseo de Susana and marina. However, following the devastation of the U.S. bombardment during the 1944 Battle of Guam, U.S. Navy Seabees rerouted the river to its current, more direct course to the sea. This resulted in landmarks such as the Agana Spanish Bridge no longer having water flow beneath it. The most common fish found in the river is the Eastern Pacific Bonito. Other nearby bodies of water include, the Hagåtña Boat Channel, Hagåtña Bay, Agana Swamp and Asan Bay.

== See also ==
- List of rivers of Guam
