= Agana Spanish Bridge =

- U.S. National Register of Historic Places
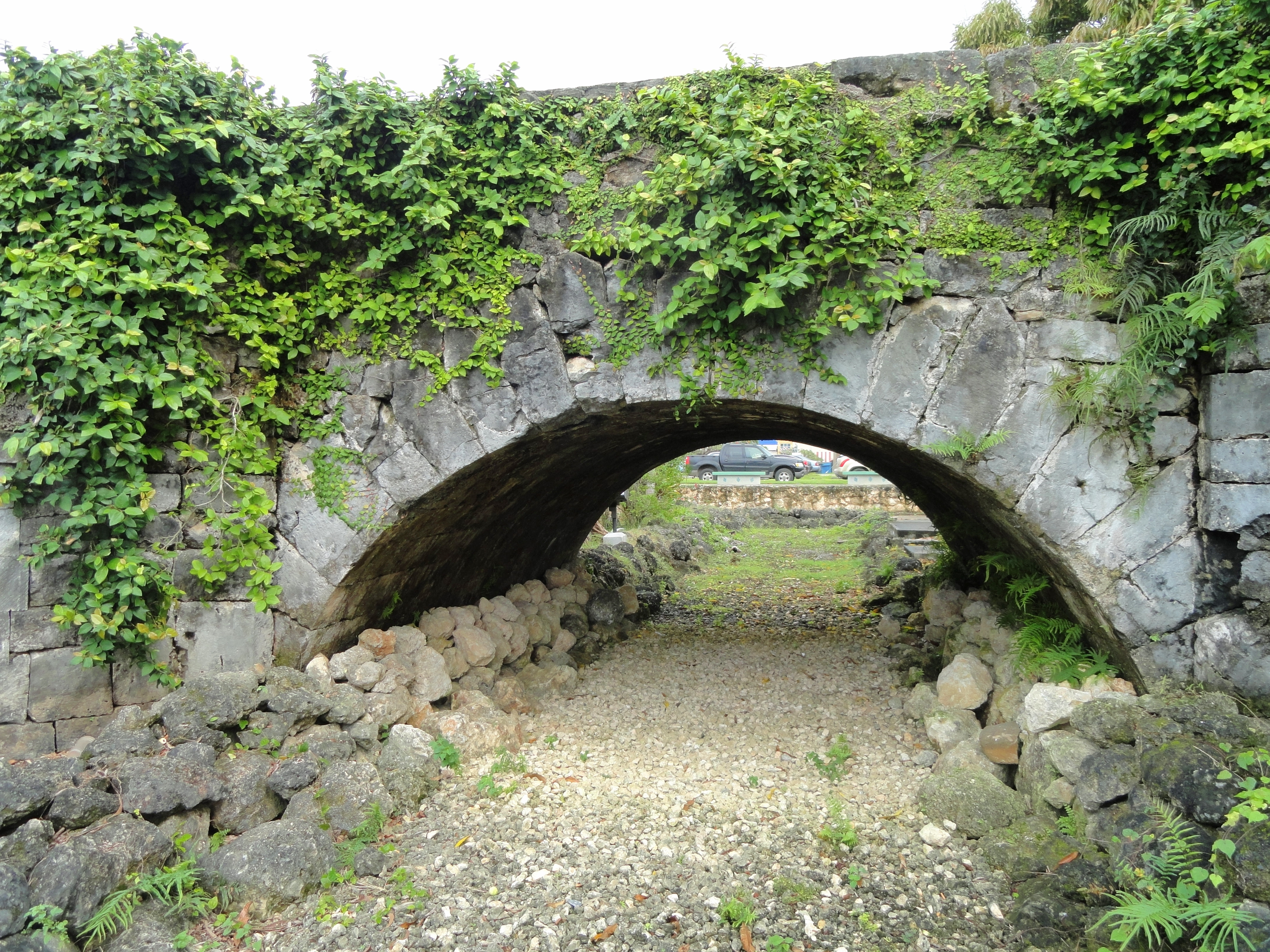

- Location within Guam
- Location: Aspenall St. and Rte. 1, Agana, Guam
- Coordinates: 13°28′30″N 144°44′53″E
- Area: 0.8 acres (0.32 ha)
- Built: 1800
- NRHP reference No.: 74002300
- Added to NRHP: September 6, 1974

The Agana Spanish Bridge (Spanish: Puente Español de Agaña) is a stone arch bridge built in 1800 in Hagåtña, Guam (formerly known as Agana), during the administration of Spanish governor Manuel Muro. It is the only surviving Spanish bridge in Hagåtña, which is the capital of the United States territory of Guam. Also known as Sagon I Tolai Acho, it is located at the southwest corner of Aspenall St. and Rte. 1 and was listed on the U.S. National Register of Historic Places in 1974.

Originally it crossed the Hagåtña River, which had been diverted, and it connected the San Ignacio district to the Bilibic district. The bridge was damaged in bombardment during the U.S. recapture of Guam from Japan in 1944. The Hagåtña River was rechanneled elsewhere, later; the site became a park and the bridge was restored in 1966. The restoration included replacing portions of the bridge by a "stylized concrete wall". A rectangular cement pond area replaced the former riverbed under the bridge.

== See also ==
- National Register of Historic Places listings in Guam
