= Hagåtña, Guam =

Capital city of Guam, United States

Hagåtña Agana / Agaña
- Village
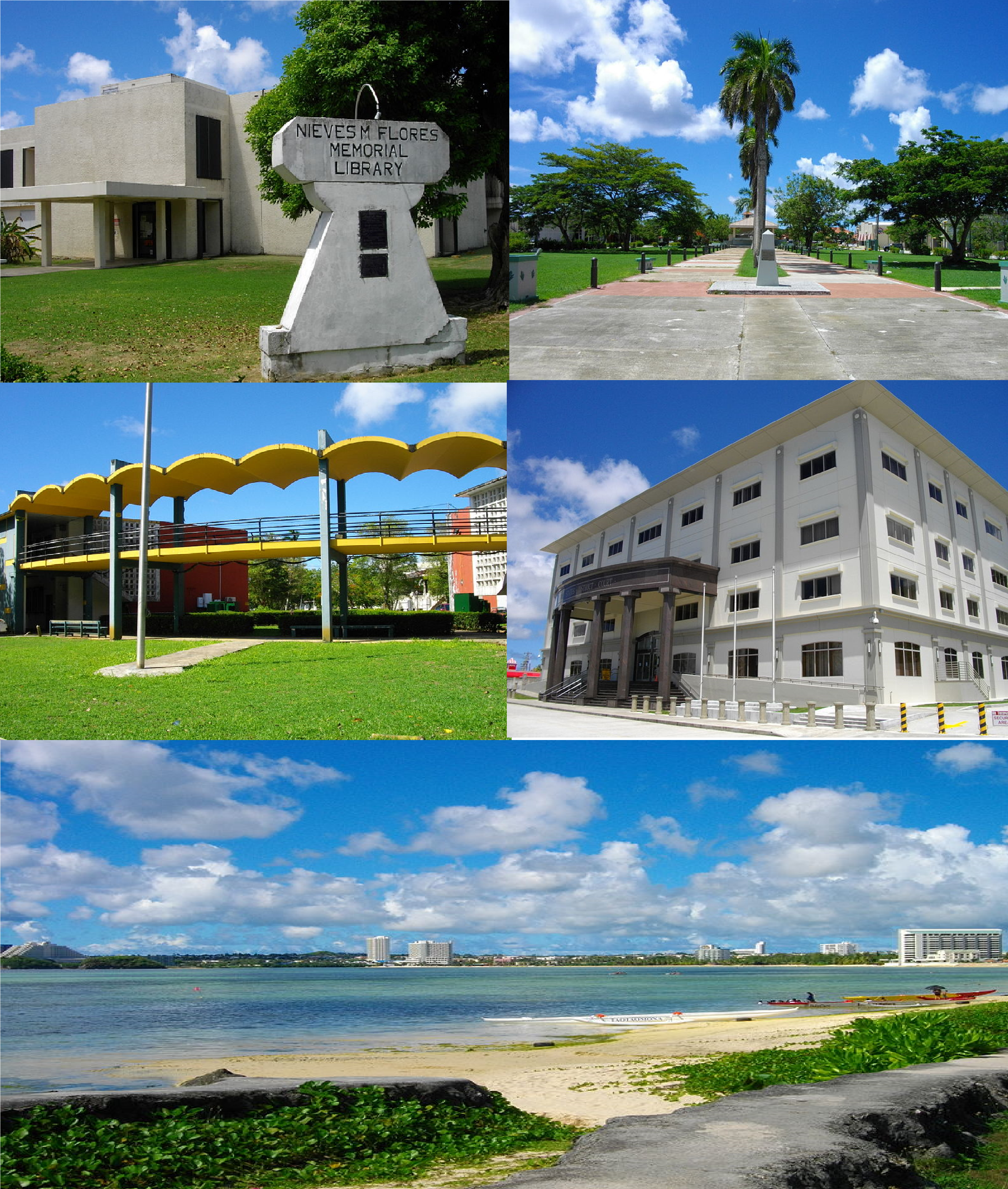
- From top left: Nieves M. Flores Memorial Library; Skinner Plaza; Former Manuel F.L. Guerrero Administration Building (demolished in 2015); District Court of Guam; and Trinchera Beach on Agana Bay

- Flag Seal

- Location of Hagåtña (Agana) within the Territory of Guam

- Location within Guam Location within North Pacific Location within Earth
- Coordinates: 13°28′45″N 144°45′00″E
- Country: United States
- Territory: Guam

Government
  - Mayor: Michael T.C. Gumataotao (R)

Area
  - Total: 1 sq mi (2.6 km^{2})

Population (2020)
  - Total: 943
- Time zone: UTC+10 (ChST)
- ZIP codes: 96910, 96932 (PO Box)
- Area code: 671

Hagåtña, (Note: /həˈɡɑːtnjə/ hə-GAHT-nyə, Chamorro pronunciation: [hæˈɡɑtɲæ].) formerly Agana or Agaña, (Note: /əˈɡɑːnjə/ ə-GAH-nyə, Spanish pronunciation: [aˈɣaɲa].) is a coastal village and the capital of the United States territory of Guam. The settlement is on the west coast of Guam at the mouth of the Hagåtña River. It had a population of 943 people as of the 2020 census.

From the 18th through mid-20th century, it was Guam's population center, but today, it is the second smallest of the island's 19 villages in both area and population. However, it remains one of the island's major commercial districts in addition to being the seat of government.

== Etymology ==
"Hagåt" (also romanized as haga', with a glottal stop instead of a syllable-final "t") means "blood" in the Chamorro language. The suffix "-ña" can be translated as either the possessive pronouns his, hers or its in English (cognate to -nya in Malay and Indonesian, and niya in Tagalog), or a signification of greater comparative degree, similar to some uses of the English suffix "-er". There is much speculation that the indigenous peoples originally migrated from the village of Agat/Hagåt. Therefore, "Hagåtña" can be translated "his or her blood" possibly meaning "related to him, her or it", or it could be translated to what might roughly mean "more Hagåt", as in, an extension of the village of Hagåt. It could also mean "better Hagåt", or "more than, surpassing or superior to Hagåt" in a sense of being "more Hagåt than Hagåt itself". In 1998, the Guam Legislature changed the name from "Agana" back to the original Chamorro form. However, the name of the neighboring village Agana Heights remains unchanged.

== Geography ==
Hagåtña is located at the mouth of the Hagåtña River on Guam's west coast. According to the United States Census Bureau, the city has a total area of 1 square mile (2.6 km²). It is (by direction of travel) the westernmost state or territorial capital city of the United States. The village is bounded by the sandy beaches of Agana Bay to the north, the Hagåtña River and associated wetlands to the east, and a cliff (above which is the village of Agana Heights) to the South. Several high-rise office buildings are in the center of the village, while the western portion of the city known as Anigua is more residential. Unlike many villages, central Hagåtña is divided into city blocks with shops and small restaurants throughout the center of the village. Highly populated residential areas in the villages of Mongmong-Toto-Maite, Sinajana, and Agana Heights surround Hagåtña.

=== Climate ===
The city has a tropical rainforest climate (Köppen: Af) similar to that found in the Amazon Basin. Rainfall is high especially from June to November, reaching 978 millimeters (38.50 in) in a single month in August 1997, whilst the year 2004 was the wettest in history with 3,539 millimeters (139.33 in).

Climate data for Hagåtña
Month	Jan	Feb	Mar	Apr	May	Jun	Jul	Aug	Sep	Oct	Nov	Dec	Year
Record high °C (°F)	34.4 (93.9)	33.9 (93.0)	33.9 (93.0)	35.6 (96.1)	34.4 (93.9)	35.0 (95.0)	35.0 (95.0)	34.4 (93.9)	33.9 (93.0)	35.0 (95.0)	33.3 (91.9)	32.8 (91.0)	35.6 (96.1)
Mean daily maximum °C (°F)	29.4 (84.9)	29.4 (84.9)	29.9 (85.8)	30.7 (87.3)	31.1 (88.0)	31.1 (88.0)	30.6 (87.1)	30.3 (86.5)	30.4 (86.7)	30.4 (86.7)	30.3 (86.5)	29.8 (85.6)	30.3 (86.5)
Daily mean °C (°F)	26.8 (80.2)	26.6 (79.9)	27.1 (80.8)	27.7 (81.9)	28.1 (82.6)	28.1 (82.6)	27.7 (81.9)	27.4 (81.3)	27.4 (81.3)	27.6 (81.7)	27.7 (81.9)	27.3 (81.1)	27.5 (81.4)
Mean daily minimum °C (°F)	24.2 (75.6)	23.9 (75.0)	24.2 (75.6)	24.7 (76.5)	25.1 (77.2)	25.2 (77.4)	24.8 (76.6)	24.6 (76.3)	24.6 (76.3)	24.7 (76.5)	25.1 (77.2)	24.9 (76.8)	24.7 (76.4)
Record low °C (°F)	18.9 (66.0)	18.3 (64.9)	18.9 (66.0)	20.0 (68.0)	21.1 (70.0)	21.1 (70.0)	21.1 (70.0)	21.1 (70.0)	21.1 (70.0)	19.4 (66.9)	20.0 (68.0)	20.0 (68.0)	18.3 (64.9)
Average rainfall mm (inches)	126 (5.0)	115 (4.5)	70 (2.8)	91 (3.6)	109 (4.3)	180 (7.1)	308 (12.1)	436 (17.2)	360 (14.2)	300 (11.8)	233 (9.2)	152 (6.0)	2,480 (97.8)
Average rainy days	20.7	19.1	18.1	18.7	20.2	21.7	25.5	26.5	24.8	25.2	23.5	23.0	267
Average relative humidity (%)	77.6	76.3	74.8	75.7	76.9	77.4	80.6	83.2	84.2	82.8	81.1	79.2	79.2
Source: pogodaiklimat.ru and Weatherbase (humidity)

== History ==
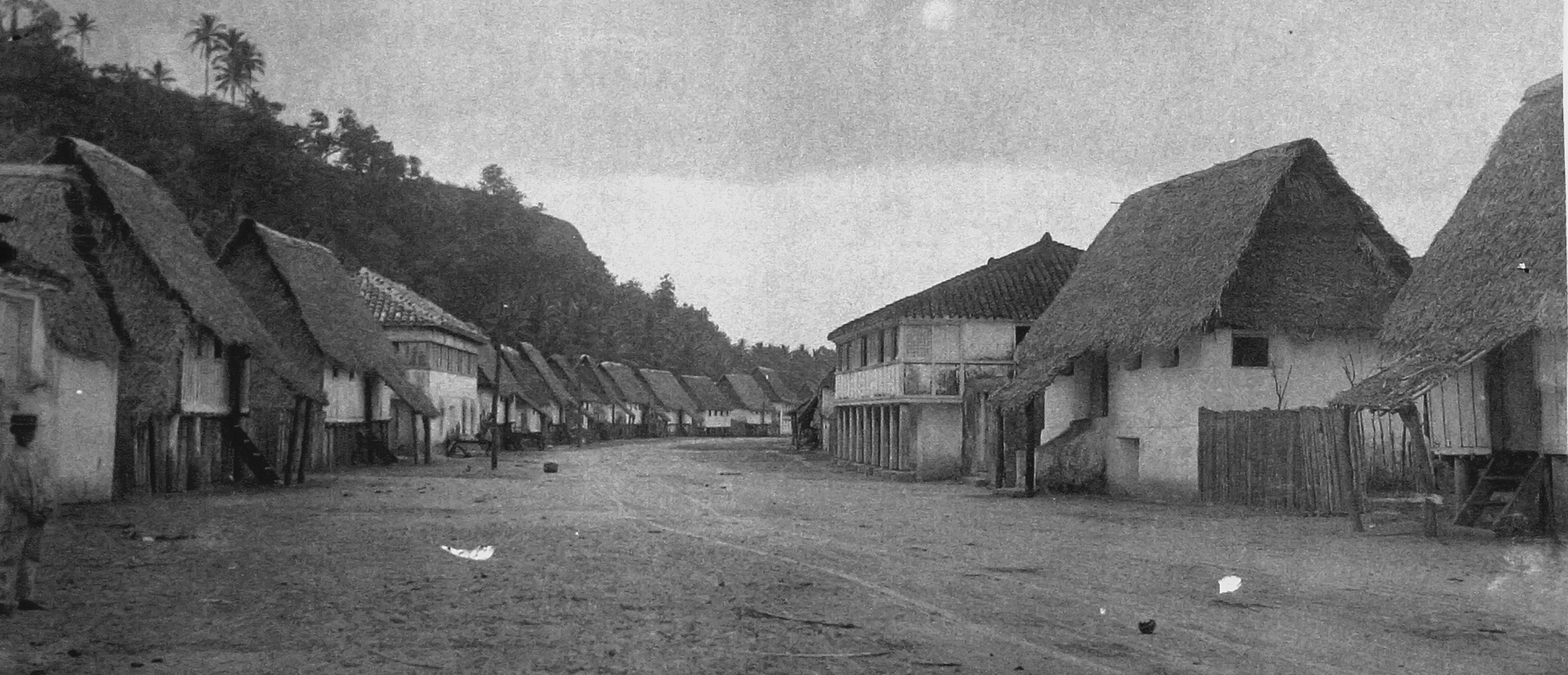
Main street of Hagåtña, around 1899–1900.

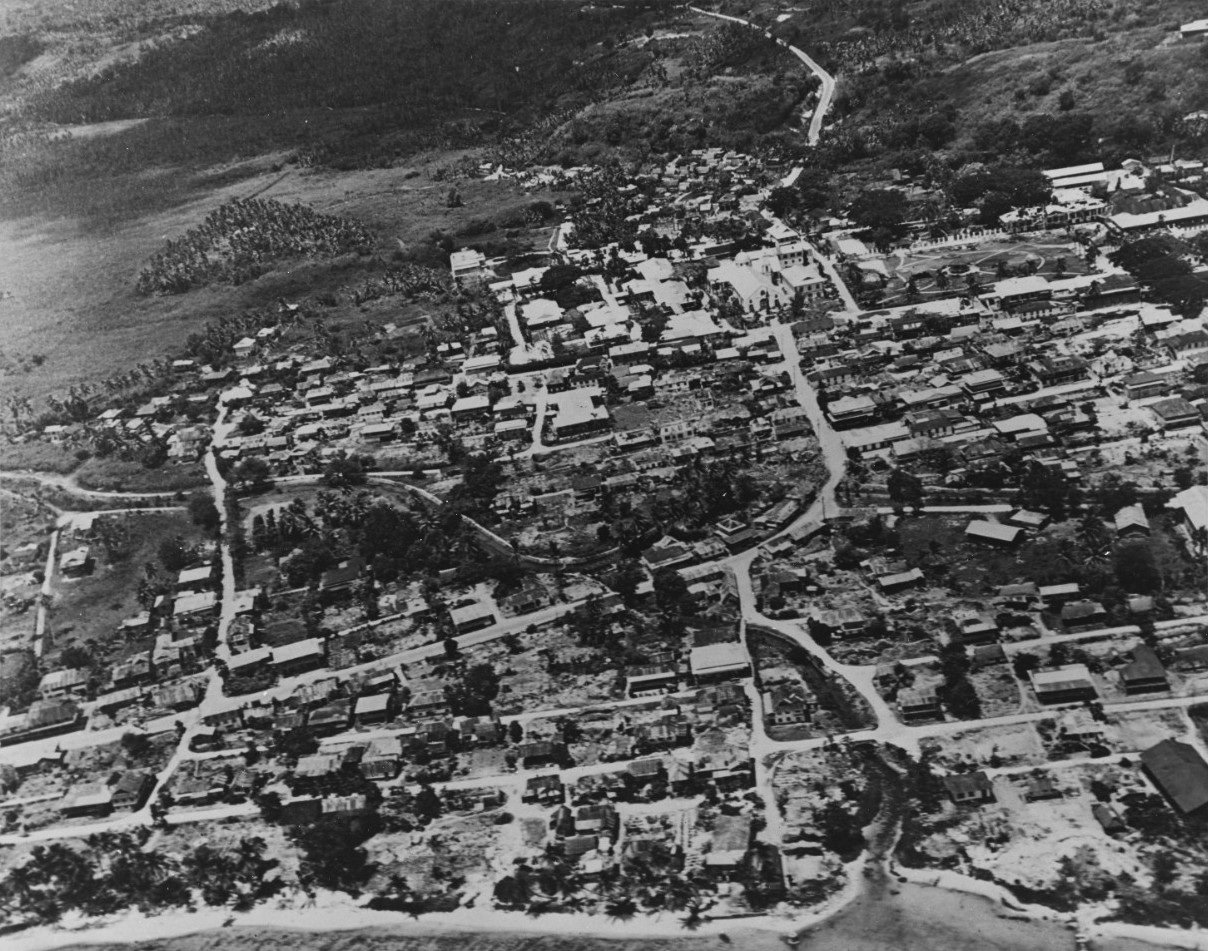
Aerial view of Hagåtña in 1943. The Plaza de España is in the upper right. The Hagåtña River was rerouted by Navy Seabees after the Battle of Guam and no longer flows under the Spanish Bridge.

Hagåtña was a prominent village before Guam's colonization by the Spanish. In 1668, the first Spanish missionary led by the Spanish priest San Vitores and his team arrived on the island. The colonizers proselytized and forced the indigenous Chamorro people to convert to Christianity, in many cases without consent. One of those who converted, Chief Kepuha, donated land in Hagåtña enabling San Vitores to build the first church (Dulce Nombre de Maria Cathedral-Basilica) on Guam, which was used by San Vitores to further colonize the indigenous peoples and their lands.

Under Spanish rule, and particularly the Spanish-Chamorro Wars, much of the indigenous population of Guam and other Mariana Islands were forced to relocate to the city after a genocide was instigated and conducted by the Spanish, led by San Vitores, against the indigenous population. The remains of buildings from the Spanish administration can be seen in the Plaza de España located beside the cathedral of the Archdiocese of Agaña. The remains of the Spanish Governor's Palace is here and is closer to the Department of Education than the Cathedral.

After Guam was ceded by Spain to the United States in the Spanish–American War of 1898, Hagåtña remained the seat of government under U.S. Naval Administration. By 1940, the city's population had grown to about 10,000 containing nearly half of the island's residents. Villages had been established nearby for immigrants from the Caroline Islands.

Guam was captured by Japanese forces on December 8, 1941. The Japanese renamed Guam to Ōmiya-jima (Japanese: 大宮島), or Great Shrine Island, and Hagåtña to Akashi (Japanese: 明石), or Bright Stone. During Guam's 1944 liberation from the Japanese during World War II, the city was heavily damaged by U.S. naval bombardment. Many former residents settled in other parts of Guam after the war. As part of Guam's reconstruction plan, the U.S. Navy constructed new, straight city streets that passed through existing lots and created many plots of land with multiple owners. This has hindered the development of the city to the present day. In December 1944, Guam was the scene of the Agana race riot, between black and white servicemen stationed on the island.

Today, despite a resident population of about 1,000 (less than 1% of Guam's total), the city remains the seat of the territorial government. Its historic sites are major attractions for visitors. Hagåtña is served by Antonio B. Won Pat International Airport in Tamuning and Barrigada.

== Culture ==
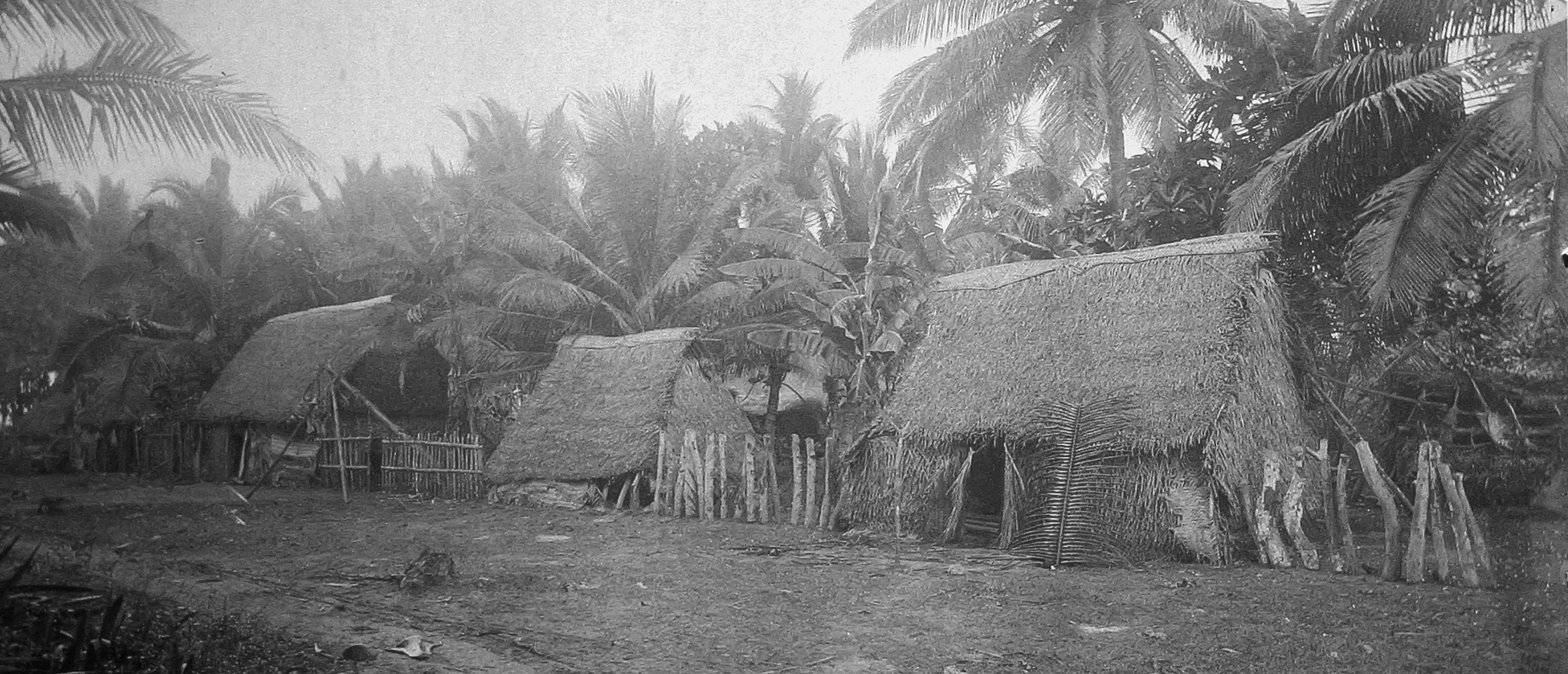
Village of Caroline Islands immigrants near Agana, 1899–1900.

As Guam's historic population and administrative center, many traditional celebrations take place in Hagåtña. On December 8, Santa Marian Kamalen, Patroness of the Mariana Islands, is honored with a procession in which a statue of the patroness is pulled on a cart amid the prayers of thousands of the island's Catholics. Guam's most celebrated patriotic holiday, Liberation Day, is on July 21. The annual Liberation Day Parade takes place on Marine Corps Drive in Hagåtña. In addition to the historic sites at the Plaza de España and the Basilica, Latte Stone Park and the Chamorro Village shopping area offer further information about the island's history and culture.

== Demographics ==
Historical population
Census	Pop.	Note	%±
1960	1,642		—
1970	2,119		29.0%
1980	896		−57.7%
1990	1,139		27.1%
2000	1,100		−3.4%
2010	1,051		−4.5%
2020	943		−10.3%

The U.S. Census Bureau has designated the municipality a single census-designated place.

As of the 2020 census, there were 943 people living within the Hagåtña census-designated place. The Census Bureau recorded 407 total housing units, of which 84.5% were occupied and 15.5% were vacant. The average household size was 2.58 residents.

== Infrastructure and government ==
The island's capital, the legislature, the governor's office and other government offices are in Hagåtña. The Government House (Chamorro: Guma I Taotao Guam), traditionally the governor's official residence, is situated above the cliff but technically within the city limit of Hagåtña. Adelup Point is the home of the Ricardo J. Bordallo Governor's Complex.

The Guam Department of Corrections operates the Hagåtña Detention Facility in Hagåtña.

Notable federal government agencies in Hagåtña include the District Court of Guam at 520 West Soledad Avenue, the United States Attorney at Sirena Plaza, 108 Hernan Cortez, Suite 500, and the United States Postal Service Post Office at 223 West Chalan Santo Papa.

== Twin towns and sister cities ==
Hagåtña is twinned with:

- Guadalajara, Jalisco, Mexico
- Quezon City, Philippines, since October 2000
- Malolos, Bulacan, Philippines
- Legazpi, Albay, Philippines

== Education ==
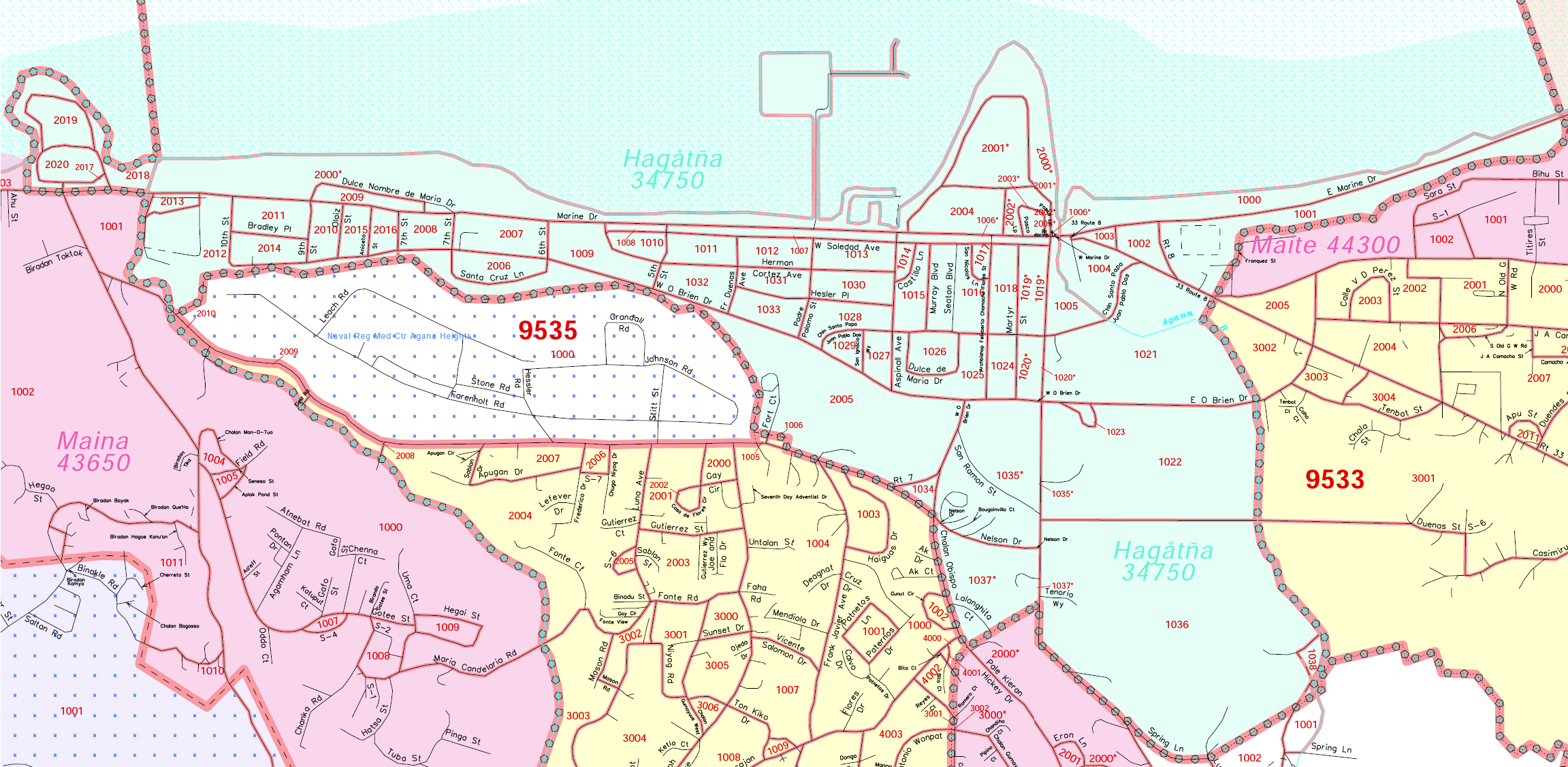
Census map of Hagåtña

=== Public schools ===
The Guam Department of Education serves the entire island of Guam.

Hagåtña residents are zoned to:

- Carlos L. Taitano Elementary School (Sinajana)
- Jose L. G. Rios Middle School (Piti)
- John F. Kennedy High School (Tamuning)

In regards to the Department of Defense Education Activity (DoDEA), Hagatna is divided between two school transportation zones. People living north of Guam Highway 4 are zoned to Andersen Elementary and Andersen Middle School, while people living south of Guam Highway 4 are zoned to McCool Elementary and McCool Middle School. Guam High School is the island's sole DoDEA high school.

=== Private schools ===
Private schools in Hagåtña include:

- Academy of Our Lady of Guam (Catholic girls' high school in Hagåtña)
- Harvest Christian Academy (Christian school in Mong Mong Toto Maite)

=== Public libraries ===
The Guam Public Library System operates the Nieves M. Flores Memorial Library at 254 Martyr Street in Hagåtña.

== Sites of interest ==
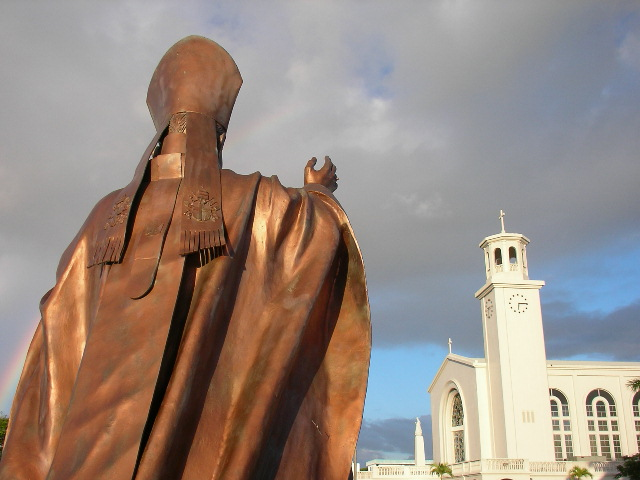
Dulce Nombre de Maria Cathedral Basilica facing a statue of Pope John Paul II

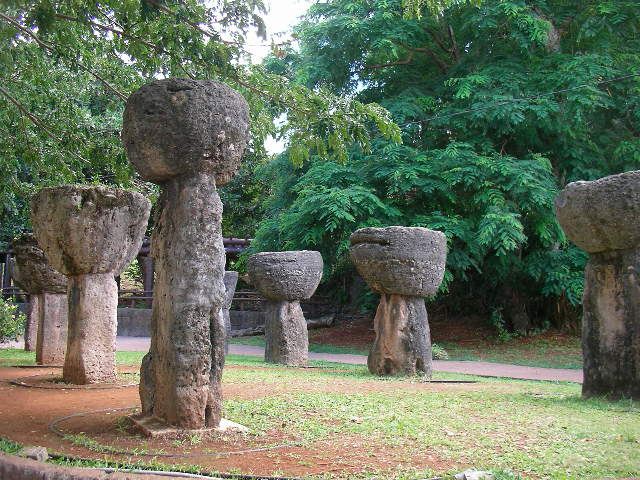
Latte Stone Park

- Gregorio D. Perez Marina (formerly, Agana Boat Basin)
- Agana Shopping Center
- Chamorro Village
- Chief Quipuha Park
- Dulce Nombre de Maria Cathedral Basilica
- Fort Santa Agueda
- Guam Congress Building
- Guam Museum
- Latte Stone Park
- Paseo Stadium
- Plaza de España
- Ricardo J. Bordallo Governor's Complex
- San Antonio Bridge (Tollai Achote)
- Sirena Park

== Notable people ==
- Ben Ada, politician
- Vicente T. Blaz, Brigadier General in the U.S. Marine Corps and former Guam delegate to the U.S. House of Representatives, born in Hagåtña
- Frank Camacho, mixed martial artist
- Jason Cunliffe, Guam international footballer
- Ann Curry, journalist born in Agaña
- Sian Proctor, commercial astronaut
- Venancio Roberto, two-day Governor of Guam.
- Kimberley Santos, Miss World 1980 (succeeded)

== Government ==
The seal of Guam depicts Agana River running into Agana Bay

Commissioner of Hagåtña
Name	Term begin	Term end
Joaquin Cruz Perez	1894	1899
Antonio C. Suarez	1918	1930
Antonio C. Suarez	1930 (as Chief Commissioner)	December 8, 1941
Juan D. Perez	1952	1962
Lucas L. San Nicolas	1962	January 1, 1973

Mayor of Hagåtña
Name	Party	Term begin	Term end
Thomas F. Mendiola	Democratic	January 1, 1973	January 5, 1981
Felix F. Ungacta	Republican	January 5, 1981	January 3, 2005
John A. Cruz	Republican	January 3, 2005	January 4, 2025
Michael T.C. Gumataotao	Republican	January 4, 2025	present
