= Paseo Stadium =

Stadium in Agana, Guam

Coordinates: 13°28′43″N 144°45′10″E

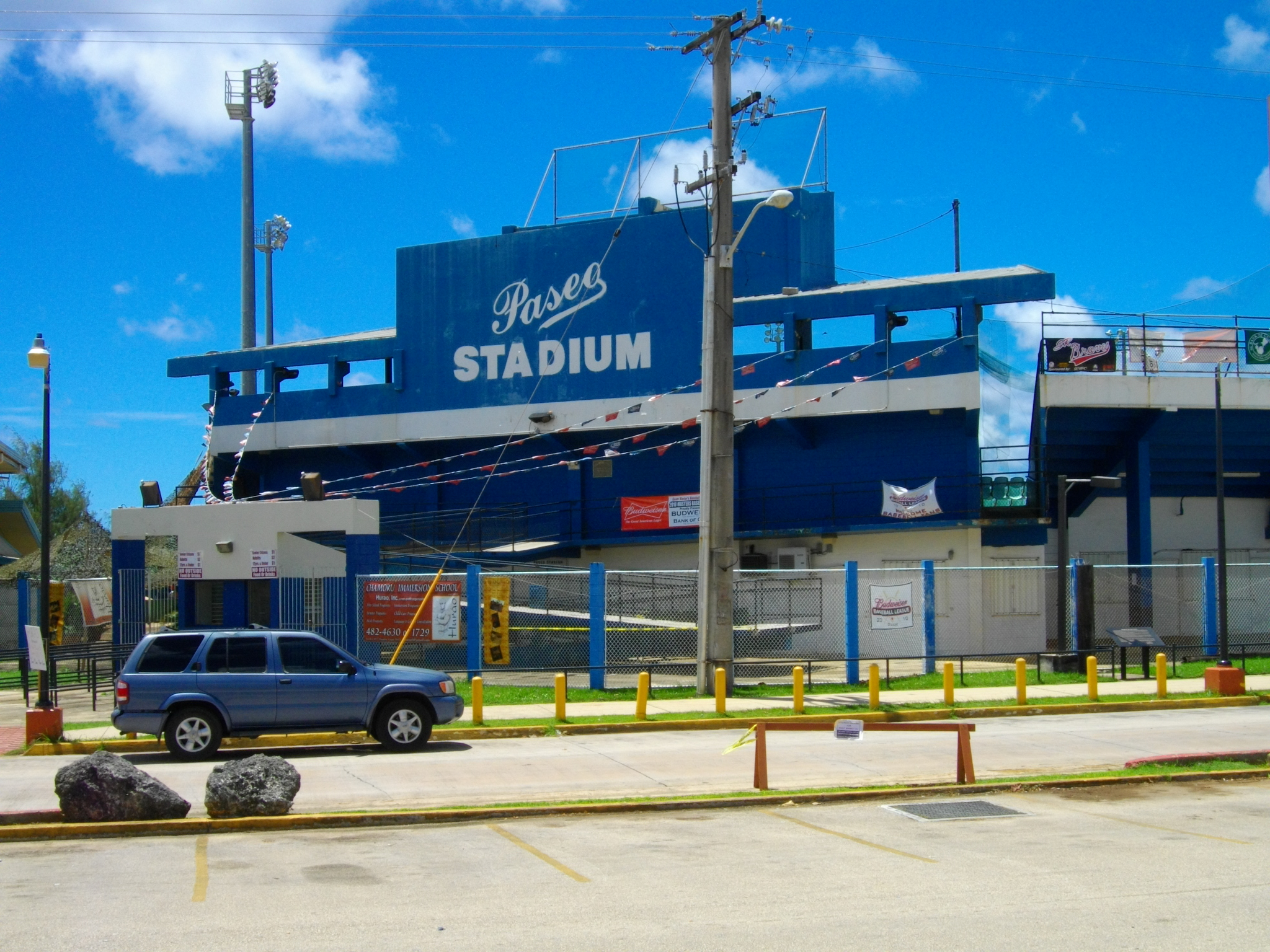
Paseo Stadium in 2010

Paseo Stadium is a multi-use stadium in Agana, Guam. It is currently used mostly for baseball matches. In the late 1970s with baseball popularity soaring and the success of the Guam Major League (GML) and youth baseball, the need for a new Guam baseball facility was in demand. The new Paseo Stadium, located at the Paseo de Susana in Hagatna replaced the old Paseo Ballpark on the same site. The old ballpark was falling into disrepair. The once-proud facility, tarnished through time, featured rusted steel girders and rock-hard wood-planked bleachers, which seated 1,100 baseball fans.

The new Paseo Stadium construction was a special project spearheaded by Guam Housing and Urban Renewal Authority (GHURA) chairman Mr. Robert J. Torres. With 1.2 million dollars in funding from GHURA and the Government of Guam Department of Commerce, along with full support from Governor Paul Calvo, the new stadium was constructed in 1981. The new baseball facility featured locker and shower rooms, concession booths, offices, walk-in dugouts and an elevated press box. The new stadium was constructed within the confines of the upgraded Paseo Ballpark 1979 lighting system. Only one of the existing light poles was relocated to accommodate the new Paseo Stadium space requirements. The new concrete and hollow-block facility originally featured aluminum bench seating. With additional portable bleachers, the facility capacity was increased to 2,800 seats. Years later the stadium seating was upgraded to individual stadium seats thus increasing spectator comfort while reducing original seating capacity.

On January 9, 1982, the new Paseo Stadium opened with the start of the 1982 Guam Major league baseball season. Before a twin-bill opening day crowd of 1,327 fans, the Atkins Kroll Islanders behind the pitching of Eddie Aguon defeated the Miller Stars 4–1. The University of Guam Tritons outscored the Ace Hardware Aces 10–8 in the second game.

May 12, 1987, saw the largest crowd ever to attend a baseball game at the Paseo. An overflow standing room only crowd of 4,397 fans, many on the outfield wall and scoreboard, jammed Paseo Stadium for the GML Championship series seventh and deciding game between the Pepsi Giants and the University of Guam.

Over the years, the Paseo Stadium has served as venue for baseball tournaments such as the Micronesian Games, Mobil Games, Little League regional playoff games and the Western Pacific Invitational Baseball Tournament. In June 1999, the facility hosted the first ever South Pacific Games (SPG) baseball tournament. Just days later the stadium served as venue for the 1999 Baseball Confederation of Oceania (BCO) championship tournament. The Guam national team captured both tournaments with stunning come-from-behind victories over American Samoa for SPG gold and the BCO title.

The stadium became a popular venue for concerts. In 2023, eight Senators proposed a law banning concerts and other events that could damage the field.
