= Piti Bomb Holes Marine Preserve =

Marine protected area in Guam

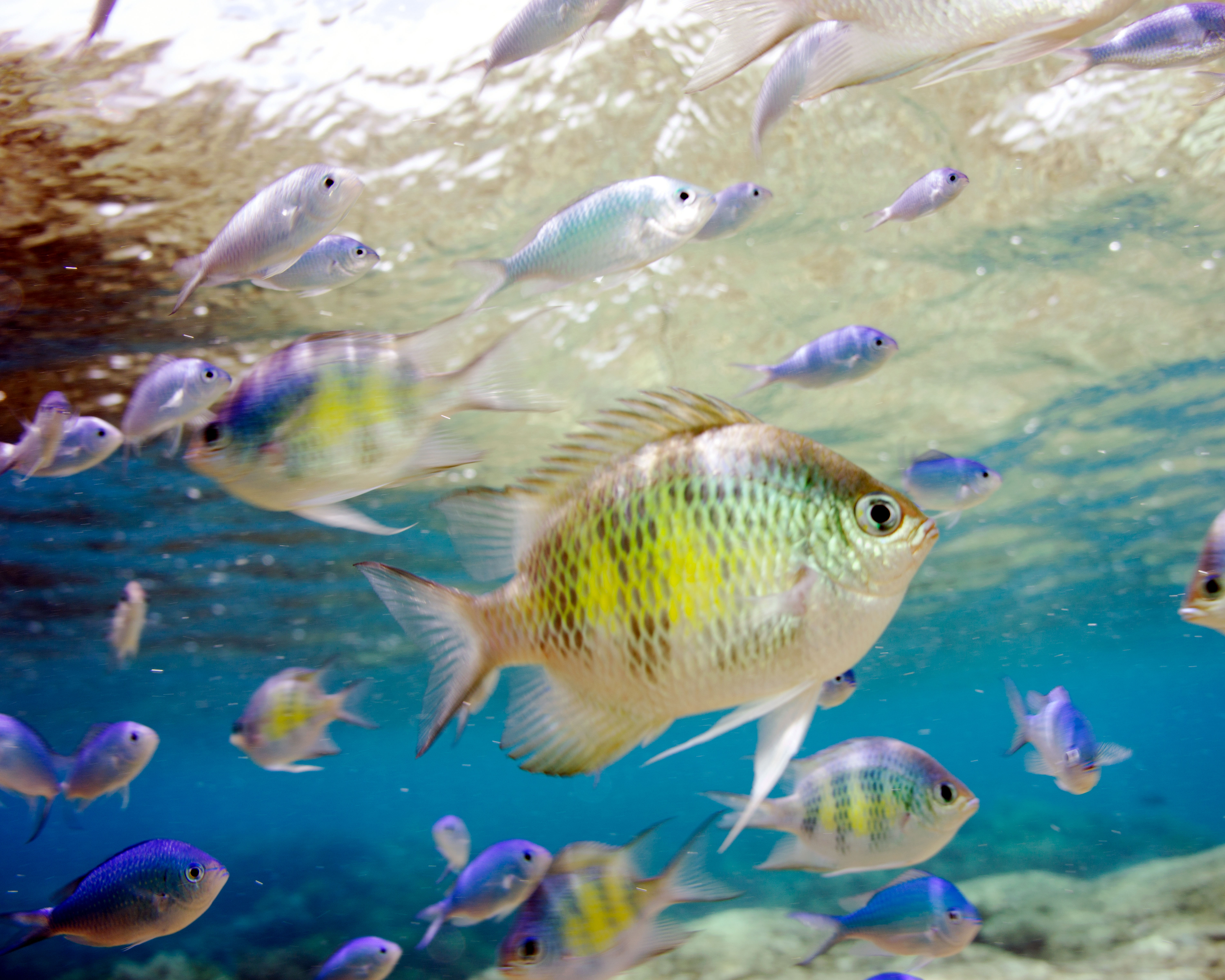
- Fish at Piti Bomb Holes Marine Preserve, 2012

- Location within Guam Location within Pacific Ocean Location within Earth
- Location: Piti Bay
- Nearest city: Piti, Guam
- Coordinates: 13.4702°N 144.7012°E
- Area: 3.64 km^{2} (900 acres)
- Established: 1999
- Governing body: Guam Department of Agriculture

Piti Bomb Holes Marine Preserve is a marine protected area comprising all of Piti Bay on the western coast of Guam, located off of the village of Piti in the Philippine Sea. The defining "bomb hole" features, named because they look like bomb craters in the reef flat, are actually natural percolation pits where fresh water filters into the shallow lagoon at a depth of 25 to 30 feet (7.6 to 9.1 m). The largest pit houses the commercial Fish Eye Marine Park tourist attraction, which includes a pier to an underwater observatory. It is visited by more than 200,000 people annually. The Piti preserve is the most ecologically diverse of Guam's five marine preserves. The pit around Fish Eye is a popular snorkeling and recreational diving site.

== Geography ==
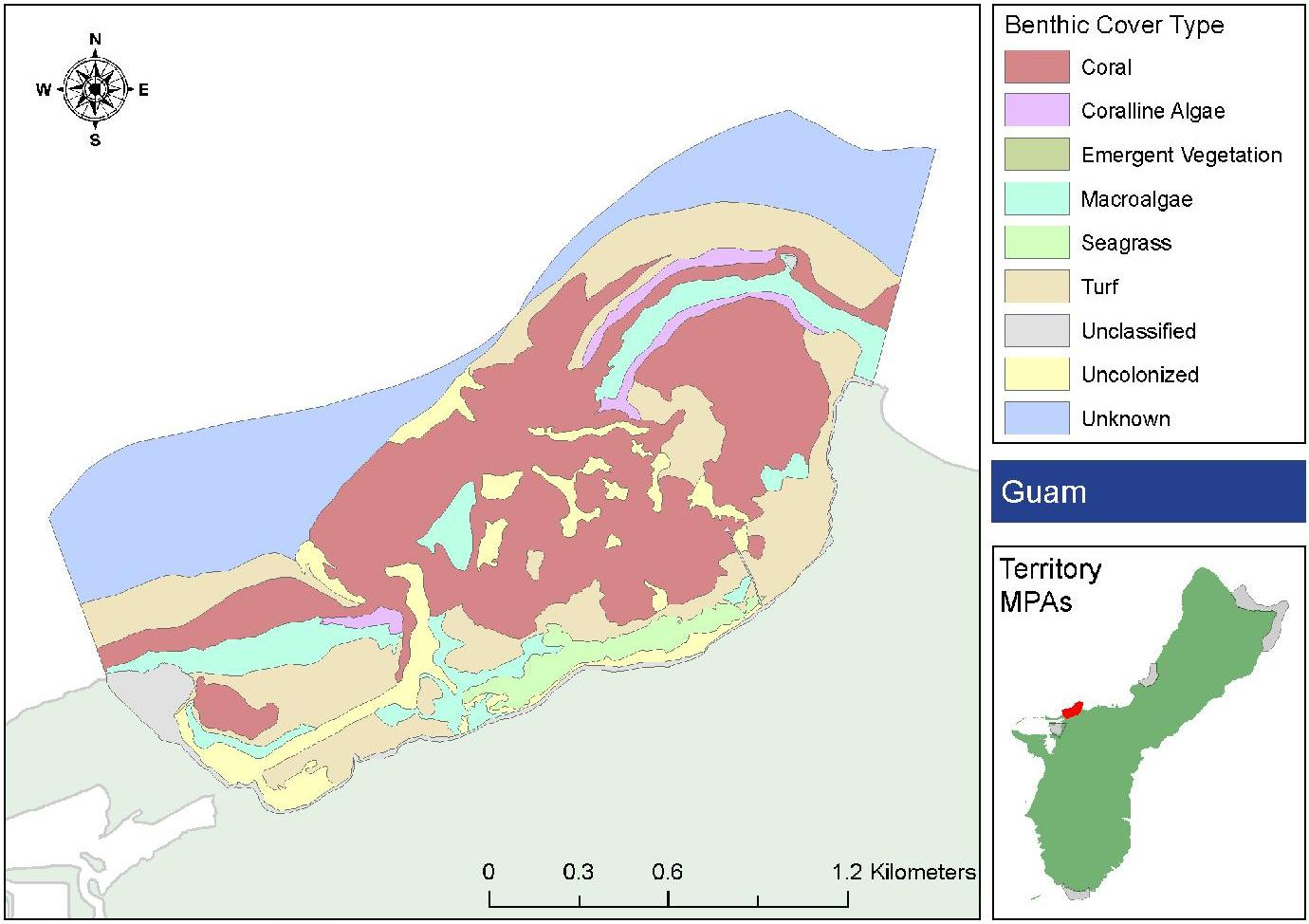
Benthic cover map of the preserve in 2009

The preserve is 3.64 square kilometres (900 acres), 1.4 square kilometres (350 acres) of which is a broad reef flat. It shares a fringing reef line with the regularly fished Asan Bay reef line. The eastern boundary of the preserve is off the tip of Asan Point in the village of Asan-Maina. Asan Point is the western boundary of Asan Invasion Beach, the northern invasion beach used by American forces in the 1944 retaking of the island. Therefore, portions of Piti Bomb Holes Marine Preserve around Asan Point also fall under the submarine portions of War in the Pacific National Historical Park's Asan Beach unit. The southern shoreline with Piti includes two beach parks: Tepungan Beach, at the entrance to the Fish Eye Marine Park pier, and Pedro Santos Memorial Park, farther west. Three rivers drain into the preserve: from east to west, these are the Matgue River, the Taguag River, and the Masso River.

The western boundary of the preserve includes portions of Cabras Island to Piti Canal, a man-made cut, and includes the Tepungan Channel. Piti Canal and Tepungan Channel are used to intake cooling water intake to the Guam Power Authority plant at Cabras; discharge is into the Piti Channel that empties into Apra Harbor. Tepungan Channel and other parts of the western preserve include a cable trench for submarine communications cables landing at Piti.

=== Ecology ===
Much of the shoreline is fringed by seagrasses, which provide refuge for juvenile fish, while the three small river mouths provide estuarine nursery habitat for many species. The "bomb holes", actually freshwater percolation pits, are the deepest features of the preserve, ranging down to 25 to 30 feet (7.6 to 9.1 m). Two identified species of mollusk and one species of sea urchin are endemic to Piti Bomb Holes Preserve, being found nowhere else in the world. The sinkholes have dense populations of hard and soft coral, supporting fish and invertebrate populations not found elsewhere in the preserve. The Piti preserve is the most ecologically diverse of Guam's five marine protected areas (MPAs), which was the driving factor why it was selected as an MPA site in 1999. Establishment of the preserve resulted in a greater than 100% increase in the number of fish.

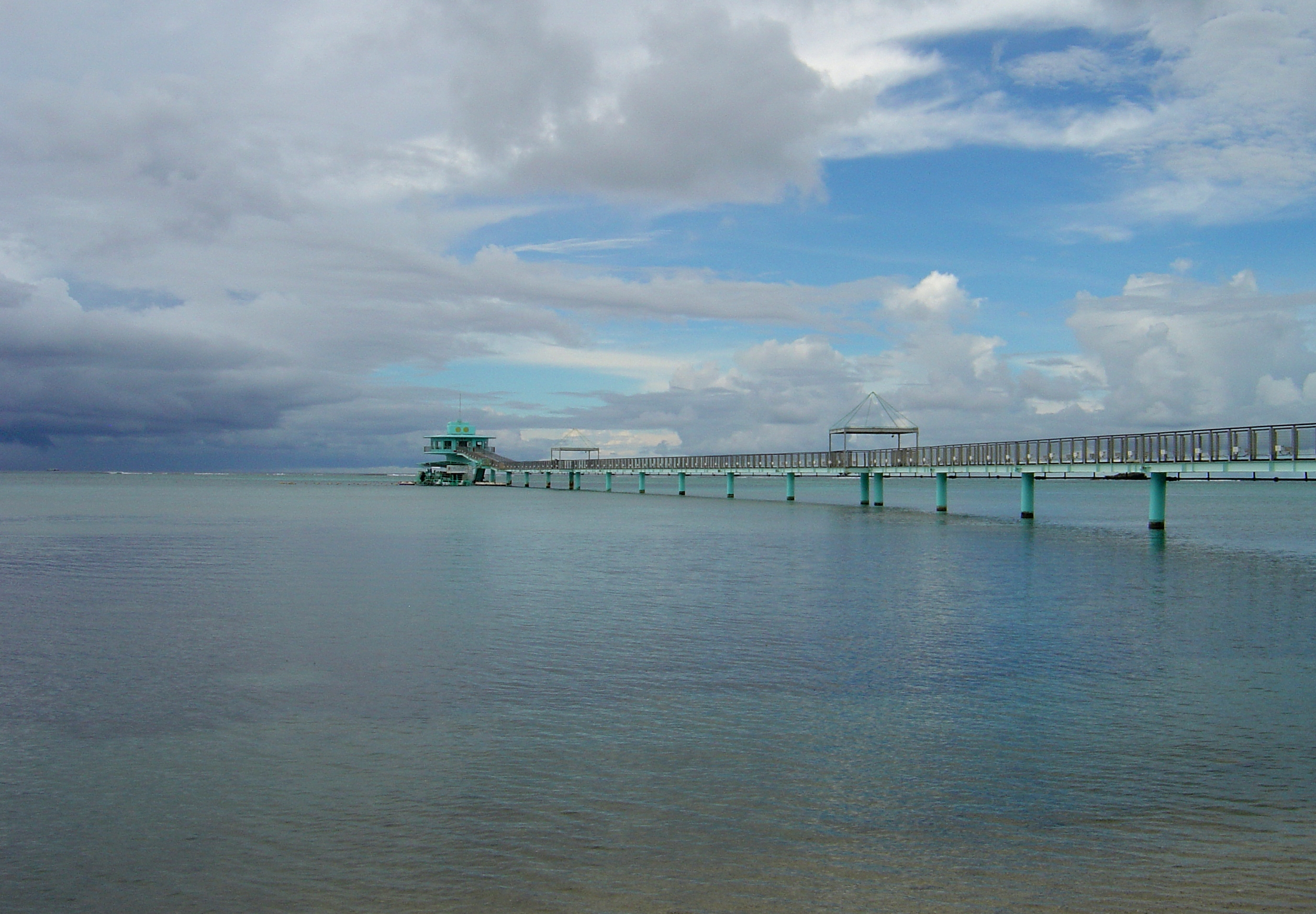
The Fish Eye Marine Park boardwalk to the underwater observatory in the largest "bomb hole"

Unlike Guam's other marine preserves, no fishing of any kind is permitted by default between the Piti shore and outer reef margin. Trolling outward of the reef line is allowed. A 2007 researcher observed many fishermen "fishing the line" in the hopes of catching larger fish coming out of the MPA. The Guam Department of Agriculture periodically declares fishing within the preserve for specified species by specified methods. The 2007 study found that the Piti preserve, compared to the Tumon Bay and Achang Reef Flat Marine Preserves, was the only to create spillover for adjacent fishing areas in all of its studied species, perhaps because it was the only studied area with a continuous reef line. The study found that the Piti Bomb Holes Marine Preserve spillover into the unrestricted fishing area of neighboring Asan Bay for convict surgeonfish, honeycomb grouper, yellowstripe goatfish, orangespine unicornfish, and little spinefoot was +14.1%, +7.5%, +30.8%, +25.4%, and +23.7%, respectively.

Guam's first coral nursery was established at the Piti preserve in 2013 as a joint project of the University of Guam Marine Lab, UnderWater World Guam, and SECORE International. The Piti nursery includes three types of restoration structures: coral tables, A-frames, and coral trees. These structures allow marine biologists to place sexually mature corals next to each other, increases the change of fertilization and new coral growth. A 2019 study noted that there had been significant coral bleaching at Piti Bomb Holes in four of the last five years. The study noted that Sinularia maxima and the hybrid S. maxima x polydactyla were more susceptible to bleaching than Sinularia polydactyla, and it appeared after early events that S. polyactyla would take over the soft coral niches occupied by S. maxima and S. maxima x polydactyla on Guam's back reefs. However, the successive events eventually overcame S. polyactyla's resistance, with the most likely outcome being continued loss of coral structure as a whole. Before 2013, there were no records of Guam reefs bleaching for at least two decades, as Guam seas had experienced normal temperature ranges during the globally devastating 1997–98 El Niño event.

Arrests of fishermen within the Piti Bomb Holes Marine Preserve continue to be made. After a 2020 arrest, Agriculture Director Chelsa Muna-Brecht stated, "The preserves exist to help our reef fish stock replenish, to help our corals recover and thrive, and to ensure our waters are a healthy habitat for our marine life. Each time poachers kill fish and marine life in our (marine preserves), they steal from our community and they risk the health and restoration of our critical ocean habitats."

== Fish Eye Marine Park ==
Fish Eye
- Location: Guam, USA
- Waterbody: Piti Bay
- Nearest land: Piti
- Coordinates: 13.4722°N 144.7035°E
- Dive type: Open-water
- Depth range: 15 to 35 ft (4.6 to 10.7 m)
- Average visibility: 20 to 30 ft (6.1 to 9.1 m)
- Entry type: Shore
- Bottom composition: Rock, coral, sand
- Water: Salt

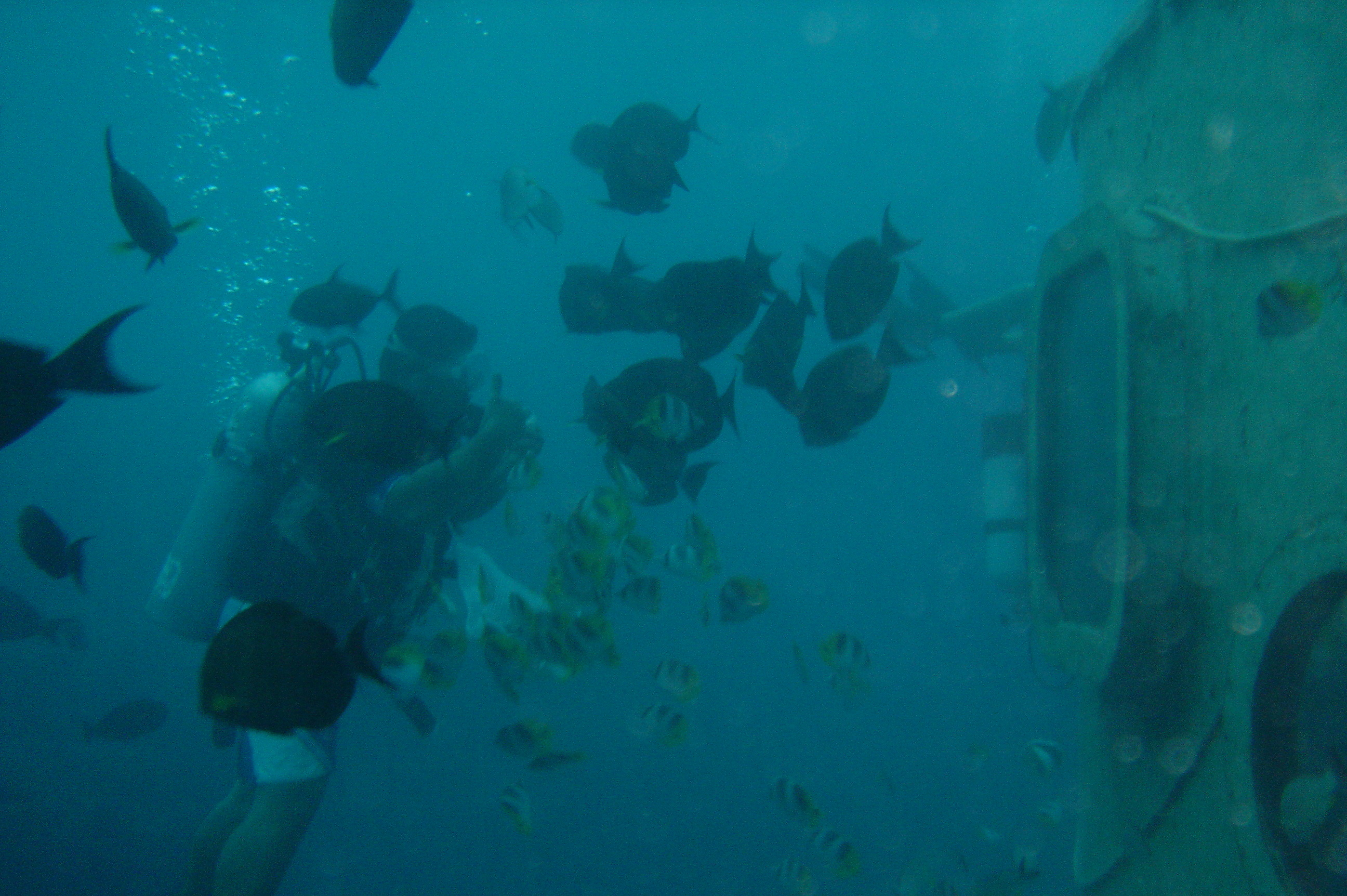
A Fish Eye employee feeding fish to attract them for visitors inside the observatory, 2006

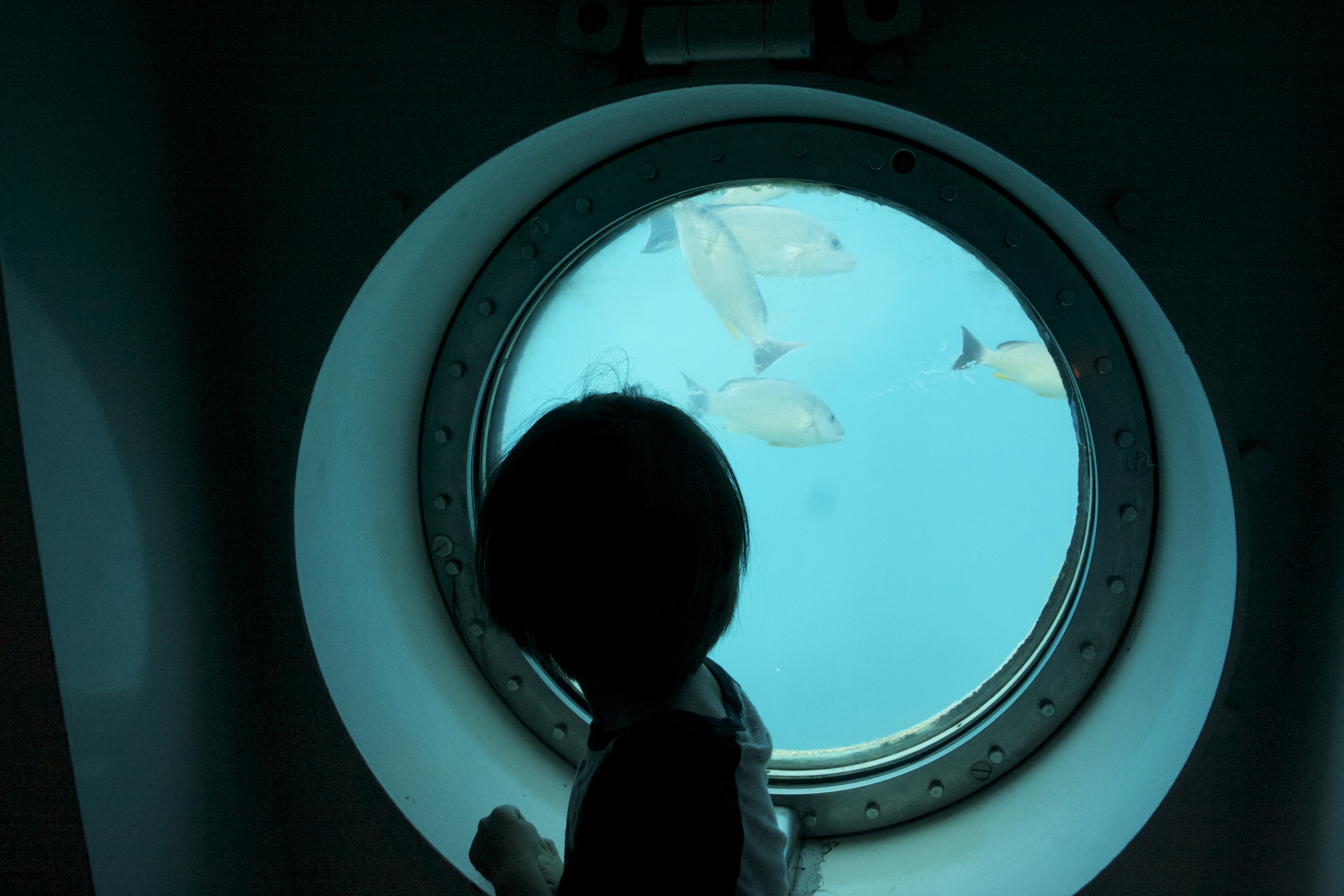
Child watching fish inside the underwater observatory

The underwater observatory at Fish Eye Marine Park was constructed in 1996 in the eastern section of Piti Bay. It is located within the largest "bomb hole" and is the only underwater observatory in Micronesia. It is visited by over 200,000 people annually. The deepest observation window is at about 30 feet (9.1 m) underwater. The observatory is reached by a 1,000 feet (300 m)-long wooden boardwalk. The pier also provided access to the Guam Seawalker business, in which customers put on surface-supplied helmets to look at sea life underwater.

The area around the underwater observatory is a snorkeling and recreational diving site, referred to as Fish Eye, Fisheye, or Piti Bomb Holes. The easy access, protective fringe reef, and shallow sandy bottom of the pit attract many dive classes. Due to both the many inexperienced diver groups and the feeding conducted at both the observatory and Seawalker locations, local fish are not as skittish as usual. The site is thus well suited to underwater photography. Entry is typically done from Tepungan Park, walking or snorkeling out along the right of the pier for 75 yards (69 m), depending on tides. The left of the pier has many seagrasses that are habitat for juvenile fish that may be damaged by walkers. Piti Bomb Holes is a favored spot for introductory night dives; while pier lights are turned off early in the evening, street lighting from Marine Corps Drive along the shore provide some ambient light and easy orientation.

The number of divers at Piti Bomb Holes increased dramatically after access to a third location particularly suitable for dive classes, Outhouse Beach on Apra Harbor, was restricted in 2001. In the aftermath of the September 11, 2001 attacks, Outhouse Beach was deemed too close to critical infrastructure around the Port of Guam. An estimated 50 to 200 dives occurred daily within a 0.25 hectares (0.62 acres) section of Piti Bomb Holes Marine Preserve, putting the number of annual dives at over 18,000. The threshold at which coral damage can rapidly accumulate is 4,000 to 6,000 dives, putting the area hosting the vast majority of divers at severe risk.

== See also ==
- Underwater diving on Guam
