= Pajon =

Pajon may refer to:

- Pajon (surname)
- Pajon River, river in Guam
