= Sumay (disambiguation) =

Sumay may refer to:

- Sumay, Guam, a former village on Guam
- Sumay River, in Guam
- Sumay-ye Beradust District, Iran
- Sumay-ye Jonubi Rural District, Iran
- Sumay-ye Shomali Rural District, Iran
