= Bonia (disambiguation) =

Bonia is a genus of bamboo.

Bonia may also refer to:

- Bonia (fashion), a Malaysian high-end fashion retailer
- Thomas Bonia (1856–1926), a mariner and politician in Newfoundland

== See also ==
- Bonya River, a river in the American territory of Guam
