= Typhoon Chataan =

Pacific typhoon in 2002

Typhoon Chataan (Gloria)
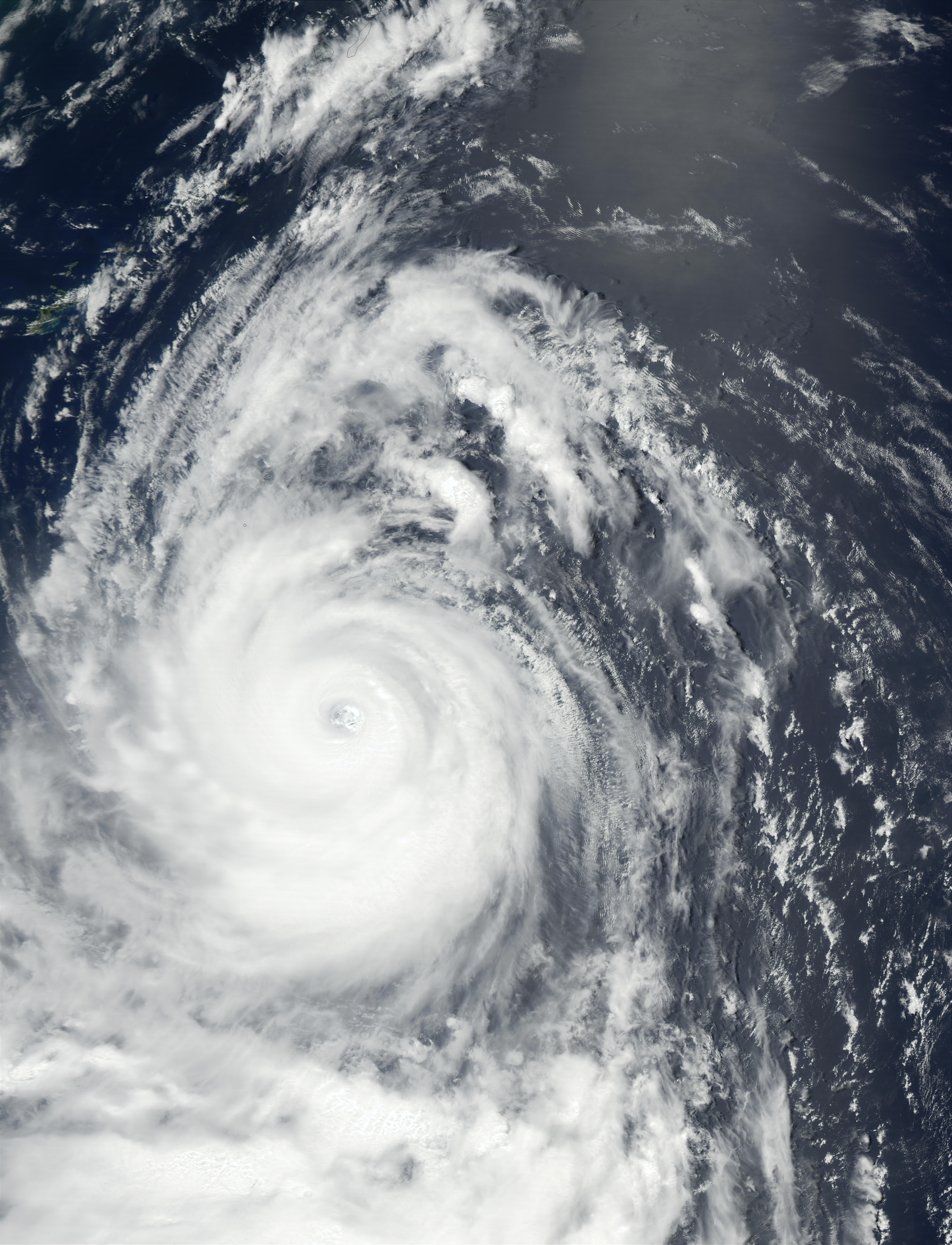
- Typhoon Chataan at peak intensity on July 8

Meteorological history
- Formed: June 27, 2002
- Extratropical: July 11, 2002
- Dissipated: July 13, 2002

Very strong typhoon
- 10-minute sustained (JMA)
- Highest winds: 175 km/h (110 mph)
- Lowest pressure: 930 hPa (mbar); 27.46 inHg

Category 4-equivalent super typhoon
- 1-minute sustained (SSHWS/JTWC)
- Highest winds: 240 km/h (150 mph)
- Lowest pressure: 910 hPa (mbar); 26.87 inHg

Overall effects
- Fatalities: 54 direct
- Missing: 1
- Damage: $660 million (2002 USD)
- Areas affected: Chuuk, Guam, Japan
- IBTrACS
- Part of the 2002 Pacific typhoon season

Typhoon Chataan, (Note: The name Chataan (Chamorro: chata’an, [tsætæʔæn]) was contributed by the United States and means "nonstop rainy day" in Chamorro.) known in the Philippines as Typhoon Gloria, was the deadliest natural disaster in the history of Chuuk, a state in the Federated States of Micronesia (FSM). The typhoon formed on June 28, 2002, near the FSM, and for several days it meandered while producing heavy rainfall across the region. On Chuuk, the highest 24-hour precipitation total was 506 mm (19.9 in), which was greater than the average monthly total. The rain produced floods up to 1.5 m (4.9 ft) deep, causing landslides across the island that killed 47 people. There was also one death on nearby Pohnpei, and damage in the FSM totaled over $100 million. (Note: All damage totals are in 2002 United States dollars unless otherwise noted.)

After affecting the FSM, Chataan began a northwest track as an intensifying typhoon. Its eye passed just north of Guam on July 4, though the eyewall moved across the island and dropped heavy rainfall. Totals were highest in southern Guam, peaking at 536 mm (21.1 in). Flooding and landslides from the storm severely damaged or destroyed 1,994 houses. Damage on the island totaled $60.5 million, and there were 23 injuries. The typhoon also affected Rota in the Northern Marianas Islands with gusty winds and light rainfall. Typhoon Chataan attained its peak intensity of 175 km/h (109 mph) on July 8. It weakened while turning to the north, and after diminishing to a tropical storm Chataan struck eastern Japan on July 10. High rainfall, peaking at 509 mm (20.0 in), flooded 10,270 houses. Damage in Japan totaled about $500 million.

The Philippine Atmospheric, Geophysical and Astronomical Services Administration (PAGASA) named the storm Gloria while the typhoon was in the vicinity of the country.

== Meteorological history ==
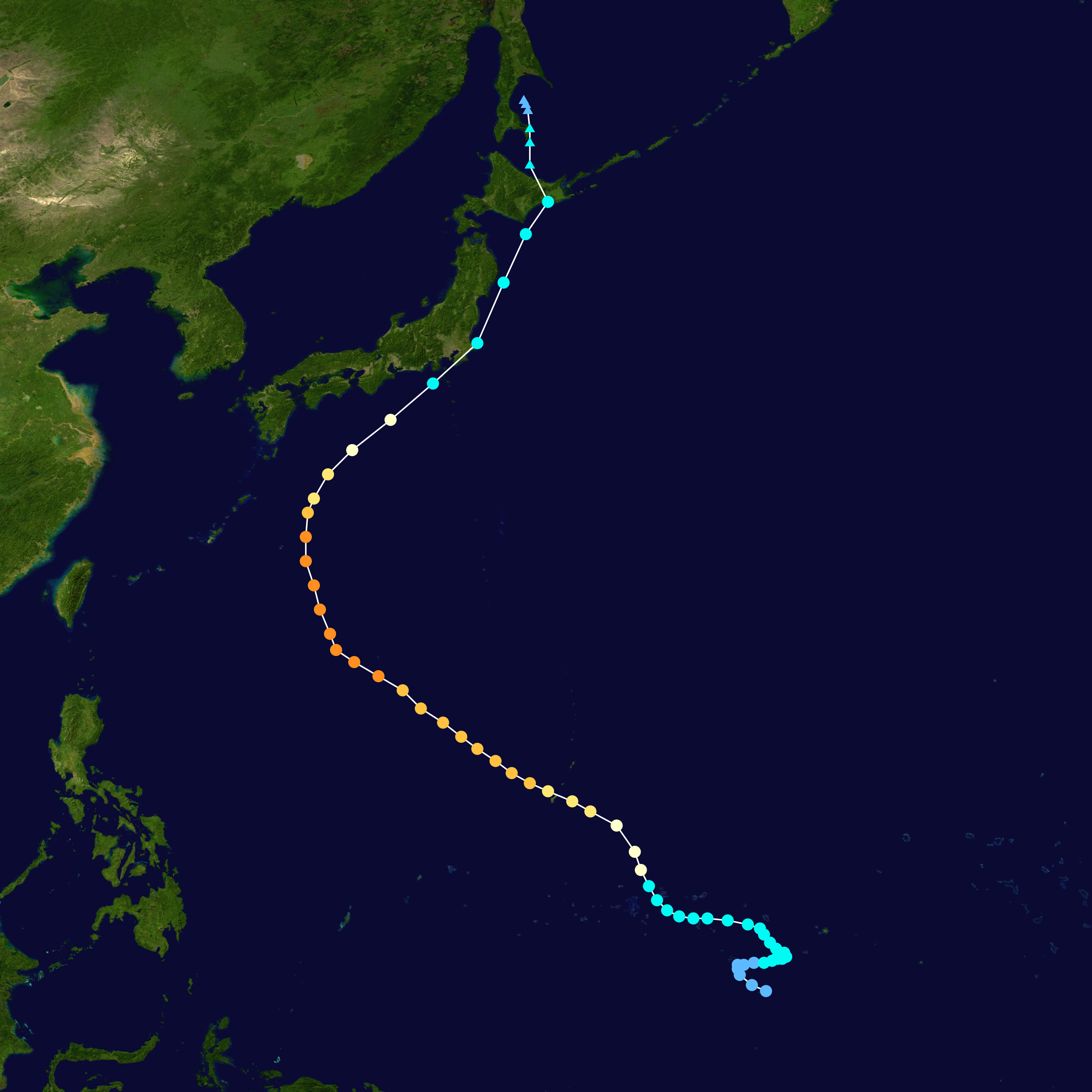
Map plotting the storm's track and intensity, according to the Saffir–Simpson scale Map key Saffir–Simpson scale Tropical depression (≤38 mph, ≤62 km/h) Tropical storm (39–73 mph, 63–118 km/h) Category 1 (74–95 mph, 119–153 km/h) Category 2 (96–110 mph, 154–177 km/h) Category 3 (111–129 mph, 178–208 km/h) Category 4 (130–156 mph, 209–251 km/h) Category 5 (≥157 mph, ≥252 km/h) Unknown Storm type Tropical cyclone Subtropical cyclone Extratropical cyclone, remnant low, tropical disturbance, or monsoon depression

On June 27, 2002, the monsoon trough spawned a tropical disturbance southwest of Pohnpei. The system rapidly organized that day, and at 2000 UTC the Joint Typhoon Warning Center (JTWC) (Note: The Joint Typhoon Warning Center is a joint United States Navy – United States Air Force task force that issues tropical cyclone warnings for the western Pacific Ocean and other regions.) issued a tropical cyclone formation alert. Early on June 28, the Japan Meteorological Agency (JMA) (Note: The Japan Meteorological Agency is the official Regional Specialized Meteorological Center for the western Pacific Ocean.) classified the system as a tropical depression near the Mortlock Islands in the Federated States of Micronesia; around the same time, the JTWC also initiated storm advisories. Early on June 29, the JTWC upgraded the system to Tropical Storm 08W, and shortly thereafter the JMA named the system Tropical Storm Chataan. After moving northwestward, the storm turned to the east, resuming a northwest track on June 30 due to a subtropical ridge to the north. The track was erratic because the storm had not yet separated from the monsoon trough. By June 30, Chataan had steadily strengthened to severe tropical storm status, with 10-minute maximum sustained winds of 95 km/h (59 mph).

Only July 1, the system's circulation became broad, with most of the convection located west of the center. The next day, Chataan briefly weakened to an intensity of 85 km/h (53 mph), although it began strengthening steadily on July 3, when its center passed very near Weno in Chuuk State in the FSM. At 1800 UTC that night, the JTWC upgraded Chataan to a typhoon, and about 24 hours later the JMA followed suit while the storm was approaching Guam from the southeast. At about 2130 UTC on July 4, the eye of Chataan moved across northern Guam in about two hours, although the center of the eye passed north of the island.

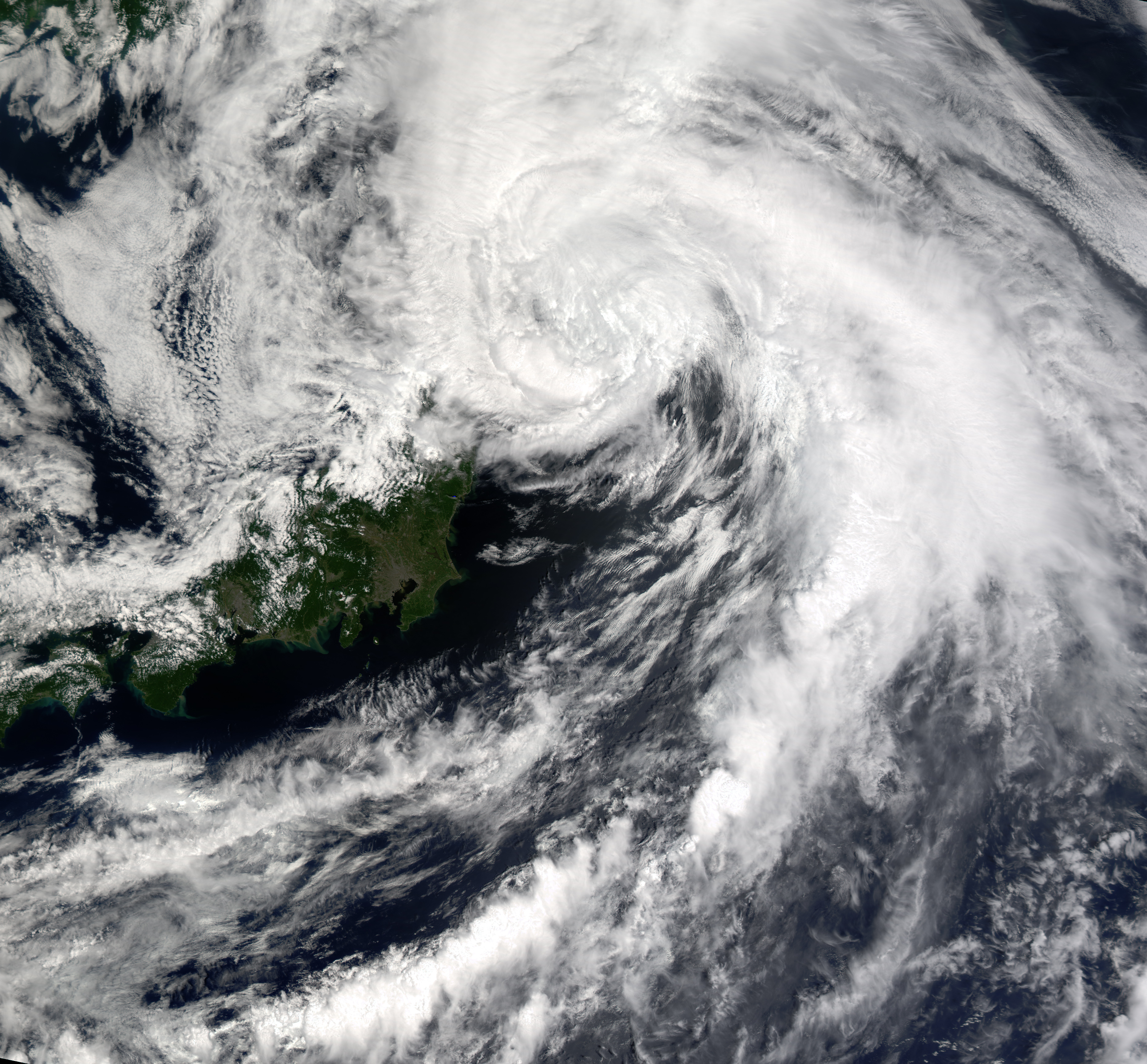
Severe Tropical Storm Chataan brushing eastern Japan on July 11

After affecting Guam, Chataan continued toward the northwest and gradually intensified. At 0000 UTC on July 8, the typhoon reached its peak intensity of 175 km/h (109 mph) 10-minute sustained) while located near the Japanese island of Okinotorishima. The JTWC assessed that Chataan had reached its peak intensity of 240 km/h (150 mph) 1-minute sustained) about six hours earlier; on that basis, the agency classified the system as a super typhoon. On July 8, Chataan turned toward the north around the subtropical ridge while maintaining its peak winds for about 18 hours. On July 9 the typhoon turned to the northeast, and late that day it weakened to a severe tropical storm. At around 1530 UTC on July 10, Chataan made landfall on the Bōsō Peninsula in Honshu with winds of about 100 km/h (62 mph) 10-minute sustained). The storm briefly moved offshore before making a second landfall on eastern Hokkaido at 1200 UTC on July 11; this marked the first occasion of a July landfall on the island in 28 years. A few hours later, Chataan became an extratropical cyclone in the Sea of Okhotsk, where the remnants stalled before dissipating on July 13 near Sakhalin.

== Preparations and impact ==
=== Federated States of Micronesia ===
While Chataan was in its formative stages and still tied to the monsoon trough, it produced a large area of heavy rainfall and strong winds that affected Pohnpei and Chuuk in the FSM. The storm passed very near Chuuk with wind gusts of 82 km/h (51 mph). In the day before Chataan affected the island, it dropped torrential rainfall due to its elongated structure and slow movement. Persistent winds from the larger monsoon trough generated high surf and tides of 0.3 m (0.98 ft) above normal across the region. The most significant effects were from the rainfall, peaking at 954 mm (37.6 in) at the Chuuk Weather Service Office over 13 days. The highest 24-hour total was 506 mm (19.9 in) on Weno Island, of which 361 mm (14.2 in) fell in 12 hours; this was greater than the average monthly rainfall total for the station.

High winds downed power lines on Chuuk, while surf destroyed seawalls and buildings along the coast. The rains causes severe flooding across the island that reached 1.5 m (4.9 ft) in some locations, triggering at least 30 mudslides that killed 47 people. This represented the deadliest natural disaster in the island's recorded history. The landslides reached a depth of 4.6 m (15 ft), which destroyed several homes made of tin and concrete. Many people were buried by the landslides or washed into the ocean. Saltwater flooding contaminated the groundwater and destroyed much of the island's crops. Chataan damaged roads and bridges, and high winds downed power lines, which cut communications between islands. Across Chuuk, the storm destroyed about 1,000 homes and left about 1,000 people homeless. About 100 people were injured.

In nearby Pohnpei state, Chataan produced 72 km/h (45 mph) winds in Nukuoro. The winds destroyed a house and a weather station. Rainfall on the atoll reached 457 mm (18.0 in). High winds, surf, and rain also affected Sapwuafik. Rough seas killed a person on Pohnpei. Crop damage in the country totaled $3 million, and overall property damage was estimated at $100 million, mostly on Chuuk.

=== Guam ===
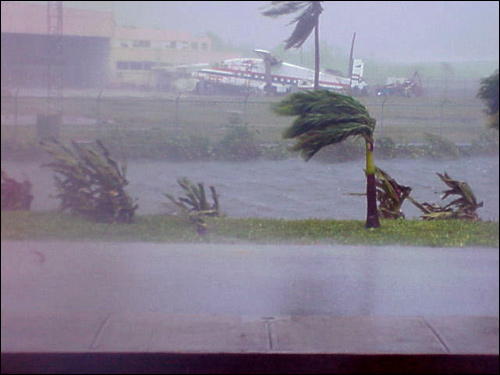
Effects of Typhoon Chataan, including torrential rains and strong winds, on Guam

Before Chataan affected Guam, officials canceled U.S. Independence Day festivities, and residents purchased storm supplies. Although the center of the eye did not strike Guam, the eyewall affected the entire island with strong winds and heavy rainfall. The highest sustained winds were estimated at 120 km/h (75 mph), with gusts to 167 km/h (104 mph) at Andersen Air Force Base. Gusts were slightly higher at Apra Harbor, peaking at 170 km/h (110 mph), and gusts may have reached as high as 200 km/h (120 mph). Similar to its effects on Chuuk, Chataan dropped heavy rainfall on Guam, peaking at 536 mm (21.1 in) on Mount Almagosa; the same station reported 311 mm (12.2 in) in about three hours. The Weather Forecast Office on the island reported 265 mm (10.4 in) in a 24-hour period. The rains were less than 250 mm (9.8 in) in northern Guam, and were highest in the mountainous southern region where the eye crossed. While moving across the island, Chataan produced a significant storm surge that peaked at about 3.6 m (12 ft) in Umatac.

High winds caused damage across Guam, mostly to roofs and to poorly built or wooden structures. A total of 1,996 houses were severely damaged or destroyed. Better constructed homes fared well during the storm, and there was little window damage. The winds also downed power lines, leaving an island-wide power outage. John F. Kennedy High School sustained damage to its football field and library. The most significant effects were from the heavy rainfall, resulting in landslides in some areas and causing rivers to flow at above-normal rates; 14 stations reported either record flow rates or peak crests, including an island-wide peak crest of 8.55 m (28.1 ft) at the mouth of the Tolaeyuus River. Two water gauges were destroyed during the storm. Swollen rivers damaged roads, washed away trees, and caused erosion. The storm flooding contaminated Fena Lake, which provides water to the military base, for a few days. In addition, 34 of the island's 110 water wells failed due to the storm. Flooding also destroyed a building and damaged the runway at Antonio B. Won Pat International Airport, and damaged a bridge near Inarajan. A few palm trees fell due to the soil being loosened, either from heavy rains or high waves. Some of the downed trees struck cars, but the winds were not strong enough to overturn any vehicles. In the higher elevations of Guam, some areas experienced heavy crop damage due to strong winds; however, crop damage in general was less than expected, estimated at $500,000. In Apra Harbor, high seas washed ashore or sank five boats, and a Navy barge spilled 397,000 litres (105,000 gallons) of oil. Overall, Chataan caused about $60 million in property damage on Guam, and there were 23 injuries, none of them serious.

=== Elsewhere ===
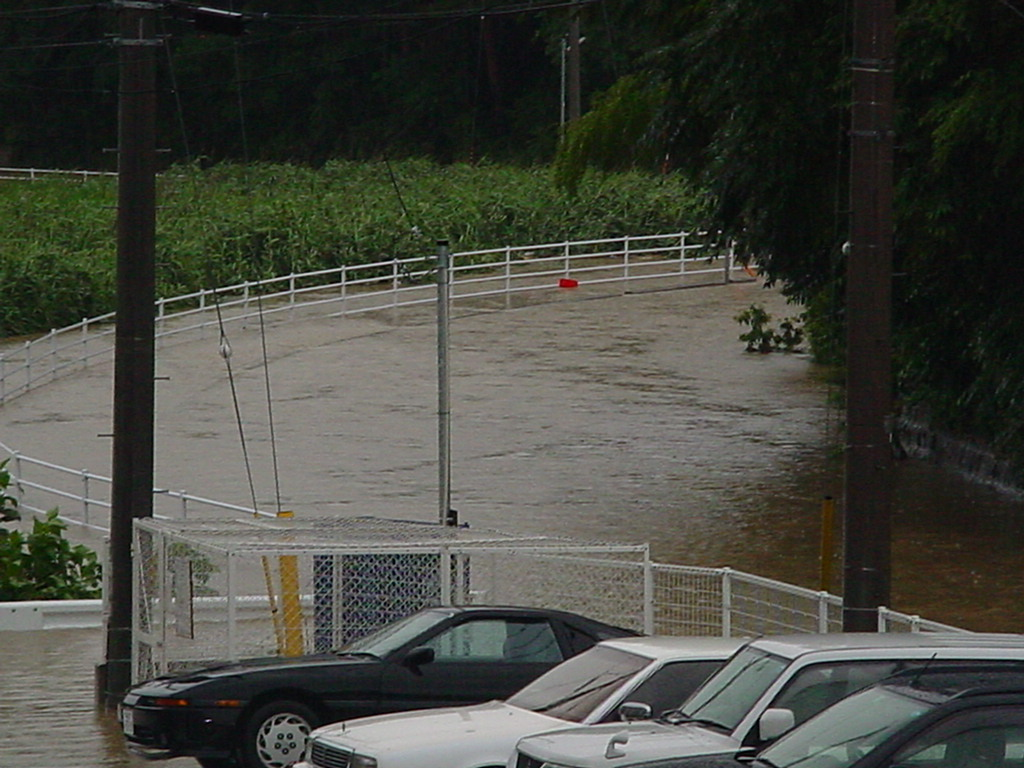
Flood waters from Chataan in Kōriyama, Fukushima

North of Guam, Chataan affected Rota with 74 km/h (46 mph) sustained winds and gusts to 120 km/h (75 mph) at the island's airport. Rainfall was much less than elsewhere in the typhoon's path, and a 24-hour total of 38.6 mm (1.52 in) was reported at Rota's airport. The storm inflicted heavy damage to crops and fisheries, and 60% of farmers reported a total loss. Chataan also damaged roads on the island, many due to fallen trees. Nine huts were destroyed, and damage was estimated at $2.7 million.

Energy from the typhoon enhanced monsoonal moisture over the Philippines, in conjunction with Tropical Storm Nakri. The two storms contributed to heavy rainfall that triggered floods and landslides, which closed roads and highways. High waves killed three people after a boat overturned. The storm destroyed 566 houses and damaged another 2,363. A total of 31,813 people evacuated to 184 government-opened shelters. Officials canceled classes during the system; several schools were used as temporary shelters. Damage totaled over $1.5 million (₱64 million pesos), and the floods killed 58 people.

The last location Chataan affected was Japan. The typhoon forced the cancellation of 316 flights and 150 train trips. The expressway between Shizuoka and Tokyo was closed. At least 396 schools were closed in the country, and a baseball game between the Yokohama DeNA BayStars and the Yakult Swallows was canceled due to the inclement weather. Toyota temporarily closed most of its factories in the country. Heavy rainfall, peaking at 509 mm (20.0 in) in Gifu Prefecture, fell across Japan. The rains flooded 10,270 houses in the country, resulting in evacuation orders for about 145,000 people. The floods damaged roads in 338 locations, and at least 10 bridges were destroyed. About 15,000 evacuees were in Ogaki after a river exceeded its banks. High rainfall caused hundreds of landslides, two of which resulted in a death. Floods killed at least three people. Winds from the typhoon peaked at 97 km/h (60 mph) at Hachijō-jima. High winds in Sakai, Osaka damaged 20 houses. In Tokyo, the storm produced light winds and rains, despite passing within 102 km (63 mi). Chataan destroyed 21 homes and damaged 239 others to some degree. During its passage, the typhoon destroyed 258.6 km^{2} (99.8 sq mi) of crops. The typhoon killed six people, left one person missing, and injured 30 others. Overall damage in Japan totaled about $500 million (¥59 billion 2002 JPY). (Note: The total was originally reported in Yen. Total converted via the Oanda Corporation website.) During the storm, Yahoo! Japan received a record 359 million views, mostly due to people checking the website's weather section.

== Aftermath ==
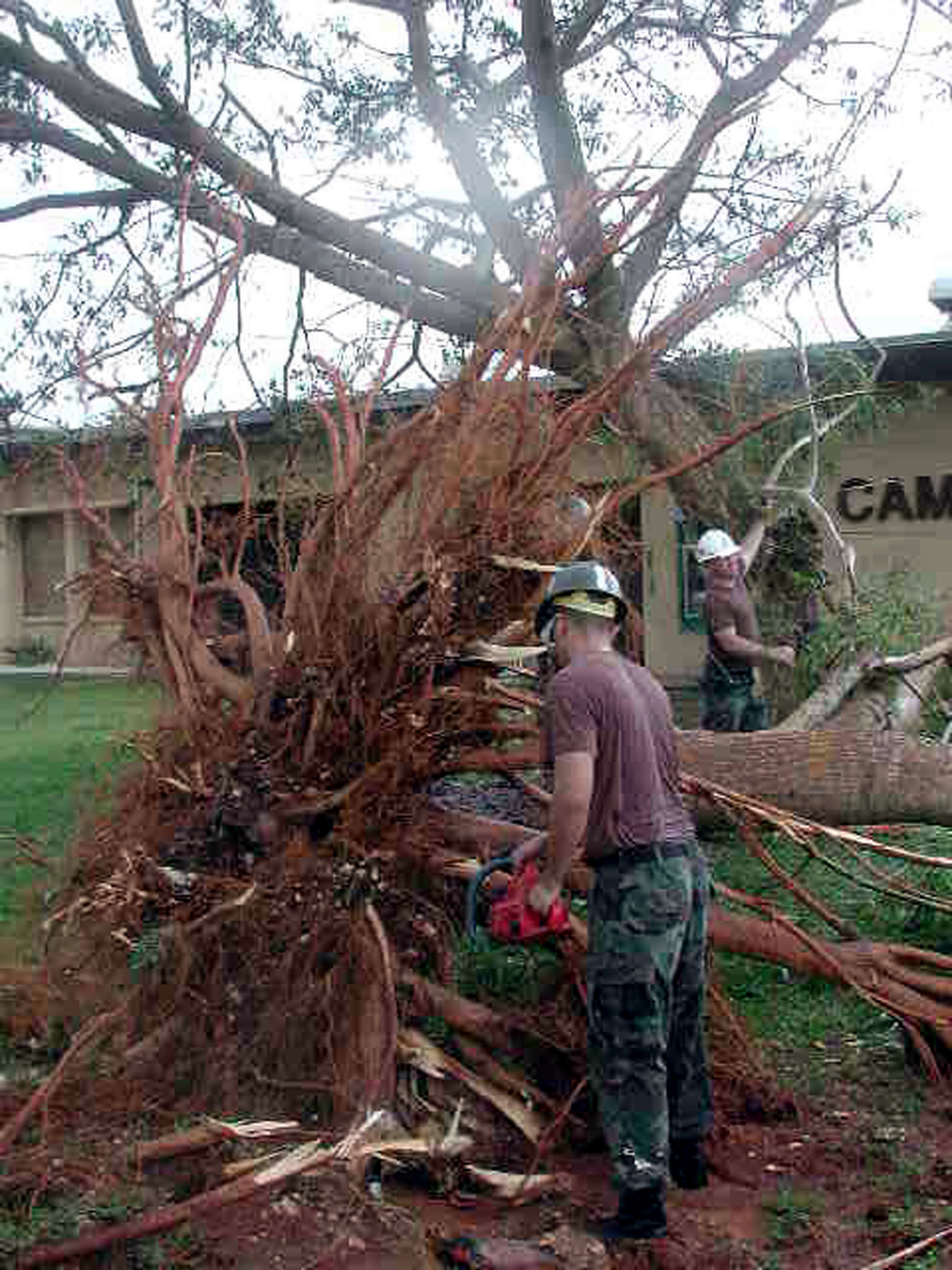
Downed tree on Guam

After Chataan affected Chuuk state, the island's residents were in need of food, clothes and medicine. Only a few crops were not destroyed by the storm; much of the breadfruit was stripped from the trees, and fruit not destroyed by the storm were damaged by parasites. In the days after the storm, the local Red Cross deployed about 100 volunteers to search for victims buried by landslides. However, rescue operations were hampered by persistent flooding after the storm. Initially the death toll was unknown, and it was feared that hundreds of people had been killed. Six people who were seriously injured on Chuuk were flown to The Queen's Medical Center in Hawaii for treatment; they were initially scheduled to fly to Guam Memorial Hospital, but the facility was full. About 2,000 residents affected by the storm evacuated to government-run shelters. The Red Cross shipped various relief supplies, including raincoats and water, to the affected areas. By July 4, power systems were restored and the airport reopened. Although there was enough food in the immediate aftermath, the destruction of crops and cattle posed a long-term food shortage.

On July 3 while Chataan was passing the region, the governor of Chuuk declared a state of emergency, requesting international assistance. On July 9, the government of Japan sent $87,000 (¥10 million) worth of supplies to Micronesia, including 1,000 blankets and 10 electric generators. Two days later, United States President George W. Bush declared the island as a disaster area. This was six days after FSM President Leo Falcam sent the disaster declaration to the US president, although Falcam had improperly filed the paperwork. Because the FSM is in a Compact of Free Association and not a U.S. state, the Federal Emergency Management Agency (FEMA) could not provide immediate assistance. During the delay, a group of doctors from Guam flew to Chuuk to provide medical assistance. On July 11, the government of Israel sent $5,000 worth of medicine to the FSM. The next day, Caritas Australia sent $20,000 worth of water and food. Residents from elsewhere in the FSM sent clothes and food. The Australian government sent $10,000 to replenish emergency supplies, and the International Red Cross released about $20,000 for immediate relief. The government of China sent $30,000 worth of aid. On July 30, FEMA announced that residents and business owners in Chuuk could apply for individual assistance, including money for housing, repairing damage, and low-interest loans. The declaration would not apply to outer islands in Chuuk, which did not sustain significant damage; this is because FEMA only had funds to restore areas to how they were before the storm. Ultimately, FEMA provided 93,000 L (25,000 US gal) of water, 1,300 blankets, 45,360 km (100,000 lbs) of rice, 11,328 meals ready to eat, and various other supplies. In total, the agency allocated $10.6 million, mostly in the form of individual assistance that provided money for purchasing lost supplies. FEMA ultimately sent just under $5 million to Chuuk after Chataan, as well as subsequent typhoons Pongsona and Lupit; however, about $445,000 of the funding was believed to have been misspent due to discrepancies discovered in an audit in 2006.

In the days after the storm, thousands of people on Guam evacuated to the 15 government shelters set up in schools across the island; the total reached 3,947 people on July 10. The governor of Guam declared a state of emergency after the storm, and on July 6 President Bush declared the island a major disaster area; this allocated federal funding to assist in removing debris and other emergency services. A week later, the declaration was extended to include individual assistance for anyone who experienced damage from the storm. The Fena Lake reservoir experienced excess silt deposit after excessive rainfall from Chataan, which prevented water distribution from the facility; on July 19 – fifteen days after the typhoon's landfall – water production resumed. Before the facility reopened, the Guam Waterworks Authority distributed water to the island at differing times of the day to ration the limited supply. However, by a month after the storm, residents were still required to boil water as a precaution. About five days after Chataan struck Guam, Typhoon Halong affected the island and caused further power outages. Some areas on the island remained without power for over a week, due to electric workers restoring the main transmission lines before fixing individual lines. By July 19, 23% of those who lost power still were without electricity, mostly in outlying areas. By that date, trash collection was restored, and government-opened shelters were closed. Later in July, flooding washed debris from Chataan and clogged two rivers. The oil spill in Apra Harbor was cleaned at three of seven affected locations by August 19. In the months after the storm, tourism decreased further after a decline that began after the September 11 attacks. Ultimately, FEMA provided $73 million in assistance to the territory, including $10 million in housing checks to 5,947 people and $6.5 million worth of food stamps for 79,814 people. The agency provided $10 million for debris removal and rebuilding public buildings. In December 2002, Typhoon Pongsona struck Guam and caused additional flooding and damage. On August 7, President George W. Bush also declared Rota to be a disaster area, which provided funding for debris removal.

== Retirement ==
Because of the storm's death toll and damage, the name Chataan became retired and was replaced with Matmo in 2004. Countries in the World Meteorological Organization can request tropical cyclone names to be retired if a storm caused unusually heavy damage., but Matmo was retired after the 2025 Pacific typhoon season and its Replacement name will be announced In 2027.

While the name Gloria was not retired following this storm, it was changed to Glenda in 2005 as PAGASA sought to be apolitical after Gloria Macapagal Arroyo won a disputed presidential election in 2004.

== See also ==
- Other tropical cyclones named Gloria
- List of tropical cyclones near the Equator
- Typhoon Neoguri (2014)
- Typhoon Halong (2002)
