= Ajayan =

Ajayan (Malayalam: അജയൻ) is a Malayali surname, and may refer to

- Ajayan (director), director of the Indian film Perumthachan
- Pulickel Ajayan, nanotechnologist and professor of materials science
- Krishnan Nair Ajayan, Indian footballer

== See also ==
- Ajayan River, a river in Guam
- Ajayan Bay, a bay in Guam
