= Bonya =

The name Bonya may refer to:

== Given name ==
- Rafida Bonya Ahmed, also known as Bonya Ahmed (born 1969), Bangladeshi-American writer, blogger, and humanitarian activist

== Surname ==
- Victoria Bonya (born 1979), Russian beauty influencer, actress and model

== River ==
- The Bonya River, a river in the American territory of Guam.
