= Aguada River =

Location
- Territory: Guam

Physical characteristics
- Source
  - coordinates: 13.4375°N 144.7036111°E
- Mouth
  - coordinates: 13.4391667°N 144.6769444°E

The Aguada River is a river in the United States territory of Guam.

== See also ==
- List of rivers of Guam
