= Yledigao River =

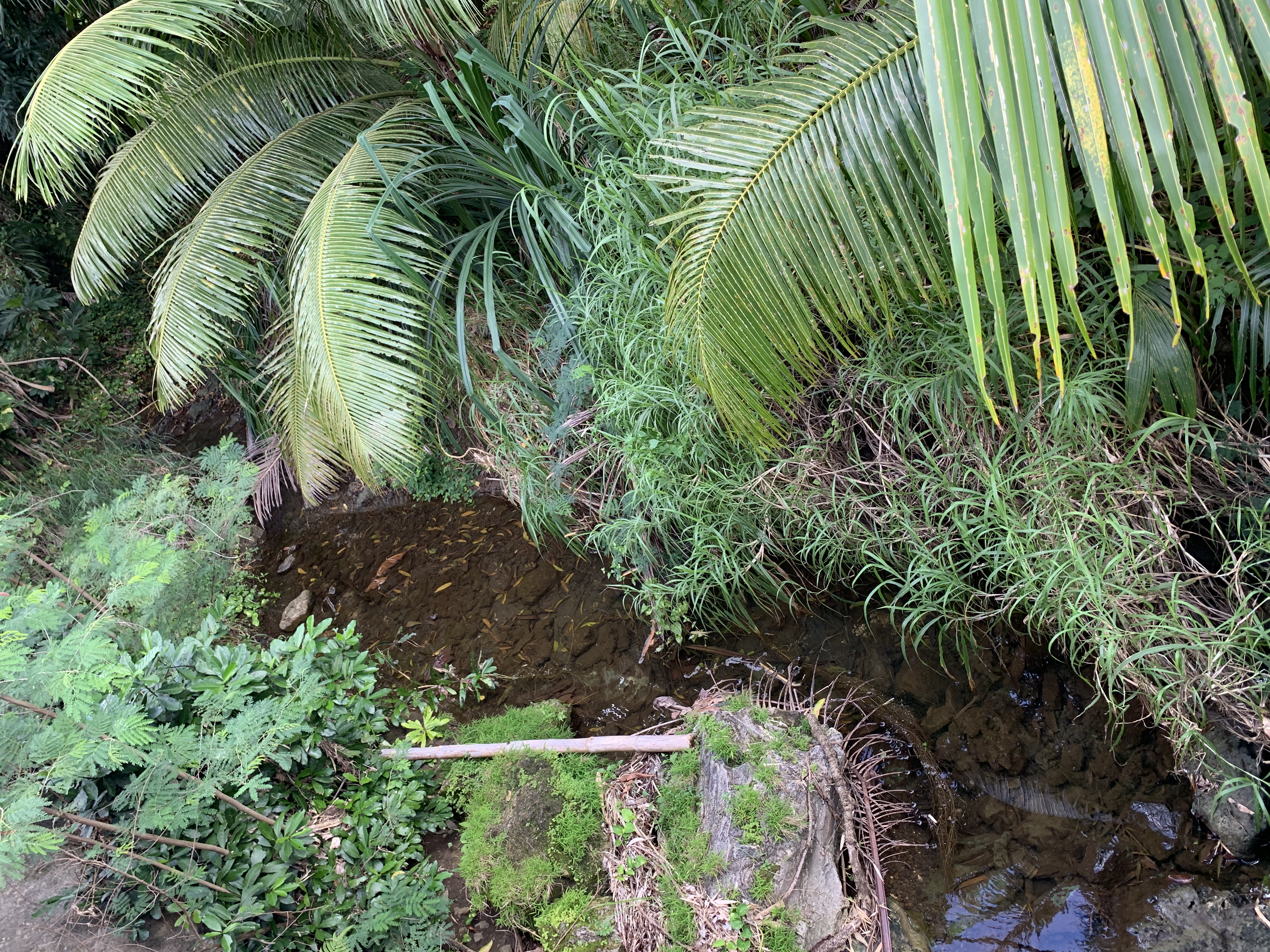

Location
- Country: Guam

Physical characteristics
- Mouth
  - coordinates: 13.2833333°N 144.7233333°E

The Yledigao River is a river in the United States territory of Guam.

== See also ==
- List of rivers of Guam
