= Sagua River =

Location
- Country: Guam

Physical characteristics
- Mouth
  - coordinates: 13.3452778°N 144.6386111°E

The Sagua River is a river in the United States territory of Guam.

== See also ==
- List of rivers of Guam
