= Agfayan River =

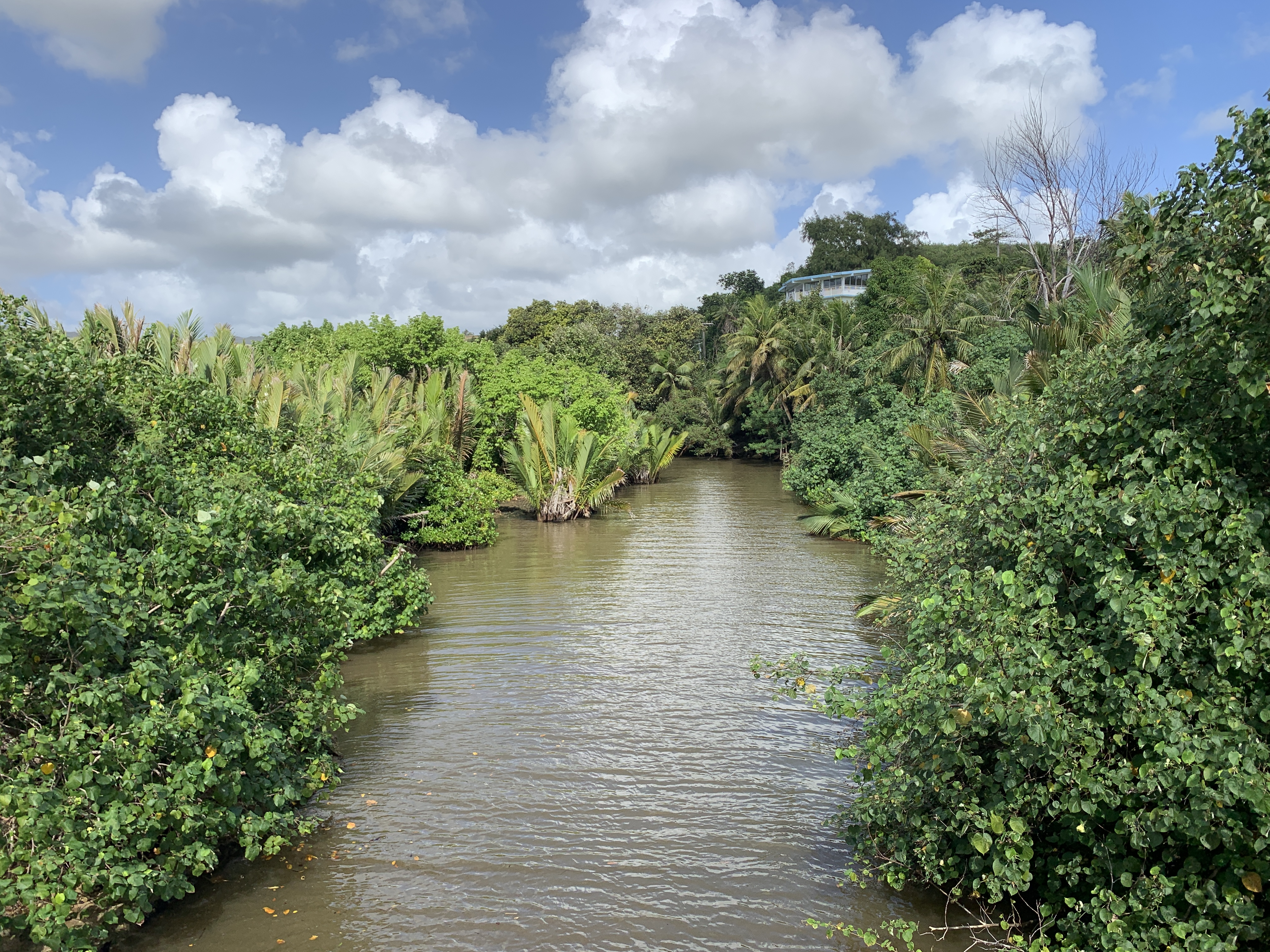

Location
- Country: Guam

Physical characteristics
- Source
  - coordinates: 13.2783333°N 144.6952778°E
- Mouth
  - coordinates: 13.2663889°N 144.7350000°E

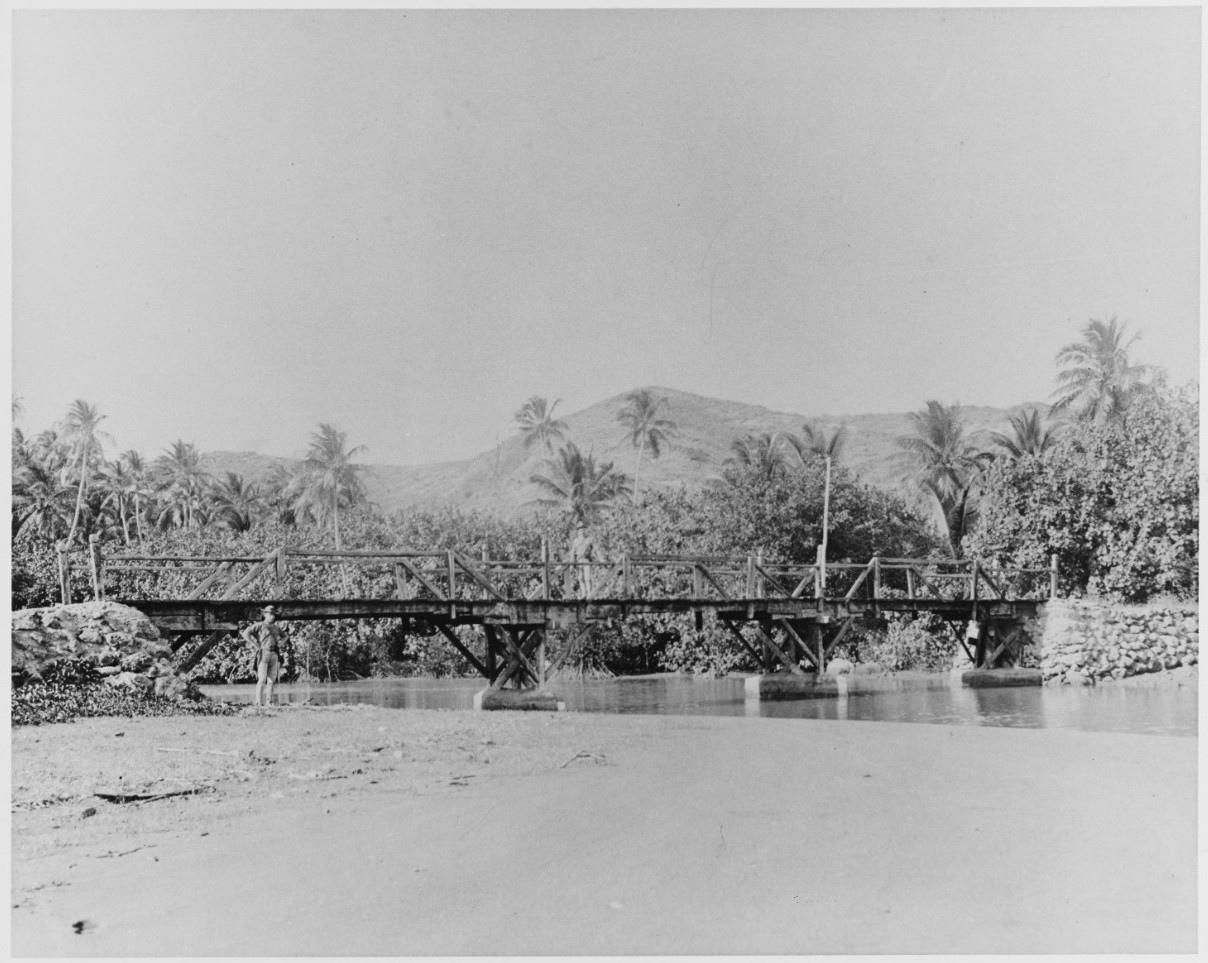
The Agfayan Bridge shortly after its construction, circa 1904

The Agfayan River is a river in the United States territory of Guam.

== See also ==
- List of rivers of Guam
