= Sadog Gago River =

Location
- Country: Guam

Physical characteristics
- Mouth
  - coordinates: 13.3350000°N 144.6941667°E

The Sadog Gago River is a river in the United States territory of Guam.

== See also ==
- List of rivers of Guam
