= Atate River =

Location
- Country: Guam

Physical characteristics
- Source
  - coordinates: 13.2983333°N 144.6880556°E
- Mouth
  - coordinates: 13.2994444°N 144.7027778°E

The Atate River is a river in the United States territory of Guam.

== See also ==
- List of rivers of Guam
