= Tenjo River =

Location
- Country: Guam

Physical characteristics
- Source
  - coordinates: 13.4144444°N 144.6941667°E
- Mouth
  - coordinates: 13.4191667°N 144.6780556°E

The Tenjo River is a river in United States territory of Guam.

== See also ==
- List of rivers of Guam
