= Bolanos River =

Location
- Country: Guam

Physical characteristics
- Mouth
  - coordinates: 13.3013889°N 144.6763889°E

The Bolanos River is a river in the United States territory of Guam.

== See also ==
- List of rivers of Guam
