= Mahlac River =

River in Guam

Location
- Country: Guam

Physical characteristics
- Mouth
  - coordinates: 13.3522222°N 144.7294444°E

The Mahlac River is a river stream in the United States territory of Guam. The river is at an elevation of 98 feet at 13° 21' 08" N 144° 43' 46" E. The Mahlac river lies nearby the Fena Valley reserve.

== See also ==
- List of rivers of Guam
