= Topony River =

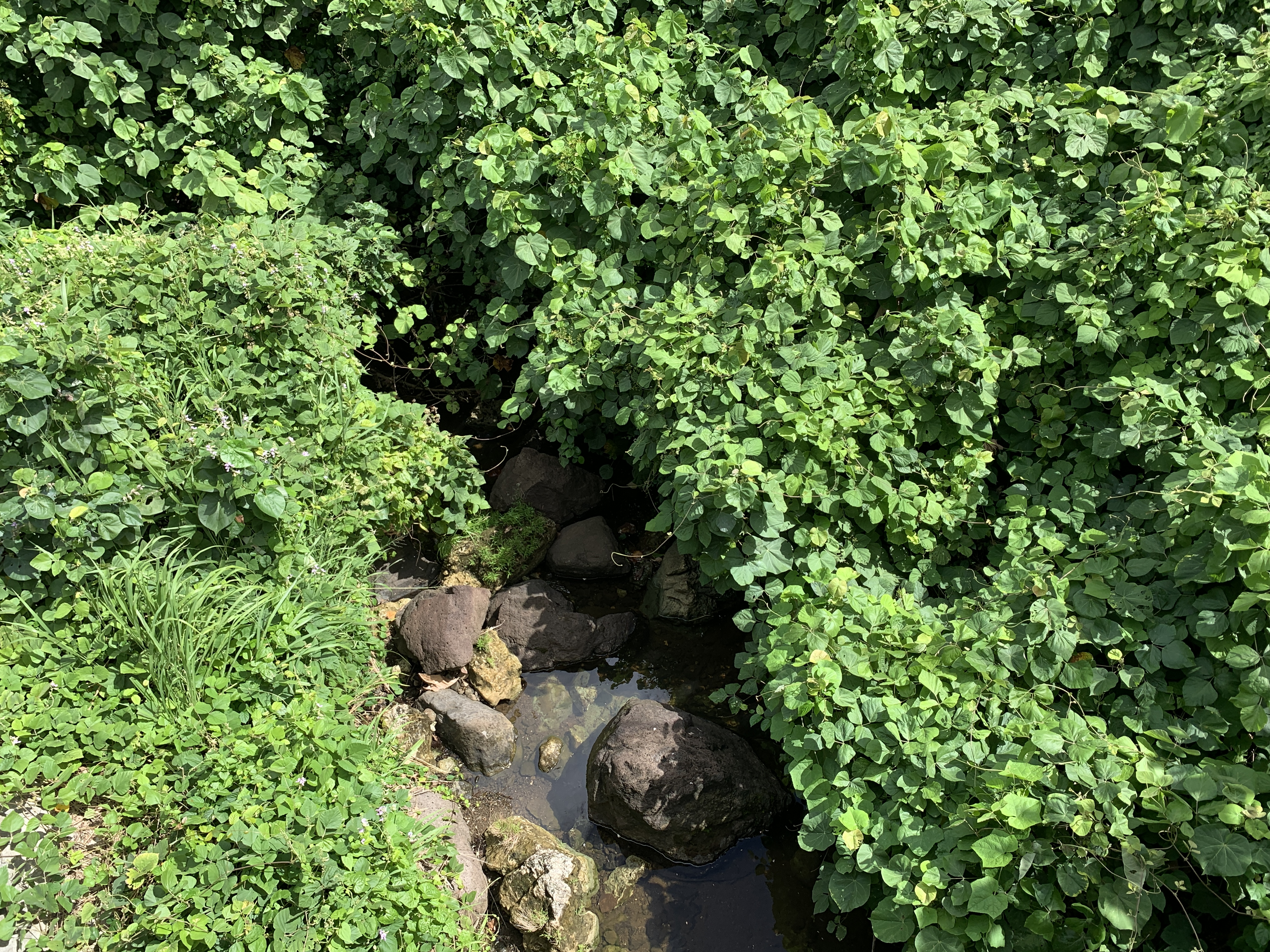

Location
- Country: Guam

Physical characteristics
- Source
  - coordinates: 13.2927778°N 144.7041667°E
- Mouth
  - coordinates: 13.2891667°N 144.7175000°E

The Topony River is a river in the United States territory of Guam.

== See also ==
- List of rivers of Guam
