= Chagame River =

Location
- Country: Guam

Physical characteristics
- Mouth
  - coordinates: 13.3105556°N 144.6722222°E

The Chagame River is a river in the United States territory of Guam.

== See also ==
- List of rivers of Guam
