= Bubulao River =

Location
- Country: Guam

Physical characteristics
- Source
  - coordinates: 13.3027778°N 144.6888889°E
- Mouth
  - coordinates: 13.3188889°N 144.7294444°E

The Bubulao River is a river in the United States territory of Guam.

== See also ==
- List of rivers of Guam
