= Agaga River =

Location
- Country: Guam

Physical characteristics
- Mouth
  - coordinates: 13.3319444°N 144.6452778°E

The Agaga River is a river in United States territory of Guam.

== See also ==
- List of rivers of Guam
