= Umatac River =

River in the United States territory of Guam

Location
- Country: Guam

Physical characteristics
- Mouth
  - coordinates: 13.2966667°N 144.6602778°E

The Umatac River is a river in the United States territory of Guam.

== See also ==
- List of rivers of Guam
