= Fintasa River =

Location
- Country: Guam

Physical characteristics
- Source
  - coordinates: 13.3°N 144.7133333°E
- Mouth
  - coordinates: 13.2852778°N 144.7344444°E

The Fintasa River is a river in the United States territory of Guam.

== See also ==
- List of rivers of Guam
