= Nelansa River =

Location
- Country: Guam

Physical characteristics
- Source
  - coordinates: 13.2986111°N 144.7086111°E
- Mouth
  - coordinates: 13.2894444°N 144.7175000°E

The Nelansa River is a river in the United States territory of Guam.

== See also ==
- List of rivers of Guam
