= Alatgue River =

Location
- Country: Guam

Physical characteristics
- Mouth
  - coordinates: 13.3102778°N 144.6722222°E

The Alatgue River is a river in the United States territory of Guam.

The closest populated place appears to be that of Umatac from which it is 2.01 kilometers away as the crow flies.

It is also 23.60 miles far from the closest airport or heliport, the Guam International Airport.

== See also ==
- List of rivers of Guam
