= List of rivers of Guam =

This is a list of rivers in Guam, a (U.S. territory) in the western Pacific Ocean. The list is arranged alphabetically by the name of the river.

- Agaga River
- Agfayan River
- Aguada River
- Ajayan River
- Alatgue River
- Almagosa River
- Aplacho River
- Asalonso River
- Asan River
- Aslinget River
- Asmafines River
- Astaban River
- Atantano River
- Atate River
- Big Guatali River
- Bile River
- Bolanos River
- Bonya River
- Bubulao River
- Cetti River
- Chagame River
- Chaot River
- Dante River
- Fensol River
- Fintasa River
- Fonte River
- Gaan River
- Gautali River
- Geus River
- Hagåtña River
- Ieygo River
- Imong River
- Inarajan River
- La Sa Fua River
- Laelae River
- Laguan River
- Laguas River
- Laolao River
- Liyog River
- Lonfit River
- Maagas River
- Madofan River
- Madog River
- Maemong River
- Mahlac River
- Malaja River
- Manell River
- Manengon River
- Masso River
- Matgue River
- Maulap River
- Namo River
- Nelansa River
- Pago River
- Pajon River
- Pasamano River
- Paulana River
- Pauliluc River
- Pigua River
- Sadog Gago River
- Sagge River
- Sagua River
- Salinas River
- San Nicolas River
- Sarasa River
- Sasa River
- Sella River
- Sigua River
- Sumay River
- Suyafe River
- Taguag River
- Taleyfac River
- Talisay River
- Talofofo River
- Tarzan River
- Tenjo River
- Tinago River
- Tinechong River
- Togcha River
- Toguan River
- Tolaeyuus River
- Topony River
- Ugum River
- Umatac River
- Yledigao River
- Ylig River

== See also ==
- List of rivers in U.S. insular areas
