= Astaban River =

Location
- Country: Guam

Physical characteristics
- Mouth
  - coordinates: 13.2950000°N 144.6702778°E

The Astaban River is a river in the United States territory of Guam.

== See also ==
- List of rivers of Guam
