= Sasa River =

Location
- Country: Guam

Physical characteristics
- Source
  - coordinates: 13.4377778°N 144.7069444°E
- Mouth
  - coordinates: 13.4497222°N 144.6808333°E

The Sasa River is a river in the United States territory of Guam.

== See also ==
- List of rivers of Guam
