= Asmafines River =

Location
- Country: Guam

Physical characteristics
- Mouth
  - coordinates: 13.3272222°N 144.6491667°E

The Asmafines River is a river in the United States territory of Guam.

== See also ==
- List of rivers of Guam
