= Togcha River =

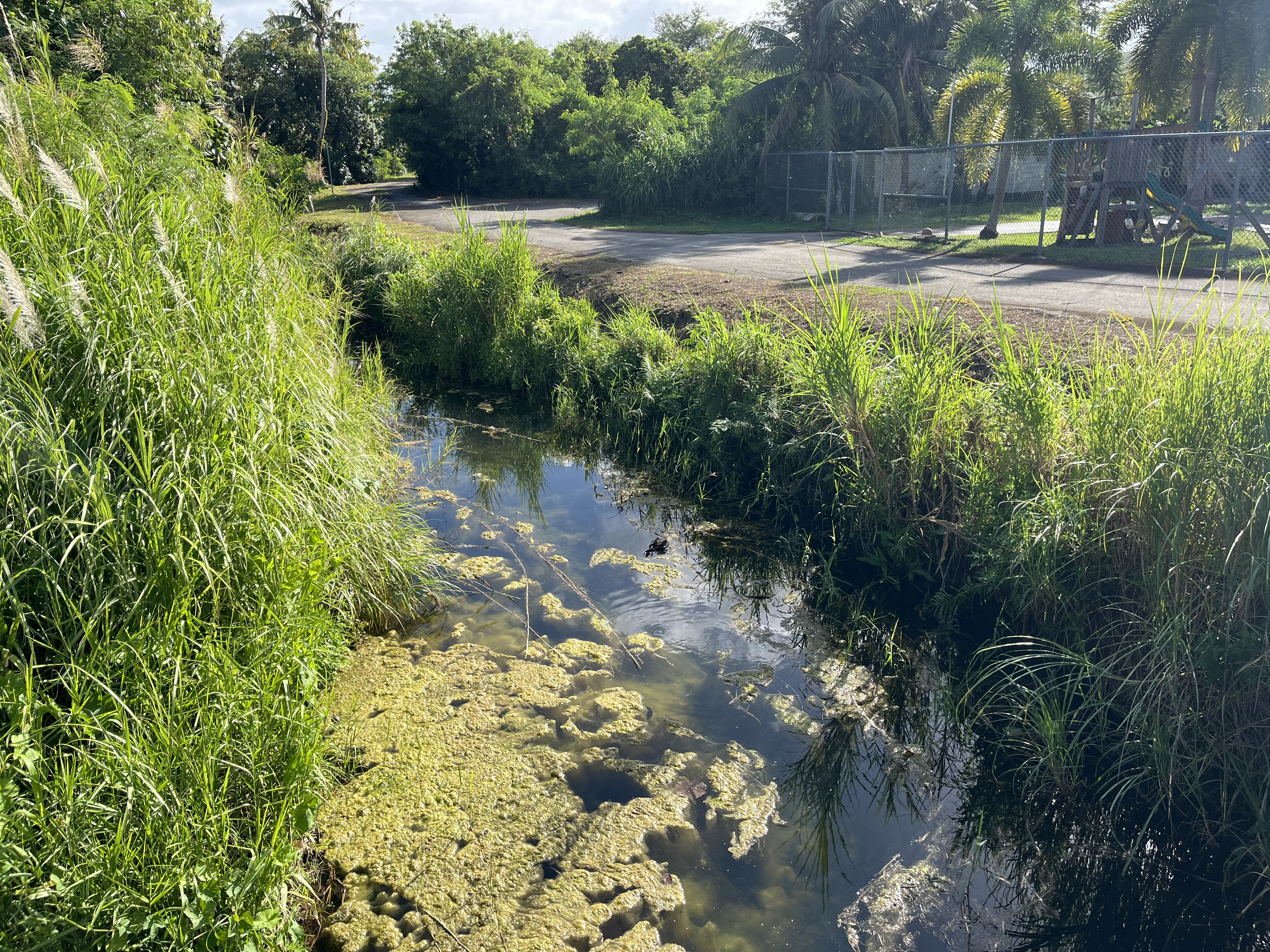

Location
- Country: Guam

Physical characteristics
- Mouth
  - coordinates: 13.3655556°N 144.7669444°E

The Togcha River is a river in village of Yona in the United States territory of Guam.

== See also ==
- List of rivers of Guam
