= Sagge River =

Location
- Country: Guam

Physical characteristics
- Source
  - coordinates: 13.3277778°N 144.6977778°E
- Mouth
  - coordinates: 13.3441667°N 144.7363889°E

The Sagge River is a river in the United States territory of Guam.

== See also ==
- List of rivers of Guam
