= Ieygo River =

Location
- Country: Guam

Physical characteristics
- Source
  - coordinates: 13.2916667°N 144.695°E
- Mouth
  - coordinates: 13.2969444°N 144.6977778°E

The Ieygo River is a river in the United States territory of Guam.

== See also ==
- List of rivers of Guam
