= Madog River =

Location
- Country: Guam

Physical characteristics
- Source
  - coordinates: 13.2877778°N 144.6816667°E
- Mouth
  - coordinates: 13.2969444°N 144.6638889°E

The Madog River is a river in the United States territory of Guam.

== See also ==
- List of rivers of Guam
