= Pigua River =

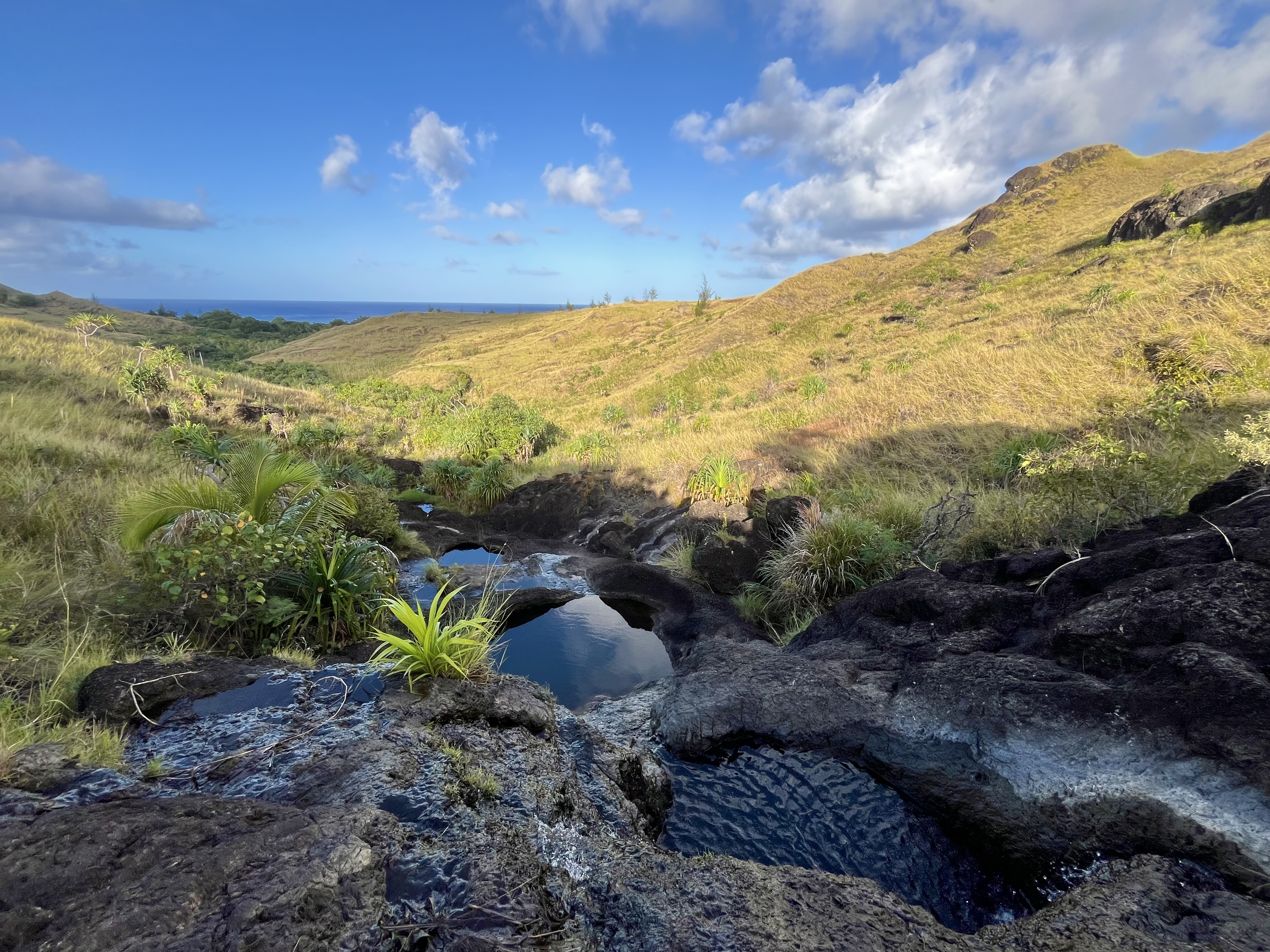
- Priest's Pools, Pigua River

Location
- Country: United States

Physical characteristics
- Mouth
  - coordinates: 13.2741667°N 144.6611111°E

The Pigua River is a river in the United States territory of Guam.

== See also ==
- List of rivers of Guam
