= Talisay River =

Location
- Country: Guam

Physical characteristics
- Source
  - coordinates: 13.3691667°N 144.6730556°E
- Mouth
  - coordinates: 13.3808333°N 144.7044444°E

The Talisay River is a river in the United States territory of Guam.

== See also ==
- List of rivers of Guam
