= Ugum River =

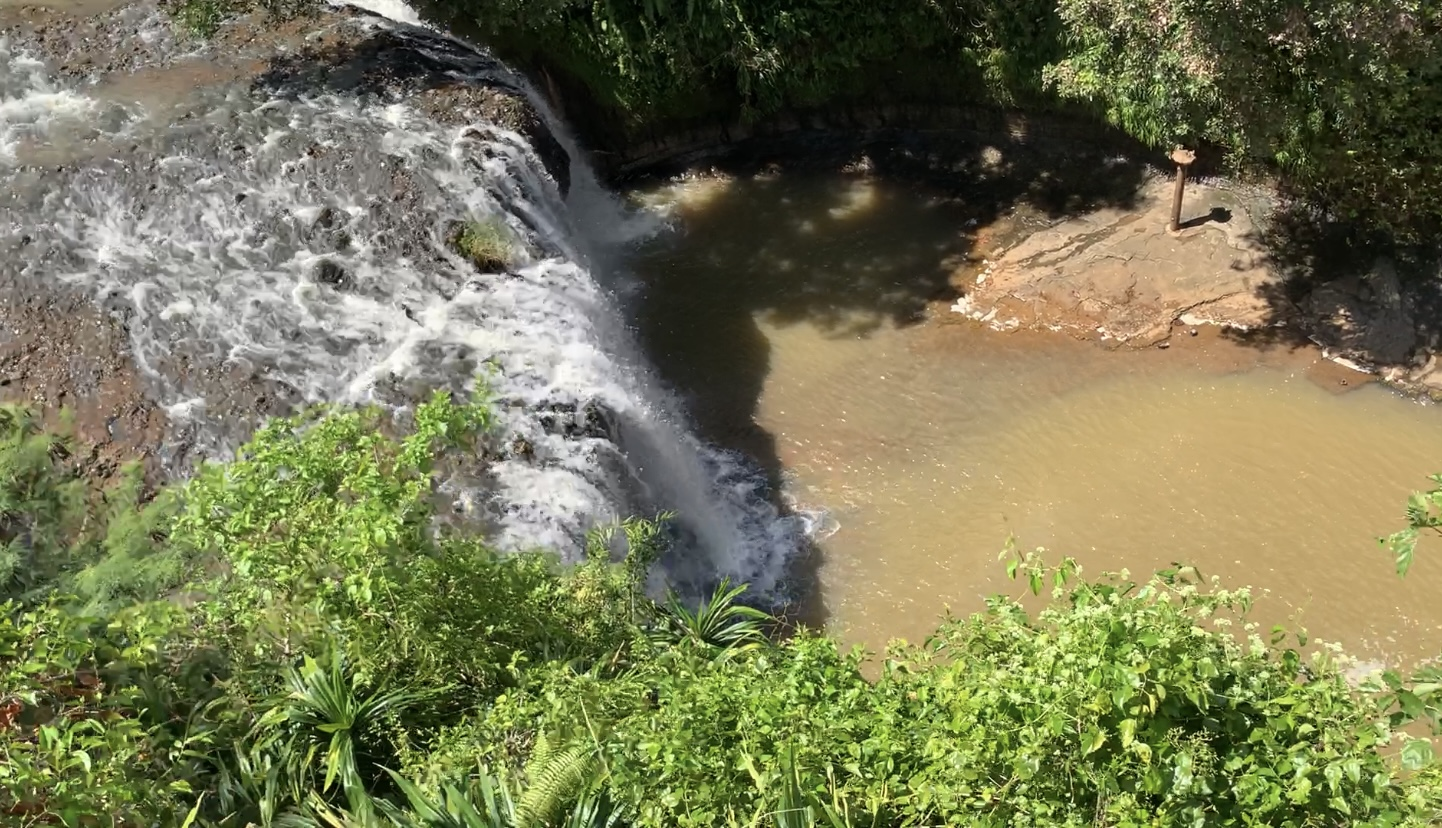

Location
- Country: Guam

Physical characteristics
- Source
  - coordinates: 13.3025°N 144.6933333°E
- Mouth
  - coordinates: 13.3363889°N 144.7516667°E

The Ugum River is a river in the United States territory of Guam.

== See also ==
- List of rivers of Guam
