= Gaan River =

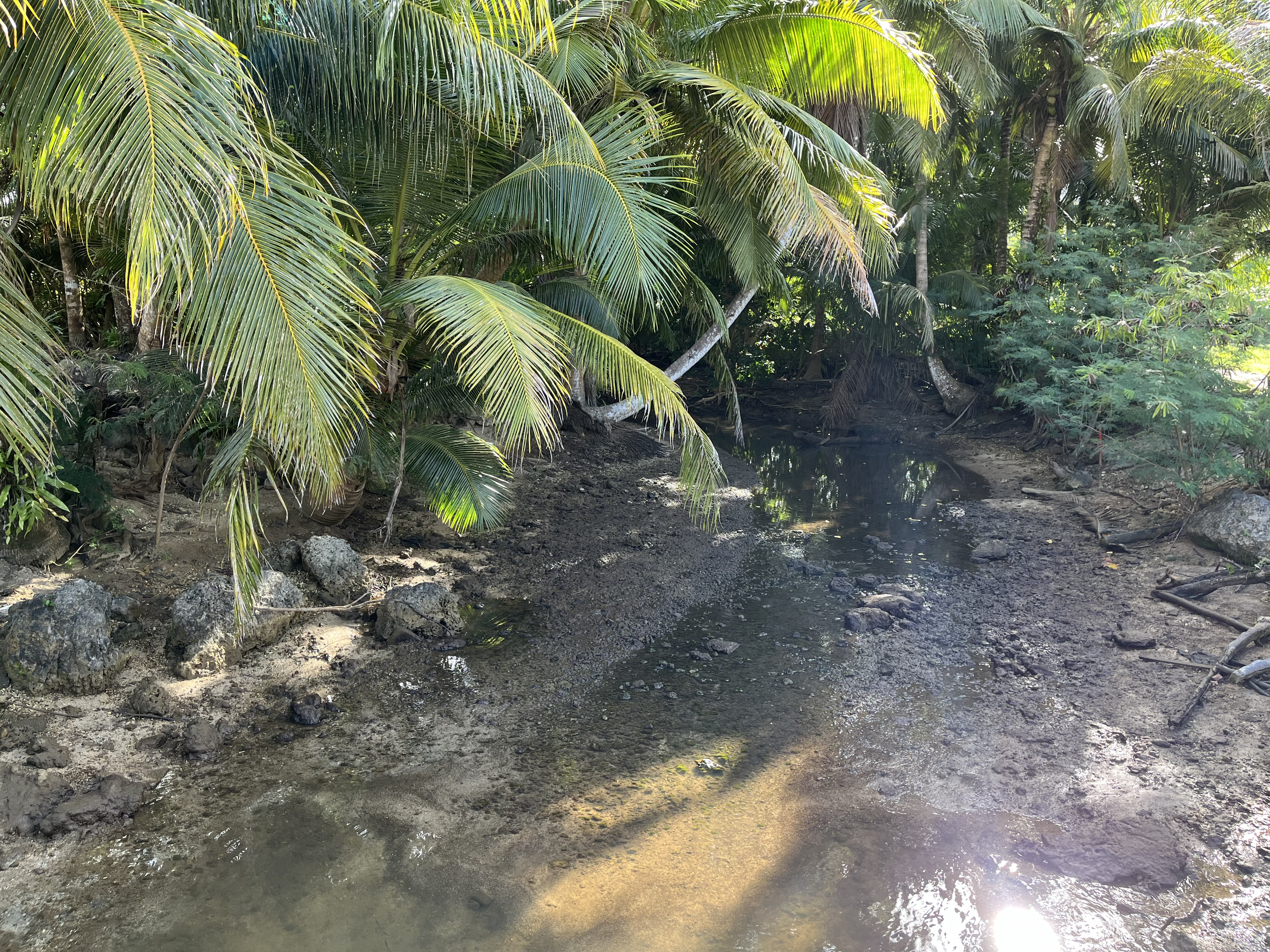

Location
- Country: Guam

Physical characteristics
- Mouth
  - coordinates: 13.3769444°N 144.6491667°E

The Gaan River is a river in the United States territory of Guam.

== See also ==
- List of rivers of Guam
