= Almagosa River =

River in the United States territory of Guam

Location
- Country: Guam

Physical characteristics
- Mouth
  - coordinates: 13.3458333°N 144.6950000°E

The Almagosa River is a river in the United States territory of Guam.

== See also ==
- List of rivers of Guam
