= Dante River =

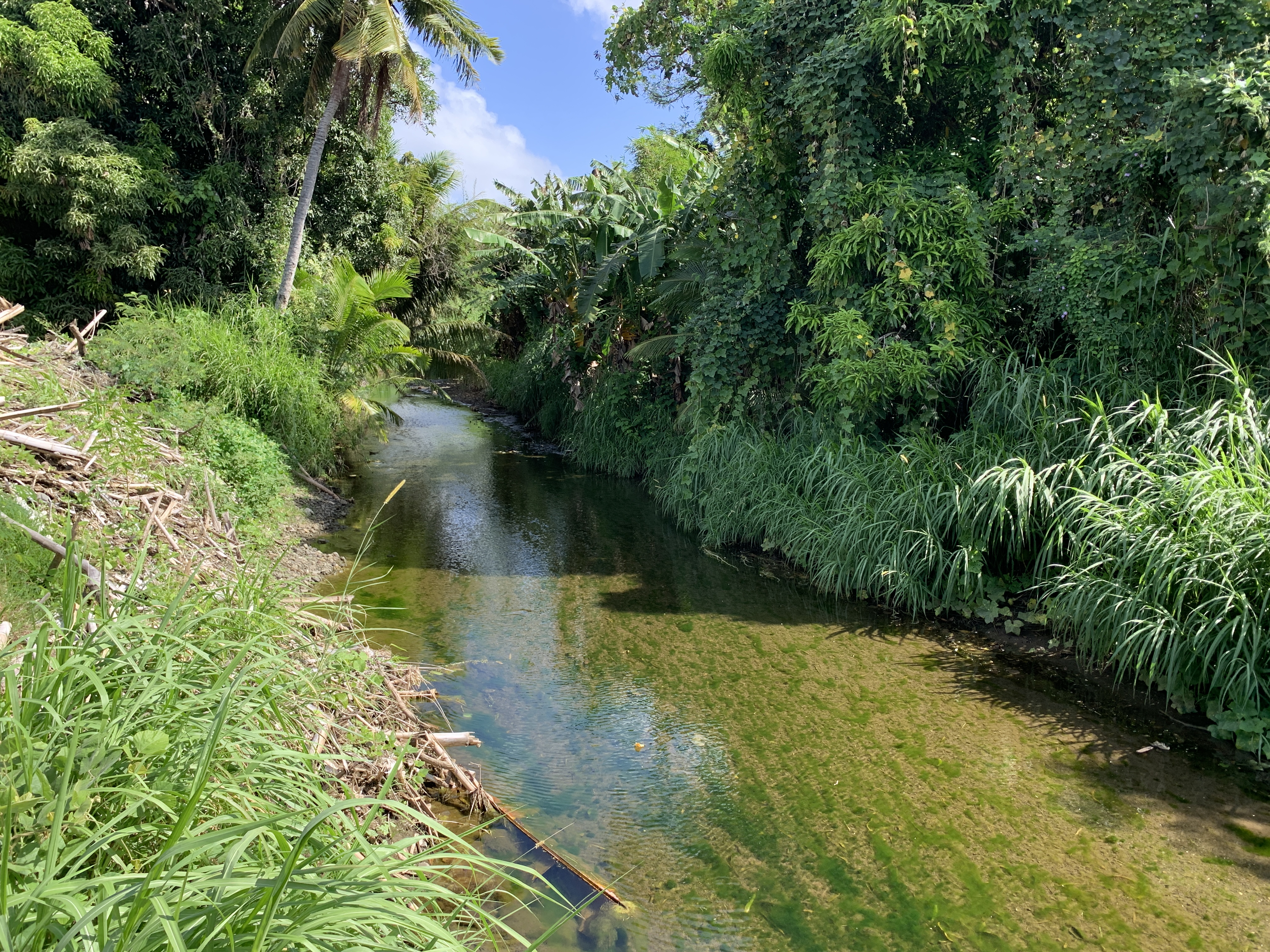

Location
- Country: Guam

Physical characteristics
- Source
  - coordinates: 13.28°N 144.6902778°E
- Mouth
  - coordinates: 13.2816667°N 144.7116667°E

The Dante River is a river in the United States territory of Guam.

== See also ==
- List of rivers of Guam
