= Gautali River =

River in Guam

Location
- Country: Guam

Physical characteristics
- Mouth
  - coordinates: 13.4250000°N 144.6783333°E

The Gautali River is a river in the United States territory of Guam.

== See also ==
- List of rivers of Guam
