= Fensol River =

Location
- Country: Guam

Physical characteristics
- Source
  - coordinates: 13.2972222°N 144.7313889°E
- Mouth
  - coordinates: 13.2850000°N 144.7344444°E

The Fensol River is a river in the United States territory of Guam.

== See also ==
- List of rivers of Guam
