= Maulap River =

Location
- Country: Guam

Physical characteristics
- Source
  - elevation: 34 m (112 ft)
- Mouth
  - coordinates: 13.3544444°N 144.6963889°E

The Maulap River is a river in the United States territory of Guam.

== See also ==
- List of rivers of Guam
