= Inarajan River =

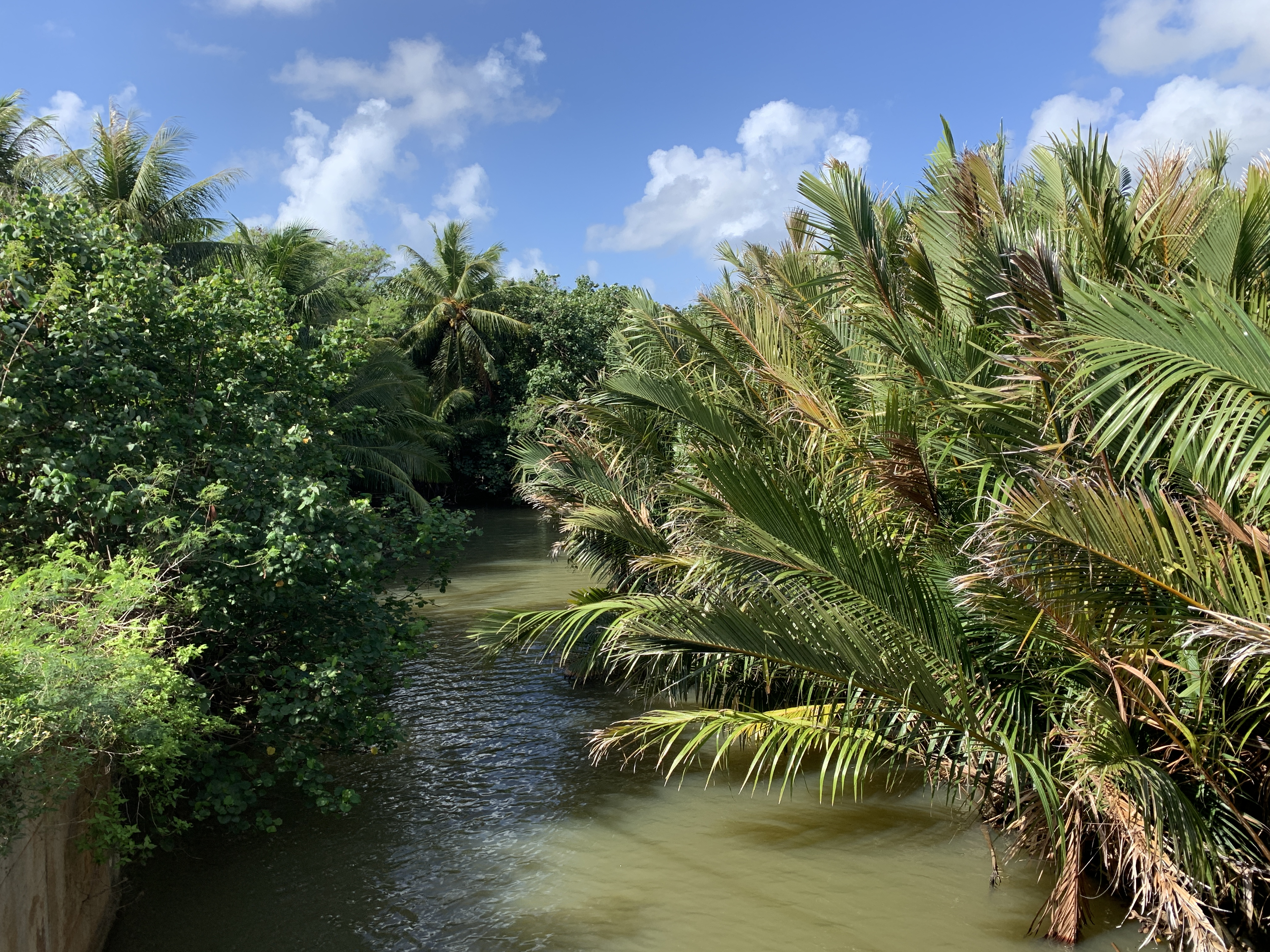

Location
- Country: Guam

Physical characteristics
- Mouth
  - coordinates: 13.2752778°N 144.7447222°E

The Inarajan River is a river in the United States territory of Guam.

== See also ==
- List of rivers of Guam
