= Pasamano River =

Location
- Country: Guam

Physical characteristics
- Source
  - coordinates: 13.2894444°N 144.7°E
- Mouth
  - coordinates: 13.2833333°N 144.7233333°E

The Pasamano River is a river in the United States territory of Guam.

== See also ==
- List of rivers of Guam
