= Manengon River =

Location
- Country: Guam

Physical characteristics
- Mouth
  - coordinates: 13.3983333°N 144.7500000°E
- Length: 14 km

The Manengon River is a river in the United States territory of Guam. The Manengon River is the longest river in Guam.

== See also ==
- List of rivers of Guam
