= Big Guatali River =

- Location within Guam

Location
- Country: Guam

Physical characteristics
- Mouth
  - coordinates: 13.4188889°N 144.6791667°E

The Big Guatali River is a river in the United States territory of Guam.

== Pollution ==
In June 2024, Tristar Terminals Guam, Inc. was found to have discharged oily wastewater into the Big Guatali River which flows into the Apra Harbor. The U.S. Environmental Protection Agency (EPA) announced a settlement with the company concerning the Clean Water Act violation to upgrade the oil-water separation process, conduct regular testing and inspection of wastewater, update the Pollution Prevention Plan, and maintain its petroleum storage facility in Hågat.

== See also ==
- List of rivers of Guam
