= Tinago River =

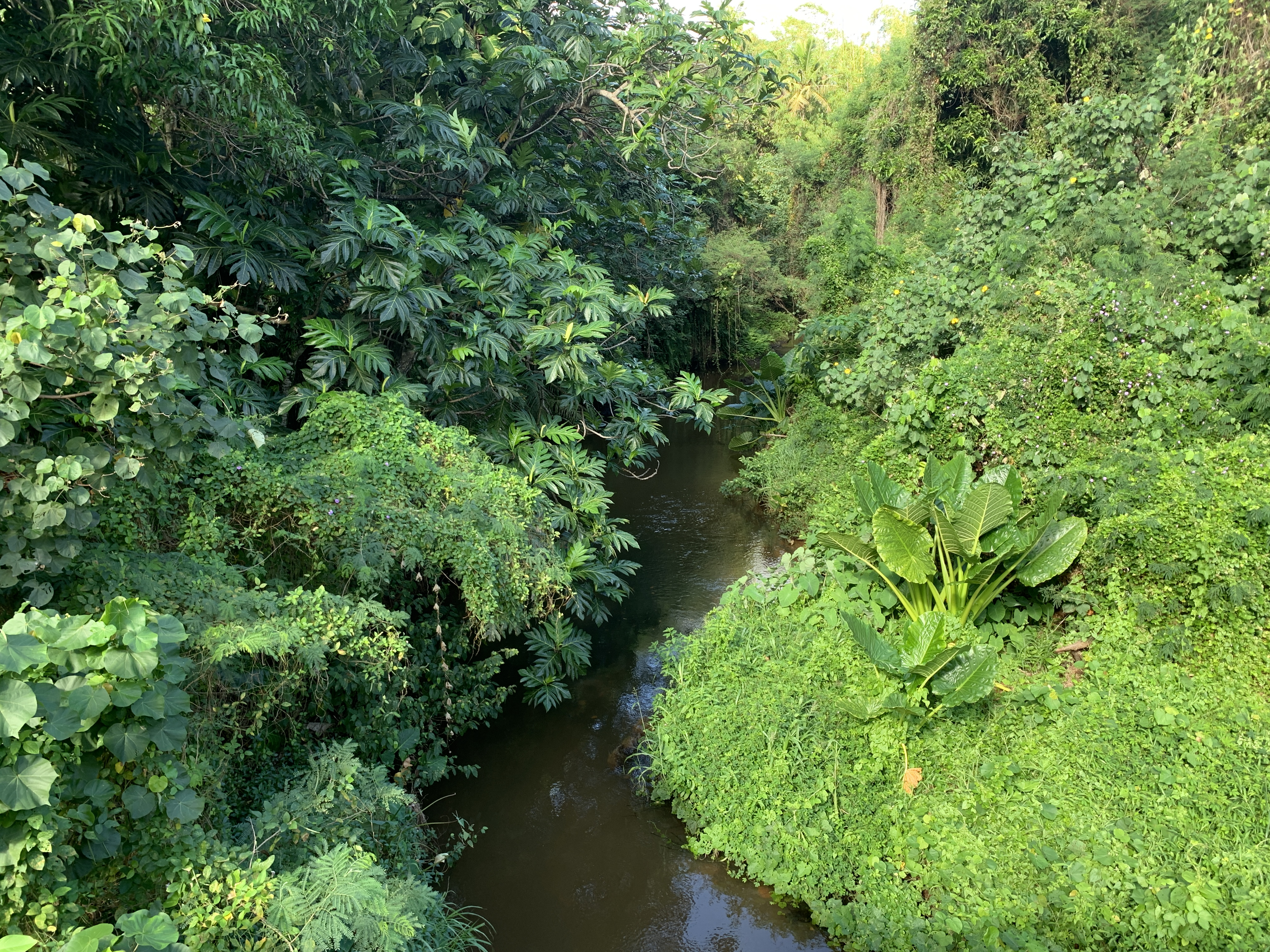

Location
- Country: Guam

Physical characteristics
- Source
  - coordinates: 13.3052778°N 144.7263889°E
- Mouth
  - coordinates: 13.2855556°N 144.7511111°E

The Tinago River is a river in the United States territory of Guam.

== See also ==
- List of rivers of Guam
