= Sumay River =

Location
- Country: Guam

Physical characteristics
- Source
  - coordinates: 13.2572222°N 144.7013889°E
- Mouth
  - coordinates: 13.2463889°N 144.6975000°E

The Sumay River is a river in the United States territory of Guam.

== See also ==
- List of rivers of Guam
