= Pajon River =

River in the United States of America

Coordinates: 13°18′14.7″N 144°40′32.2″E

Location
- Country: Guam

The Pajon River is a river in the United States territory of Guam.

== See also ==
- List of rivers of Guam
