= Ajayan River =

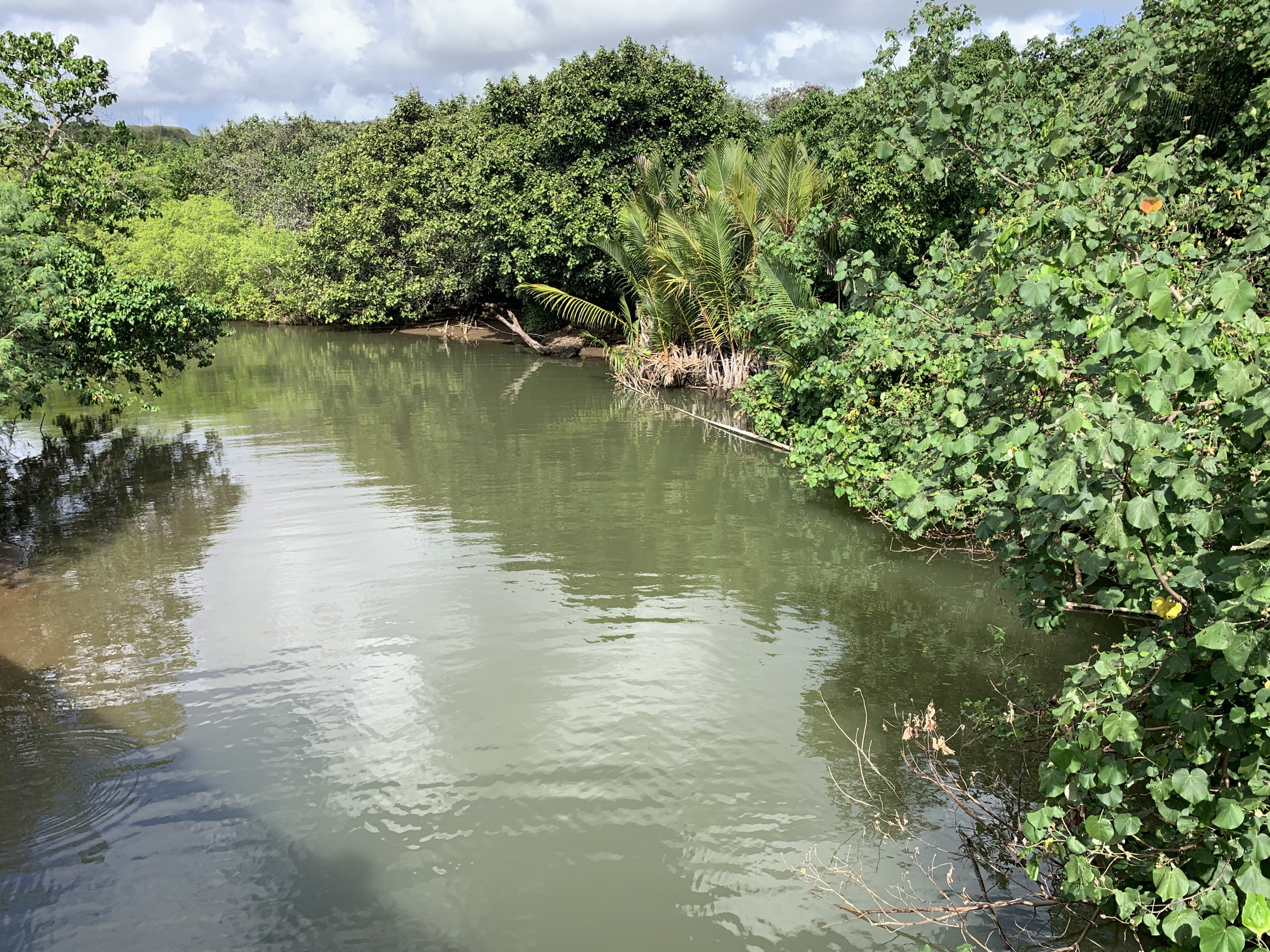

Location
- Country: Guam

Physical characteristics
- Source
  - coordinates: 13.2766667°N 144.6933333°E
- Mouth
  - coordinates: 13.2494°N 144.7167°E

The Ajayan River is a river in the United States territory of Guam.

== See also ==
- List of rivers of Guam
