= Pajon (surname) =

Pajon or Pajón is a surname. Notable people with the surname include:

- Claude Pajon (1626-1685), French theologian
- George Pajon (born 1969), American guitarist, songwriter and record producer
- José Luis Blanco Pajón (born 1956), Mexican politician
- Mariana Pajón (born 1991), Colombian cyclist
- Michel Pajon (born 1949), French politician
