= Matgue River =

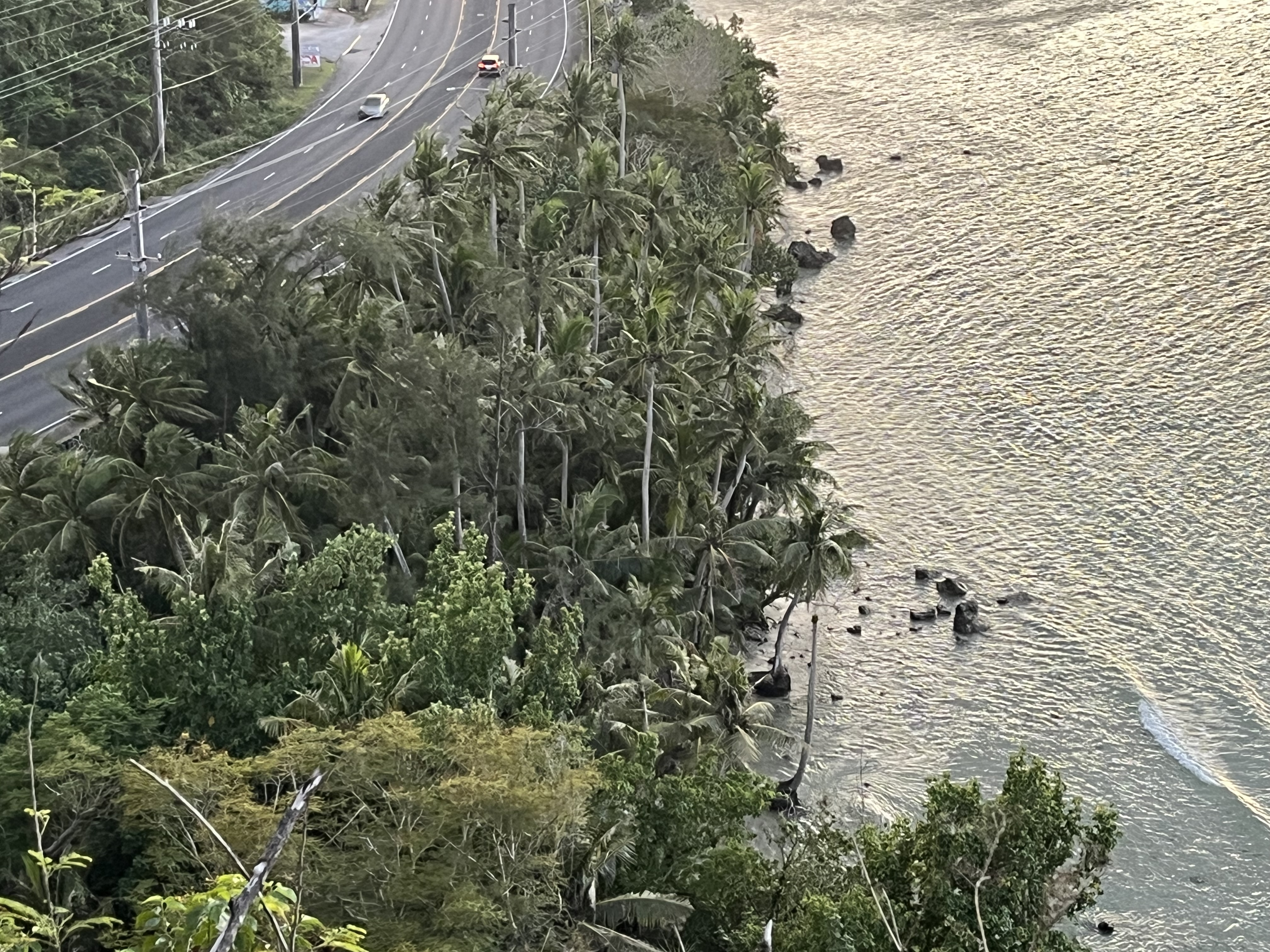
- Mouth of Matgue River

Location
- Country: Guam

Physical characteristics
- Mouth
  - coordinates: 13.4702778°N 144.7041667°E

The Matgue River is a river in the United States territory of Guam. It gives its name to the NRHP-listed Matgue River Valley Battle Area of the 1944 Battle of Guam.

== See also ==
- List of rivers of Guam
