= Masso River =

Location
- Country: Guam

Physical characteristics
- Source
  - coordinates: 13.4491667°N 144.7086111°E
- Mouth
  - coordinates: 13.4638889°N 144.6900000°E

The Masso River is a river in the United States territory of Guam and empties into the western Pacific Ocean.

== See also ==
- List of rivers of Guam
