= Taguag River =

Location
- Country: Guam

Physical characteristics
- Mouth
  - coordinates: 13.4647222°N 144.6936111°E

The Taguag River is a river in the United States territory of Guam.

== See also ==
- List of rivers of Guam
