= Bonya River =

Location
- Country: Guam

Physical characteristics
- Source
  - coordinates: 13.3613889°N 144.6761111°E
- Mouth
  - coordinates: 13.3655556°N 144.7116667°E

The Bonya River is a river in the American territory of Guam.

== See also ==
- List of rivers of Guam
