= Underwater diving in Guam =

Recreational diving tourism destination

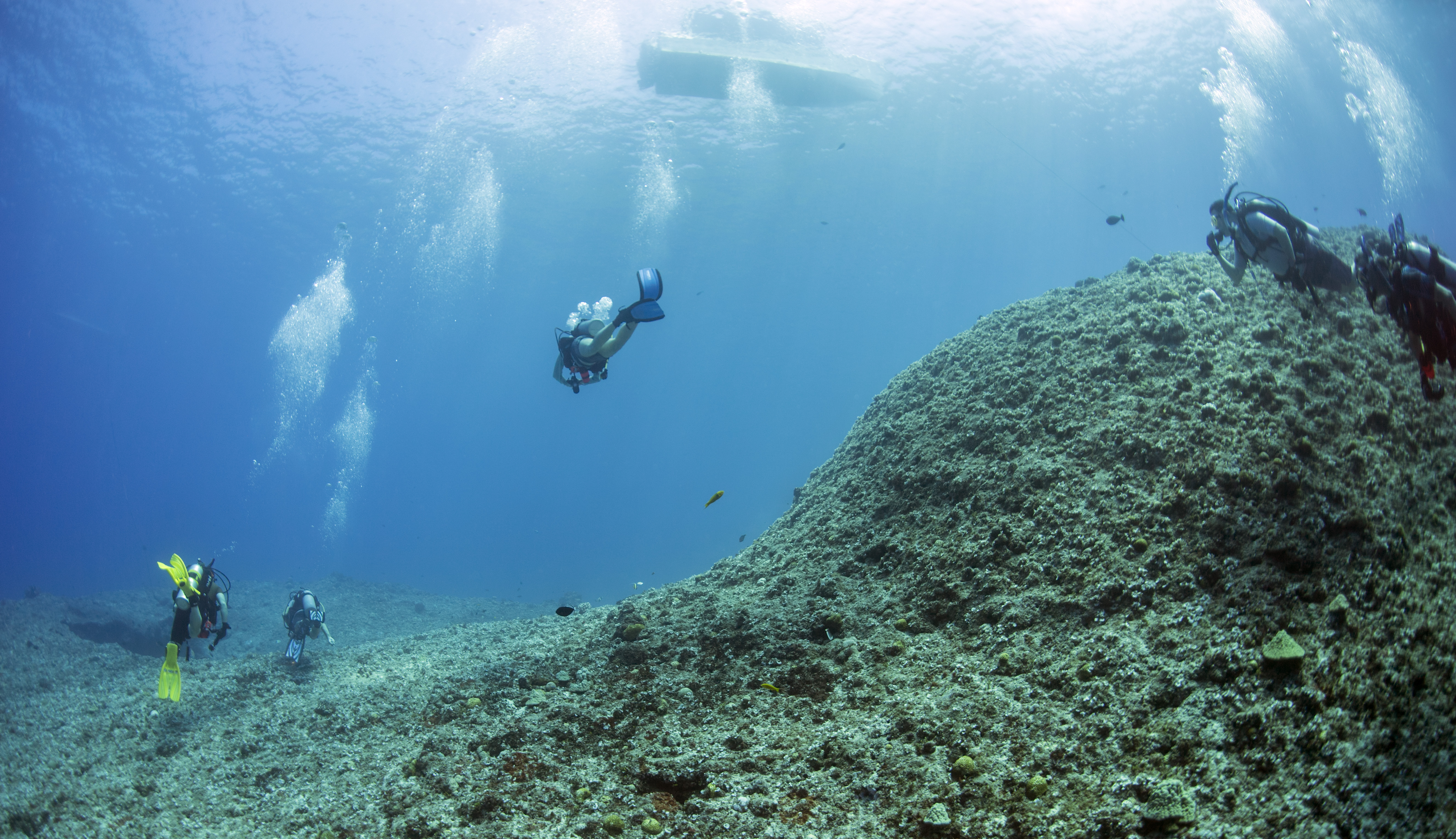
Divers at Blue Hole, one of the most popular dive sites on Guam

Underwater diving encompasses a variety of economically and culturally significant forms of diving on the U.S. island territory of Guam. Scuba diving tourism is a significant component of the island's tourist activity, in particular for visitors from Japan and South Korea. Recreational diving by Guam residents has a lesser but still substantial economic impact. Marine biologists have raised concerns about the effect of diving upon the health of some of Guam's reefs. Recreational dive sites on Guam include submerged shipwrecks, such as the double wrecks of SMS Cormoran and Tokai Maru, and natural features, such as Blue Hole.

Freedive spearfishing is a culturally and economically important activity for Guam residents, with a history extending to the pre-Spanish Chamorro people. Guam is well represented in local and regional spearfishing competitions. Scuba spearfishing was banned by law in March 2020, after over ten years of resistance from local fishing groups.

== Recreational diving ==
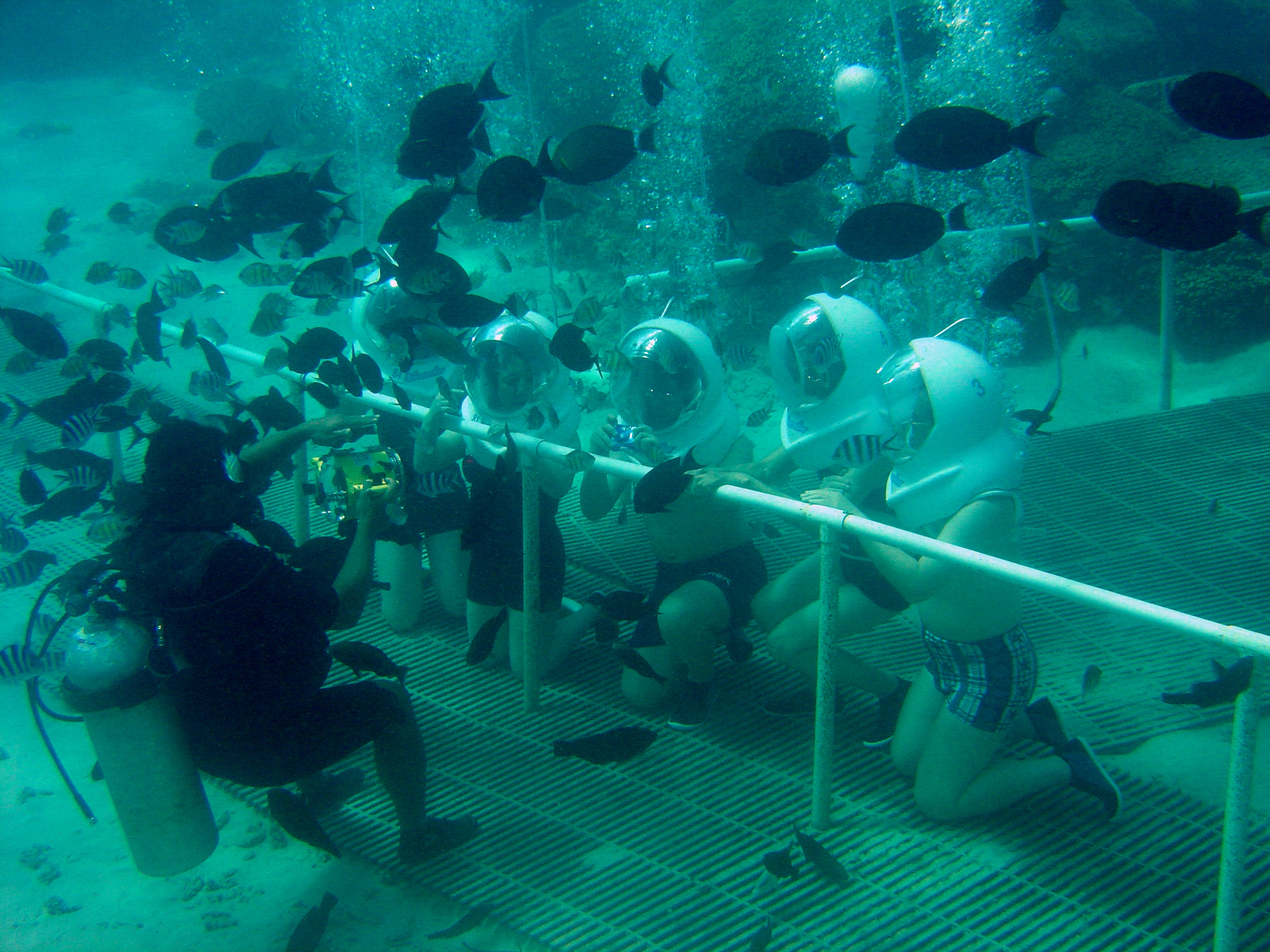
Tourists in Piti Bomb Holes Marine Preserve in Seawalker helmets with surface-supplied air posing for a photo

Scuba diving tourism is a subset of tourism that is dependent on a healthy marine ecosystem. In 2006, the Guam Economic Development Authority (GEDA) estimated that 30% of the island's economy was tourism, while 65% comprised the economic impact of the U.S. military. In 2001, a study by the Guam Visitors Bureau identified 13 dive companies operating on Guam, which employed 13 dive boats and 99 certified instructors. Authorities also believe there to be a large number of "fly-by-nighters" who operate out of vans and can handle small groups of tourists. According to the Professional Association of Diving Instructors (PADI), the largest diver certification agency, there were just over 10,000 PADI certifications issued on Guam in 2003, compared to about than 5,000 in 1990. The vast majority – 88% – of PADI certifications issued from 1980 to 2003 on Guam were to Japanese, with 9% to local divers and 3% to "other".

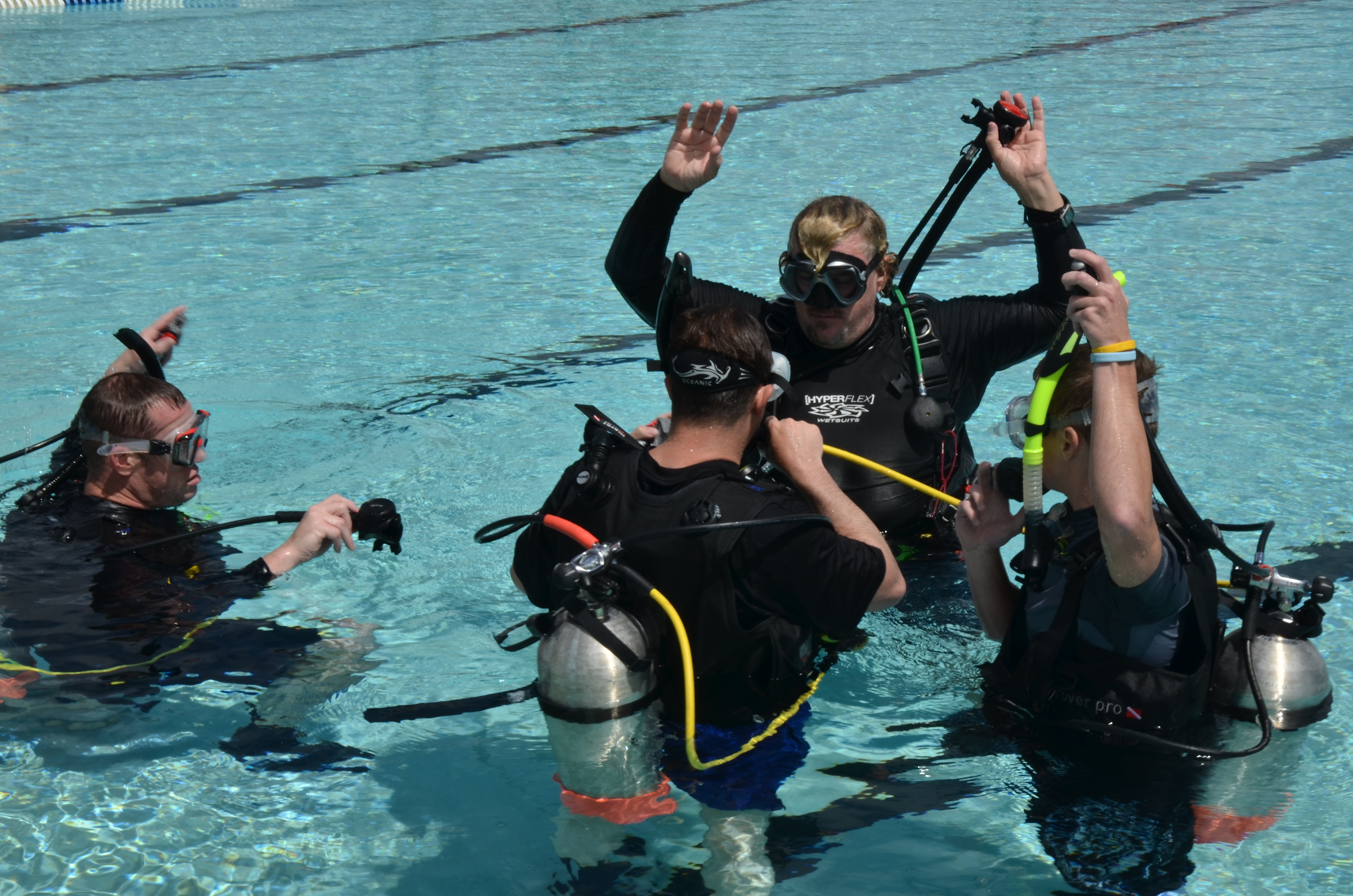
A recreational open-water scuba class on Andersen Air Force Base

In a 2007 study published by the University of Guam (UOG) Marine Lab, researchers attempted to estimate the number of dives and divers being conducted on Guam. The first method was to use 2002 numbers and tourist segment studies published by the Guam Visitors Bureau. Using this method, UOG study calculated that 6.3% of the 976,351 visitors in 2002 were divers, or 61,746 people. Since this study, number of Koreans tourists surged, eventually outnumbering Japanese tourists in 2017. Doing a similar calculation for fiscal year 2019, there were 734,339 arrivals from South Korea. Exit interviews by the Guam Visitors Bureau in FY2019 found that 27% of Korean visitors reported participation in scuba diving activities. This corresponds to about 198,271 Korean visitors diving at least once during the year. For the same time period, there were 674,345 arrivals from Japan, of whom 7% reported scuba diving, corresponding to about 74,204 divers. For context, the population of Guam in July 2021 is estimated at 168,801.

The 2007 UOG study estimated the annual number of dives by locals to be between 64,00 and 128,000. Combined with the visitors numbers for 2002, this yielded an estimated total number of annual dives on Guam of 190,000 to 375,000. This was comparable to the second method used by the researchers; using reported daily tank fill numbers, they alternately estimated that there were 256,00 to 340,000 dives annually. The study used 300,000 as its approximation of the number of dives per year on Guam, with one-third being made by locals and two-thirds by international visitors. After estimating the various costs of dives and certifications, the 2007 UOG study estimated that the direct economic value of visitor diving was $4 million, the most valuable water sport activity on Guam that is dependent on a healthy ecosystem. Diving by locals was valued at $1.2 million, third-place after dolphin watching.

PADI reports that there are 15 PADI dive shops on Guam, of which seven are 5 Star Instructor Development Centers/Resorts and four are PADI 5 Star Dive Centers/Resorts. The majority of PADI shops were located in central Guam, with the exceptions of dive shops catering to Naval Base Guam and Andersen Air Force Base.

Naval Base Guam has operated the U.S. Navy's busiest recompression chamber in the Pacific region since 1971. It is the only chamber, also called a dive locker, in the Micronesia region and treats both civilian and military divers suffering from decompression sickness. In 2016, the dive locker treated one person per week on average, down from three per week before the widespread use of dive computers. Most patients were tourists or local scuba spearfishermen.

=== Environmental impact of recreational diving ===
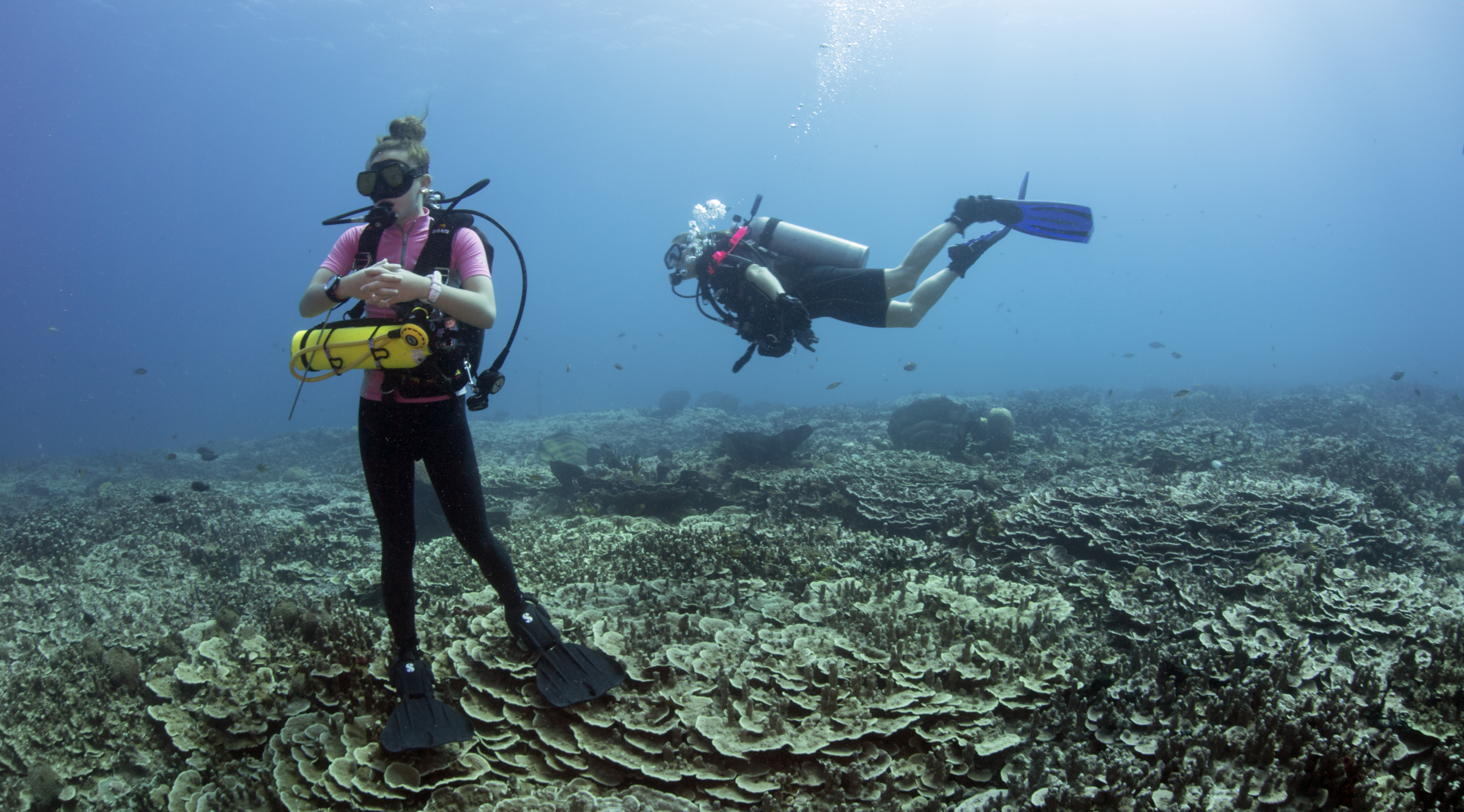
Diver with negative buoyancy standing on live coral structures

A number of recreational diving activities may have harmful environmental impacts, including touching or breaking coral, kicking sand or silt over living coral, and feeding or harassing wildlife. A small number of protected sites on Guam receive a disproportionately large percentage of inexperienced divers and students receiving open water instruction, who are the most likely to engage in harmful behaviors. These sites are Tumon Bay Marine Preserve, located in the tourist center of Tumon, and Piti Bomb Holes Marine Preserve, along the coast of Piti. The number of divers at Piti Bomb Holes increased dramatically after access to a third location, Outhouse Beach on Apra Harbor, was restricted in 2001. In the aftermath of the September 11, 2001 attacks, Outhouse Beach was deemed too close to critical infrastructure around the Port of Guam. An estimated 50 to 200 dives occurred daily within a 0.25 hectares (0.62 acres) section of Piti Bomb Holes Marine Preserve, putting the number of annual dives at over 18,000. The threshold at which coral damage can rapidly accumulate is 4,000 to 6,000 dives, putting Piti Bomb Holes at severe risk.

The International Coastal Cleanup is a popular event on Guam, which routinely ranks in the top 25 countries for pounds collected. The event typically includes cleanup scuba dives near the Agat World War II Amtrac site off Agat Cemetery and at Asan Cut, which are dive sites particularly prone to accumulating trash washed out by nearby rivers.

== Spearfishing ==
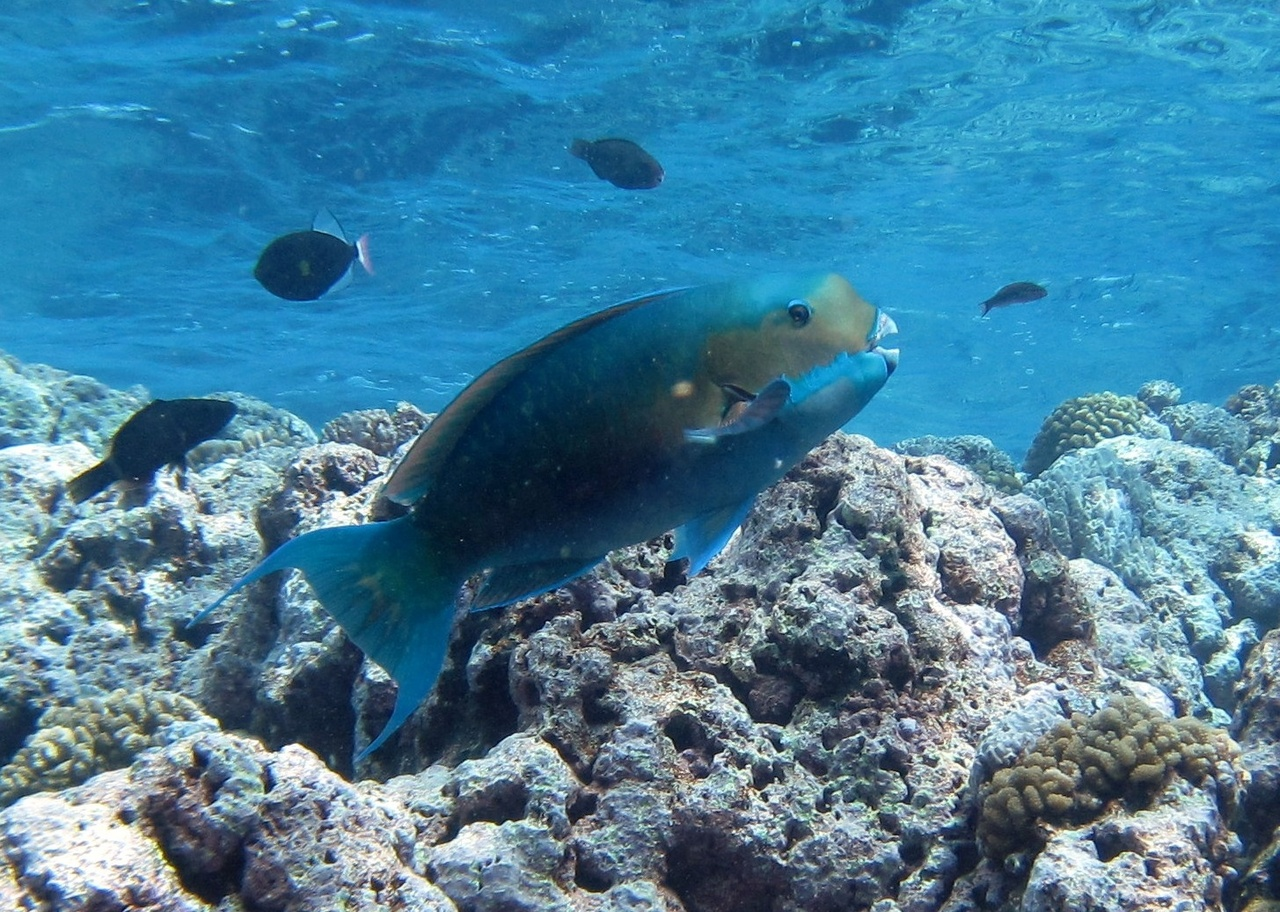
A steephead parrotfish in Tumon Bay. Parrotfish are highly desirable food fish on Guam

Breath-hold spearfishing is both a cultural and economic activity on Guam. The ancient CHamoru people used a barbed spear known as a fisga. The 8-foot wooden shaft was tipped with either wood or bone, and used for both surface and subsurface spearfishing. Spearfishing by skin divers was called etokcha' in the CHamoru language. Fishermen would swim with their eyes open and use an underhand thrust for small prey or an overhead thrust for larger prey. Irritated eyes were treated with drops from Scaevola taccada, known as nanasu.

Spearfishing continues to be widespread on Guam. Most spearfishing occurs from 5 to 60 feet (1.5 to 18.3 m), with the favored prey fish being parrotfish and unicornfish. Speared fish are often sold through the Guam Fisherman's Cooperative. A 2017 Western Pacific Regional Fishery Management Council meeting noted that the Marianas Underwater Fishing Federation was taking the lead in teaching spearfishermen to enter their catch in NOAA's Marine Recreational Information Program website/mobile app. The Federation noted, "they are trying hard to legitimize spearfishing as a sport, [but] there are many others who are pillaging the resources by spearing fish that are too small or taking more than what is needed." It was also noted that much of the catch recorded thus far was for personal use.

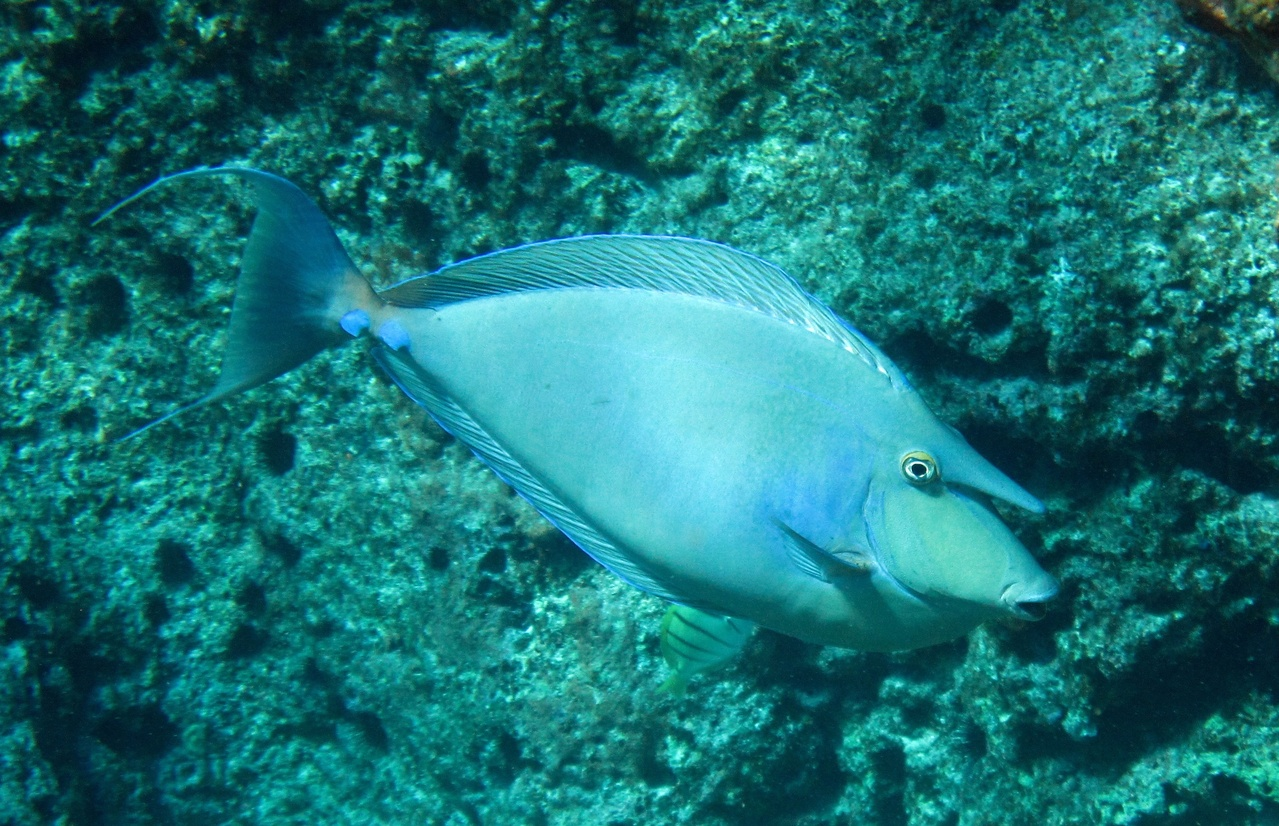
Bluespine unicornfish, known as tataga' in CHamoru, is a popular food fish on Guam

A 2010 study found that the establishment of Guam's marine preserves had more than doubled the death rate by drowning of CHamoru fisherman, including spear fishermen, with the hypothesis being that they were pushed into more hazardous areas. Prior to the establishment of the preserves in 1997, residents of Guam fished primarily on the western coast, which is leeward of the trade winds, and in the reefs along Cocos Lagoon in the south. Non-CHamoru fishermen who were resident on Guam were primarily recreational fishermen, while CHamoru residents were more likely subsistence fishermen. With the enforcement of marine preserves in the historical fishing grounds in the west and south, non-CHamoru recreational fishermen reduced their fishing activity, while CHamoru subsistence fishermen began more heavily fishing the windward eastern coast, which has more hazardous conditions that increase the risk of drowning. Comparing the pre-preserve period of 1986–2009 and post-period of 2001–2009, the study found that the drowning rate of CHamoru fishermen increased 225%; the proportion of drowning deaths on the east coast increased from 20% to 63%; and the drowning death rates of non-CHamoru fishermen fell by about 50%. Deaths of spearfishermen remain common.

=== Competitive spearfishing ===
Guam athletes participate in competitive spearfishing. Guam took gold in both the individual and team events at the quadrennial 2018 Micronesian Games, with one sports site commenting, "Guam has a very experienced and well-equipped crew that has a great deal of international spearfishing experience." Guam also took team gold and individual silver at the 2014 Games, as well as team gold and individual bronze at the 2010 Games.

In 2008, Guam made its first appearance at the Inter-Pacific Spearfishing Competition as a social competitor. It was voted in as a core member in 2014 and hosted for the first time in 2017. Guam placed third in the 2018 games. Guam representatives also competed at the inaugural Freshwater World Spearfishing Championships resulted in silver in individual men's in 2017. At the 2019 games, Guam won silver and bronze in mixed pairs. The Marianas Underwater Fishing Federation also sponsors an Annual Marianas Spearfishing Challenge in Hagåtña.

== Commercial, military, and scientific diving ==
Apra Harbor is the focus of much commercial diving, in particular for inspection, repair, and construction of wharves and mooring systems for the Port of Guam and Naval Base Guam.

Naval Base Guam has about 180 personnel who dive as part of their duties. This includes personnel from Naval Special Warfare Group One's Special Warfare Unit 1 of the Navy SEALs, elements from Marine Forces Special Operations Command, Explosive Ordnance Disposal Mobile Unit (EODMU) 5, and the submarine tenders USS Emory S. Land and USS Frank Cable. In August 1974, the hulk of RMS Caribia, a decommissioned passenger ship, ran aground at the tip of the Glass Breakwater and broke apart in Typhoon Mary. The ship salvage to clear the port entrance was complicated by the discovery of a Korean War-era LCU wreck next to Caribia with 50 tons of unexploded ordnance. This prompted the biggest EOD project ever conducted on Guam, requiring 952 dives over 388 hours.
