= Cabras Island =

Finger of land off the coast of Guam

Coordinates: 13.4620°N 144.6742°E

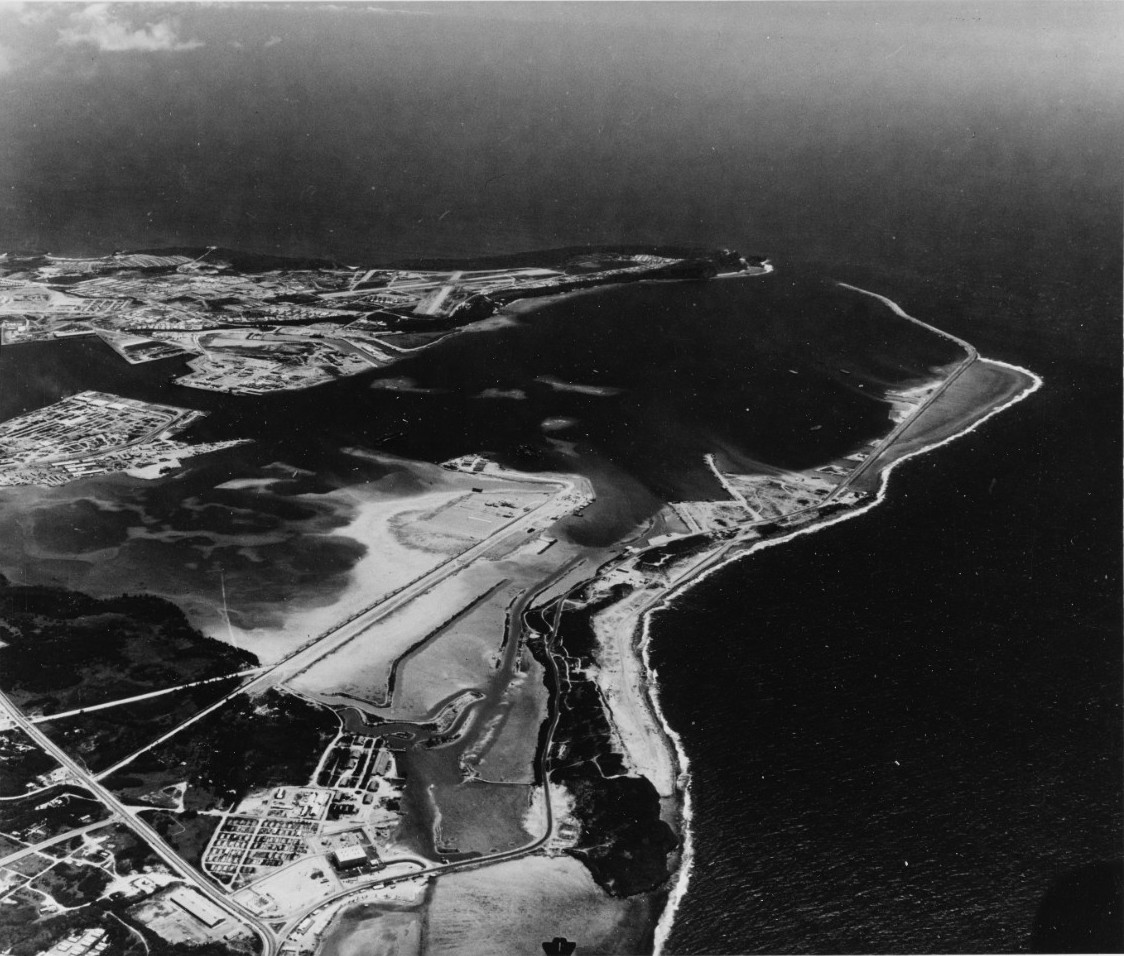
- Cabras Island and the Glass Breakwater form the northern boundary of Apra Harbor, 1950

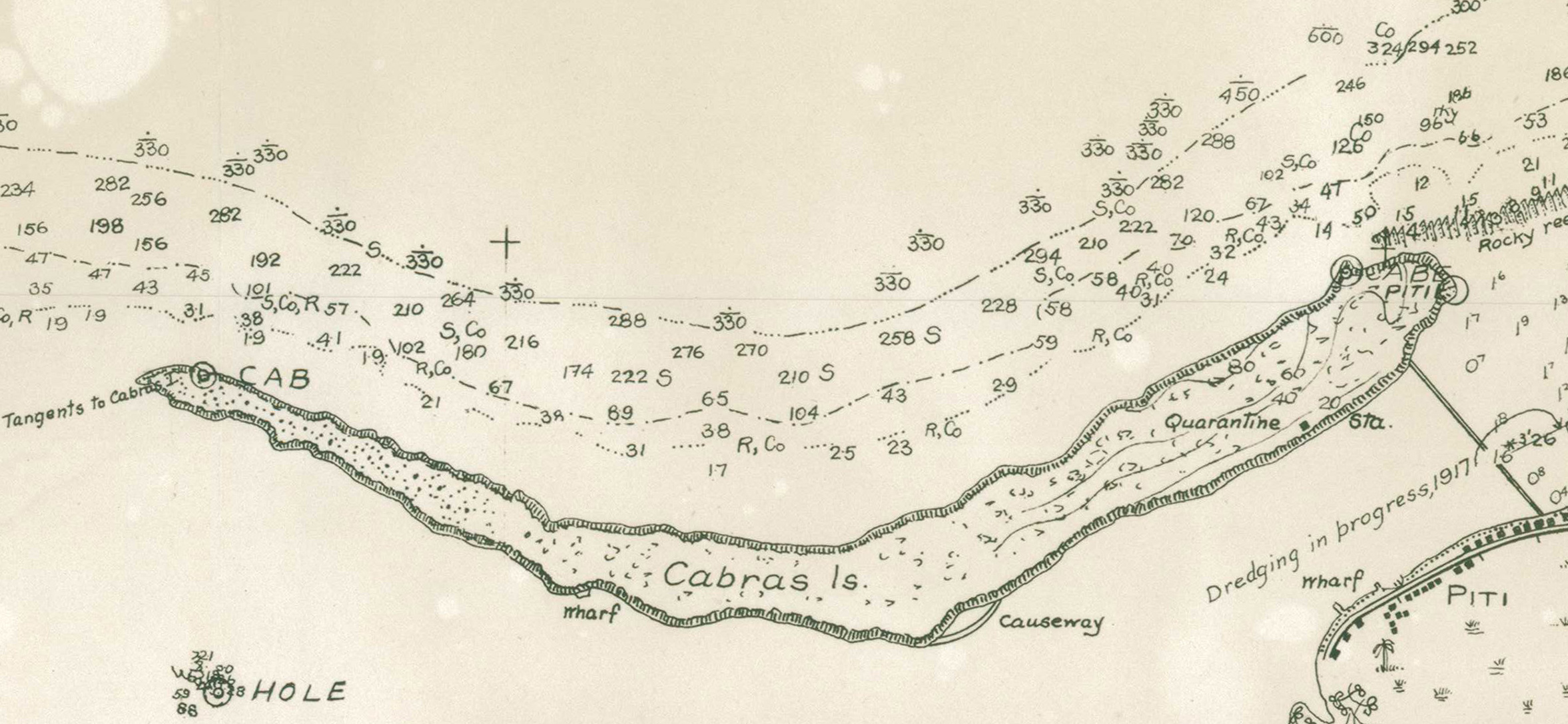
- Cabras Island in 1917, before being connected to the mainland at Piti

Geography
- Location: Pacific Ocean

Administration
- United States

Additional information
- Time zone: Chamorro Standard Time

Cabras Island was historically a low-lying finger of land off the coast of Piti, Guam that formed part of the northern protective arm of Apra Harbor. Shortly after the 1944 Battle of Guam it was connected by a causeway to the mainland and extended by the Glass Breakwater, and is now typically referred to simply as Cabras. Cabras houses both the Port of Guam and the primary Guam Power Authority generators supplying Guam. It lends its name to both a small vessel Cabras Marina, near the mainland, and the large vessel Cabras Channel, connecting the port to the deeper waters of the middle harbor.

== History ==
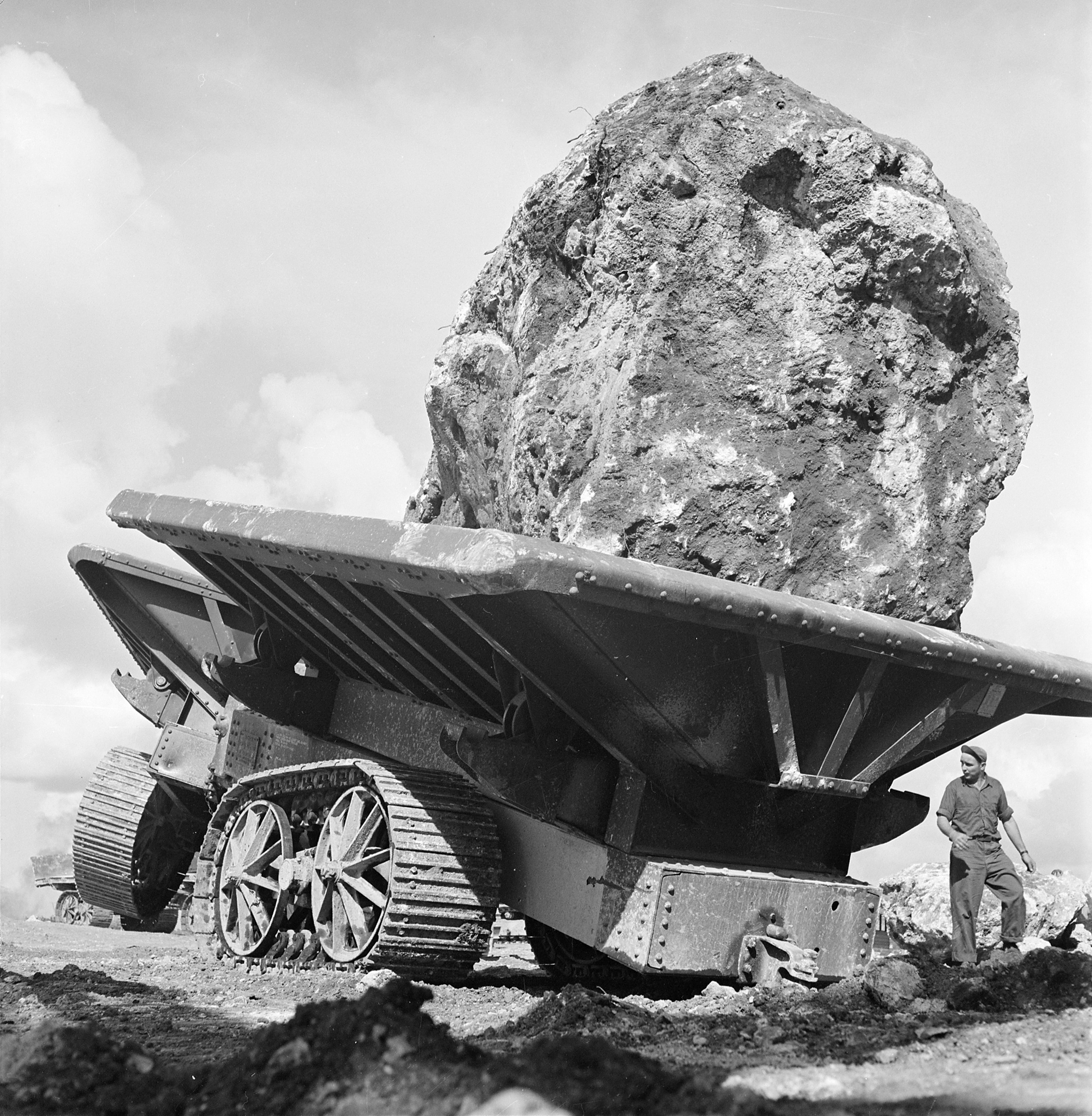
Boulder quarried from Cabras transported to build the final section of the Glass Breakwater, 1945

A corruption of the Chamorro name for Cabras, apapa, meaning "low", gives Apra Harbor its name. Before the twentieth century, Apra Harbor was protected by the Guam mainland to the east; Cabras Island, Luminao Reef, and Calalan Bank to the north; and Orote Peninsula to the south. After Spanish improvements to the harbor in the 1700s, Piti became the main port, with the only real road connecting Piti to the capital of Hagåtña to the north. The reef separating Cabras Island from the mainland was exposed at low tide and easily crossable by foot. The island was used for a quarantine camp.

Among the improvements recommended by a 1930s board headed by Rear Admiral Arthur Japy Hepburn in the run-up to World War II was a breakwater upon Luminao Reef to the west of Cabras Island. Construction began in August 1941. Limestone blocks quarried at Cabras Island were skidded along the reef to an improvised derrick. By the time of the Japanese invasion in December 1941, one mile of breakwater 36 feet wide and five feet above sea level had been constructed. The Glass Breakwater, named after the captain who captured Guam in 1898, was extended on Calalan Bank 3,260 feet (990 m) to a width of 32 feet (9.8 m). The northern arm of Apra Harbor, from the main island through Cabras to the tip of the breakwater at Spanish Rocks measured 17,000 feet (5,200 m). After the U.S. recaptured Guam, five 366-foot concrete-hulled barges were added to the breakwater by scuttling in August and September 1944.

In 1964, the Commander Naval Forces Marianas proposed that the commercial port be moved out of Inner Apra Harbor on Naval Base Guam to a new location on Cabras. Much of the funding for the Port of Guam facility came through the Guam Rehabilitation Act of 1963, passed by Congress to rebuild the island after the devastation of Typhoon Karen. The new port was completed in June 1969.

The breakwater road is sometimes closed for security reasons during visits by ships. The island is also used for snorkeling and watersports.
