= Apra Harbor =

Seaport in Guam

Coordinates: 13°27′12″N 144°39′12.56″E

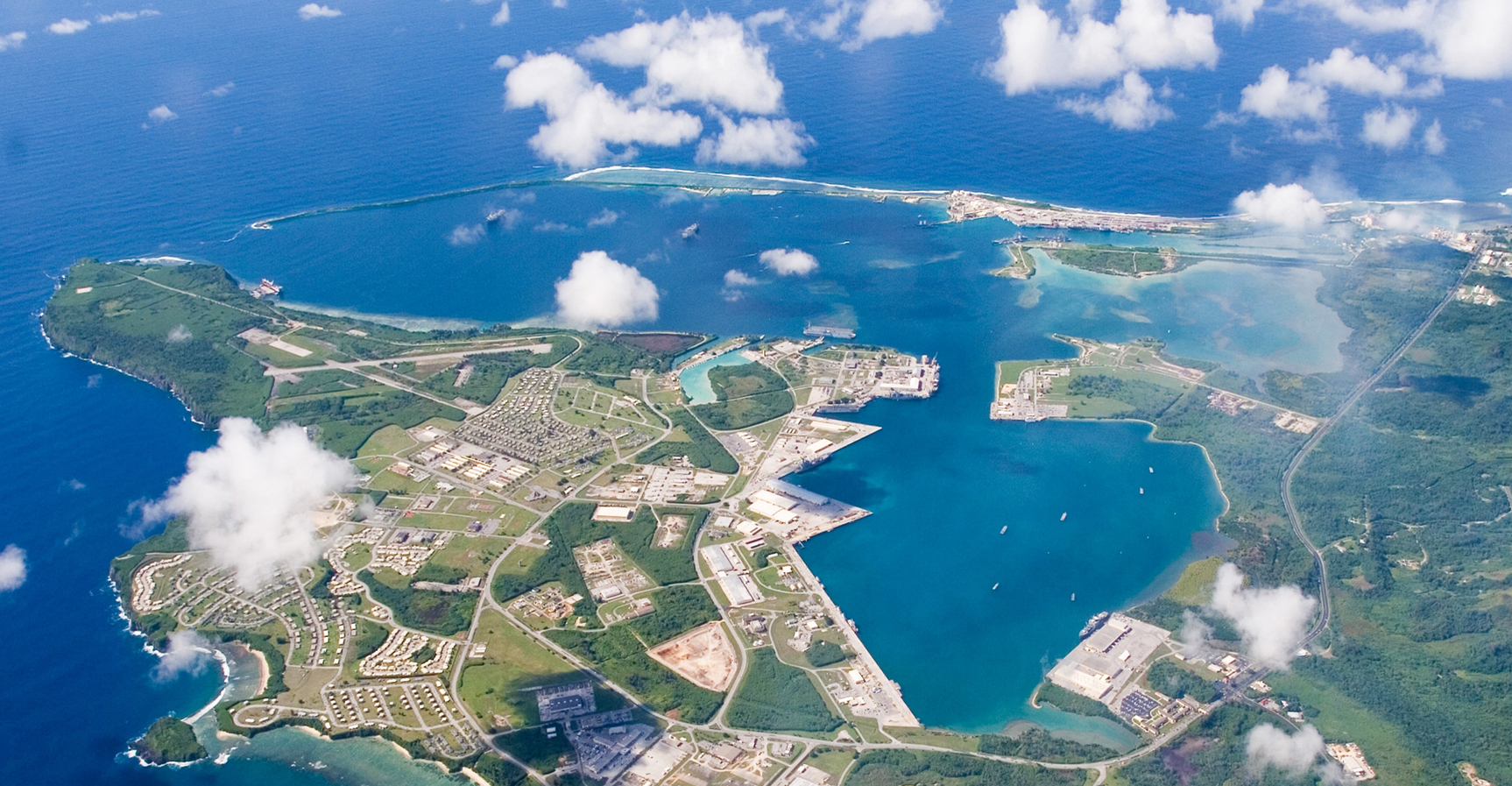
Apra Harbor from the south, with Naval Base Guam on the Orote Peninsula in the foreground

Apra Harbor, also called Port Apra, is a deep-water port on the western side of the United States territory of Guam. It is considered one of the best natural ports in the Pacific Ocean. The harbor is bounded by Cabras Island and the Glass Breakwater to the north and the Orote Peninsula in the south. Naval Base Guam and the Port of Guam are the two major users of the harbor. It is also a popular recreation area for boaters, surfers, scuba divers, and other recreationalists.

== Geography ==
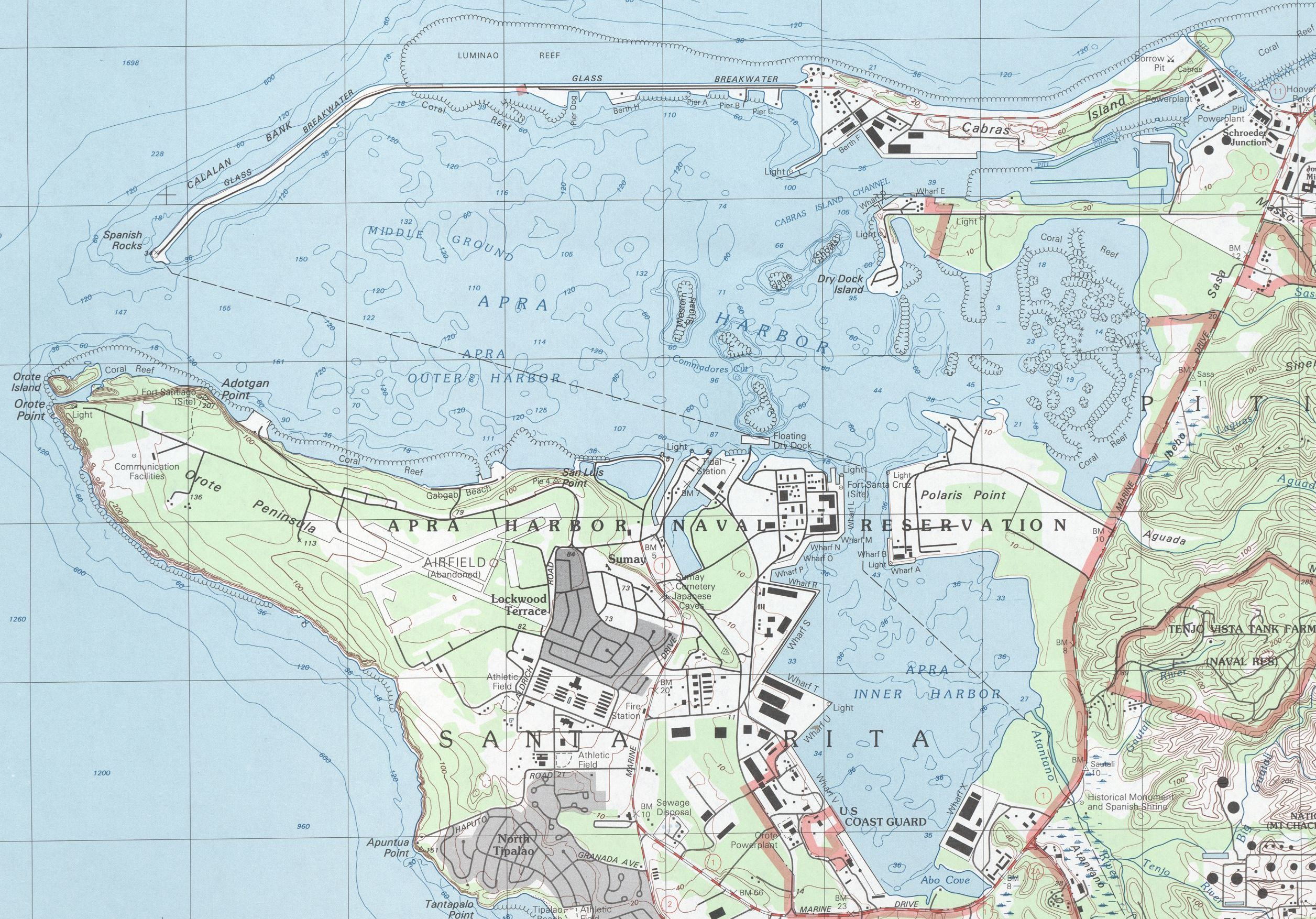
USGS map of Apra Harbor, 2000

The geography of Apra Harbor has been extensively modified from its pre-historical state by humans. The entrance to the harbor is flanked by Point Udall, formerly Orote Point, to the south and Spanish Rocks at the tip of the Glass Breakwater. The Glass Breakwater, built on top of Calalan Bank and the fringing Luminao Reef, connects to Cabras Island, the location of the Port of Guam, which handles more than 90% of civilian cargo imported to Guam. Inland areas in the villages of Piti and Santa Rita form the eastern boundary of the harbor. There are two small artificial peninsulas jutting into the eastern end of the harbor. The northernmost is named Drydock Island, the tip of which is a military reservation with wharves for fueling ships. South of Drydock Island is Sasa Bay, one of five marine preserves created by the Government of Guam. The southern boundary of Sasa Bay is formed by Polaris Point, a geographically separate part of Naval Base Guam that is the homeport of Submarine Squadron 15. Polaris Point and the Orote Peninsula form the entrance to Inner Apra Harbor, a military restricted area. The Orote Peninsula holds the main part of Naval Base Guam and is approximately four miles to its tip at Point Udall. There are two named large coral formations roughly west of Sasa Bay in Outer Apra Harbor: Western Shoals and Jade Shoals.

Ten rivers flow into Apra Harbor: Atantano River, Sasa River, Aguada River, Big Guatali River, Aplacho River, Maggo River, Guatali River, Laghas River, Tenjo River and Paulana River.

=== Census designated place ===
"Apra Harbor" is also a census-designated place (CDP) in Guam that comprises Naval Base Guam and housing extending into the hills of Santa Rita village. In 2010, the population of the Apra Harbor CDP was 2,471.

== History ==
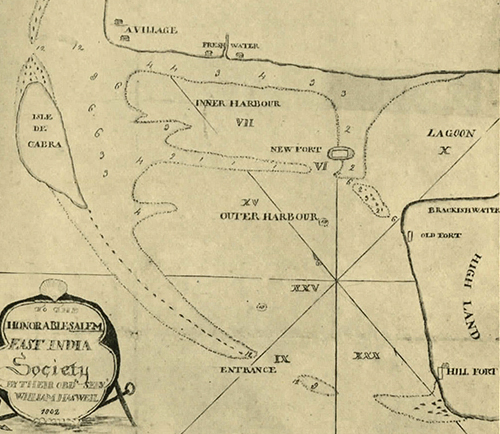
1802 map. Piti village and the three Spanish batteries are marked. The area marked as "Lagoon" corresponds to current day Inner Apra Harbor. The anchorage marked as "Inner Harbour" is now bisected by the artificial peninsula Drydock Island.

Apra comes from the Chamorro word "apapa", meaning "low." Apapa is the original name of Cabras Island. The harbor offered rich fishing grounds and was home to many Chamorro villages.

During Spanish rule, the name of Saint Louis IX was added and the harbor was referred to as the port of San Luis de Apra. However, it was not a favored anchorage during the Spanish–Chamorro Wars of the late seventeenth century and resulting the early Spanish period, mainly because of the many reefs and coral heads. The Spanish preferred ports were Umatac and Hagåtña, resulting in Apra Harbor being used by foreigners seeking to avoid Spanish authority. The English pirate John Eaton is reported to have anchored at Apra Harbor in 1685 to trade provisions with Chamorros.

In the early 18th century, Spain's Council of the Indies grew increasingly concerned about competing navies threatening the Manila galleon trade and Spain's possessions in the Pacific. This was aggravated by an attack in 1721 by the English privateer John Clipperton upon a supply ship from Cavite anchored at Merizo. In 1734, Governor Francisco de Cárdenas Pacheco opened up new anchorages in Apra Harbor, and built three cannon batteries or forts to protect them. Fort San Luis was built in 1737 near Gab Gab and Fort Santiago was built at Orote Point to guard the entrance to the harbor. The third fort, Fort Santa Cruz, was built around 1800 atop a reef near the entrance to the harbor.

William Haswell, an officer on the first documented American visit to Guam in January 1802, wrote a description of Apra Harbor:

On the S.W. side of the Island is a very fine Bay and Harbour, defended on the West and N.W. sides by a Reef and a small Island and perfectly saft Anchorage. It consists of three places, Viz, a large outer Harbour where 300 Ships may Ride in Safety, an inner harbour that will hold many sail if required moor'd head and stern, and a large Lagoon to the Eastward which nothing but Boats can enter as the water is so Shallow on the Bar, but over it is a very deep water and it goes a long way into the Island, at the End of which is a large Village with a Church, &c. This Bay has two forts, one on an Island in the middle of the Harbour of Six guns and it commands the Enterance of the Inner harbour; the other Fort of four guns is on the high hill on the Starboard side of the bay agoing up it.

Apra Harbor was thus used more frequently in the nineteenth century. Piti became the primary port, used to connect to the capital in Hagåtña. Meanwhile, Sumay became a popular port of whalers, in particular during the height of Pacific whaling in the early 1800s. In the 1840s, up to 60 whaling ships stopped in Apra Harbor every year, turning Sumay into the commercial and financial center of the island. The decline of whaling by the end of the nineteenth century also resulted in the economic decline of the port, and lack of maintenance to the harbor defenses. Even in 1817, Otto von Kotzebue reported that Fort San Luis was no longer in use. The three cannon at Fort Santiago were reported unusable in 1853 and, in 1884, Governor Francisco Olive y Garcia declared that Fort Santiago was useful only as an observation post. By the time of the 1898 Spanish–American War none of the three fortifications was in operation.

=== American capture ===
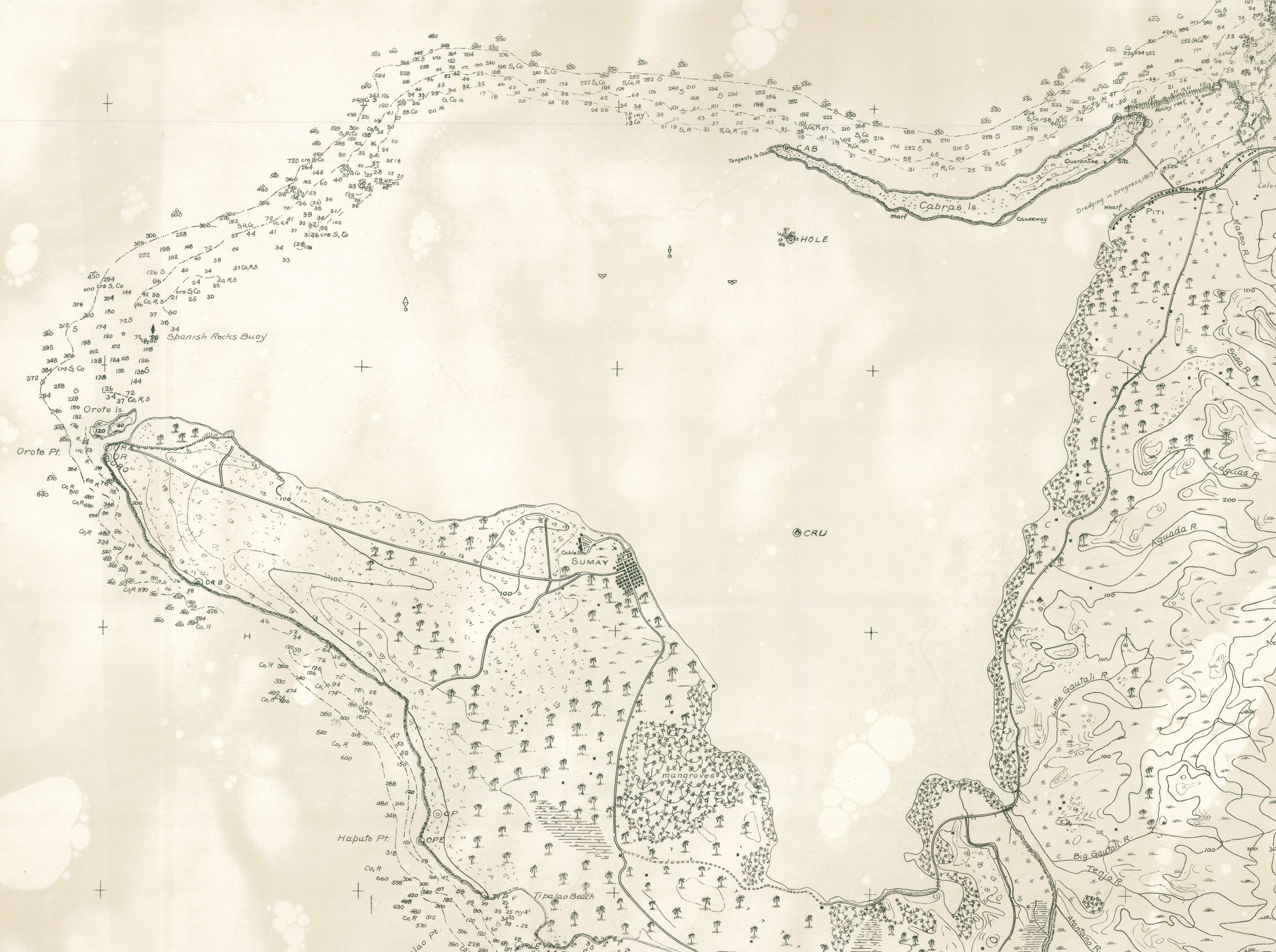
1912 map. Piti and Sumay lie directly on the harbor, with a quarantine station on Cabras Island. The Glass Breakwater, Drydock Island, and Polaris Point have not yet been built.

American captain Henry Glass had received intelligence that Spanish men-of-war were anchored at Guam and that the harbor itself had formidable defenses. However, when Glass arrived in Apra Harbor on June 20, 1898 to claim the island on behalf of the United States, he encountered no resistance. A Marine Barracks Guam was established on Sumay in 1901, and a small navy yard at Piti. Apra Harbor was used as a coaling station, refueling ships transiting across the Pacific. The new American Naval government also began to develop the harbor, though launch boats were still required to navigate the coral reefs to land at Piti and Sumay. In 1903, the Commercial Pacific Cable Company laid submarine communications cable for telegraph through a station at Sumay, linking the United States to Asia, and each to Guam, for the first time.

On April 7, 1917, the scuttling by her crew of SMS Cormoran, a German merchant raider that had been held in Apra Harbor for two years, was the first violent action of the United States in World War I, first shots fired by the U.S. against Germany in WWI, the first German prisoners of war captured by the U.S., and the first Germans killed in action by the U.S. in WWI

In 1922, dredged materials from the harbor were used to fill the coastline at Sumay and a seawall was constructed, among the first large scale man-made changes to the shoreline. On March 17, 1921, U.S. suspicions of Japanese intentions for its South Seas Mandate led it to create a U.S. Marine Squadron floatplane base at Sumay. Guam's first golf course, Sumay Golf Links, was established in the village in 1923. The U.S. eventually decided to close the seaplane base at Sumay on February 23, 1931. In 1935, Pan American Airways established rights to use the former Marine Aviation facility and made Sumay a base for its China Clipper. the first trans-Pacific air cargo service, flying from San Francisco to Manila, arrived at Sumay on November 27, 1935 and the first passenger service flight on October 21, 1936.

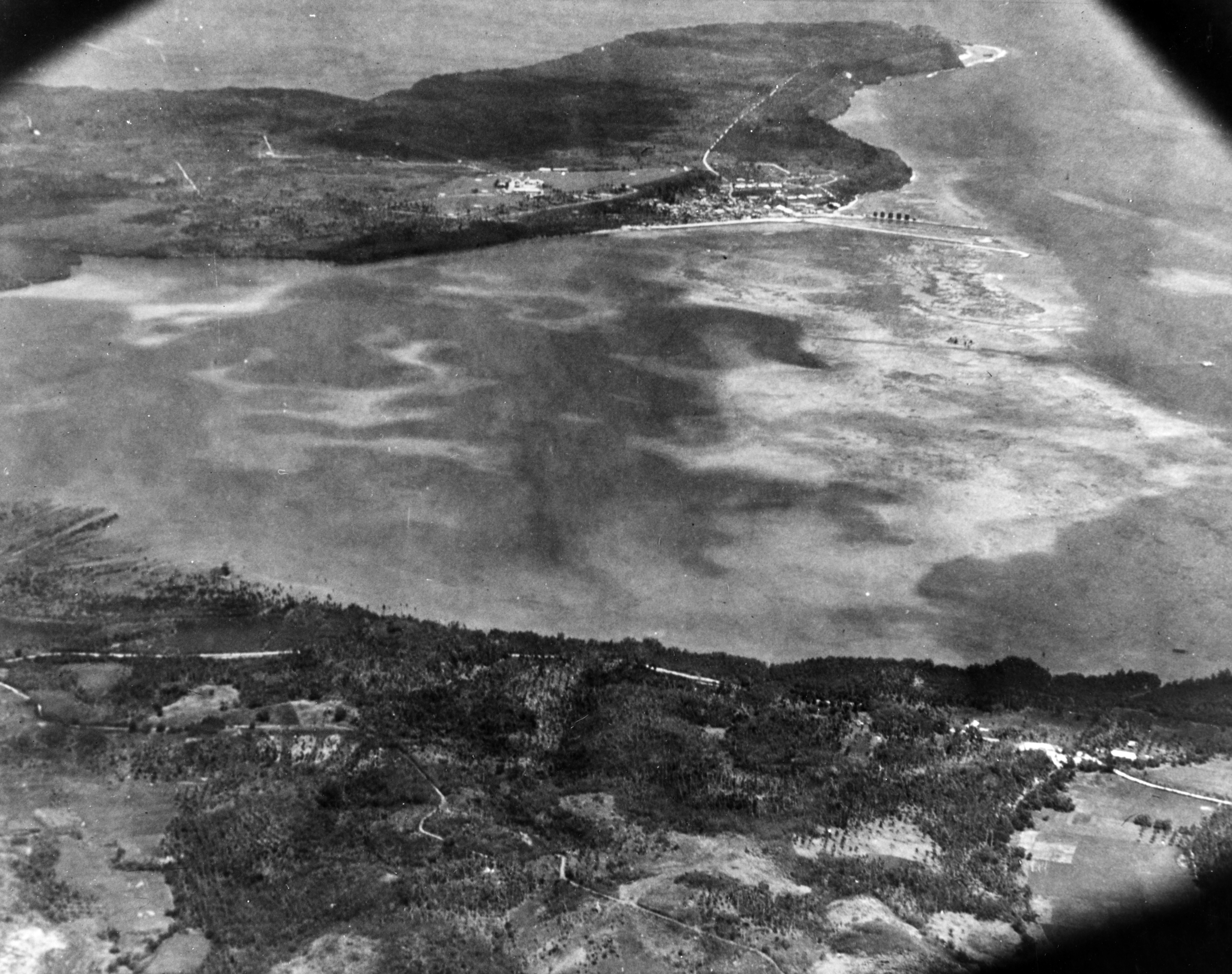
Southern Apra Harbor in 1941, showing the Pan American Airways fuel piers at Sumay, as well as the lagoon that would be constructed into Inner Apra Harbor after the WWII

In the 1930s, the Empire of Japan traded with Guam specifically with the view to increasing its knowledge of the island. With tensions rising after the 1931 Japanese invasion of Manchuria starting the Second Sino-Japanese War, Rear Admiral Arthur Japy Hepburn was appointed on June 7, 1938 to chair a board to provide recommendations on the American response. The resulting Hepburn Board Report recommended a massive buildup of U.S. Navy facilities. The Report recommended fortifying Guam as an air and submarine base, with many improvements to Apra Harbor, but the Navy balked at the estimated cost, eventually designated $5 million for Apra Harbor improvements. A strong typhoon struck Guam on November 3, 1940, causing widespread damage. In Apra Harbor, the storm damaged the Navy Yard at Piti and the Marine barracks and Pan American Airways facilities at Sumay. The U.S. Navy's YM-13, which had been dredging a channel near Sumay, was blown ashore and a yard patrol boat sunk.

Among the Hepburn Board Report improvements that was funded was the construction of a breakwater upon Luminao Reef, which began in August 1941. Limestone blocks quarried at Cabras Island were skidded along the reef to an improvised derrick. By the time of the Japanese invasion, one mile of breakwater, 36 feet wide five-feet above sea level had been constructed. A 1946 Navy report notes, "practically all the [Hepburn] board's recommendations, except those relating to Guam, were carried out and contributed materially to our position when war actually developed." During the 1941 Japanese invasion, Guam was practically defenseless.

=== World War II ===
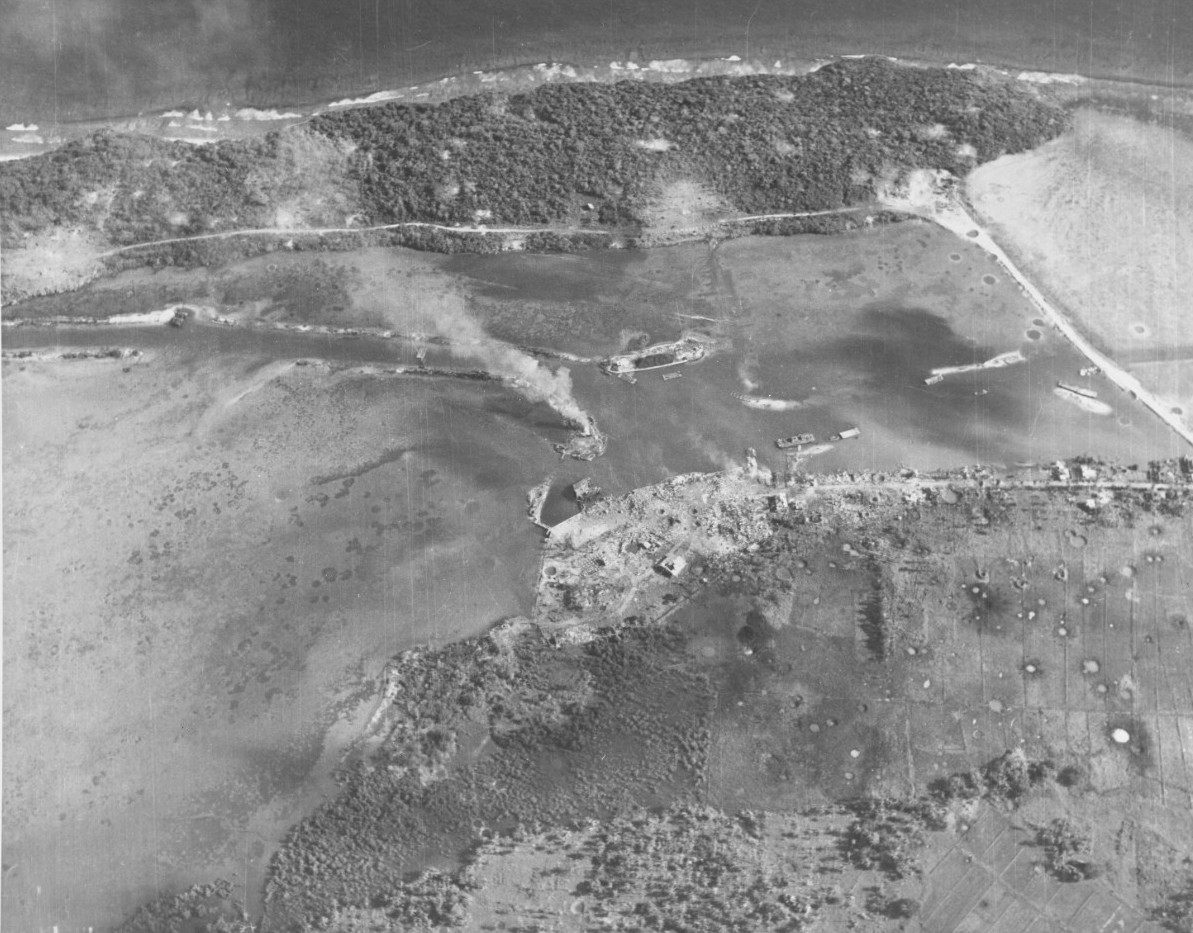
The bombarded former Piti Navy Yard and causeway to Cabras Island on July 20, 1944, two days before the U.S. landings.

During the Japanese occupation of Guam, the residents of Sumay were evicted and the town converted into a Japanese garrison. The harbor itself was extensively used by Japanese vessels, including for repair and refueling of their submarines and warships. Orote Peninsula was the center of Japanese resistance during the U.S. liberation of Guam in 1944 and the area around the harbor saw intense fighting. Both Piti and Sumay were leveled by the pre-invasion bombardment and very few harbor improvements survived.

Clearance, salvage and harbor construction began before the island was fully secure by advance elements of the 301st Naval Construction Battalion ("Seabees") (NCB 301), tasked with salvage, clearing and developing ports even as fighting prolonged ashore, arriving in William Ward Burrows in the first days of August. Full scale development began with arrival of the NCB 301 headquarters and barracks ship City of Dalhart on 11 August 1944.

Constructing harbor facilities was the highest priority and the Seabees began installing pontoon piers. Construction at the first pier, at an old Navy fueling site on Cabras Island, required blasting to get to a 35 feet (11 m) depth. This first pier was constructed between August 5 and 22, 1944. By October 1, six piers were operational and a seventh was being built, when a typhoon destroyed or severely damaged all the pontoon piers. At the same time as piers were being constructed, two other massive projects were occurring. The Glass Breakwater, named after the captain who captured Guam in 1898, was extended on Calalan Bank 3,260 feet (990 m) to a width of 32 feet (9.8 m). The northern arm of Apra Harbor, from the main island through Cabras to the tip of the breakwater at Spanish Rocks measured 17,000 feet (5,200 m).

Construction of Inner Apra Harbor required 7,500,000 cubic feet (210,000 m^{3}) of dredging and 26,000 feet (7,900 m) of quay wall. A small boat pool and a submarine base with a finger pier was established in the Inner harbor. Small boat repair facilities at Piti were repaired and improved. Navy News noted that over 7,000 tons of explosives had been used in 1944 to clear ship passages in Guam. 50 pounds (23 kg) of these explosives is enough to destroy a volume of coral 100 by 3 feet (30.48 m × 0.91 m) deep. By July 1945, two months before the end of the Pacific War, there were 14 quay-wall berths, nine pontoon piers, two wooden fueling piers, ten Landing Ship, Tank (LST) berths, and one submarine pier.

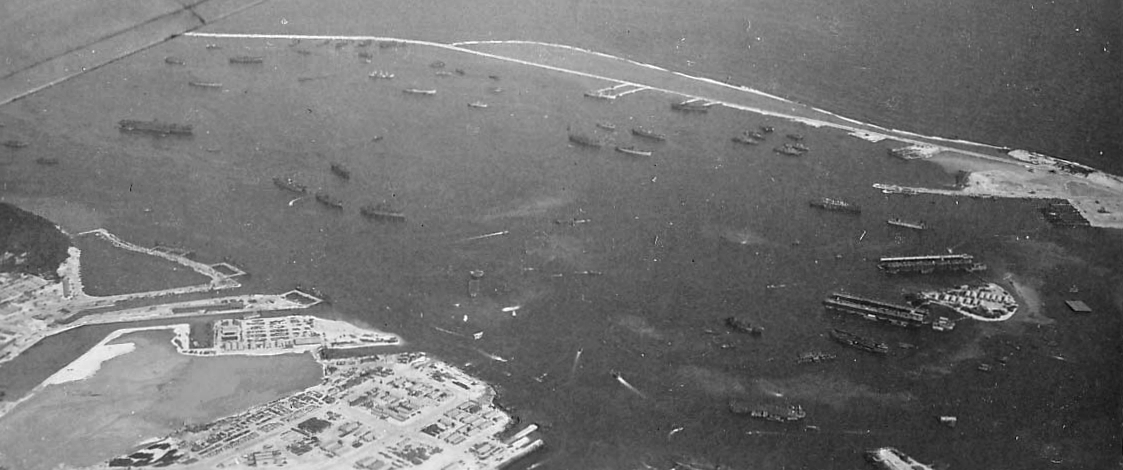
The harbor in 1945

The residents of Sumay were not allowed to return and rebuild their homes, and the U.S. military relocated them to a refugee camp in the nearby inland hills in 1946. Unbeknownst to them, Admiral Chester Nimitz had requested 55% of Guam be set aside for military use, including all of Sumay. In 1946, the U.S. Congress passed Public Law 594, The Guam Acquisition of Lands Act, allowing the U.S. Navy to acquire any and all lands it deemed necessary on the island. In 1948, the military filed Civil Case No. 5-49 in the Superior Court of Guam, declaring a taking of Sumay, as well as parts of Piti and Agat, totaling 2,471 acres, with little or no compensation. The refugees from Sumay created the village of Santa Rita, the municipality in which the Orote Peninsula is now located. The population center of Piti was relocated away from its old shoreline along Apra Harbor.

The territorial Naval Administration ran the commercial port until 1951, when the 24 acres of commercial port in Piti was transferred to the United States Department of Commerce. In 1962, the Interior Department transferred the commercial port to the Government of Guam. Over 1,000 acres was eventually transferred from the federal government to the Government of Guam for port use. The port built the ability to handle containerized cargo in 1969. In 1969, a yacht club was founded and began using the harbor for recreational small boating. During the 1960s and 1970s, the port's strategic importance was highlighted by its utility during the Vietnam War.

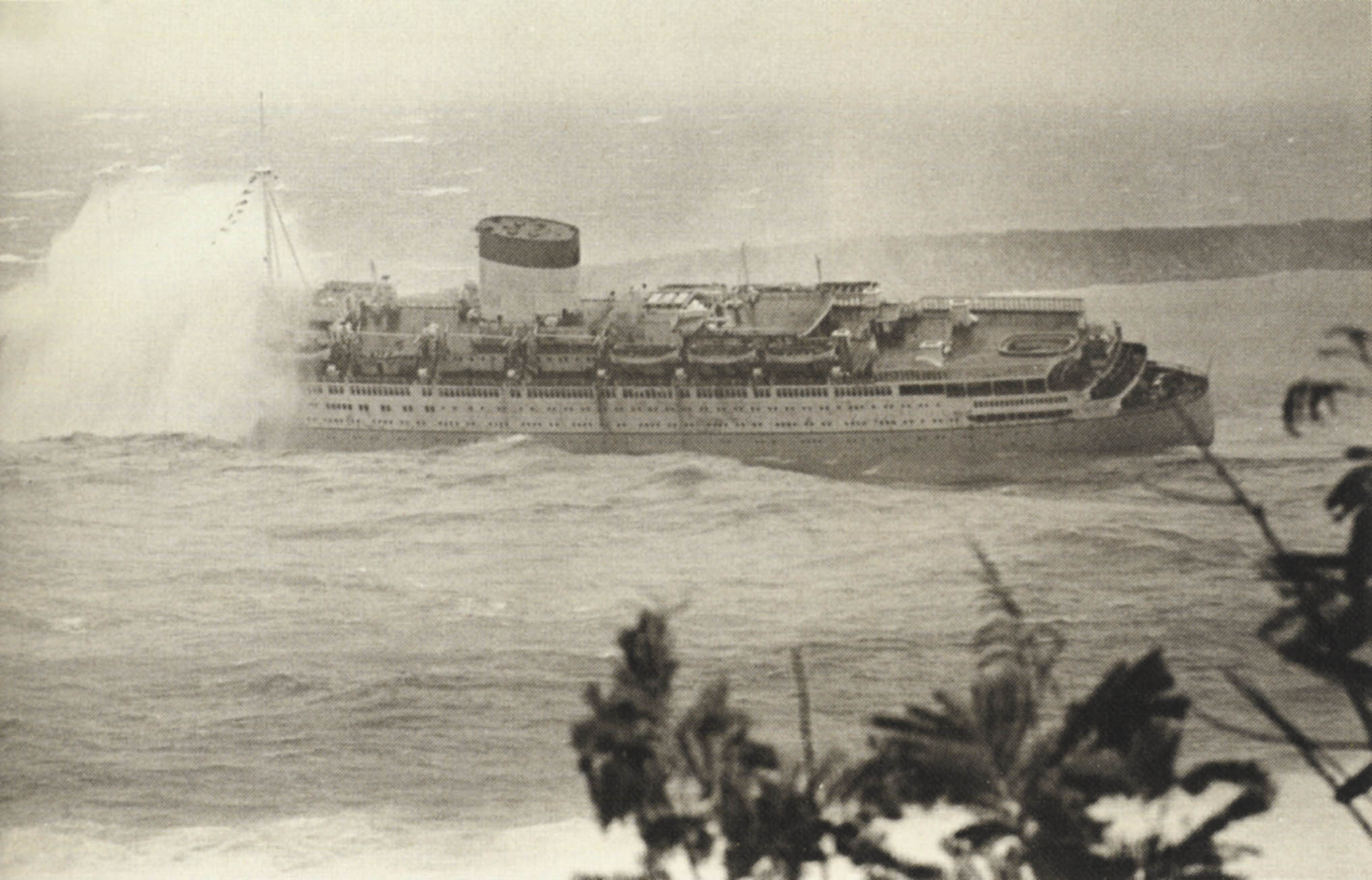
RMS Caribia crashing into the Glass Breakwater, 1974

On August 12, 1974, the tugboat towing RMS Caribia, a decommissioned passenger ship, to Taiwan sailed into the tropical storm that later became Typhoon Mary and attempted to reach safety at Apra Harbor. In danger of being pulled onto the reef, the tug captain cut the tow line just 800 yards (730 m) from Spanish Rocks. Adrift, Caribia crashed against the tip of Glass Breakwater with her stern blocking a third of the harbor entrance. She broke into three pieces and rough weather prevented the Navy and Coast Guard from determining if her stern section piece still blocked the entrance, closing the port. Side-scan sonar was eventually used to determine that the harbor entrance could be used. The Army Corps of Engineers conducted its largest ever ship salvage, which was complicated by the discovery of a Korean War-era LCU wreck next to Caribia with 50 tons of unexploded ordnance, prompting the biggest project ever conducted by the Explosive Ordnance Division on Guam.

In 1997, Guam designated Sasa Bay, which is located in the east of the harbor as a marine preserve in order to protect declining fish populations.

=== Military realignment ===
In 2006 the U.S. Japan "Roadmap for Realignment Implementation Agreement" agreed that over 8,600 U.S. Marines currently based in Okinawa, Japan would relocate to the U.S. territory of Guam and the Marianas Islands. This reorientation could be one of the largest peacetime military relocations in U.S. history. The details of the military move are evolving, and much is on hold due to budget sequestration. The U.S. Navy has suggested the need for expansion of Apra Harbor, which is the largest deep water port in the Western Pacific and the busiest in Micronesia to allow the basing of additional ships in Guam as part of the Navy's shift to the Pacific.

== Activities ==
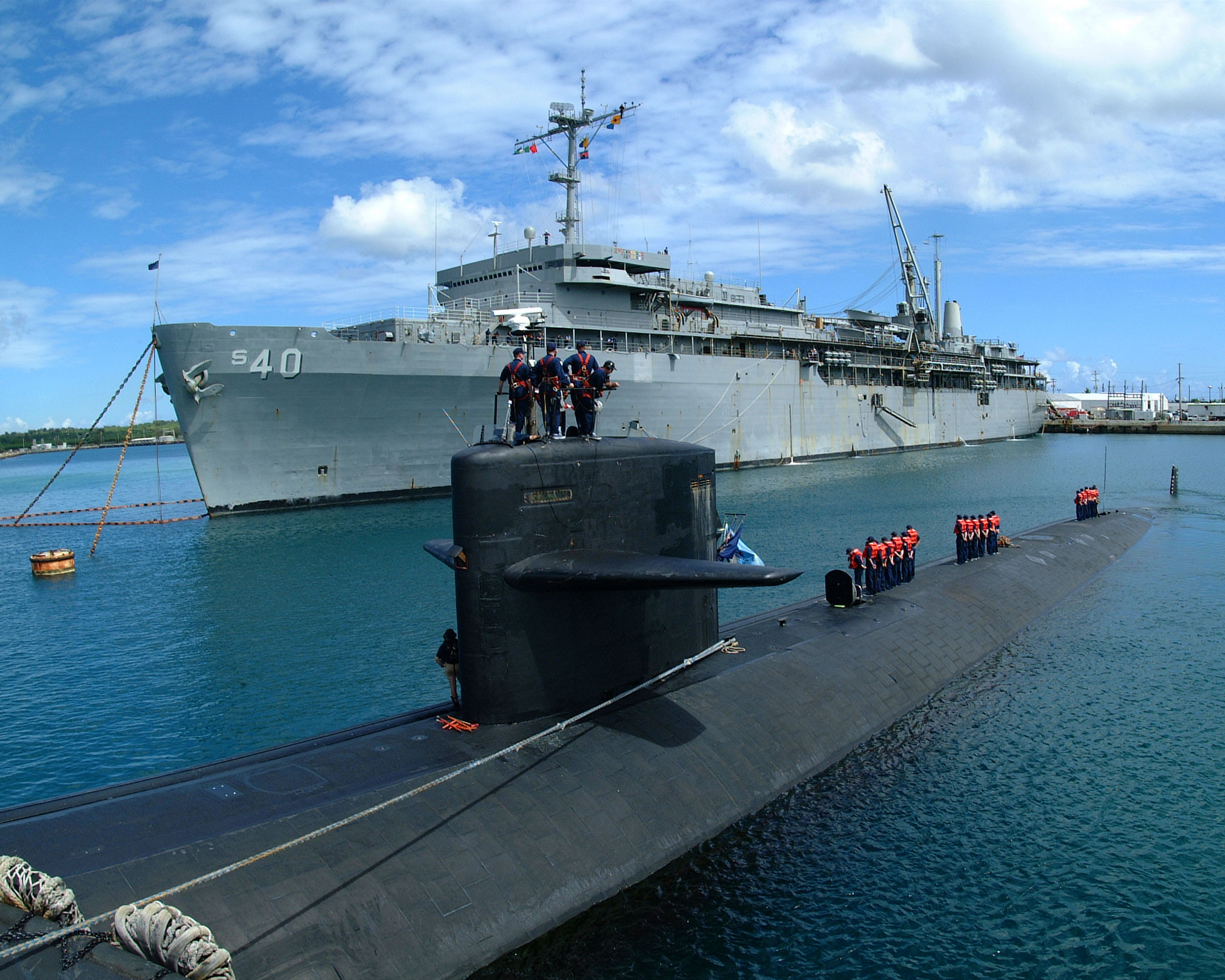
Attack submarine USS Salt Lake City and tender USS Frank Cable in Inner Apra Harbor, 2002

Apra Harbor currently has many users, the two major ones being Naval Base Guam and the Port of Guam. Since 2009, facilities on Naval Base Guam are supported by Joint Region Marianas. The largest tenant unit at Naval Base Guam is Submarine Squadron 15, which is supported by ship tender USS Frank Cable. Coast Guard Station Apra Harbor is also located on Naval Base Guam property and has an area of responsibility including the Mariana Islands, Palau and the Federated States of Micronesia; it has three Sentinel-class cutters: Frederick Hatch, Myrtle Hazard, and Oliver Henry; and the Seagoing Buoy Tender USCGC Sequoia. Kilo Wharf, located on the Orote Peninsula near the mouth of the harbor, is the only U.S. deep water ammunition port in the Western Pacific and also allows emergency berthing by visiting aircraft carriers, such as during the 2020 COVID-19 outbreak aboard USS Theodore Roosevelt.

The Port of Guam handles over ninety percent of total imports to Guam. In FY2008, more than 2 million cargo revenue tons in 99,908 containers were handled, including for transshipment to nearby Western Pacific islands. Five cruise ships visit Guam annually, requiring a reconfiguring of port operations.

Marinas are located in the area known as Inner Cabras in Piti between Cabras and Drydock Island, just south of the Guam Power Authority plants. Aquaworld Marina and Harbor of Refuge are owned and operated by the Port, with slips leased to tenants. The area, collectively known as Cabras Marina, berths personal small watercraft, diving boats, tourist sightseeing boats, and an Atlantis Submarine, which visits a coral reef off Gab Gab on the Orote Peninsula. The Marianas Yacht Club, located on the south shore of Drydock Island on Sasa Bay, provides mooring buoys for transPacific cruising yachts

In addition to shore berths, a total of 21 mooring buoys are located in the harbor. However, none is suitable for large vessel mooring during a typhoon, requiring craft to put out to sea for safety in extreme weather. One buoy is reserved for a Military Sealift Command strategic sealift ship.

=== Recreation ===
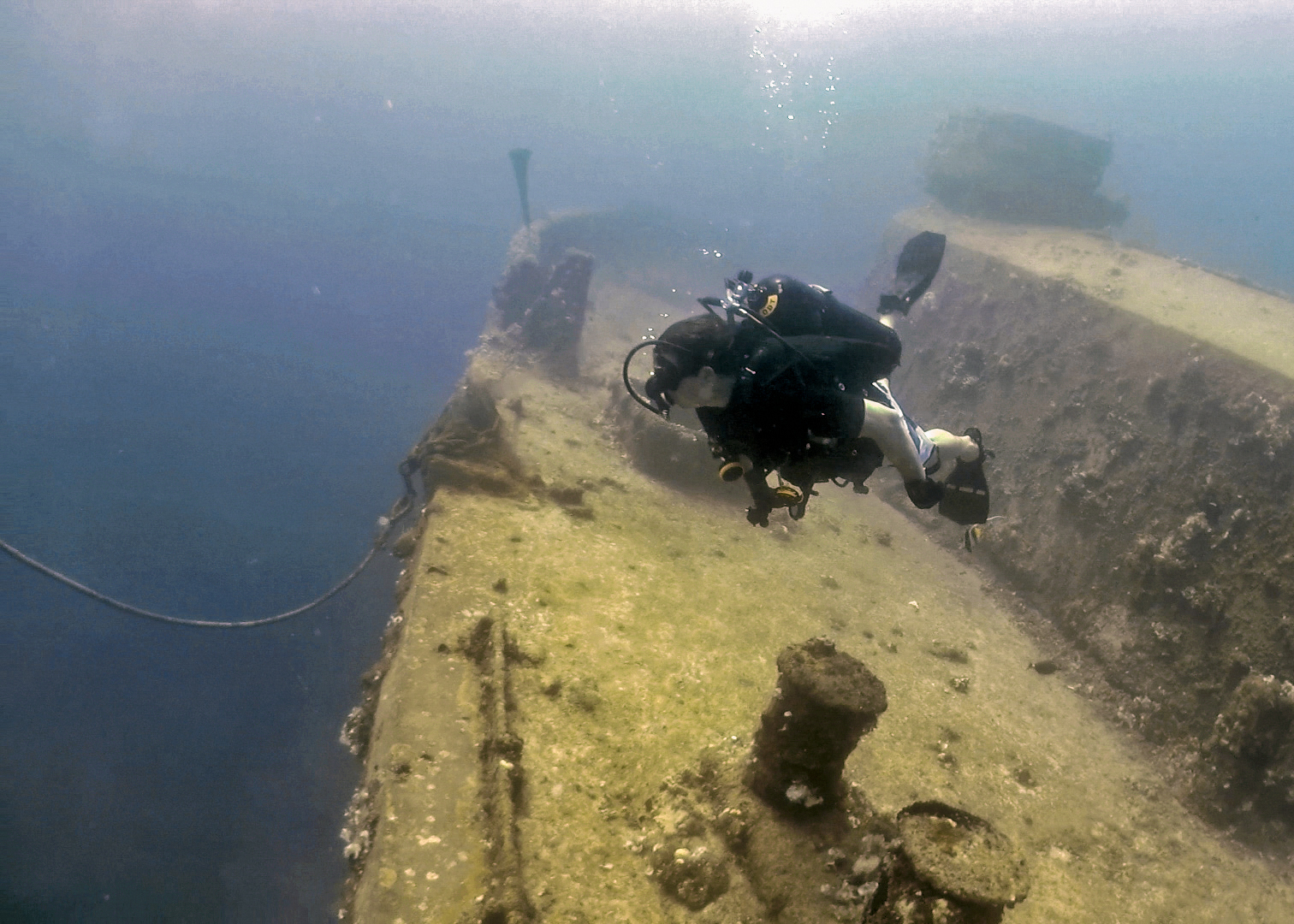
Scuba diver on a shipwreck in Apra Harbor, 2017

Harbor beaches on Naval property include Gab Gab Beach and San Luis Beach on the Orote Peninsula, and Fantasy Island on Polaris Point. Beaches on Cabras include Family Beach and Outhouse Beach. Port Authority Beach is located on the north shore of Drydock Island.

Apra Harbor hosts a robust coral reef community and many shipwrecks. There are many named scuba diving sites either within or immediately outside the harbor, including: Harley Reef; SMS Cormoran and Tokai Maru, allowing divers to touch wrecks from the two World Wars at the same time; Jade Shoals; Big Blue Reef; Middle Shoals; Western Shoals; Gab Gab; Finger Reef; American Tanker; Blue and White; Luminau; Blue Hole; Kizugawa Maru; and many others.

The outer shore of the Glass Breakwater is one of the most popular surfing spots on Guam, along with Talofofo Bay and Inarajan Bay.

=== Sasa Bay Marine Preserve ===
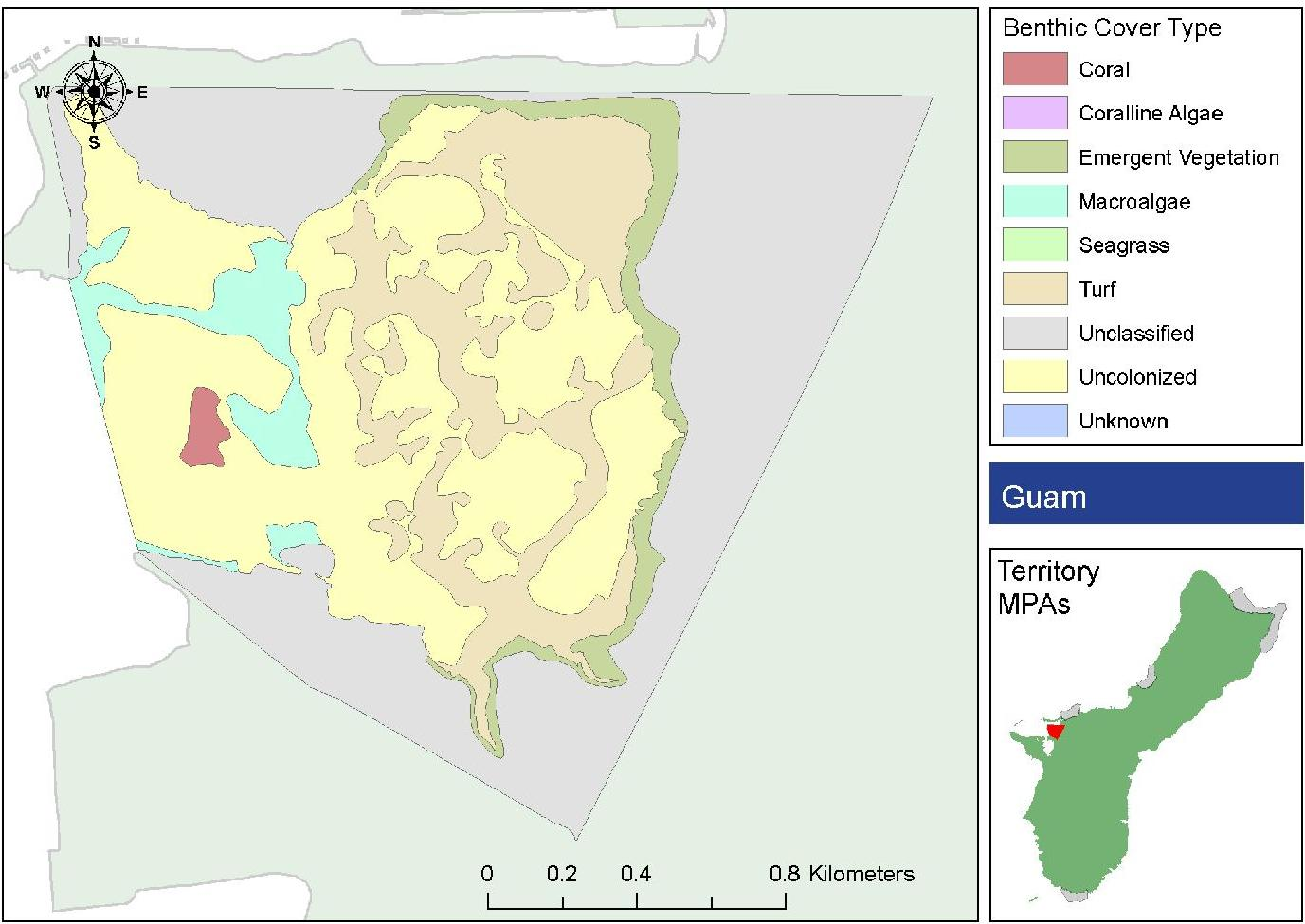
Benthic cover map for the Sasa Bay Marine Preserve, 2009

The Sasa Bay Marine Preserve, comprising waters and lands between Drydock Island and Polaris Point, is a recreational and ecological protected area with regulated fishing. Measuring 3.118 square kilometres (770 acres), it is one of five Marine Preserves created by the Government of Guam in 1997. The Preserve contains a mangrove swamp, is a foraging area for Hawksbill sea turtle and is habitat for several oyster and clam species. It also includes four or five patch reefs in its deeper waters.

== Management and ownership ==
Operations in Outer Apra Harbor are under the jurisdiction of The Port Authority of Guam and the United States Coast Guard. Vessels entering, leaving, or shifting berth in Apra Harbor are required to give 24 hours notice to the Port Authority of Guam Port Control Harbor Master and the U.S. Coast Guard Captain of the Port. Inner Apra Harbor is a restricted area that is marked by two uncharted buoys. Operations in Inner Apra Harbor are under the jurisdiction of the U.S. Navy Port Control Harbormaster.
