= Atantano Shrine =

- U.S. National Register of Historic Places
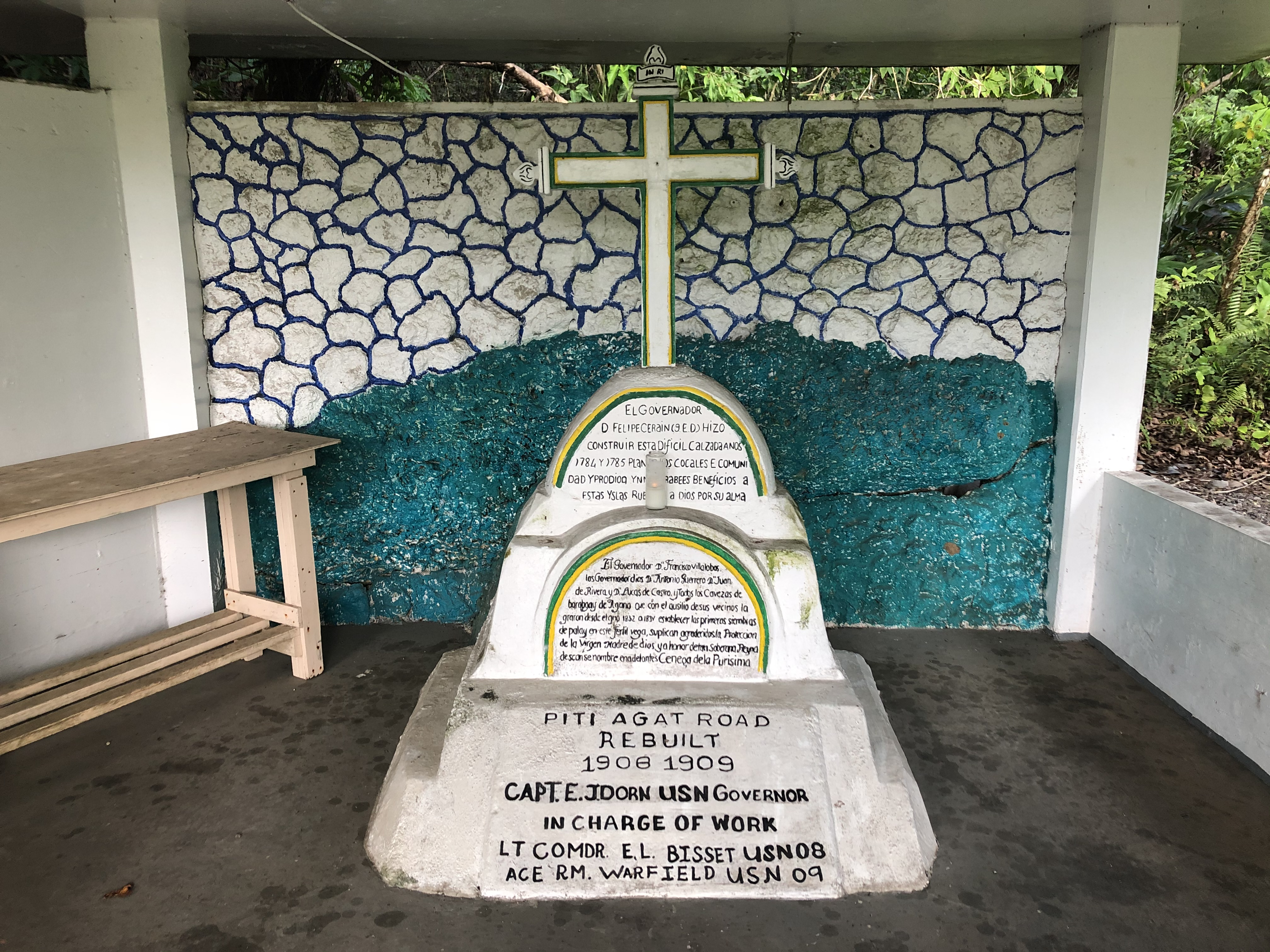
- Picture of Atantano Shrine from June 14, 2020.

- Location within Guam
- Location: 300 feet (91 m) southeast of Guam Highway 1 (Marine Drive), north of junction with Guam Highway 2A
- Nearest city: Piti, Guam
- Coordinates: 13°25′20″N 144°40′34″E
- Area: less than one acre
- Built: 1834
- NRHP reference No.: 95001367
- Added to NRHP: November 21, 1995

The Atantano Shrine is a historic commemorative marker near Piti, Guam. It is a pyramidal structure of coral limestone and concrete, about 2.5 metres (8.2 ft) in height, with base dimensions of 1.6 metres (5.2 ft). It is topped by a wooden cross and protected by an open concrete shelter. The monument was built in at least three stages, the early stages acting as bases for the mounting of the later ones. Panels on three sides carry inscriptions. The oldest inscription marks the initial construction of the road between Piti and Agat under the governorship of Don Felipe Cerain in 1784–85. The second inscription commemorates the creation of rice fields in the area under by Governor Don Francisco Villabos in 1832–34, and the third marks the reconstruction of the coast road during the governorship of Edward John Dorn in 1908–09. Commemorative markers of this type were a fixture of Spanish colonial administration that were adopted by Guamanians. The shrine has been the site of annual festivities since before World War II.

The marker's oldest inscription credits Governor Felipe Cerain not only with building a difficult road in 1784 and 1785 but also with planting the community's coconut trees. The shrine honours the Holy Cross (Sånta Cruz), and its annual fiesta, hosted by the Piti Mayor's Office and Municipal Planning Council, includes a nightly novena that ends with a Mass celebrated in Chamorro. Former landowners and residents of the area have taken part since 2022, and the 2024 fiesta marked the 240th anniversary of the coconut plantation and the 190th anniversary of the rice plantation at the site. In 2026 the novena ran from 24 April to 1 May, with the concluding novena and fiesta on 2 May. The site was listed on the National Register of Historic Places in 1995.

== See also ==
- National Register of Historic Places listings in Guam
