= Blue Hole (Guam) =

Submarine sinkhole off the west coast of Guam

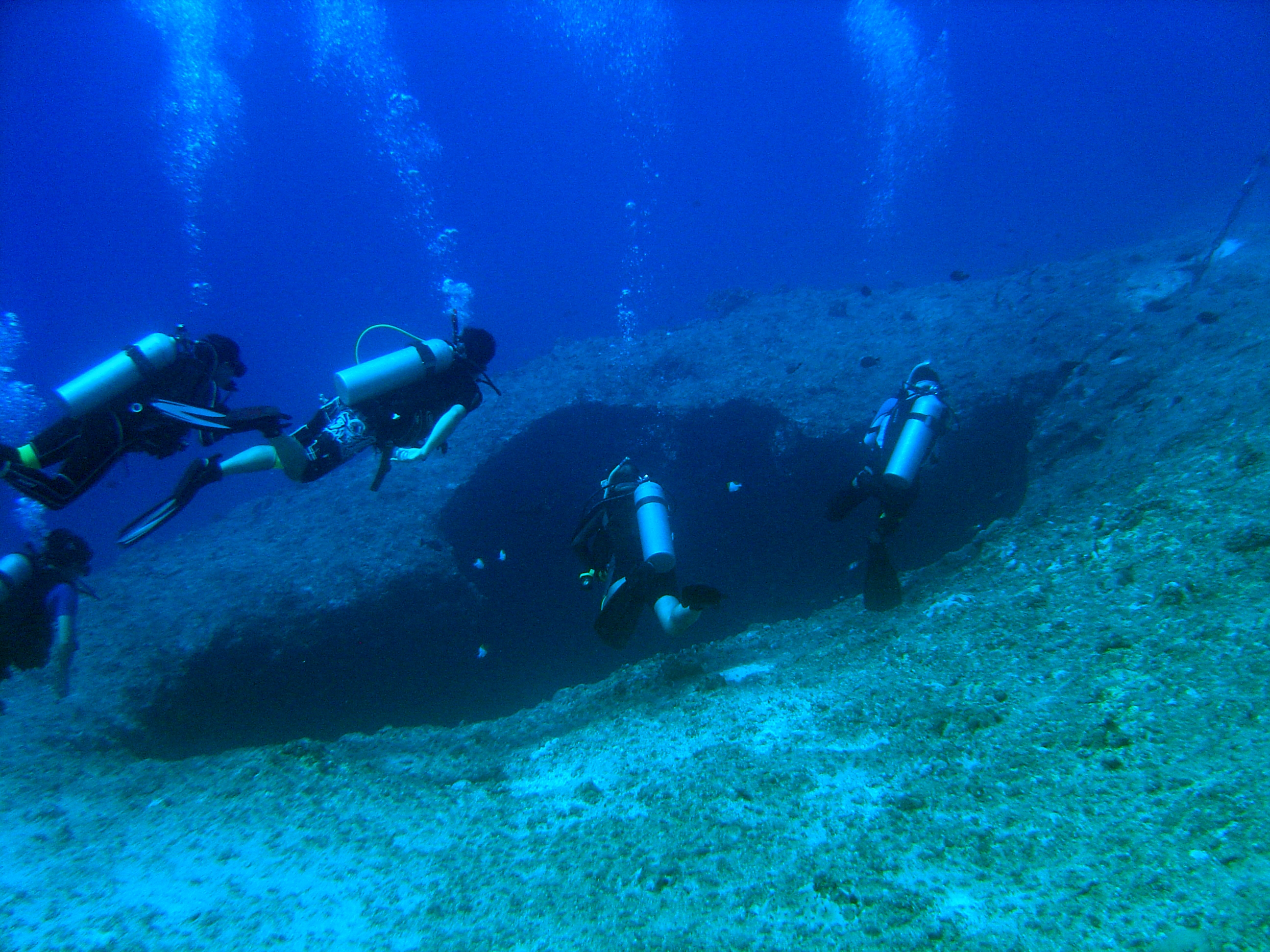
- Divers approaching the top of the Blue Hole sinkhole

- Location within Guam
- Location: Guam, USA
- Waterbody: Agat Bay
- Nearest land: Orote Peninsula
- Coordinates: 13.4400°N 144.6190°E
- Dive type: Open-water, Deep
- Depth range: 60 to 300 ft (18 to 91 m)
- Average visibility: 100 ft (30 m)
- Entry type: Boat
- Bottom composition: Rock
- Water: Salt

Blue Hole is a blue hole dive site off the western coast of Guam. It is variously described as "Guam’s signature natural feature dive," "the most requested dive site on Guam," and "one of Guam’s most popular divesites". It is located in northern Agat Bay, just south of the entrance to Apra Harbor. Despite being very close to the southern coast of the Orote Peninsula, sheer cliffs mean that it is done exclusively as a boat dive, typically out of Cabras Marina in Apra Harbor, located 20 minutes away. The top of the underwater sinkhole begins at about 60 ft (18 m) and drops to more than 300 ft (91 m). However, the sinkhole is located next to a wall and there is an opening that allows exit at about 130 ft (40 m), putting it just within the limits of an advanced recreational dive, depending on certifying agency. The opening of the sinkhole appears to be a heart shape to divers within it. While entry to the site is done while the dive boat is hooked into a mooring buoy, exit typically requires deploying a surface marker buoy in east-to-west current and pickup in the open ocean.

It is common to see large pelagic fish or sharks along the wall. The reef flat at 60 feet has several coral patches and schooling Tisch . During 2004, the endemic Guam Pencil dottyback (Lubbockichthys myersi) was discovered here.

== See also ==
- Underwater diving on Guam
