= Agat Bay =

Bay in Guam

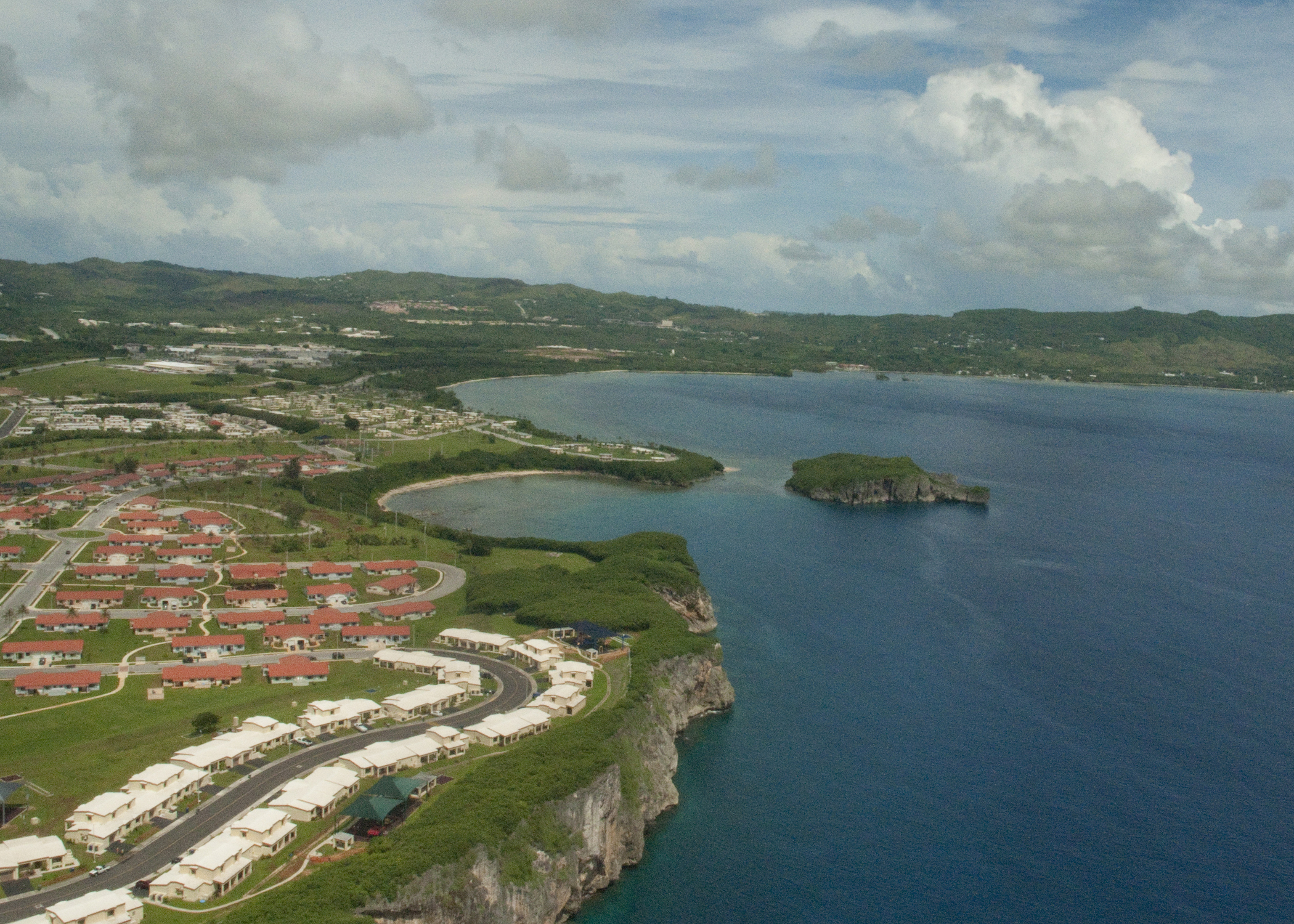
- Northern Agat Bay along the southern coast of the Orote Peninsula

- Location within Guam
- Location: Hågat / Sånta Rita-Sumai
- Coordinates: 13.39693°N 144.65475°E
- Primary inflows: Namo River, Finile Creek, Gaan River, and Auau Creek
- Ocean/sea sources: Philippine Sea

Agat Bay is a bay on the west coast of Guam. Its northern boundary is the Orote Peninsula, occupied entirely by Naval Base Guam, which itself lies within the village of Sånta Rita-Sumai. The bay stretches south along the coast of the village of Hågat (formerly, Agat) to Facpi Point. With a length of some seven kilometers, the bay stretches for nearly one fifth of the west coast of Guam. The Asan Invasion Beach of the 1944 Battle of Guam is commemorated by the Agat Unit of War in the Pacific National Historical Park, which spans surface and subsurface areas from Apaca Point to Bangi Point. The NRHP-listed Agat World War II Amtrac is submerged off Agat Cemetery.

The northern part of the bay is protected by an offshore reef. Blue Hole, one of Guam's most popular scuba diving sites, is located in the northwest corner of the bay. Agat Marina in the southern portion of the bay has 100 slips and mainly berths residential and recreational vessels, with some commercial vessels. Further south is Nimitz Beach, a popular snorkeling spot containing the small offshore Anae Island.
