= Cruising yacht =

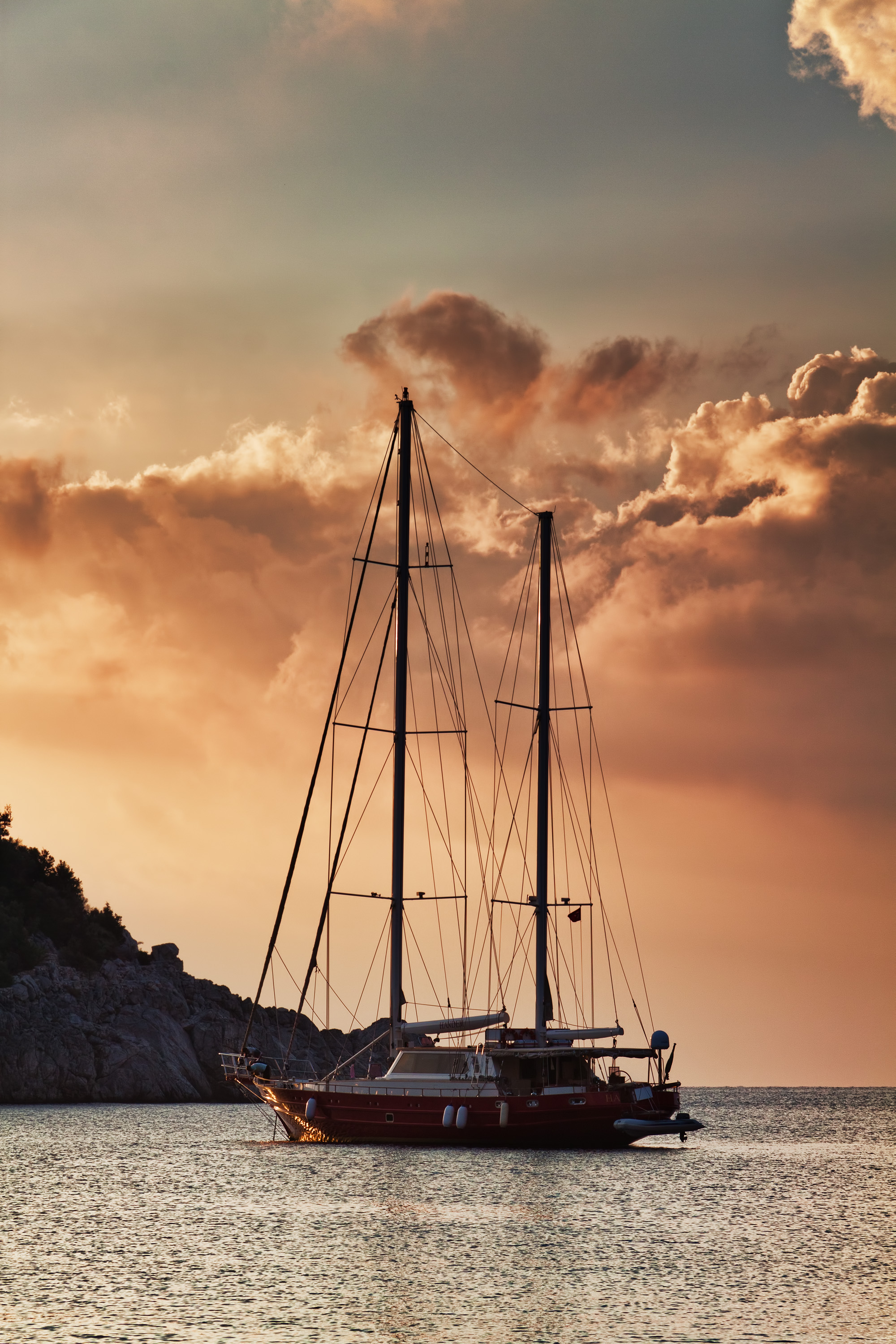
Ketch

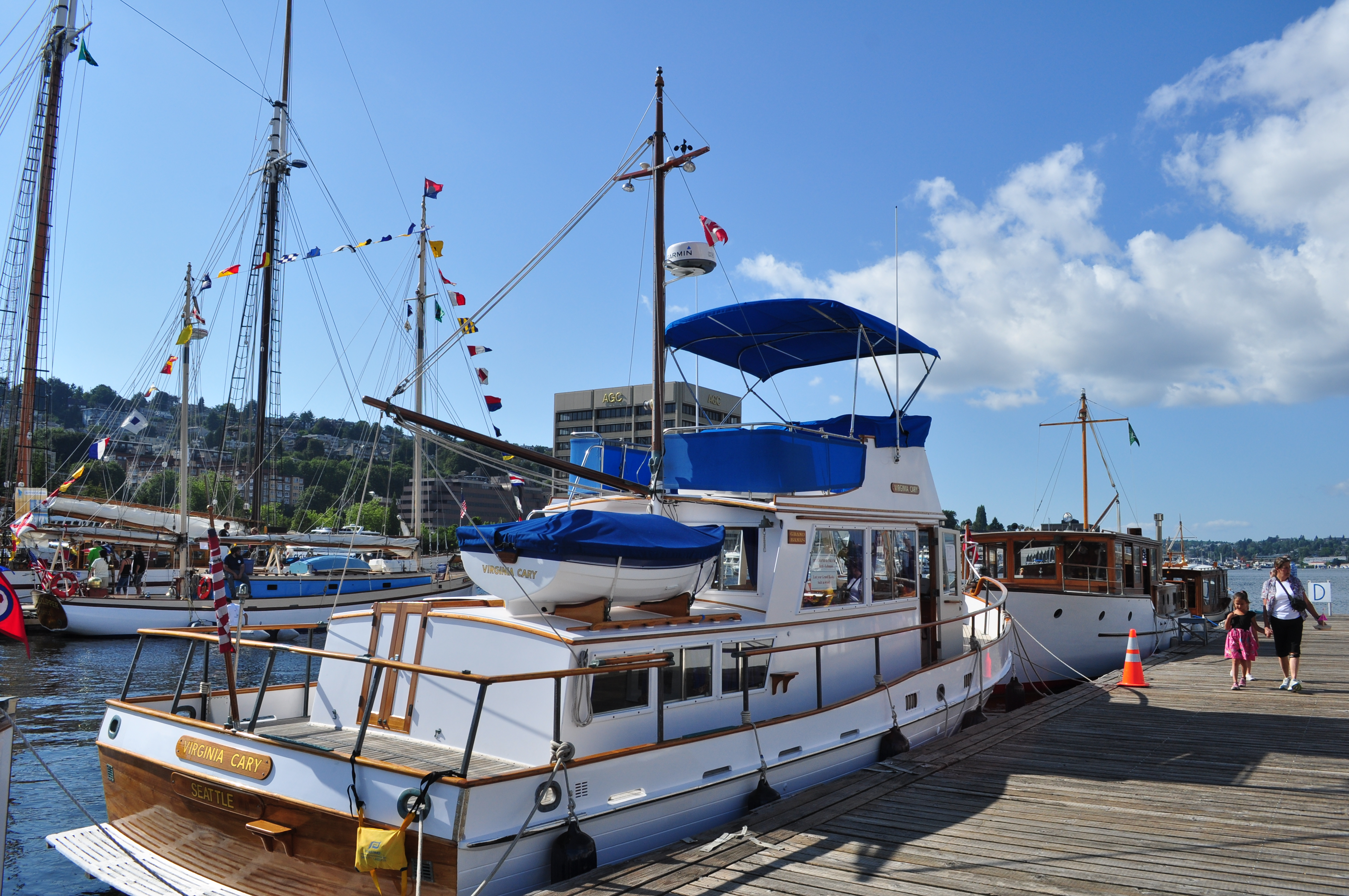
A "woodie" trawler-style cruising yacht by Grand Banks

A cruising yacht is a sailing or motor yacht that is suitable for long-distance travel and offers enough amenities to live aboard the boat, yet is small enough to not require a professional crew. A yacht that would require a professional crew enters the category of superyacht.

== Sail ==
Sailing cruising yachts are designed for multi-day voyages with the capacity for overnight passage making. Their range and endurance relies primarily on sail power and the storage of provisions for the crew.

== Power ==
Power cruising yachts are designed for multi-day voyages with the capacity for overnight passage making. Their range and endurance relies primarily on fuel supply and the storage of provisions for the crew.

== See also ==
- Cruising (maritime)
- Cruising Club of America
- Cruising Yacht Club of Australia
