= Port of Guam =

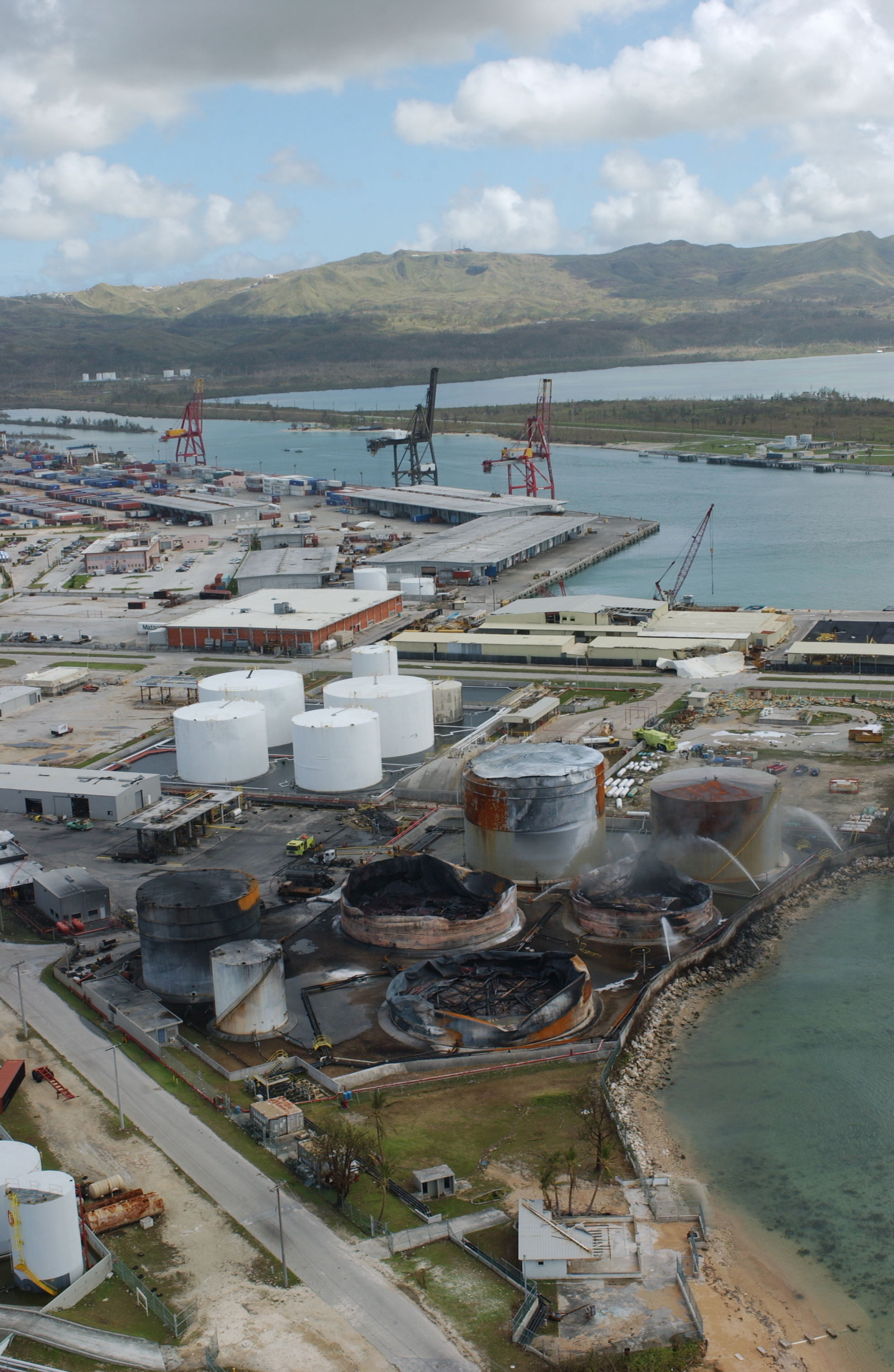
- Firefighters extinguish fires from jet fuel tanks at the Port that were burning out of control due to Typhoon Pongsona, 2002

Location
- Country: United States
- Location: Apra Harbor, Pacific Ocean
- Coordinates: 13°27′40.52″N 144°40′12.15″E

Details
- Operated by: Port Authority of Guam
- Owned by: Government of Guam
- General Manager: Rory J. Respicio

Statistics
- Annual cargo tonnage: 1,112,106 (FY2020)
- Annual container volume: 85,143(FY2020)
- Website www.portofguam.com

The Port of Guam (officially, Jose D. Leon Guerrero Commercial Port) handles over ninety percent of total imports to the United States island territory of Guam. Located in the north of Apra Harbor on Cabras Island, it shares harbor waters with Naval Base Guam and two small marinas. Family Beach on the Glass Breakwater is owned by the Port Authority of Guam, as well as numerous other water recreational businesses leased by the Authority.

== History ==
After taking possession of the island in the 1898 Spanish–American War, the United States operated it as its coaling and shipping station in the western Pacific. Except for the Japanese occupation of Guam from 1941 to 1944, the territorial Naval Administration ran the commercial port until 1951, when the 24 acres of commercial port was transferred to the United States Department of Commerce. In 1962, the Interior Department transferred the commercial port to the Government of Guam. Over 1,000 acres was eventually transferred from the federal government to the Government of Guam for port use. The Port Authority of Guam was established as an autonomous public corporation by law in 1975. In 2002, the Port of Guam was officially renamed Jose D. Leon Guerrero Commercial Port, after the first commercial port manager.

The Port Authority also manages two separate marinas: Gregorio D. Perez Marina (formerly, Agana Boat Basin) in Hagåtña and Agat Marina in Agat.
