= Capture of Guam (1898) =

U.S. occupation of Guam during the Spanish-American War

- Part of the Spanish–American War
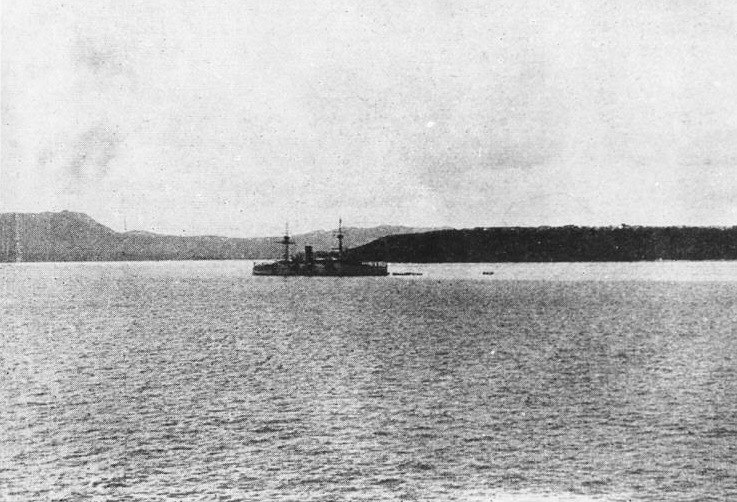
- USS Charleston entering Agana, c. 1898
Date	June 20–21, 1898
Location	Guam 13.4671°N 144.6907°E
Result	American victory

Belligerents
United States	Spain

Commanders and leaders
Henry Glass	Juan Marina (surrendered)

Strength
1 protected cruiser 3 transports	54

Casualties and losses
None	54 captured

The capture of Guam from Spain by the United States took place in a bloodless engagement during the Spanish–American War.

The U.S. Navy sent a single cruiser, USS Charleston, and three vessels of marines to capture the island of Guam, which was a Spanish possession. The Spanish garrison on the island had no knowledge of the war and no real ability to resist the American forces. They surrendered without resistance, and the island passed into American control. The event was the only conflict of the Spanish–American War on Guam.

== Background ==
Guam had been under Spanish control since 1668. By the time of the war, Guam had been neglected and there was only a small Spanish military presence. The last message the authorities on Guam had received from Spain was dated April 14, 1898, a month before war was declared.

U.S. Navy Captain Henry Glass, captain of the cruiser Charleston, set sail from San Francisco to Manila on May 21, 1898. According to the ship's muster roll on May 5, most of the 233 sailors on board for the coming voyage were fresh recruits who had joined the Navy after USS Maine blew up in February that same year. There was also a 30-person U.S. Marine contingent and three journalists. The Marines were commanded by Second Lieutenant John Twiggs Myers. Charleston had originally set sail on May 18, but on the morning of May 19 she had to return to port for condenser tube repairs. After completing repairs, she left port again on May 21. Charleston then stopped in Honolulu to meet up with three transport ships: City of Peking, City of Sydney, and Australia. The transports carried the following military units:

Military units carried by transport vessels
Vessel	Military units
Australia	2nd Oregon Volunteer Infantry Regiment (part)
City of Peking	First California Volunteer Infantry Regiment
City of Sydney	2nd Oregon, Companies F, I, and M; 14th U.S. Infantry, Companies A C, D, E, and F California Volunteer Heavy Artillery, Batteries A and D

On June 4, Glass and his convoy left Honolulu with sealed orders. On June 5th Glass called everyone to the quarterdeck and opened his orders. They read:

Upon the receipt of this order, which is forwarded by the steamship 'City of Pekin' to you at Honolulu, you will proceed, with the 'Charleston' and the 'City of Pekin' in company, to Manila, Philippine Islands. On your way, you are hereby directed to stop at the Spanish Island of Guam. You will use such force as may be necessary to capture the port of Guam, making prisoners of the governor and other officials and any armed force that may be there. You will also destroy any fortifications on said island and any Spanish naval vessels that may be there, or in the immediate vicinity. These operations at the Island of Guam should be very brief, and should not occupy more than one or two days. Should you find any coal at the Island of Guam, you will make such use of it as you consider desirable. It is left to your discretion whether or not you destroy it. From the Island of Guam, proceed to Manila and report to Rear-Admiral George Dewey, U.S.N., for duty in the squadron under his command.

Australia and City of Sydney departing from San Francisco, on their way to the Philippines

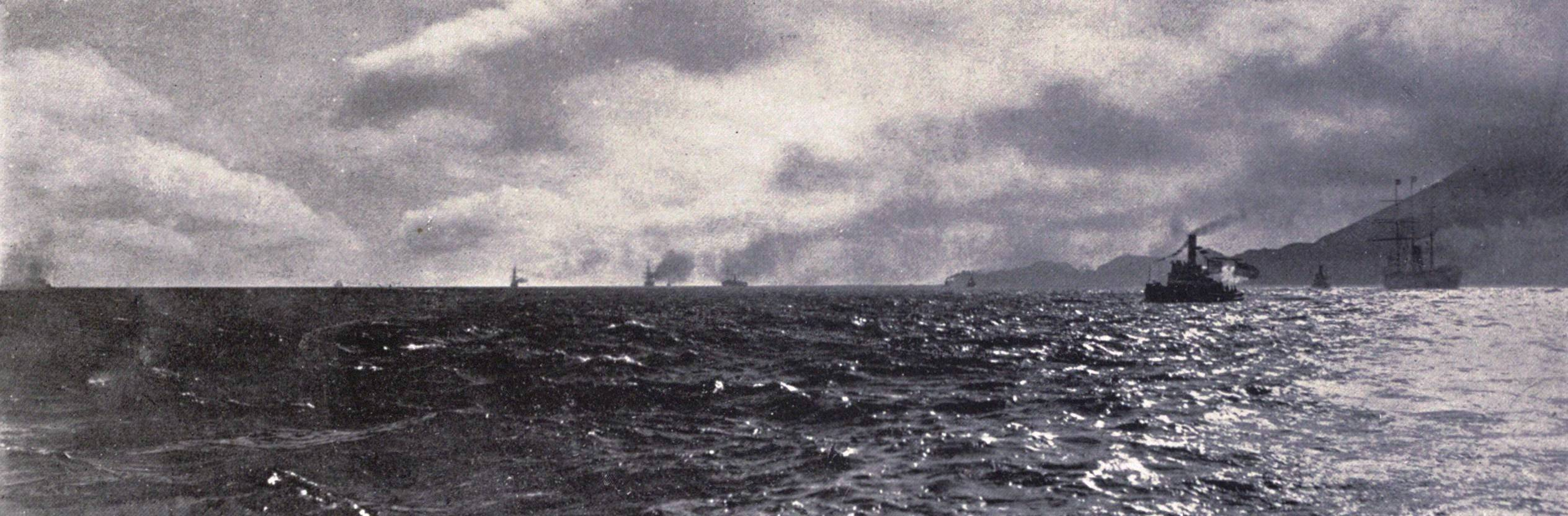
City of Peking, City of Sydney, and Australia passing through the Golden Gate

The message created intense excitement and enthusiasm amongst the American sailors. Many of them immediately went to the ship's library and eagerly scrutinized charts, geographies, histories, and encyclopaedias for information. While the sailors were in the ship's library learning about Guam, Glass altered the direction of the cruiser towards the new destination. The sailors on the transports were stirred when they noticed the change in direction, and rumors were spread. Some thought the expedition was to hoist the American flag over the Caroline Islands and remain there until reinforcements arrived for a stronger descent upon Manila. Others guessed that Charleston was sailing to some mysterious Spanish island, complete with impregnable fortifications, a formidable force of Spanish soldiers, and vast quantities of coal. The rumors stopped the next day, when the expedition's objectives were wigwagged to the transports.

Along with the sealed orders were warnings of possible Spanish men-o-war in San Luis d'Apra, the main port of Guam, and notification of it being protected by a heavy battery of guns. The existence of the powerful coastal defences was verified by reputable travelers who had visited the island in 1895 or 1896. Definite information of the size of the Spanish garrison was not given. In the absence of direct knowledge, Glass had to assume that there might be more than a thousand fighting men on the island who were thoroughly familiar with the terrain. Glass held a conference on Australia and invited General Anderson, Commander William C. Gibson, naval officer in charge of the transports, and the captains of the three troop carriers were invited to participate in the discussions. Also present at the meeting was Captain T. A. Hallet, third officer of Australia and a former whaling captain, who had been to the Mariana Islands many times. Hallet told the group that on his last visit to Guam, San Luis d'Apra was strongly fortified. Fort Santa Cruz and the battery on Point Orote, he stated, were efficiently manned and equipped. After a complete appraisal of all the known and unknown factors in the impending battle, the officers completed the arrangements for the attack on Guam.

It was soon noticed by the troops that Charleston expected a fight, since the cruiser began firing sub-caliber ammunition at boxes tossed from City of Peking. This mild training continued until the afternoon of June 15 when Charleston started circling and firing service charges at pyramidal cloth targets set adrift from the cruiser. The range was about 2 mi (1.7 nmi; 3.2 km), and the gun crews (which were composed largely of recruits who had not seen combat, under the command of Second Lieutenant John Twiggs Myers) were shooting accurately enough to cause Glass to smile pleasantly. By the time the convoy crossed the 180th meridian, the officers and men felt they were ready for the enemy.

On June 18, an Associated Press reporter on the ship reported that the crew had secured important items and started laying protective netting around parts of the ship to protect against flying debris during a battle.

== Capture ==
On June 19, the convoy stopped and Captain Thomas A. Hallett from Australia boarded Charleston. Hallett had been to Guam before, and they decided Hallett should be the pilot for Charleston as she entered the waters near Guam. On June 20, the convoy arrived off the shore of Guam, and Glass noticed that the only ship in the harbor was a Japanese ship that was trading copra. Many men aboard Charleston were disappointed that there were no Spanish ships to engage.

As the cruiser proceeded on its way, a small group of curious inhabitants gathered on the shores of Piti, a landing place down the bay. These locals were aware of the presence of the American vessels, for they had been sighted early that morning. All of the important citizens of Guam were there except Governor Don Juan Marina. The chief officials present were Don Francisco Gutiérrez, a lieutenant commander of the navy and captain of the port, Don José Romero, naval surgeon, Captain Pedro Duarte Andurra, of the marine corps, and José Sixto, civil paymaster. Among the prominent civilians at the beach were Francisco Portusach, an American citizen and the leading merchant of Guam, and his brother José Portusach.

While the gathering was looking curiously at the cruiser and the three transports, Charleston fired 13 rounds at the old Spanish fortress from three of her 3-pounder guns. There was no return fire, and there was no apparent damage to the fort. Pedro Duarte turned to his companions and said that the ship must be saluting the fort, so he hurriedly dispatched a messenger to Agana, the capital, which was about 6 mi (9.7 km) away, requesting the governor to send artillery to Piti to return the salute. The captain of the port, the naval surgeon, and a native Chamorro named José Paloma got into a boat furnished by Francisco Portusach and went out to welcome the visitors. José Portusach went along with the party to act as interpreter. When they boarded Charleston, they apologized for not being able to return the salute due to a lack of ammunition. Glass then replied, "What salute? Those were hostile shots" and informed them that war had been declared between the U.S. and Spain on April 25.

The Spanish officials were amazed when they heard this and the news that they were now prisoners of war, because no dispatches or mail had arrived since April 9 to enlighten them. They were then paroled for the day when they promised to return to Agana to inform the governor of the war and notify him to appear on board the American ship immediately. The party then went below deck into the captain's cabin to discuss the surrender of the island.

Francisco Portusach agreed to provide the crew the use of two lighters and a boat to transfer coal from City of Peking to the bunkers of Charleston. Portusach returned to Piti where his brother was waiting for him. Francisco then ordered his men to deliver the lighters and boats to Charleston early in the morning. When he arrived home, a letter was waiting for Francisco from Governor Marina which said: "If you give any assistance to the American men of war, you will be executed tomorrow morning at the beach." Later that afternoon, Francisco Portusach returned to Charleston with the threatening note from Marina and showed it to Glass. They had conferred less than half an hour when the governor's secretary returned to the cruiser with a letter which said:

Agana, June 20, 1898.
Mr. Henry Glass,
Captain of the North American Cruiser Charleston:
By the captain of the port in which you have cast anchor I have been courteously requested, as a soldier, and, above all, as a gentleman, to hold a conference with you, adding that you have advised him that war has been declared between our respective nations, and that you have come for the purpose of occupying these Spanish islands.

It would give me great pleasure to comply with his request and see you personally, but, as the military laws of my country prohibit me from going on board a foreign vessel, I regret to have to decline this honor and to ask that you will kindly come on shore, where I await you to accede to your wishes as far as possible, and to agree as to our mutual situations. Asking your pardon for the trouble I cause you, I guarantee your safe return to your ship.

Very respectfully,
JUAN MARINA
The Governor

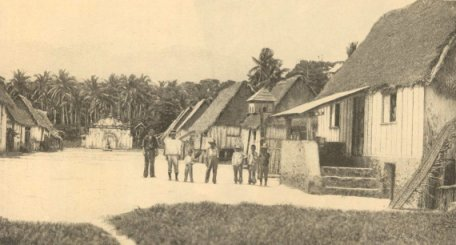
The village of Piti

Glass suspected that the governor was perpetrating a trick. An ultimatum was prepared for delivery to the governor of Guam, and arrangements were made for a presentation of it on the following morning. At 8:00am on June 21, Lieutenant William Braunersreuther, one of Glass's aides, was waiting to take command of a landing party composed of the Marines from Charleston and City of Peking, and two companies of the Oregon volunteer regiment on Australia. He had specific instructions to go ashore and capture the governor, his officers, and any armed forces on the island.

The men had difficulty in getting the boats ready, so Braunersreuther left without them in a small boat, merely taking with him Ensign Waldo Evans, four sailors, and two journalists, Douglas White and Sol Sheridan. He landed at the harbor of Piti, and there he was met by Governor Marina and his staff. After formal introduction, Braunersreuther handed the governor the ultimatum from Glass: "Sir: In reply to your communication of this date I have now, in compliance with the orders of my government, to demand the immediate surrender of the defenses of the Island of Guam, with arms of all kinds, all officials and persons in the military service of Spain now in this island. This communication will be handed to you tomorrow morning by an officer who is ordered to wait not over one half hour for your reply."

The time was 10:15am and having called the governor's attention to the fact that only 30 minutes were allowed for a reply, Braunersreuther casually reminded him of the three transports loaded with troops and the formidable war vessel in the harbor. Marina and his advisers went into a nearby boatshed for consultation. They reappeared and handed a sealed envelope to Braunersreuther, who amid protest from the governor, broke the seal and read the message which contained a notification of the surrender of the island of Guam. He then said, "Gentlemen, you are now my prisoners; you will have to repair on board the Charleston with me."

The governor protested, claiming that he had not expected such action. Braunersreuther replied that he had merely been instructed to deliver a letter and since he was now in possession of an offer of complete surrender, the Americans were permitted to make any demand they wished. The Spanish officials were allowed to write letters to their families. Afterward, Marina and his staff were taken to City of Sydney after sending an order to Agana for the Spanish soldiery and native militia to be at Piti landing no later than four o'clock that afternoon.

Braunsreuther then returned to the ships, obtained the Marine guard, and returned to shore, where the Spanish soldiers were lined up awaiting surrender. Lieutenant John Twiggs Myers, later known for his command during the Boxer Rebellion, marched the Marines through the boathouse and lined them up so that the Spanish and native troops were between the Americans and the ocean. The 54 Spanish regulars and two lieutenants were disarmed, placed in a sampan, and transported to City of Sydney.

== Aftermath ==
Glass went ashore and at 2:45pm raised an American flag over the Santa Cruz Fort while the bands aboard Australia and City of Peking played "The Star-Spangled Banner". After the bands ceased, a 21-gun artillery salute rang out from one of the ships. Guam was now captured. Glass's orders included destroying the island's forts, but he decided that they were in such disrepair that he left them as they were.

Francisco Portusach and his workers completed transferring the coal from City of Peking to Charleston on June 22. Afterward, Glass took him to his cabin, and appointed him governor of the island, until the arrival of proper American authority. Charleston and the three transports left the harbor at 4:00pm on June 22, later joining Dewey's fleet at Manila.

Guam was officially given to the U.S by Spain in the December 1898 Treaty of Paris and U.S Navy Commander E.R. Taussig took control of the island in February 1899. Naval Station Guam was founded August 7, 1899, and President William McKinley ordered that the whole island be classified as a naval station and governed by a naval officer, the first of which was Captain R.P. Leary. Protests started in 1901 and citizens demanded that they be allowed to elect their own governor. In 1968 the U.S Congress passed the Elective Governor Act that allowed Guam to elect its own governor.
