= Atantano River =

Location
- Country: Guam

Physical characteristics
- Source
  - coordinates: 13.4044444°N 144.6941667°E
- Mouth
  - coordinates: 13.4272222°N 144.6727778°E

The Atantano River is a river in the United States territory of Guam.

== See also ==
- List of rivers of Guam
