= Asan (disambiguation) =

Asan is a city in South Korea.

Asan, Aşan, or ASAN may also refer to:

== People ==
- Asan people, a former Siberian ethnic group
- Aasaan (Āśān), Malayalam and Tamil surname and title in India
- Asen dynasty (also Asan), Byzantine dynasty

=== Individuals ===
- Asan, Qing Dynasty General
- Assan Takhtakhunov (born 1986), Kazakhstani ski jumper
- Asan Kasingye (born 1964), Uganda police officer
- Asan Khaliev (1915–1997), Soviet Crimean sniper
- Asan Mustafayev (born 1965), Ukrainian-Tajikistani football coach and former player
- Asan Sabri Ayvazov (1878–1938), Crimean Tatar politician
- Haydar Aşan (1906–1996), Turkish–American sprinter
- Kalamandalam Kuttan Asan (1938–2022), Indian Kathakali exponent
- Kochukrishnan Asan (1756–1812), Indian astronomer
- Kumaran Asan, Indian poet
- Mustafa Aşan (born 1961), Turkish folklorist
- Ömer Asan (born 1988), Turkish footballer
- Ras Asan Olugbenga, American businessman

== Places ==
- Aşan, a village in Nagorno-Karabakh
- Asan, Guam, a community and census-designated place
- Asan-Maina, Guam, a village
- Asan, Iran, several localities
- Asan, Kathmandu, a market in Nepal
- Äsän, rural locality in Tatarstan, Russia
- Asan Circuit, motor racing circuit in Tokushima, Japan
- Asan River, river in Guam
- H. Asan Airport, domestic airport in Indonesia

=== India ===
- Asan, Firozabad, village in Uttar Pradesh
- Asan Barrage, Uttarakhand
- Asan Khurd, census town in Haryana

=== Nepal ===
- Asan, Kathmandu

=== South Korea ===
- Asan Bay
- Asan station
- Cheonan–Asan station

== Other uses ==
- ASAN service, service in Azerbaijan
- ASAN Radio, public radio station in Baku, Azerbaijan
- ASAN Visa, type of Azerbaijani visa
- Autistic Self Advocacy Network (ASAN)
- AddressSanitizer (ASan)
- Asan United FC, football club
- Chungnam Asan FC, South Korean football club
- Kott language, also known as Asan
- Terminalia elliptica, a tree, also known as Asana
- NYSE ticker symbol for Asana, Inc.

== See also ==
- Hasan, Hassan
