= Hassan =

Hassan, Hasan, Hassane, Haasana, Hassaan, Asan, Hassun, Hasun, Hassen, Hasson or Hasani may refer to:

== People ==
- Hassan (given name), Arabic given name and a list of people and fictional characters with that given name
- Hassan (surname), Arabic, Jewish, Irish, and Scottish surname and a list of people with that surname

== Places ==
- Hassan (crater), an impact crater on Enceladus, a moon of Saturn

=== Africa ===
- Abou El Hassan District, Algeria
- Hassan Tower, the minaret of an incomplete mosque in Rabat, Morocco
- Hassan I Dam, on the Lakhdar River in Morocco
- Hassan I Airport, serving El Aaiún, Western Sahara

=== Americas ===
- Chanhassen, Minnesota, a city in Minnesota, United States
- Hassan Township, Minnesota, a city in Minnesota, United States

=== Asia ===
- Hassan, Karnataka, a city and district headquarters in Karnataka, India
  - Hassan District, a district headquartered in Karnataka, India
  - Hassan (Lok Sabha constituency)
  - Hassan Airport, Karnataka
- Hasan, Ilam, a village in Ilam Province, Iran
- Hasan, North Khorasan, a village in North Khorasan Province, Iran
- Hasan, West Azerbaijan, a village in West Azerbaijan Province, Iran
- Hasani, Iran, a village in Fars Province, Iran
- Hasanov (town), a town in Tajikistan
- Hasan, Turkmenistan, a village in Turkmenistan
- Al-Hassan Stadium, a football stadium in Irbid, Jordan
- Hassan Town, a locality in Lahore, Pakistan
- Hasan or Khasan (urban-type settlement), a settlement in Primorsky Krai, Russia
- Lake Hasan or Lake Khasan, a lake in Primorsky Krai, Russia
- Mount Hasan, volcano in Turkey

=== Europe ===
- Hasan, Albania, a village in Durrës County, Albania
- Hašani, a village in Bosnia
- Hasanovići, a village in Bosnia
- Asanovac, a village in Serbia

== Sporting events ==
- Hassan II Trophy, a football tournament in Morocco
- Hassan II Golf Trophy, a golf tournament in Morocco
- Grand Prix Hassan II, a tennis tournament in Morocco

== Other uses ==
- Hasan (hadith), the categorization of a hadith's authenticity as acceptable for use as a religious evidence
- Hassan (play), a 1922 play by James Elroy Flecker
- Hassan Uprising (1903–1904), a rebellion among the Moro people during the Philippine–American War
- Hassans, the largest law firm in Gibraltar

== See also ==
- Bani Hasan (disambiguation)
- Khasan (disambiguation)
- Hassan Mosque (disambiguation)
- Beni Ḥassān, a historical Arabian nomadic group
  - Hassaniya, a variety of Arabic spoken by the Beni Hassan
- Awlad Hassan, an Arabic-speaking ethnic group of Sudan
- Asan, Guam, a community located on the U.S. territory of Guam
- Asan, a city in South Chungcheong Province, South Korea
- Hassane, the traditionally dominant warrior tribes of Mauritania and Western Sahara
- Hassan-i Sabbah, the founder of the Assassins
