= Asan Ridge Battle Area =

- U.S. National Register of Historic Places
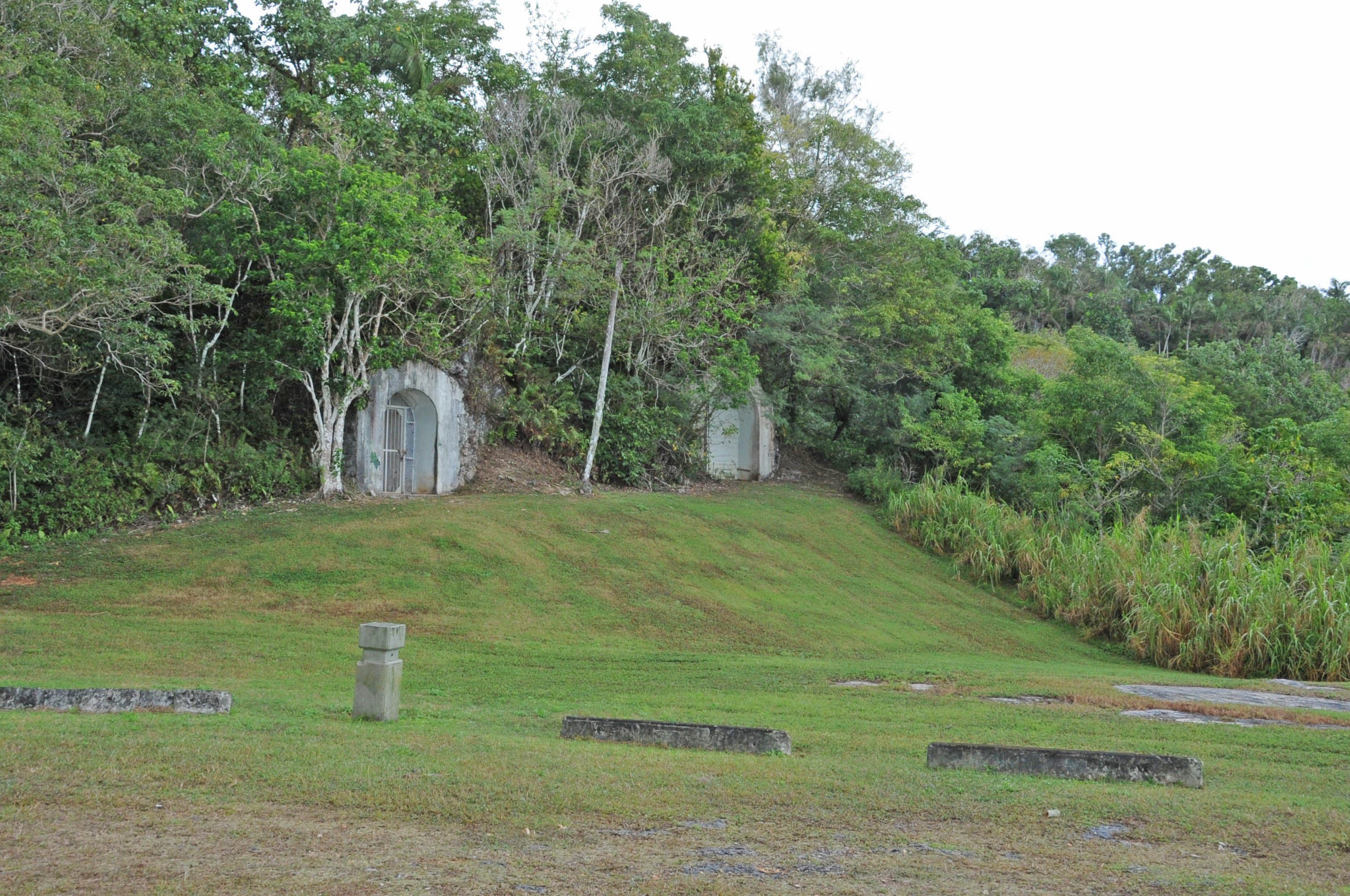
- Bunker on Nimitz Hill

- Location within Guam
- Location: Between Asan and Nimitz Hill, Asan-Maina, Guam
- Coordinates: 13°28′6″N 144°42′55″E
- Area: 550 acres (220 ha)
- Built: 1944
- NRHP reference No.: 75001916
- Added to NRHP: July 18, 1975

The Asan Ridge Battle Area was the scene of some of the heaviest fighting in the 1944 Battle of Guam, the World War II battle in which Allied forces recaptured Guam from occupying Japanese forces. The area is now part of the Asan Inland Unit of the War in the Pacific National Historical Park, and was listed on the National Register of Historic Places in 1975. The area is just inland of the Asan Invasion Beach, one of the two major beachheads established by the Allies, and has a commanding view over that area. The landforms included in this area are Chorrito Cliff, Bundschuh Ridge, and Nimitz Hill, and they were heavily fortified by the Japanese prior to the battle. Surviving elements of these fortifications include two concrete pillboxes (one unfinished), and an unfinished battery of 4-inch guns.

== See also ==
- National Register of Historic Places listings in Guam
