= Nimitz Hill (CDP), Guam =

Nimitz Hill
- census-designated place
- CDP map
- Nimitz Hill CDP on Guam
- Coordinates: 13.4589°N 144.7048°E
- Country: United States
- Territory: Guam
- Village: Piti

Population (2010)
  - Total: 702

Nimitz Hill is a community and census-designated place (CDP) in Piti, Guam. is located immediately west of the Nimitz Hill Annex CDP in Asan-Maina, which contains the geographic feature of Nimitz Hill. In normal conversation, the Nimitz Hill CDP and Nimitz Hill Annex CDP are often collectively referred to as "Nimitz Hill."

Nimitz Hill is accessed and bounded to the south by Guam Highway 6, known as Spruance Drive in Piti. Taguag Cemetery, also known as Vicente A. Limtiaco Memorial Cemetery, lies to the southwest. Nimitz Hill CDP and the Asan Inland Unit of War in the Pacific National Historical Park form the western boundary. To the north is the uninhabited cliff area overlooking Piti Bay and Apra Harbor, with the Piti CDP below.
