= Piti, Guam =

Coordinates: 13°27′39″N 144°41′27″E

Piti
- Village
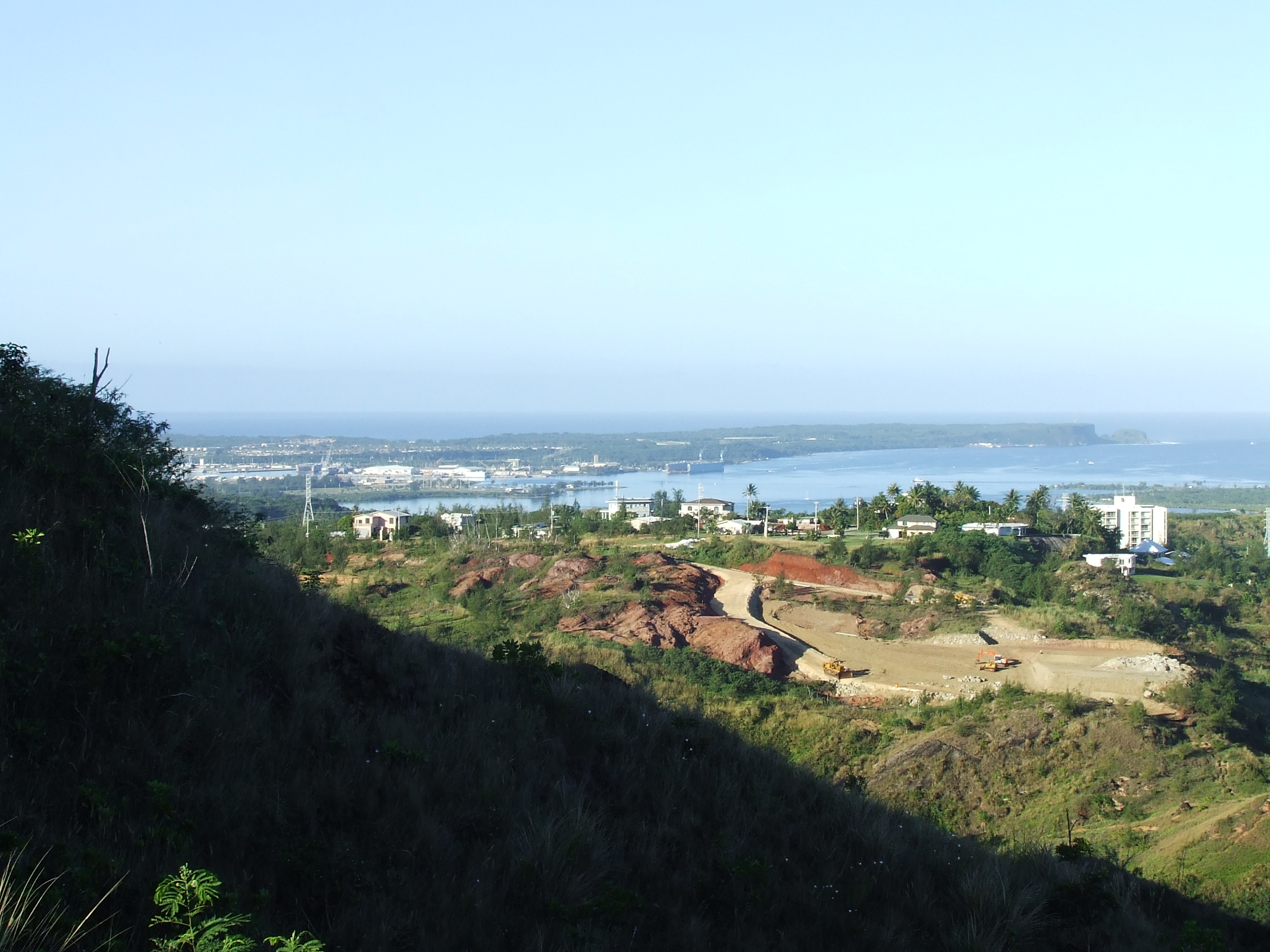

- Location of Piti within the Territory of Guam
- Country: United States
- Territory: Guam

Government
  - Mayor: Jesse L.G. Alig (R)

Population (2020)
  - Total: 1,585
  - Ethnic groups: Chamorro
- Time zone: UTC+10 (ChST)

Piti is a village located on the central west coast of the United States territory of Guam. It contains northern and eastern coastlines of Apra Harbor, including Cabras Island, which has the commercial Port of Guam and the island's largest power plants. Piti was a pre-Spanish Chamoru village and, after Spanish colonization, became the primary port town on Guam. The town was largely destroyed during the 1944 liberation of Guam and the population relocated during the wartime construction of Apra Harbor.

== Geography ==
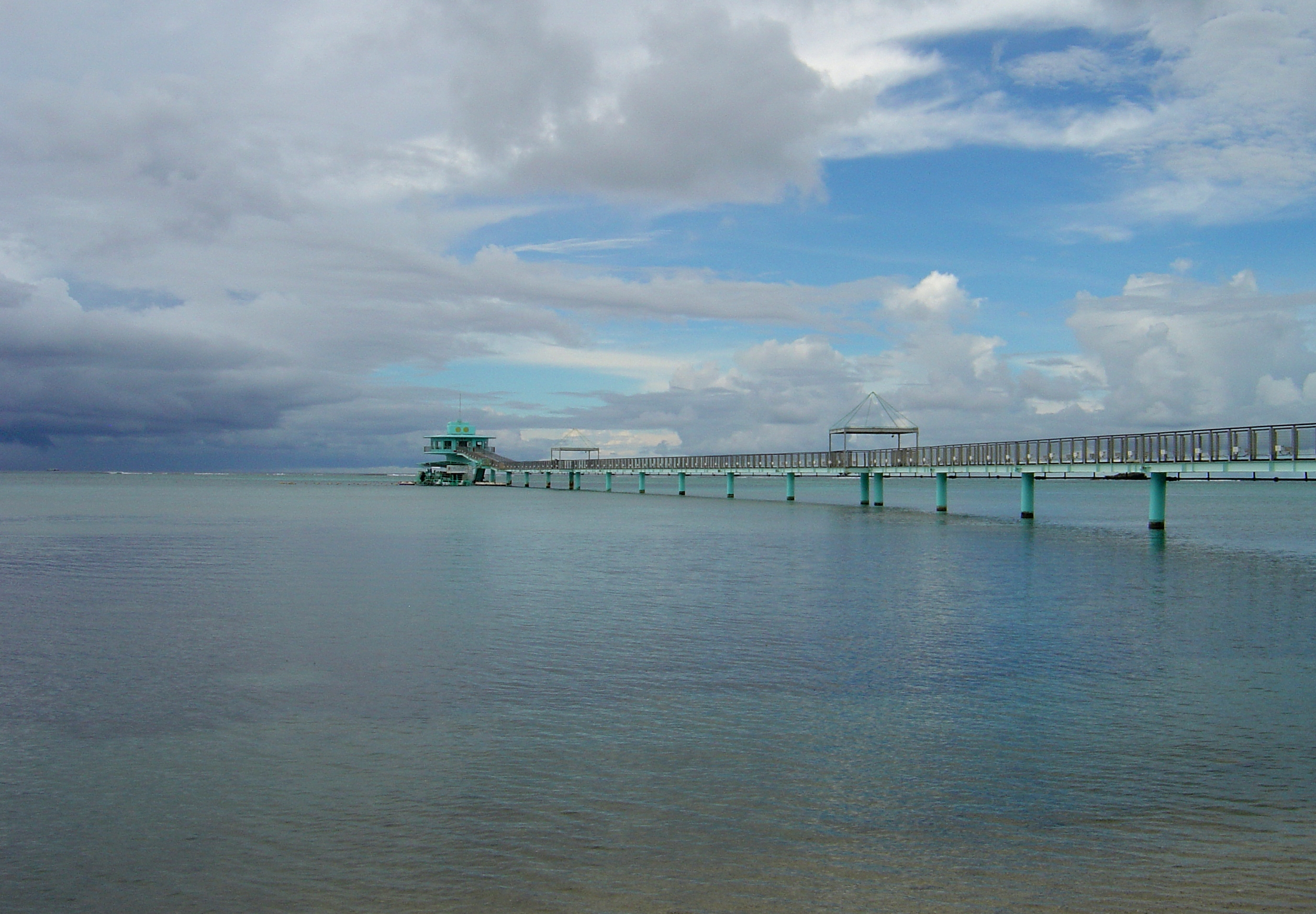
A tourist pier and underwater viewing tower in the Piti Bomb Holes Marine Preserve off the north coast of Piti

Piti is located along the coastline between the villages of Asan-Maina in the north and Santa Rita in the south. Its inland areas, which include Mount Tenjo (305 metres (1,001 ft)) and Mount Chacao (309 metres (1,014 ft)), borders Yona. Guam Highway 1, known as Marine Corps Drive, runs along the mainland coastline of the village. The Asan Memorial Beach Unit of War in the Pacific National Historical Park is at the northern boundary of Piti and the small hilly peninsula at Asan Invasion Beach is the northern physical marker of the Piti Bomb Holes Marine Preserve. The Preserve off the northeastern coast of the village has two beaches: Tepungan Beach Park and the Pedro Santos Memorial Park. Cabras Island, now artificially connected to the mainland, contains the main power plants for Guam and the Port of Guam .It is accessible from the intersection of Marine Corps Drive and Guam Highway 11, known as Cabras Road. The Glass Breakwater that extends westward from Cabras Island protects the northern side of Apra Harbor.

Most of the village population is located uphill of the intersection of Marine Corps Drive and Cabras Road. Jose L.G. Rios Middle School, the Piti Guns Unit of War in the Pacific National Historical Park, Our Lady of the Assumption Catholic Church, and village government buildings are located here. The Guam Veterans Cemetery is located immediately south, at the intersection of Marine Corps Drive and Guam Highway 6, known as Spruance Halsey Drive. Taguag Cemetery is located uphill on Highway 6, which provides southern access to Nimitz Hill, as well as Nimitz Hill Annex in Asan. Immediately south of this intersection is the intersection with Guam Highway 18, which provides access to Drydock Island, a small peninsula extending eastward into Apra Harbor. This provides access to Cabras Marina, military fuel wharves, and the Marianas Yacht Club. The yacht club is on Sasa Bay, another of Guam's marine preserves, located between Drydock Island and Polaris Point to the south. Polaris Point, the home base of Submarine Squadron 15, and other Naval Base Guam coastal area along northern Inner Apra Harbor to the east of Marine Corps Drive fall within Piti. The village boundary with Santa Rita is the Atantano River.

Inland of Marine Corps Drive are two military fuel tank farms under Joint Region Marianas at Sasa Valley and Tenjo Valley. The tank farms are supplied by two fuel wharves at the end of Drydock Island.

The village of Piti contains three NRHP-listed properties on land: the Atantano Shrine, the oldest portion of which commemorates the 1784-85 construction of the Piti-Hagåtña road; the Piti Guns, hauled by CHamoru forced labor into the hills during the Japanese occupation but not in operation at the time of the 1944 liberation; and the Quan Outdoor Oven, a 20th-century example of the traditional oven introduced by the Spanish in the 17th century. Two NRHP-listed shipwrecks, the SMS Cormoran and Tokai Maru, that lie at the bottom of Apra Harbor are technically within Piti.

== History ==
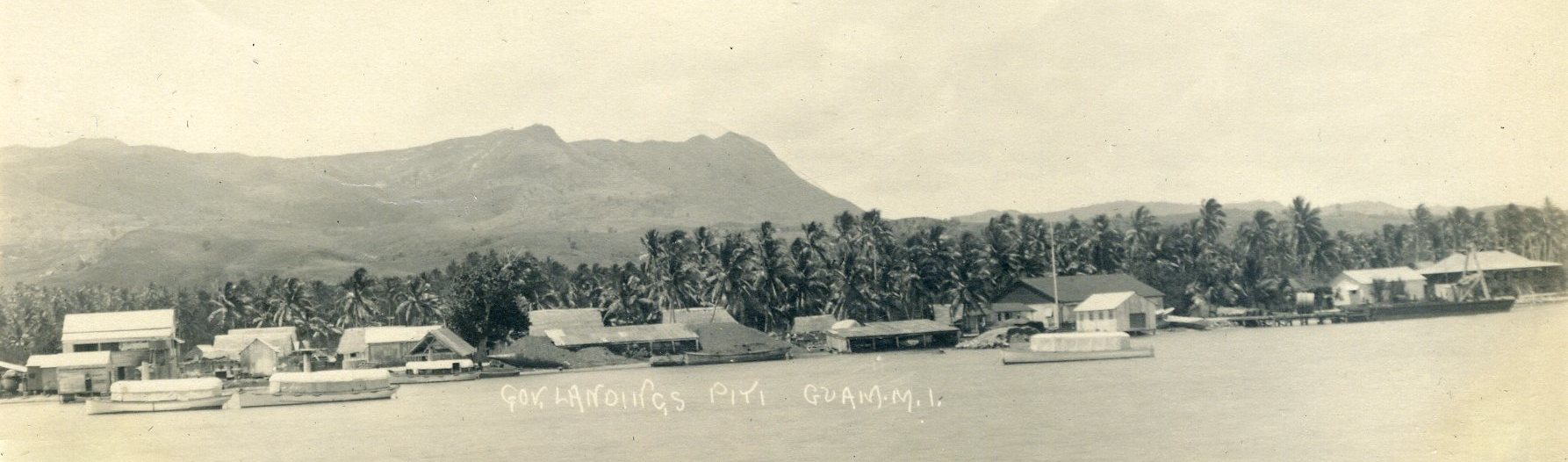
The Piti Navy Yard on Apra Harbor in 1914

Historical population
Census	Pop.	Note	%±
1960	1,467		—
1970	1,284		−12.5%
1980	2,866		123.2%
1990	1,827		−36.3%
2000	1,666		−8.8%
2010	1,454		−12.7%
2020	1,585		9.0%

Piti was an ancient Chamoru settlement before the arrival of Europeans. Its name likely derives from the Chamoru word puti, meaning to hurt or ache. However, the village was not strategically important on the island until the Spanish began to improve Apra Harbor in the early 1700s. After the 1740s and when the winds were favorable, most ships anchored in Apra Harbor and ferried their cargo to shore in small boats. From there, it was pulled in two-wheeled carts from Piti to the government store in Hagåtña. The crushed limestone road between Piti and Hagåtña was the only real road on Guam in this period. While pre-contact Chamorus had grown rice in natural swamps, the Spanish introduced the first rice paddy fields in Piti in the 1830s. Cultivation of rice in Piti continued through World War II. While Piti served as the main port entry for Guam, the village of Sumay, located on the southern shore of Apra Harbor, was the favored stop for the whaling ships of the early nineteenth century.

During the 1898 American Capture of Guam, Piti was the location of the formal Spanish surrender. The following year, the Americans established a Navy Yard at Piti, followed by a USDA agricultural experiment station in 1909. The Piti Navy Yard was one of the primary targets of Japanese bombing during the 1941 Japanese invasion, driving many residents to flee north on the road to Hagåtña. During the Japanese occupation of Guam, Chamorus were forced to expand Piti's rice fields to help feed the occupying troops. They were also forced to haul coastal defense guns into the Piti hillside, though they were not operational by the time of the American liberation in 1944. The U.S. military substantially reconstructed and altered the shoreline of Apra Harbor as Guam became a major base for the remainder of the Pacific War. In 1948, the U.S. government declared an eminent domain taking of parts of Piti, as well as Sumay and Agat, for little or no compensation, moving the local population from the harbor shoreline.

Notable residents include Benjamin Cruz (born 1951), a lawyer and politician.

== Government and infrastructure ==
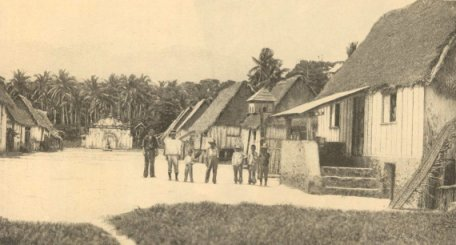
Village of Piti, 1900

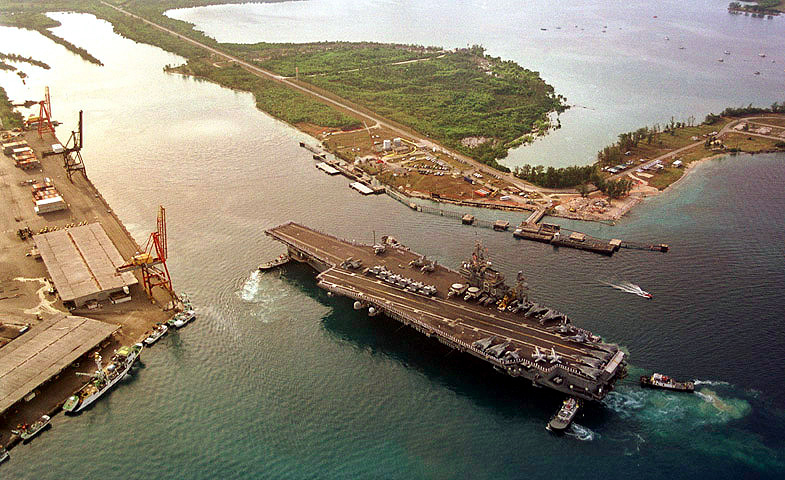
Aircraft carrier USS Kitty Hawk docking at the Port of Guam in 2000

The U.S. Census Bureau identifies two census-designated places in Piti: Piti, and Nimitz Hill.

=== List of mayors of Piti ===
Commissioner

- Manuel S. Santos (1933–1938)
- Juan B. Quenga Cruz (1938–1941)
- Gaily R. Kaminga (1952–1957)
- Vicente A. Limtiaco (1957–1973)

Mayor

- David B. Salas (1973–1981)
- Nieves F. Sablan (1981–1985)
- Bert S. Hedley (1985–1989)
- Isabel S. Haggard (1989–2005)
- Vicente "Ben" D. Gumataotao (2005–2017)
- Jesse L.G. Alig (2017–2022)

== Education ==
Guam Department of Education operates non-military public schools. Jose Rios Middle School is located in Piti. Secondary students go to Southern High School in Santa Rita.

In regards to the Department of Defense Education Activity (DoDEA), Piti is in the school transportation zone for McCool Elementary and McCool Middle School, while Guam High School is the island's sole DoDEA high school.
