= Guam Highway 7 =

Highway in Guam

Guam Highway 7
- GH-7 highlighted in red

Route information
- Maintained by Guam Department of Public Works

Major junctions
- West end: GH-6 in Asan-Maina
- East end: West O'Brien Drive (to GU-4) in Hagåtña

Location
- Country: United States
- Territory: Guam

Highway system
- Guam Highways
← GH-6	→ GH-8

Guam Highway 7 (GH-7) is one of the primary automobile highways in the United States territory of Guam.

== Route description ==
The route provides access to two primary locations: United States Naval Hospital Guam, on the north side of the road, and the community of Agana Heights, on the south side. It runs from a Y-junction with GH-6 near that highway's junction with GH-1 eastward toward Tatuhan Park, a unique hilled and triangle-shaped traffic junction just within Hagåtña. At Tatuhan Park, GH-7 comes down the hill to end at West O'Brien Drive, an unnumbered road that runs roughly south of and roughly parallel to GH-1 and continues eastward to GH-4 and eventually GH-8.

In addition to the Naval Hospital, GH-7 also provides access to Guam's Governor's House, the island's Office of Homeland Security and Civil Defense, and the historic Fort Santa Agueda.

== Major intersections ==
Location	mi	km	Destinations	Notes
Asan			GH-6	
Hagåtña			West O'Brien Drive	Connects to GU-4
1.000 mi = 1.609 km; 1.000 km = 0.621 mi
