= Asan River =

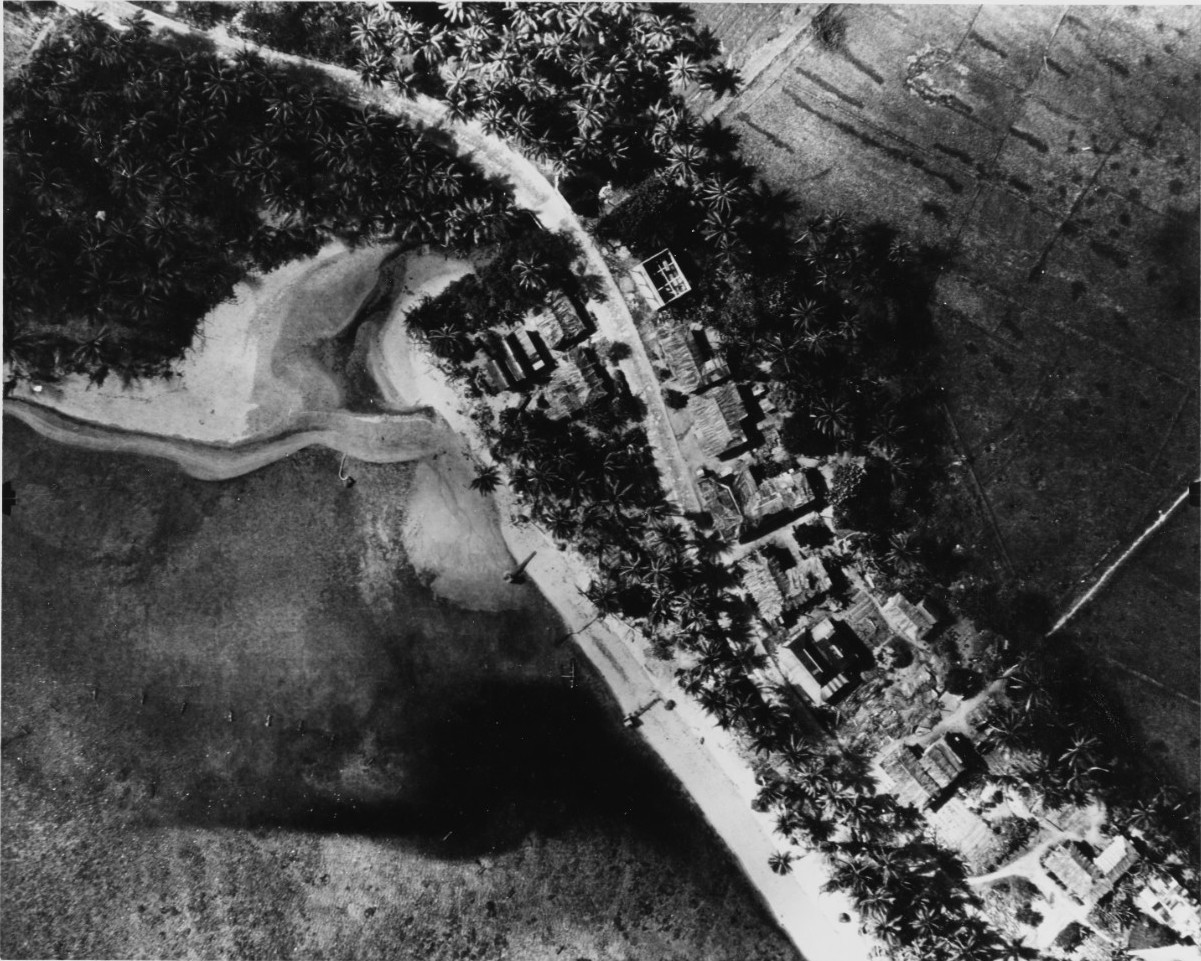
- The mouth of the Asan River in June 1944

Location
- Country: Guam

Physical characteristics
- Mouth
  - coordinates: 13°28′25.6″N 144°42′47.6″E

The Asan River is a river in the United States territory of Guam that lies entirely within the village of Asan-Maina. It originates in the highlands of Nimitz Hill Annex and flows through the Asan Inland Unit of War in the Pacific National Historical Park (WAPA) and enters the community of Asan. It then briefly re-enters WAPA at its Asan Inland Unit, with the mouth at the eastern end of Asan Memorial Park into Asan Bay. The river was thus a significant geographical feature of the Asan Invasion Beach for U.S. forces during the initial landings on Guam in July 1944.

== See also ==
- List of rivers of Guam
