= Guam Highway 6 =

Highway in Guam

Guam Highway 6
- Spruance Drive/Halsey Drive
- GH-6 highlighted in red

Route information
- Maintained by Guam Department of Public Works

Major junctions
- West end: GH-1 in Piti
- GH-7 in Asan-Maina
- East end: GH-1 in Asan-Maina

Location
- Country: United States
- Territory: Guam

Highway system
- Guam Highways
← GH-5	→ GH-7

Guam Highway 6 (GH-6) is one of the primary automobile highways in the United States territory of Guam. It is known as Spruance Drive within Piti and Halsey Drive within Asan-Maina: both named for noteworthy US Navy Admirals that served in the Pacific Ocean theater of World War II: Raymond A. Spruance and William Halsey Jr., respectively.

== Route description ==
The route creates a diversion along part of GH-1 into the highlands of Piti and Asan-Maina and is the primary means of reaching Nimitz Hill and Nimitz Hill Annex. Both termini are with GH-1, and the only other major junction is with the terminus of GH-7 near the eastern end, providing access to Naval Hospital Guam on Agana Heights.

== Major intersections ==
Location	mi	km	Destinations	Notes
Piti			GH-1 – Agat, Hagatna	Western terminus
Asan			GH-7 east – U.S. Naval Hospital Guam	
Asan			GH-1 – Agat, Hagatna	Eastern terminus
1.000 mi = 1.609 km; 1.000 km = 0.621 mi
