= War in the Pacific National Historical Park =

National Historical Park of the US

- IUCN category V (protected landscape/seascape)
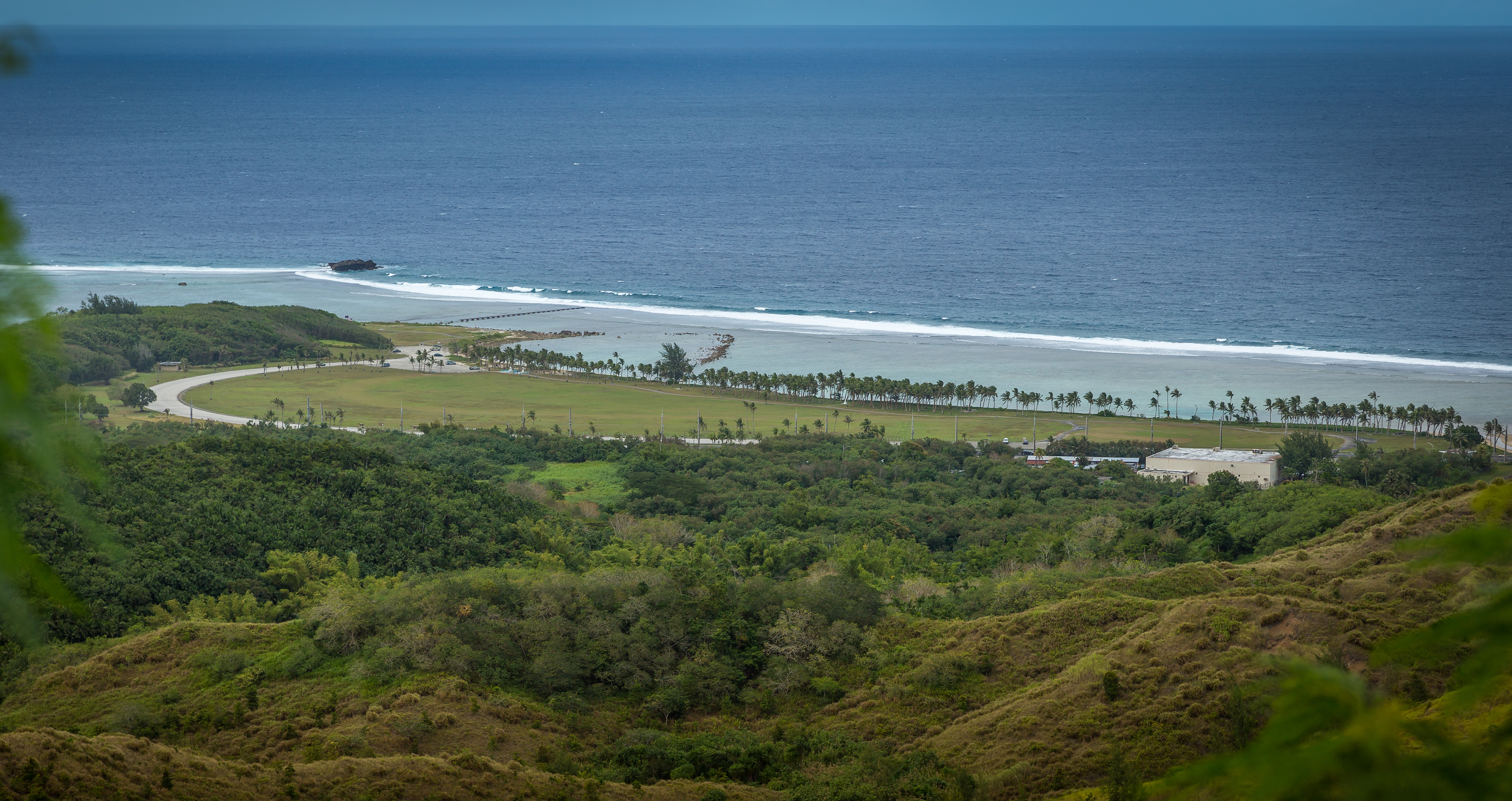
- The Park's Asan Beach Unit, as viewed from the Asan Inland Unit

- Location within Guam
- Location: Guam
- Nearest city: Asan, Guam
- Coordinates: 13°25′21.03″N 144°40′32.38″E
- Area: 2,037 acres (8.24 km^{2})
- Established: August 18, 1978
- Visitors: 397,733 (in 2025)
- Governing body: National Park Service
- Website: War in the Pacific National Historical Park
- War in the Pacific National Historical Park
- U.S. National Register of Historic Places
- U.S. Historic district
- Location: Marine Dr., Agana, Guam
- Area: 1,957.9 acres (792.3 ha)
- Built: 1944
- NRHP reference No.: 78003198
- Added to NRHP: August 18, 1978

The War in the Pacific National Historical Park is a multi-unit protected area in the United States territory of Guam, which was established in 1978 in honor of those who participated in the Pacific Theater of World War II. Uniquely among the National Park System, it honors the bravery and sacrifices of all those who participated in the Pacific Theater.

During World War II, Guam was captured by the Japanese forces in 1941, occupied for four years, and liberated by the Americans in 1944. The park includes former battlefields, gun emplacements, trenches, caves, and historic structures.

The Park was also featured on the Washington Quarter in 2019 as a part of the America the Beautiful Quarters Series.

== Components ==
The T. Stell Newman Visitor Center is located in Santa Rita, outside the gate of Naval Base Guam. The front of the Center displays Ha. 62-76 Japanese Midget Attack Submarine, an NRHP-listed item. The Park Headquarters itself is located in Hagåtña. Other units are largely areas significant to the American invasions on either side of the Orote Peninsula in 1944. These are:

=== Northern units ===
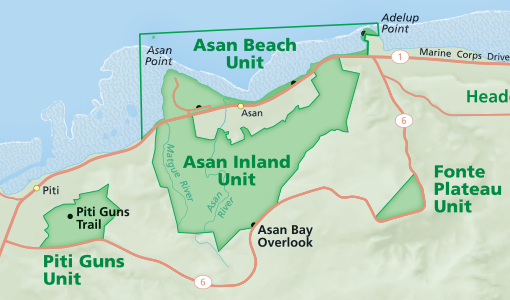
Park Units related to the north invasion beach

There are four distinct park units related to the northern invasion beach.

==== Asan Beach Unit ====
This unit comprises land, surface, and subsurface assets from Adelup Point in Hagåtña to Asan Point and the waters around the point in Asan. Asan Invasion Beach itself is an NRHP-listed asset, though there are many pillboxes, caves, and tunnels in this Unit.

The Unit also includes:

- the Liberator's Memorial, erected on the 50th anniversary of the liberation of Guam
- two monuments in honor of Apolinario Mabini and the Filipino insurrectionists of the Philippine–American War who were imprisoned at a prisoner of war camp located here in 1901.
- the Monument for the 3rd Marine Division
- the US Landing Monument

==== Asan Inland Unit ====
Including the NRHP-listed Matgue River Valley Battle Area and Asan Ridge Battle Area, this unit comprises areas of Asan-Maina and Piti extending up towards Nimitz Hill. It also includes the Asan Bay Overlook on Guam Highway 6 off Nimitz Hill Annex, which includes developed walkways, views, and sculptures. The Overlook also includes a Memorial Wall of Names for the 1,888 U.S. servicemen who died in the 1941 and 1944 battles, as well as the 1,170 people of Guam who died and the 14,721 people of Guam who suffered war atrocities.

==== Fonte Plateau Unit ====
Located in the Nimitz Hill Annex community, this Unit was the Japanese naval communications center. Following the battle, it temporarily became the Headquarters for Commander, U.S. Pacific Fleet Chester W. Nimitz.

==== Piti Guns Unit ====
The NRHP-listed Piti Guns are the centerpiece of this Unit in the hills of Piti. A trail maintained by the Park leads from Highway 6 to the three coastal guns.

=== Southern units ===
==== Agat Unit ====
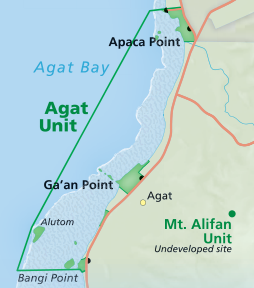
Map of the Agat and Mt. Alifan Units of the Park

The Agat Unit on the south side of the Orote Peninsula comprises land, surface, and subsurface assets in Agat Bay and the villages of Agat, Guam and Santa Rita. It extends from Apaca Point south to Bangi Point, including Alutom Island. A park at Ga'an Point includes several defensive structures and two types of guns. NRHP-listed resources here include:

- Agat Invasion Beach
- Agat World War II Amtrac, located offshore
- Hill 40, just inland of Bangi Point

==== Mt. Alifan Unit ====
The undeveloped Mount Alifan Unit was the high point used by the Japanese commander directing the defense of the Agat beaches.
