= Bani Hasan =

Bani Hasan or alternative spellings (Arabic: بني حسن) may refer to:

- Bani Hasan, Libya, a town in western Libya
- Beni Hasan, a town in Middle Egypt
- Beni Hasan, or Bani Hasan, an Ancient Egyptian cemetery site between Asyut and Memphis
- Beni Ḥassān, a nomadic group of Arabian origin

== See also ==
- Hassan (disambiguation)
- Mansheyat Bani Hasan, a Jordanian sports club
- Qarawat Bani Hassan, a Palestinian town
- Hasanids
