= Matgue River Valley Battle Area =

- U.S. National Register of Historic Places
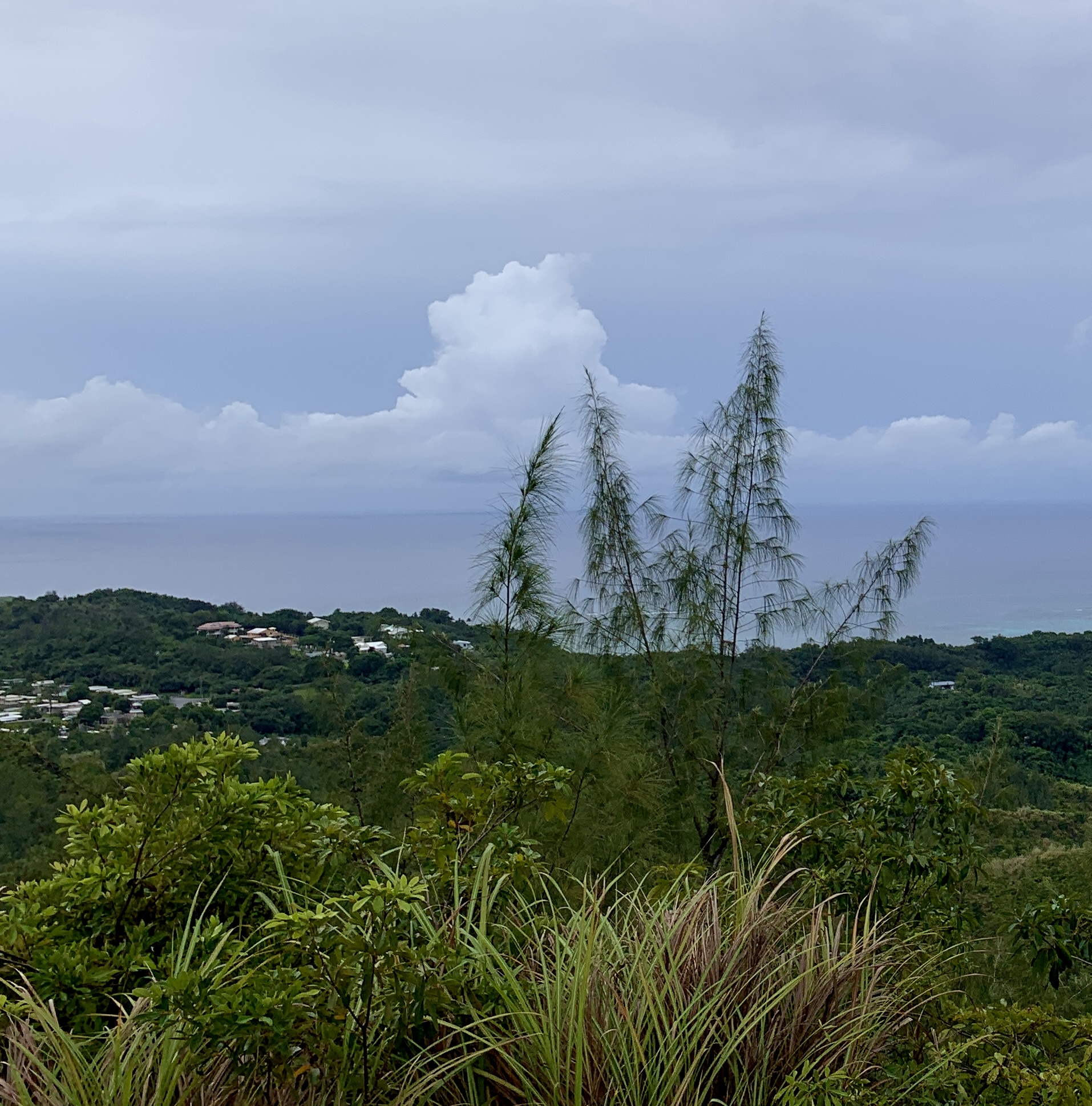

- Location within Guam
- Location: 0.6 mi. SW of Asan off Guam Highway 1, Asan-Maina, Guam
- Coordinates: 13°27′54″N 144°42′17″E
- Area: 55 acres (22 ha)
- Built: 1944
- NRHP reference No.: 75001917
- Added to NRHP: April 3, 1975

The Matgue River Valley Battle Area was the site of a decisive Allied victory during the 1944 Battle of Guam. The area was the scene of a major counterattack by Japanese forces against the Allied beachhead, in which the Japanese suffered extremely heavy casualties and were beaten back. After this attack, the remaining Japanese forces on the island retreated to the north. The area is located in the hills southwest of Asan Point along the Matgue River. The only surviving structural remnants associated with the battle are caves dug by the Japanese as defensive positions prior to the invasion.

The site was listed on the National Register of Historic Places in 1975.

== See also ==
- National Register of Historic Places listings in Guam
