= Piti Guns =

- Piti Coastal Defense Guns
- U.S. National Register of Historic Places
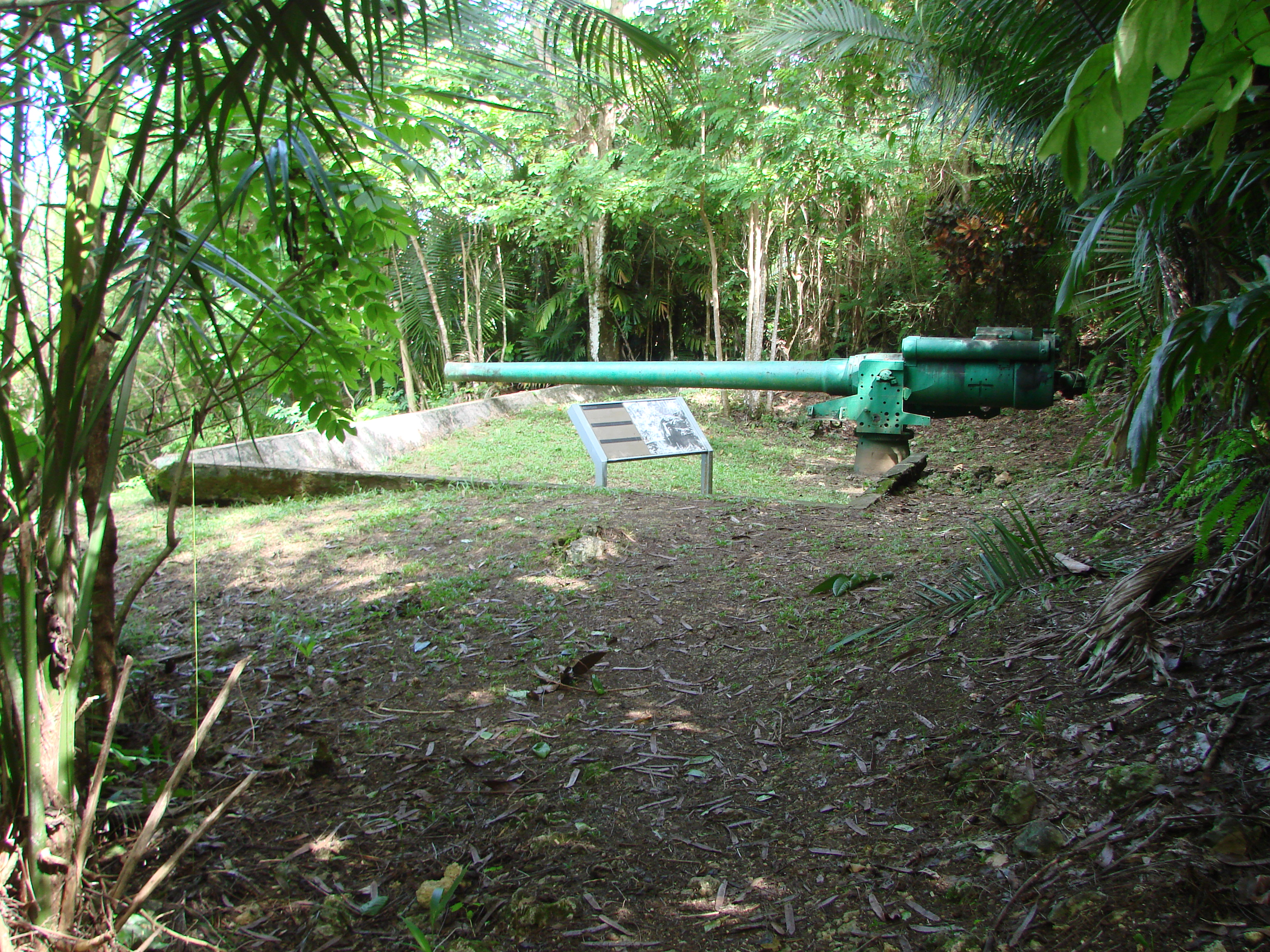
- One of three Vickers type Model 3 140mm coastal defense guns emplaced at Piti, Guam in 1944 by the Japanese in defense of Guam.

- Location within Guam
- Location: near the intersection of routes 1 and 11
- Nearest city: Piti, Guam
- Coordinates: 13°27′43″N 144°41′40″E
- Built: 1944
- NRHP reference No.: 75001909
- Added to NRHP: June 18, 1975

The Piti Guns or Piti Coastal Defense Guns is the site of three Vickers-type Model 3 140-millimetre (5.5 in) coastal defense guns in the War in the Pacific National Historical Park in Piti, Guam. The Japanese manufactured these Model 3 coastal defense guns in 1914. During the Japanese Occupation of Guam from 1941 to 1944, they built up defensive positions on the island. The Chamorro population was forced to work in building up these defenses, and did so here at the Piti Guns.

The Piti guns were strategically placed in a village consisting mostly of rice paddies in 1944. This area was chosen to defend the beach at Asan from a possible invasion. These guns have a firing range of close to 10 miles (16 km) and were intended for use against ships and landing craft. When the United States Armed Forces came to retake the island on July 21, 1944, these guns were not fully operational. Consequently, not one of the three coastal defense guns was ever fired. However, these guns are representative of the type of weapons used by the Japanese on Guam for fortification efforts.

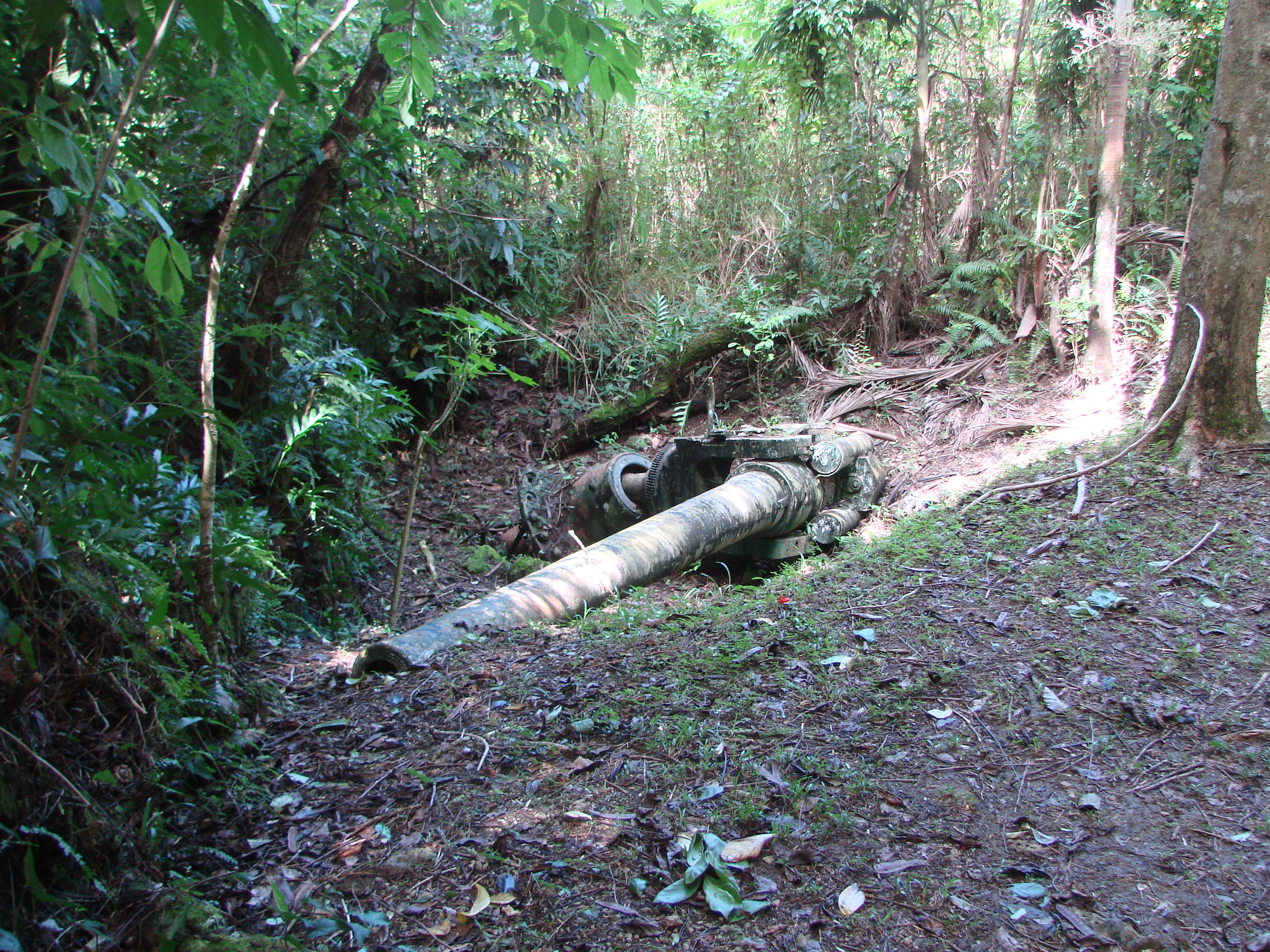
One gun was toppled by a falling tree after the war.

== Visiting ==
The Piti Guns are located in the War in the Pacific National Historical Park in Piti, Guam, and are freely accessible by the general public. The trailhead is located at 13.4621N, 144.6942E in a residential neighborhood behind a church social hall on Father Mel Street in Piti, Guam. The guns are located a short walk up a staircase from the trailhead.
