= Fort Santa Agueda =

- U.S. National Register of Historic Places
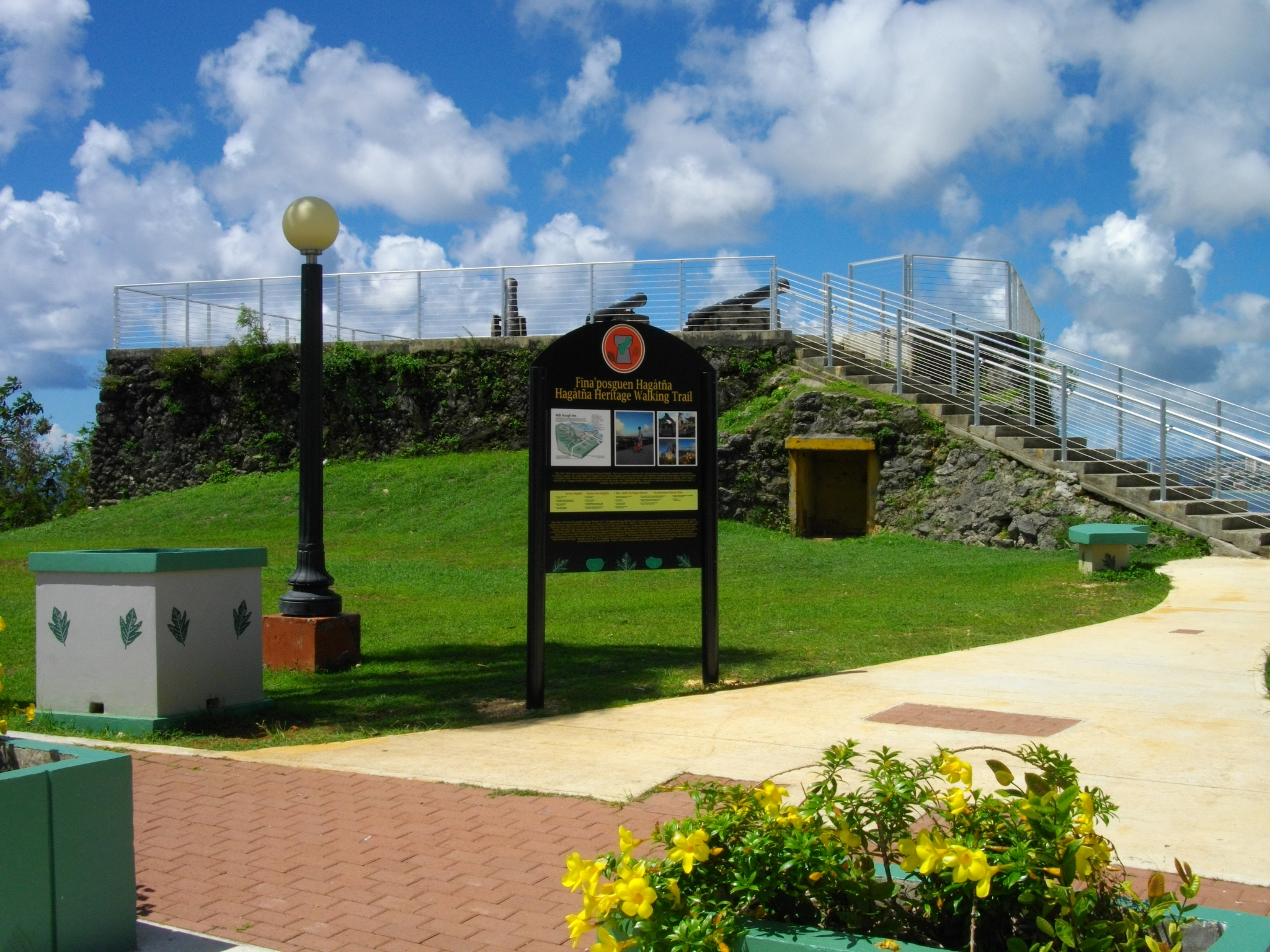
- Fort Santa Agueda

- Location within Guam
- Location: Guam Highway 7, Hagåtña (Agana), Guam
- Coordinates: 13°28′25″N 144°44′52″E
- Area: 1 acre (0.40 ha)
- Built: c.1800
- NRHP reference No.: 74002301
- Added to NRHP: August 30, 1974

Fort Santa Agueda, on Guam Highway 7 in Hagåtña (formerly Agana), Guam, dates from about 1800, during the 1784-1802 administration of Spanish governor Manuel Moro. It was an uncovered fort with a manposteria (coral stone and lime mortar) parapet, rising about 10 feet (3.0 m) above a sloping hillside. It is listed on the U.S. National Register of Historic Places, as the only remaining fortification of the Spanish Era in Hagåtña.

The fort was mentioned in 1802 by an officer of an American whaling ship, who recorded that the fort had seven guns and ten men, and that it fired a salute when the governor entered a new church in Agana. Russian Otto von Kotzebue, in 1817, noted that it had only a few guns. It was in ruins by 1887. It was used by Americans as a signal station until 1933, and was converted to a gun emplacement by the Japanese occupiers during World War II.

It became a park in 1960 and was listed on the National Register of Historic Places in 1974.

== See also ==
- National Register of Historic Places listings in Guam
