= Fonte River Dam =

Dam in Guam

- U.S. National Register of Historic Places
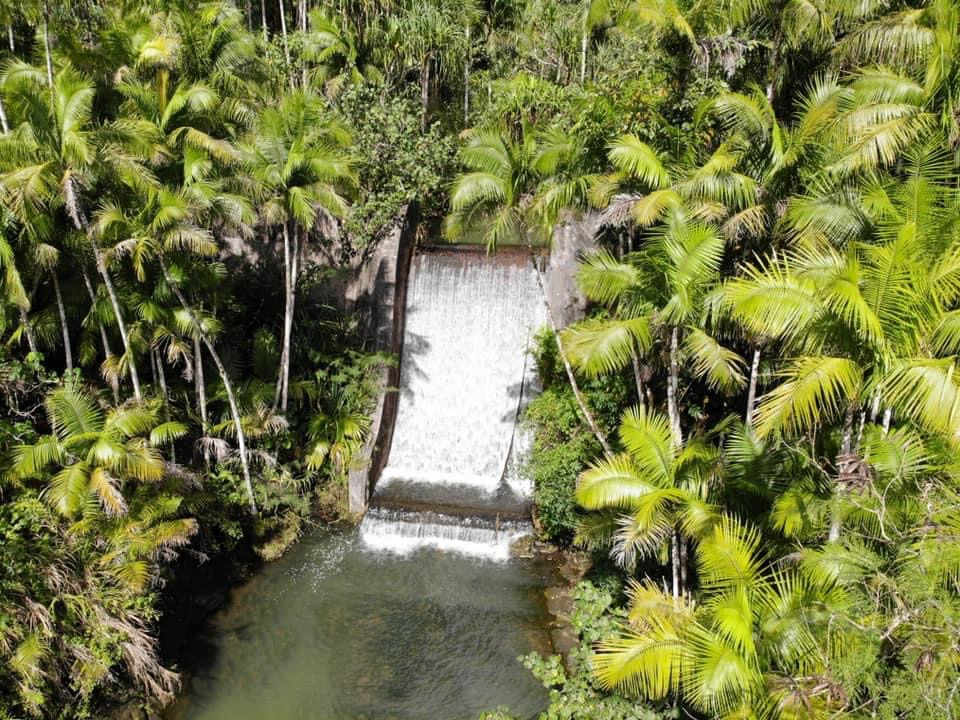
- Drone image of Fonte Dam.

- Location within Guam
- Location: Fonte River, immediately southwest of Nimitz Hill Overlook Park, near Libugon, Guam
- Coordinates: 13°27′31″N 144°43′43″E
- Area: less than one acre
- Built: 1910
- Architectural style: 20th century dam and irrigation
- NRHP reference No.: 14000035
- Added to NRHP: February 25, 2014

The Fonte River Dam is a historic dam on the Fonte River on the island of Guam. It is located in the upper third of the river's main valley, which is located between Nimitz Hill Annex and Agana Heights, and lies below and west of the Libugon scenic overlook on Nimitz Hill. The dam, built in 1910, was part of the first organized effort by the United States Navy to provide a reliable water supply to the island's major settlement, Hagåtña (formerly Agana). It is a concrete structure 150 feet (46 m) long, 24 feet (7.3 m) high, and has a 17 feet (5.2 m) base. It is almost completely obscured by jungle overgrowth.

The dam was listed on the National Register of Historic Places in 2014.

== See also ==
- National Register of Historic Places in Guam
