= Nimitz Hill Annex, Guam =

Nimitz Hill Annex
- census-designated place
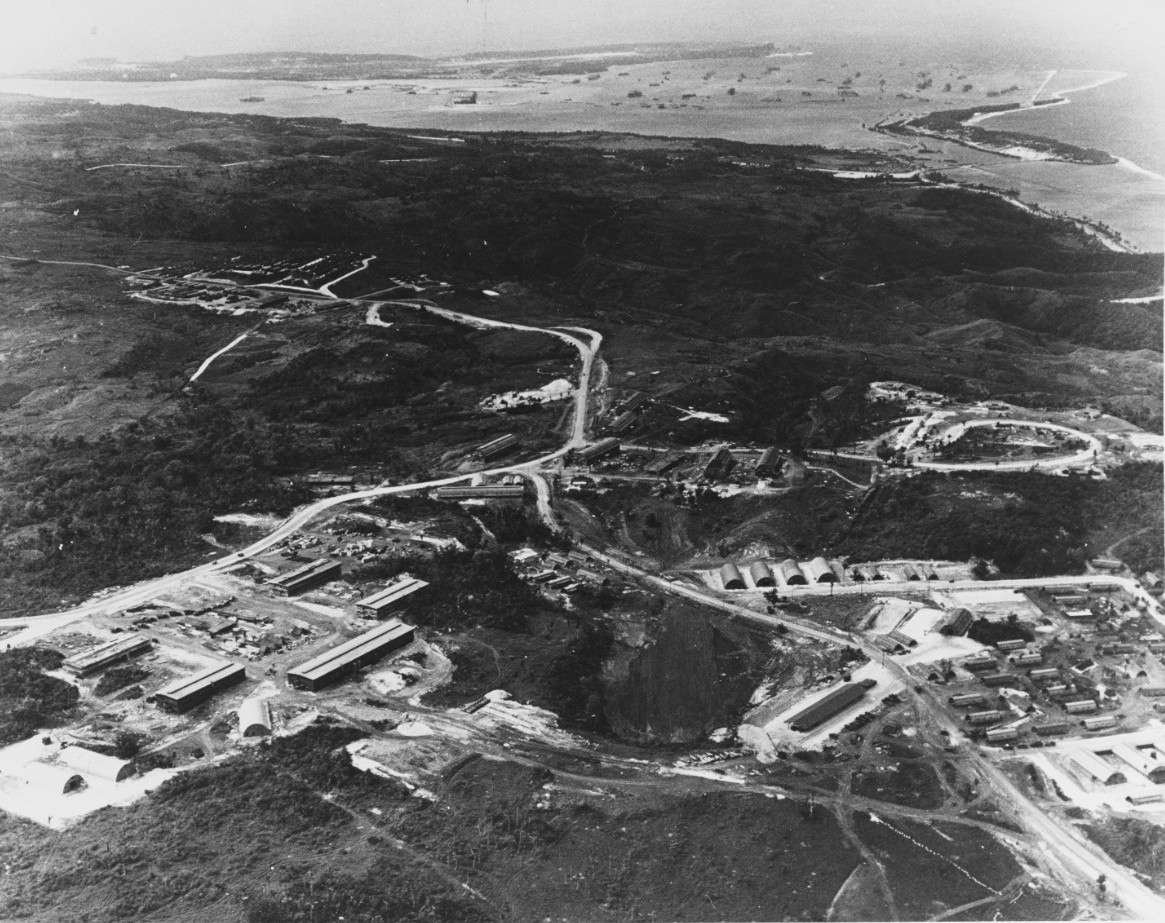
- Fleet Admiral Chester W. Nimitz's CinCPac-POA headquarters being built in January 1945
- CDP map
- Nimitz Hill Annex on Guam
- Coordinates: 13.4637°N 144.7237°E
- Country: United States
- Territory: Guam
- Village: Asan-Maina

Population (2010)
  - Total: 180

Nimitz Hill Annex is a community and census-designated place (CDP) in Asan-Maina, Guam. It contains the geographic feature of Nimitz Hill, and is located immediately northeast of the Nimitz Hill CDP in Piti. In normal conversation, the Nimitz Hill CDP and Nimitz Hill Annex CDP are often collectively referred to as "Nimitz Hill."

== Geography ==
Nimitz Hill Annex is located in the hills above the Asan shoreline, in particular the 1944 Liberation of Guam's Asan Invasion Beach. It is located largely along Guam Highway 6, known as Halsey Drive as it passes through the CDP. It is bounded to the north by the Asan Inland Unit of War in the Pacific National Historical Park, to the northeast by Asan's Maina community in the Fonte River valley, to the west by the adjacent Nimitz Hill CDP across the village boundary in Piti, and to the south by the Fonte River and uninhabited inland highlands.

The Annex includes a military reservation, also named Nimitz Hill, with housing for senior U.S. military officers on Guam. The headquarters building for Joint Region Marianas / Naval Forces Marianas and the NAVFAC Marianas building are nearby, close to the actual peak of Nimitz Hill.

The Fonte Plateau Unit of War in the Pacific National Historical Park is located in the southeast of the community. The Asan Bay Overlook of the Park's Asan Inland Unit, with its memorials, is accessed through Nimitz Hill Annex. The Libugon Viewpoint, near the eastern boundary of the CDP, offers views over Maina and Agana Heights to Agana Bay. The NRHP-listed Fonte River Dam, often used as a water recreation area, is located in the southeast of Nimitz Hill Annex.

The transmitter for NOAA Weather Radio station WXM85, programmed by NWS Tiyan, is located here.

== History ==
Commander, U.S. Pacific Fleet Chester W. Nimitz briefly made his headquarters at the Japanese naval communications center at Fonte Plateau in January 1945.

The Fleet Weather Center/Joint Typhoon Warning Center was established at Nimitz Hill in 1959. On 11 November 1962 Typhoon Karen destroyed the Quonset hut that housed the Center. It was moved to a temporary location until 1965 when a new typhoon-resistant annex to the COMNAVMAR (Commander Naval Forces Marianas) Headquarters building was opened. On January 1, 1999, the Center was moved to Pearl Harbor following the Base Realignment and Closure legislation of 1995. Nimitz Hill is also home to former United States Naval family housing.

On August 6, 1997 Korean Air Flight 801 crashed immediately south of the Nimitz Hill Annex area.

== Education ==
In regards to the Department of Defense Education Activity (DoDEA), Nimitz Hill is in the school transportation zone for McCool Elementary and McCool Middle School, while Guam High School is the island's sole DoDEA high school.

Non-DoDEA public schools are operated by the Guam Department of Education.
