= Asan, Firozabad =

Village in Uttar Pradesh, India

Asan
- Village
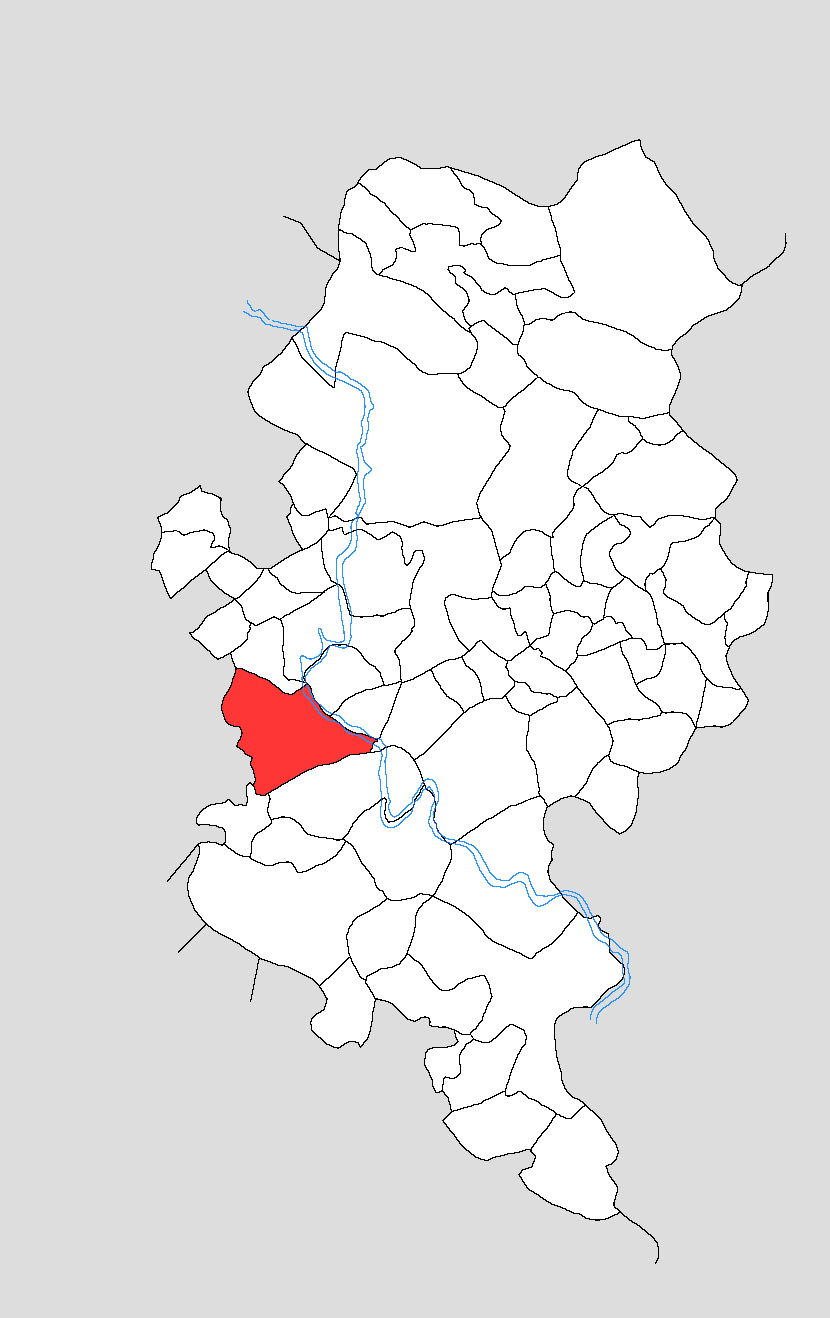
- Map showing Asan in Kotla block

- Location in Uttar Pradesh, India
- Coordinates: 27.25492°N 78.38049°E
- Country: India
- State: Uttar Pradesh
- District: Firozabad
- Tehsil: Firozabad

Area
  - Total: 1.664 km^{2} (0.642 sq mi)

Population (2011)
  - Total: 1,624
  - Density: 976.0/km^{2} (2,528/sq mi)
- Time zone: UTC+5:30 (IST)

Asan is a village in Kotla block of Firozabad district, Uttar Pradesh, India. As of 2011, it had a population of 1,624, in 252 households.

== Demographics ==
As of 2011, Asan had a population of 1,624, in 252 households. This population was 53.6% male (870) and 46.4% female (754). The 0-6 age group numbered 237 (131 male and 106 female), making up 14.6% of the total population. 301 residents were members of Scheduled Castes, or 18.5% of the total.

The 1981 census recorded Asan as having a population of 904 people (482 male and 422 female), in 142 households and 137 physical houses.

The 1961 census recorded Asan as comprising 1 hamlet, with a total population of 573 people (319 male and 254 female), in 109 households and 92 physical houses. The area of the village was given as 422 acres and it had a post office at that point.

== Infrastructure ==
As of 2011, Asan had 1 primary school and 1 maternity and child welfare centre. Drinking water was provided by hand pump and tube well/borehole; there were no public toilets. The village did not have a post office or public library; there was at least some access to electricity for all purposes. Streets were made of both kachcha and pakka materials.
