= ASAN Radio =

- Baku; Azerbaijan
- Frequency: 100 MHz
- Branding: ASAN Radio

Programming
- Format: Public service radio; Azerbaijani national music

Ownership
- Owner: State Agency for Public Service and Social Innovations

History
- First air date: 24 December 2015

ASAN Radio is a public radio station located in Baku, Azerbaijan, which broadcasts at 100 MHz. It was started with a test broadcast on 24 December 2015. The station also streams content over the Internet for free. The station currently broadcasts information about the realized projects, services and innovations served by ASAN service. The national music is dominated on air.

"ASAN Radio" is the first and only radio specialized on public services, established under the State Agency for Public Service and Social Innovations under the President of the Republic of Azerbaijan.

== See also ==
- Azad Azerbaijan TV
- Ictimai TV
