= Asan, Iran =

Asan (Persian: اسان) in Iran may refer to:

- Asan, East Azerbaijan
- Asan, Razavi Khorasan
