= Awlad Hassan =

Ethnic group in Sudan

Awlad Hassan is an ethnic group of Sudan. It is an Arabic-speaking minority and belongs to the Rizeigat. The number of persons in this group was round 114,000 in 2011. Most members of this group are Muslims.
