= Hassan Mosque =

Hassan Mosque may refer to:

- Mosque-Madrassa of Sultan Hassan in Cairo
- Hassan II Mosque in Casablanca
- The incomplete mosque in Rabat incorporating the Hassan Tower
