= Hasan, Albania =

Hasan
- Village
- Location within Albania
- Coordinates: 41°28′58″N 19°41′59″E
- Country: Albania
- County: Durrës
- Municipality: Krujë
- Administrative unit: Fushë-Krujë
- Time zone: UTC+1 (CET)
  - Summer (DST): UTC+2 (CEST)

Hasan is a village in the Durrës County, western Albania. At the 2015 local government reform it became part of the municipality Krujë.
