= Asan Khaliev =

Soviet Crimean sniper (1915–1997)

- Асан Салиджарович Халиев
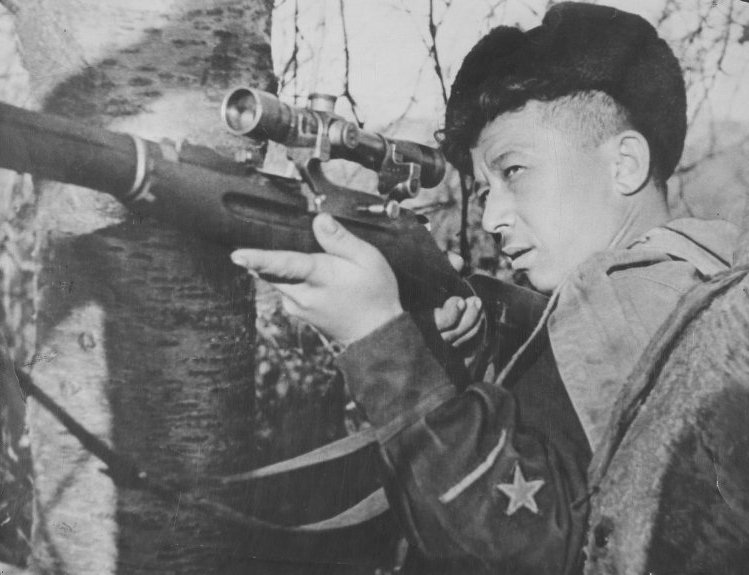
- Born: 15 January 1915; Yevpatoriya, Taurida Governorate, Russian Empire
- Died: 1 September 1997 (aged 82)
- Military career
- Allegiance: Soviet Union
- Branch: Soviet Navy
- Service years: 1941–1944
- Rank: Starshina 2nd class
- Units: 305th Separate Rifle Battalion (83rd Red Banner Separate Marine Rifle Brigade)
- Awards: Order of the Red Banner

Asan Salidzharovich Khaliev (Russian: Асан Салиджарович Халиев; (Note: The spelling of his patronymic varies greatly among his award sheets, with variations including Салиджанович, Салижарович, Силибжанович, Силибанович and Селибжанович. Some of the differences in spelling are likely the result of the keys "н" (n) and "р" (r) being next to each other on Russian keyboards.) 15 January 1915 – 1 September 1997) was a prolific sniper in the Soviet Marines who personally killed at least 242 Nazis. He was nominated for the title Hero of the Soviet Union, but received the Order of the Red Banner instead.

== Biography ==
Khaliev was born on 15 January 1915 to a Crimean Tatar family in Yevpatoriya. He was drafted into the Red Army in 1941 by the Evpatoria city military registration and enlistment office of the Crimean ASSR. From the first days of the war, he was fighting on the frontlines against the Nazi invasion of the Soviet Union as a soldier in the 83rd Red Banner Separate Marine Rifle Brigade. He took part in the defense of Sevastapol, where he opened his sniper account. He took part in the battles for the Caucasus, fighting in the areas near Yerevan, Shapsugskaya, and at the height 614.4 in the village of Sadovoye, where he reached 210 kills of Nazis as a sniper. He then gained another 32 kills of Nazi soldiers during the Novorossiysk, bringing up his tally to 242 kills. During the battle for Malaya Zemlya, he led his platoon into attacking a group of Nazi submachine gunners that infliltrated behind Soviet lines after his platoon commander failed in stopping the attack; he was wounded in that battle.

He also helped other soldiers learn his sniper craft, training 15 other snipers. A photo of him posing with his sniper rifle taken during the Battle of Kuban was published in the Photonewspaper of the Soviet Navy in issue 9 of 1943.

His superiors concluded that he was worthy of the title Hero of the Soviet Union and nominated him for the title on 26 June 1943; the nomination was first signed off by his commanding officer Aleksey Abramov, then general Nikolai Shvarev. The nomination was then supported and signed off on by generals Konstantin Leselidze and Semyon Kolonin. However, generals Ivan Petrov and Yevgeny Fominykh did not sign it. Because the other generals failed to sign the award, the nomination was sent to the North Caucasus Front which awarded him the Order of the Red Banner. (Note: Only by decree of the Supreme Soviet could someone be awarded the title Hero of the Soviet Union.)

His final kill count is unknown. Because of how he badly wounded on 24 April 1943, he had to be hospitalized for a long time away from the front, and was eventually demobilized in December 1944. He died on 1 September 1997.

== Awards ==
- Order of the Red Banner (10 July 1943)
- Order of the Patriotic War 1st class (1985) (Note: On 11 March 1985, the Supreme Soviet decreed that all living frontline veterans would be awarded the Order of the Patriotic war 1st class. The awards were given out to individuals later, in the case of Khaliev, it was awarded to him on 5 November 1985.)
- Order of the Red Star (30 March 1943)
- Medal "For the Defence of the Caucasus" (11 June 1946)
- Medal "For the Defence of Sevastopol" (25 July 1943)
- Medal "For the Defence of Odessa" (25 August 1943)
- Medal "For the Victory over Germany in the Great Patriotic War 1941–1945" (2 September 1945)
