= Japanese occupation of Guam =

1941–1944 occupation of Guam by Empire of Japan

Great Shrine Island: 大宮島; Ōmiya-Jima
- 1941–1944
- Flag Imperial Seal
- Status: Military occupation based on Colonial Government by the Empire of Japan
- Common languages: Japanese (official); Chamorro; English; German; Spanish
- Historical era: World War II
  - First Battle of Guam: 10 December 1941
  - Ruled by Imperial Japanese Navy: March 1942
  - American troops land on Orote Peninsula, Second Battle of Guam begins: 21 July 1944
  - Occupation ends: 10 August 1944
Preceded by	Succeeded by
Naval Government of Guam	Naval Government of Guam
- Today part of: Guam

The Japanese occupation of Guam was the period in the history of Guam between 1941 and 1944 when Imperial Japanese forces occupied Guam during World War II. The island was renamed Ōmiya-Jima ('Great Shrine Island').

== Events leading to the occupation ==
The Battle of Guam in 1941 was an engagement during the Pacific War in World War II that took place on December 8, 1941, on Guam in the Mariana Islands between the Japanese and Allied forces. During the battle, the USS Penguin (AM-33) was scuttled after shooting down a Japanese plane. Naval Governor of Guam George McMillin surrendered to the Japanese forces around 7:00 a.m. on December 10, 1941, ceding control of the island.

== Life during the occupation ==
During the occupation period, Chamorros were forced to endure the hardships of the military occupation. For the first four months, the island was controlled by army troops, who were housed in schools and government buildings in Agana. Specifically, Naval Captain Hiromi Hayashi, a commander of the 5th Company of the 2nd Maizuru Special Naval Landing Force which formed part of the Japanese invasion force, alongside the army's South Seas Detachment in December, made Agana's former governor's palace the headquarters for the kenpeitai.

Japan intended to maintain Guam as a permanent territory beyond the war and thus invested resources, by way of teachers and education supplies, to launch the campaign of their Japanization policy. The goal was to bring the indigenous Chamorro people into the Japanese nation through total assimilation of Japanese culture and ideology. The task was at first thought to be a swift and easy one, as the population of Guam was small; however, these Japanization efforts later faced difficulty, supposedly due to the Americanization of the Chamorros during the prior 40 years under US control. Chamorros were required to learn the Japanese custom of bowing, the Japanese yen became the island's currency, and civilian affairs were handled by a branch of the army called the Minseibu. Cars, radios, and cameras were confiscated, and food was rationed until supplies became exhausted.

Control of the island came under the Imperial Japanese Navy in March 1942. The keibitai, as it was known, governed the populace for about 19 months. Chamorros were allowed to remain on their farms and trade for products they needed. Social activities, including parties, Japanese movies, and sports competitions, were allowed. Mass meetings were held in Agana to reinforce the "Nippon Seishin" (spirit of Japan). Schools were reopened, and Chamorros were required to learn the Japanese language and customs, with English being forbidden. Adults and children were taught reading, writing, math, and Japanese games and songs.

Before the Japanese occupation, Guam's economy was semi-self-sufficient through the exportation of copra. However, the economy was deeply impacted by the war and the Japanese occupation caused further damage by setting a low exchange rate of US dollars to the Japanese yen. There was also an unreasonable seizure of the assets, destruction of homes, and shortage of food and other necessities for the locals. Chamorros' labor was also exploited through Japanese-led land development and fortifications. The Japanese military also occupied land that was essential to the agriculture and economy of Guam.

== Events leading to end of the occupation ==
By early 1944, Japan's war efforts were failing. With an American invasion threatening, the Japanese Army returned to Guam, bringing with it a new, stricter form of government, the kaikontai. Social activities were terminated, schools were closed, and Chamorro men, women, and children over the age of 12 were forced to work long hours in the fields, repair or build airstrips and defense installations, and dig hundreds of Japanese cave shelters, many of which are within the boundaries of War in the Pacific National Historical Park on Guam. Chamorros, laboring at bayonet point, were mistreated and, in some cases, executed after completing defense installations. Without warning, 10,000–15,000 Chamorros of all ages were forced to march, with only the belongings they could carry to camps in Guam's central and southern jungles. With inadequate shelter, minimal food, and no sanitary facilities, life in these camps was miserable. Despite hardships, however, incarceration proved to be a blessing in disguise for those who survived the camps, as had they not been moved, many Chamorros would have been killed by the American bombs and Japanese crossfire.

=== End of the occupation ===
On 21 July, the Americans landed on both sides of the Orote Peninsula. On the western side of Guam, the Americans endeavored to cut off the airfield. The 3rd Marine Division landed near Agana to the north of Orote at 08:28, and the 1st Provisional Marine Brigade landed near Agat to the south. Japanese artillery sank 20 LVTs, but by 09:00 tanks were ashore at both beaches. The 77th Infantry Division had a more difficult landing. Lacking amphibious vehicles, they had to wade ashore from the edge of the reef where they were dropped by their landing craft.

By nightfall, the Americans had established beachheads about 2,000 meters (6,600 ft) deep. Japanese counterattacks were made throughout the first few days of the battle, mostly at night, using infiltration tactics. Several times they penetrated the American defenses and were driven back with heavy loss of men and equipment. Lieutenant General Takeshi Takashina was killed on 28 July, and Lieutenant General Hideyoshi Obata took over the command of the defenders.

Supply was very difficult for the Americans in the first days of the battle. Landing ships could not come closer than the reef, several hundred meters from the beach, and amphibious vehicles were scarce. However, the two beachheads were joined up on 28 July, and the Orote airfield and Apra Harbor were captured by 30 July.

The counterattacks around the American beachheads had exhausted the Japanese. At the start of August they were running out of food and ammunition and had only a handful of tanks left. Obata withdrew his troops from the south of Guam, planning to make a stand in the mountainous central part of the island. But with resupply and reinforcement impossible because of American control of the sea and air around Guam, he could hope to do no more than delay the inevitable defeat for a few days.

Rain and thick jungle made conditions difficult for the Americans, but after an engagement at Mount Barrigada from 2 to 4 August, the Japanese line collapsed and the rest of the battle was a pursuit to the north. As in other battles of the Pacific War, the Japanese refused to surrender, and almost all were killed.

On 10 August 1944, the American forces succeeded in wiping out the Japanese occupiers ending the occupation, although a small number of Japanese Holdouts would remain in hiding in caves throughout the island, the last being found in 1972.

== Life after occupation ==
As a result of the end of the Japanese occupation, Guam celebrates with a yearly Liberation Day on 21 July. The island also holds a procession on 8 December; this also commemorates the day of the Japanese attack. On this day, people gather in Hagåtña and watch parades and have carnivals. The results of the Japanese military occupation led to strong anti-Japanese views from the Chamorros that continued until late 1960s. A majority of the hostility was directed at the Japanese residents in Guam. Many were expelled to either Japan or Saipan and some were even tried in court. The impacts of the war are still seen today, through the unpaid war reparation claims. Due to the Treaty of Peace with Japan, Guam is unable to ask Japan to pay the war claims, instead seeking reparations from the US.

Since June 2006, the US Congress, the House Judiciary Committee, and the Department of Justice have worked together to approve a bill for Chamorro war reparations. Within the Department of Justice's Foreign Claims Settlement Commission, the Guam Claims Program is still actively looking at cases and providing compensations for Guam victims.

== Monuments and historical markers in Guam relating to the occupation ==
- War in the Pacific National Historical Park near to Asan, Guam
- Plaza de Espana - Hagatna, Guam
- Caves and Jails in Tutuhan Park - Hagatna, Guam

== See also ==
- Japanese holdout
