= Hasanovići =

Village in Bosnia and Herzegovina

Hasanovići Хасановићи
- Village
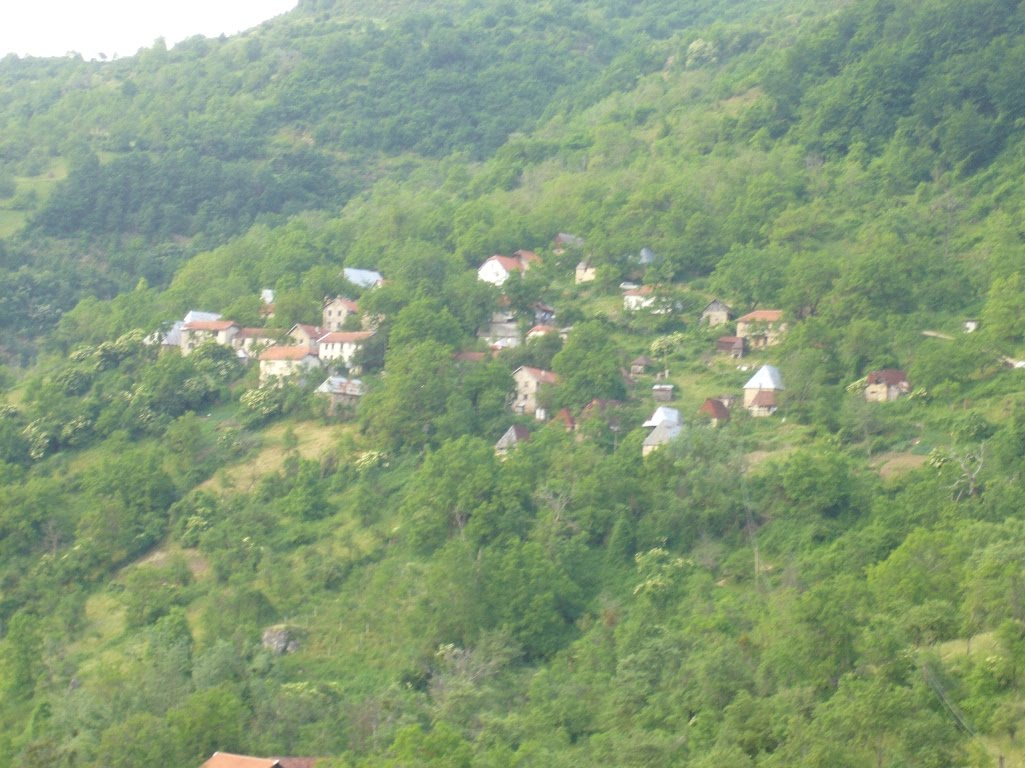

- Location within Bosnia and Herzegovina
- Coordinates: 43°43′44″N 17°56′27″E
- Country: Bosnia and Herzegovina
- Entity: Federation of Bosnia and Herzegovina
- Canton: Herzegovina-Neretva
- Municipality: Konjic

Area
  - Total: 1.92 sq mi (4.97 km^{2})

Population (2013)
  - Total: 31
  - Density: 16/sq mi (6.2/km^{2})
- Time zone: UTC+1 (CET)
  - Summer (DST): UTC+2 (CEST)

Hasanovići (Cyrillic: Хасановићи) is a village in the municipality of Konjic, Bosnia and Herzegovina.

== Demographics ==
According to the 2013 census, its population was 31.

Ethnicity in 2013
Ethnicity	Number	Percentage
Bosniaks	28	90.3%
other/undeclared	3	9.7%
Total	31	100%
