= Asan Kasingye =

Uganda police officer (born 1964)

AIGP Asan Kasingye
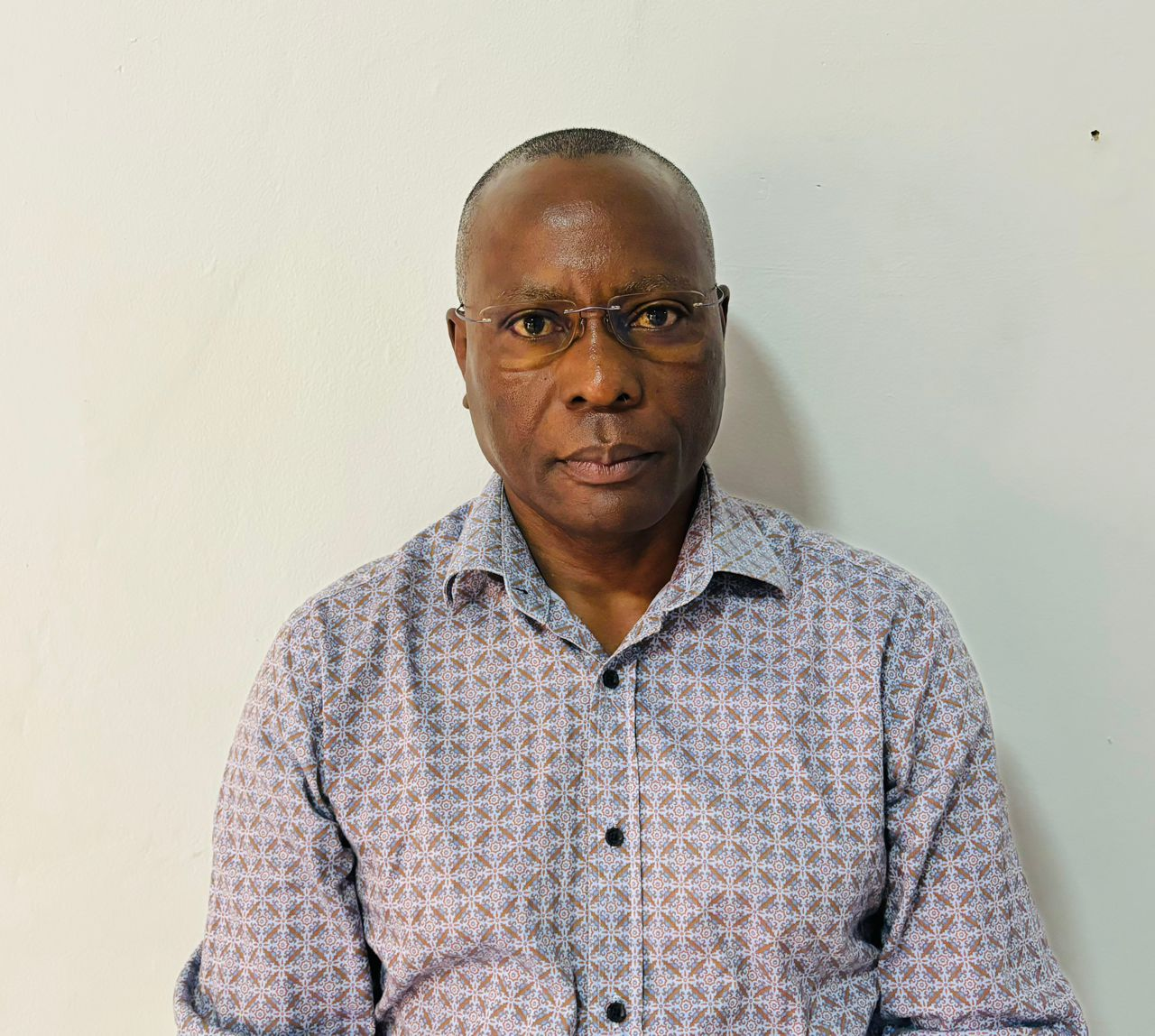
- Born: March 23, 1964 (age 62); Sheema District, Uganda
- Occupation: Police officer
- Known for: SC Villa Spokesperson, PUoT (President of Ugandans on twitter)
- Website: https://tayarisecurity.ug/

Asan Kasingye is a former Uganda Police Force officer at a Rank of Assistant Inspector General of Police. He was serving as the force's Political Commissar, is a former police spokesperson and Interpol boss and currently is the SC Villa spokesperson and also the Managing Director to Tayari Security Company.

== Early life and education ==
Asan Kasingye was born on March 23, 1964, to Robinah and John Kairukabi of Kibingo Hill village, Sheema district. He attended Kibingo Primary School, St. Kaggwa Bushenyi High School after that joined Makerere University for a bachelor's degree in economics and political science. Kasingye joined the Uganda Police Force in 1986 and has been serving to date.

== Career ==
Kasingye has been a serving police officer in the Uganda police for the last 34 years. He has served in different offices from Interpol boss to police spokesperson and now political commissar. In January 2020, Kasingye and 11 other police chiefs faced a lot of criticism from members of the public when it was revealed that they were occupying their offices illegally. President Museveni would later renew his contract. Kasingye is also serving as Chairman Uganda Police Football Club. He also became one of the public servants that tested positive for COVID-19. Kasingye publicly announced on Twitter that he had tested positive for COVID-19. Kasingye is also a Twitter enthusiast and serves as the President for Ugandans on Twitter. There has been controversy about his Twitter handle being personal or an official one.

== See also ==
- Martin Okoth Ochola
