= Bani Hasan, Libya =

Bani Hasan
- Town
- Location in Libya
- Coordinates: 32°41′03″N 14°08′03″E
- Country: Libya
- Region: Tripolitania
- District: Murqub
- Time zone: UTC+2 (EET)

Bani Hasan is a town in western Libya lying on the coast of the Mediterranean Sea.

== Transport ==
It is proposed to be served by a station on the national railway network, under construction in 2009.

== See also ==
- Railway stations in Libya
