= Kochukrishnan Asan =

Indian astronomer (1756–1812)

Koccukṛṣṇan Āśān (Kṛṣṇadāsa) (1756 – 1812) was an astronomer/astrologer from Kerala, India. He was born in the Neṭuṃpayil family in Thiruvalla in Kerala as the son of an erudite astrologer Rāman Āśān. Kṛṣṇadāsa studied astronomy and astrology initially under his father and later from his teacher Śūlapāṇi Vāriyar of Kozhikode. His works on astronomy and astrology were all written in the local language Malayalam and they were all addressed to the novice. One of them is of special interest. It is a commentary on Āryabhaṭīya in Malayalam prose. Apart from the fact that the work is in prose, it is also important because it quotes several authorities including Bhāāskara I, Saṅgamagrāma Mādhava and Vaṭaśreṇi Parameśvara. The other works include:

1. Pañcabodha
2. Bhāṣājātakapaddhati (a free rendering-cum-commentary of the Jātakapaddhati of Vaṭaśreṇi Parameśvara incorporating several topics not dealt with in the original
3. Kaṇkkuśāstraṃ
4. Bhāṣāgolayukti
