= Hassan (crater) =

Crater on Enceladus

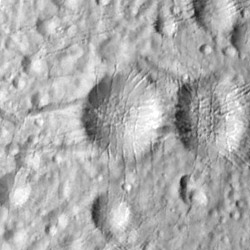
- Hassan (center) as seen by the Cassini spacecraft on July 14, 2005
- Location: 31.31°S 188.47°W
- Diameter: 14.5 km
- Discoverer: Cassini
- Naming: Hassan; merchant

Hassan is an impact crater on the southern hemisphere of Saturn's moon Enceladus. Hassan was first observed in Cassini images during that mission's March 2005 flyby of Enceladus. It is located at 31.3° South Latitude, 188.5° West Longitude, and is 14.5 kilometers across. Numerous criss-crossing fractures cut across Hassan, breaking up the regolith on the crater floor.

Hassan is named after the main character from the tale "Hassan of Bassorah" from The Book of One Thousand and One Nights.
