= Asan Circuit =

Motor racing circuit in Miyoshi, Tokushima, Japan

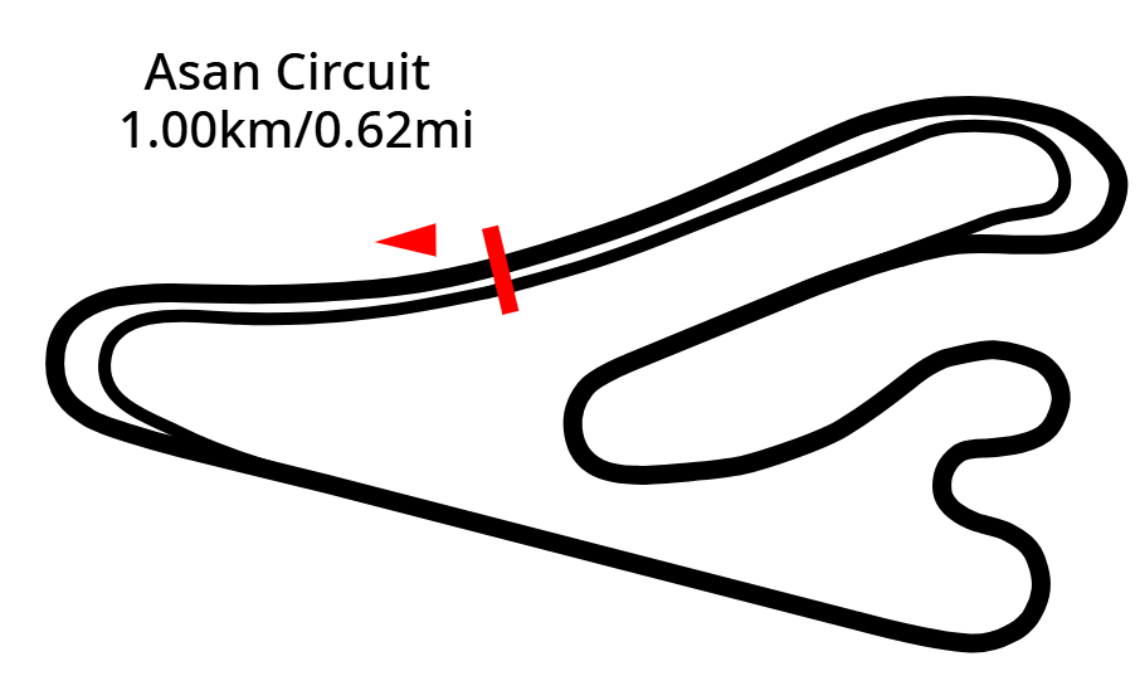
- Full Circuit (1987–present)
- Location: Miyoshi District, Tokushima, Tokushima Prefecture, Shikoku, West Japan
- Coordinates: 34°5′21″N 133°51′30″E
- Opened: 1987

Full Circuit (1987–present)
- Length: 1.004 km (0.624 mi)
- Turns: 9

Asan Circuit is a 1.004 km (0.624 mi) motor racing circuit in Miyoshi District, Tokushima city, Tokushima Prefecture, on the island of Shikoku, Japan.
