= Nimitz Hill (geographic feature) =

Hill in Asan-Maina, Guam

Coordinates: 13.4632°N 144.73034°E

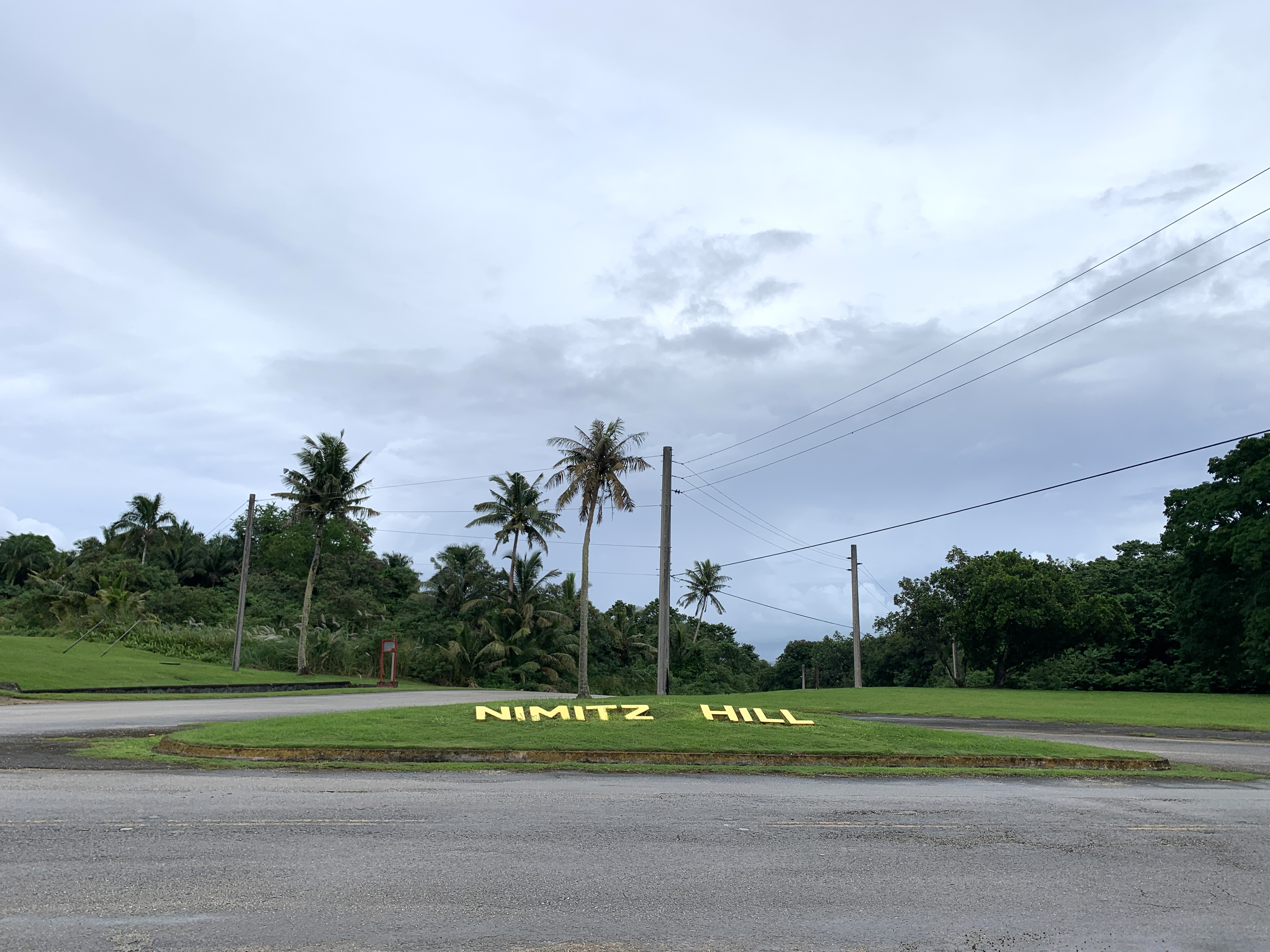
Nimitz Hill

Nimitz Hill is a hill in Asan-Maina, Guam. It lies within the Nimitz Hill Annex CDP (census-designated place). The US Navy headquarters for Guam (Joint Region Marianas and Commander Naval Forces Marianas) lie near the crest of the hill. The hill is named after American admiral Chester W. Nimitz who was Commander in Chief of the Pacific Ocean Areas during World War II with his headquarters in Guam.

The hill is capped with limestone belonging to the Alifan limestone formation (Miocene). The limestone is up to 150 feet thick with the base of the bed between 300 and 600 feet altitude. There is a limestone quarry on the hill. There are many caves on Nimitz Hill, some of them large, formed through fractures and sinkholes.

On 6 August 1997 Korean Air Flight 801 crashed south of Nimitz Hill killing 228 people out of the 254 on board. The crash was blamed on pilot error exacerbated by the FAA switching off the MSAW within 54 nm of landing. While the crash was nearly on the top of the NIMITZ VOR navigation beacon, the NIMITZ VOR is located on Bijia Peak, separated from Nimitz Hill by the Fonte River valley. However, Nimitz Hill Annex was the closest community to the crash site.
