= Fonte River =

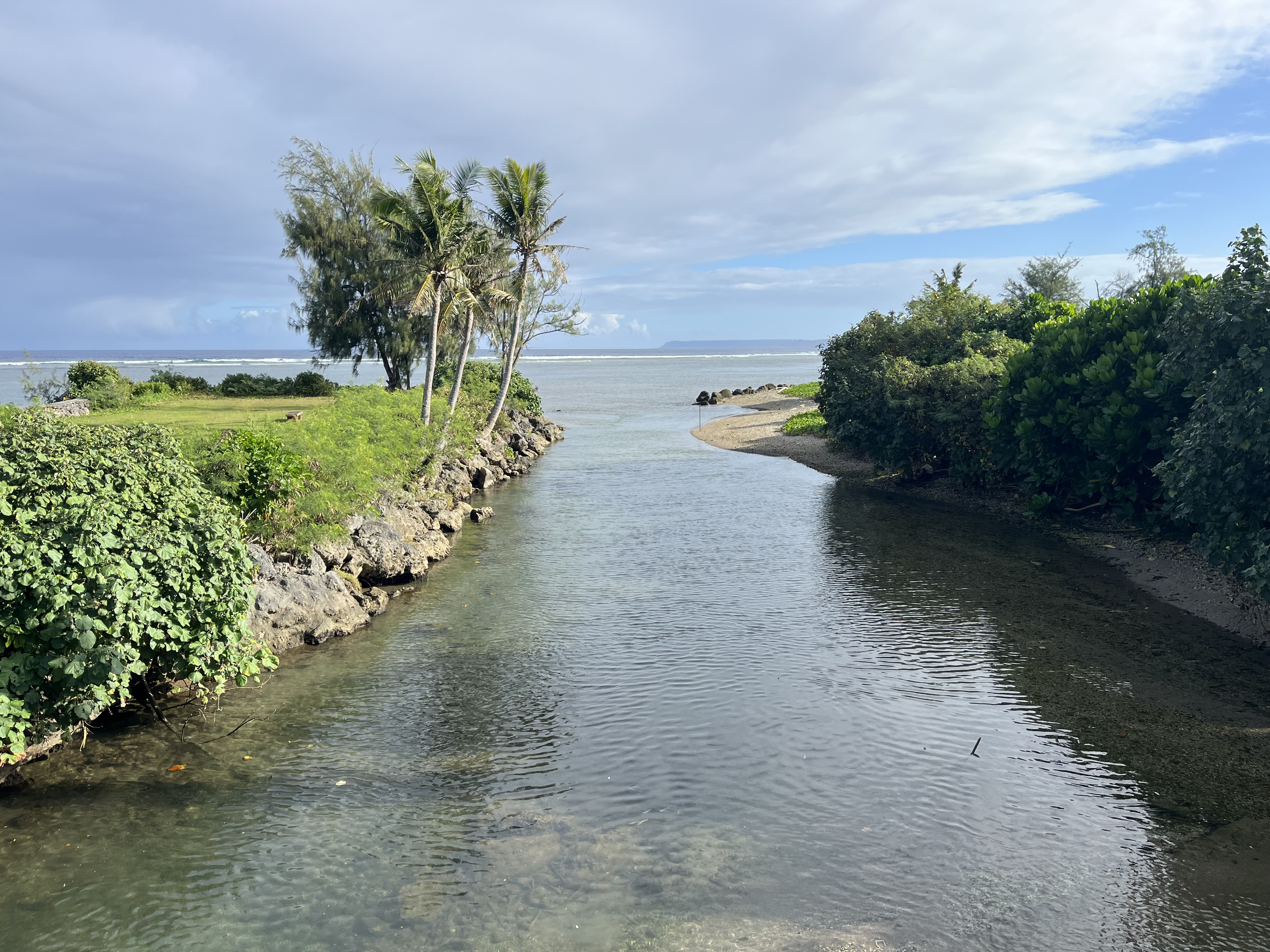
- The Fonte River emptying into the Philippine Sea at Aniguak, beside Adelup Point.

Location
- Country: Guam

Physical characteristics
- Mouth
  - coordinates: 13.4775000°N 144.7291667°E

The Fonte River is a river in the United States territory of Guam. The NRHP-listed Fonte River Dam is located in its upper reaches, south of Nimitz Hill Annex.

== See also ==
- List of rivers of Guam
