= Asan Invasion Beach =

- U.S. National Register of Historic Places
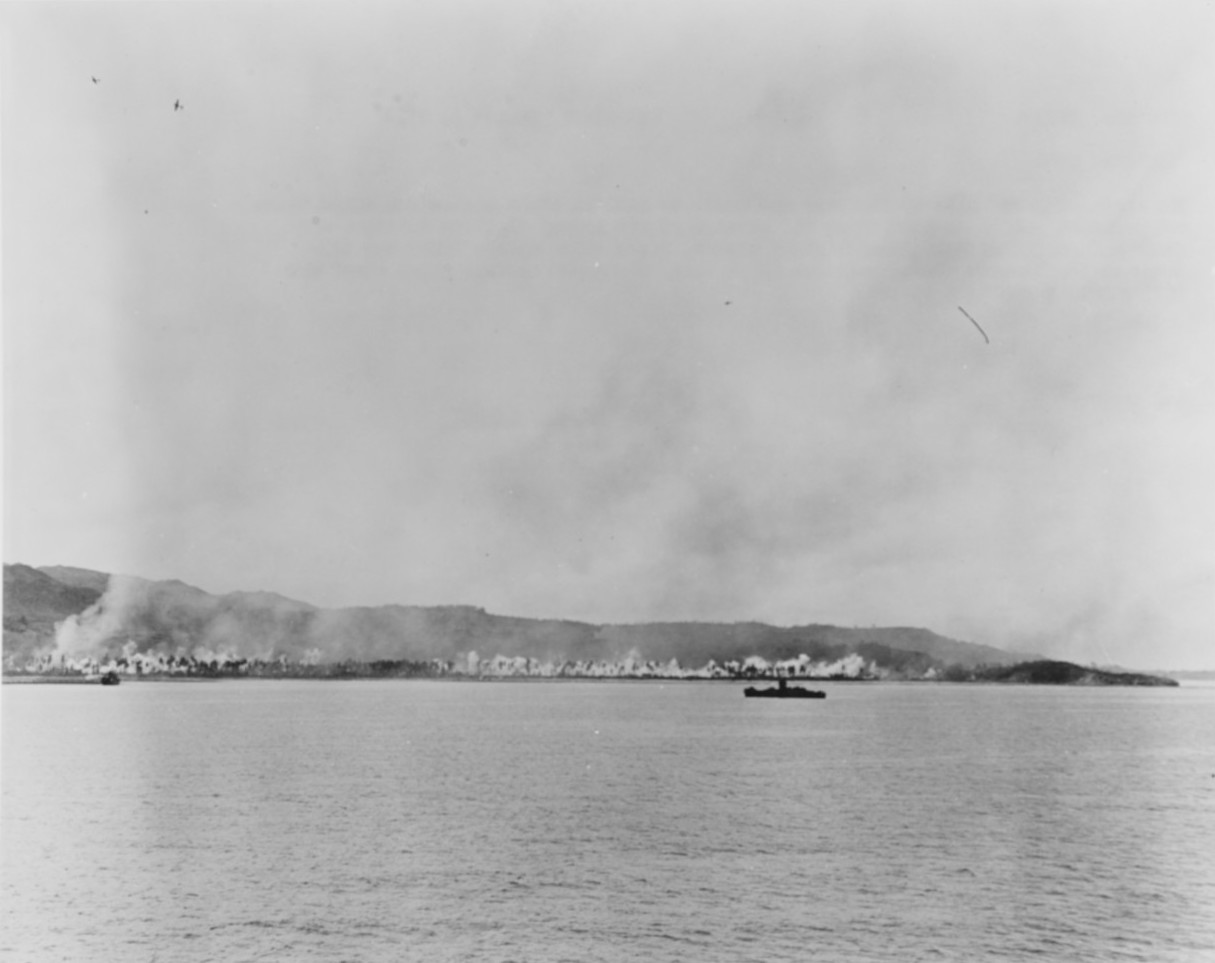
- Bombardment of the Asan shore. Asan Point on right. Note LCI gunboat and three aircraft on bombing runs.

- Location within Guam
- Location: N edge of Asan, Asan, Guam
- Coordinates: 13°28′22″N 144°42′46″E
- Area: 124 acres (50 ha)
- Built: 1944
- NRHP reference No.: 79002617
- Added to NRHP: February 14, 1979

The Asan Invasion Beach is a historic site in the village of Asan, Guam. The beaches of Asan were one of the landing sites of American forces in the 1944 Battle of Guam, in which the island was retaken from occupying Japanese forces. The designated historic site includes the beaches extending between Asan Point and Adelup Point and extends inland roughly to Guam Highway 1. It also includes the water area extending from the beach to the reef, about 100 metres (330 ft) out, an area that includes at least one abandoned Allied landing vehicle.

The beaches, fortifications, and water out to the reef were listed on the National Register of Historic Places in 1979. Portions of them are part of the Asan Beach Unit of the War in the Pacific National Historical Park, which includes a public access point at Asan Point. Just east of this is Memorial Beach Park, a municipal beachfront park that was listed on the National Register in 1974.

== Conservation ==
In 2024, the National Park Service began a project in the Asan Beach Unit to create a refuge for Guam's imperiled native birds, by recruiting volunteers to remove invasive brown tree snakes from the park. The site is an ideal area for snake exclusion since it is surrounded by ocean and highway.

== See also ==
- National Register of Historic Places listings in Guam
