= Asan, Guam =

Asan
- census-designated place
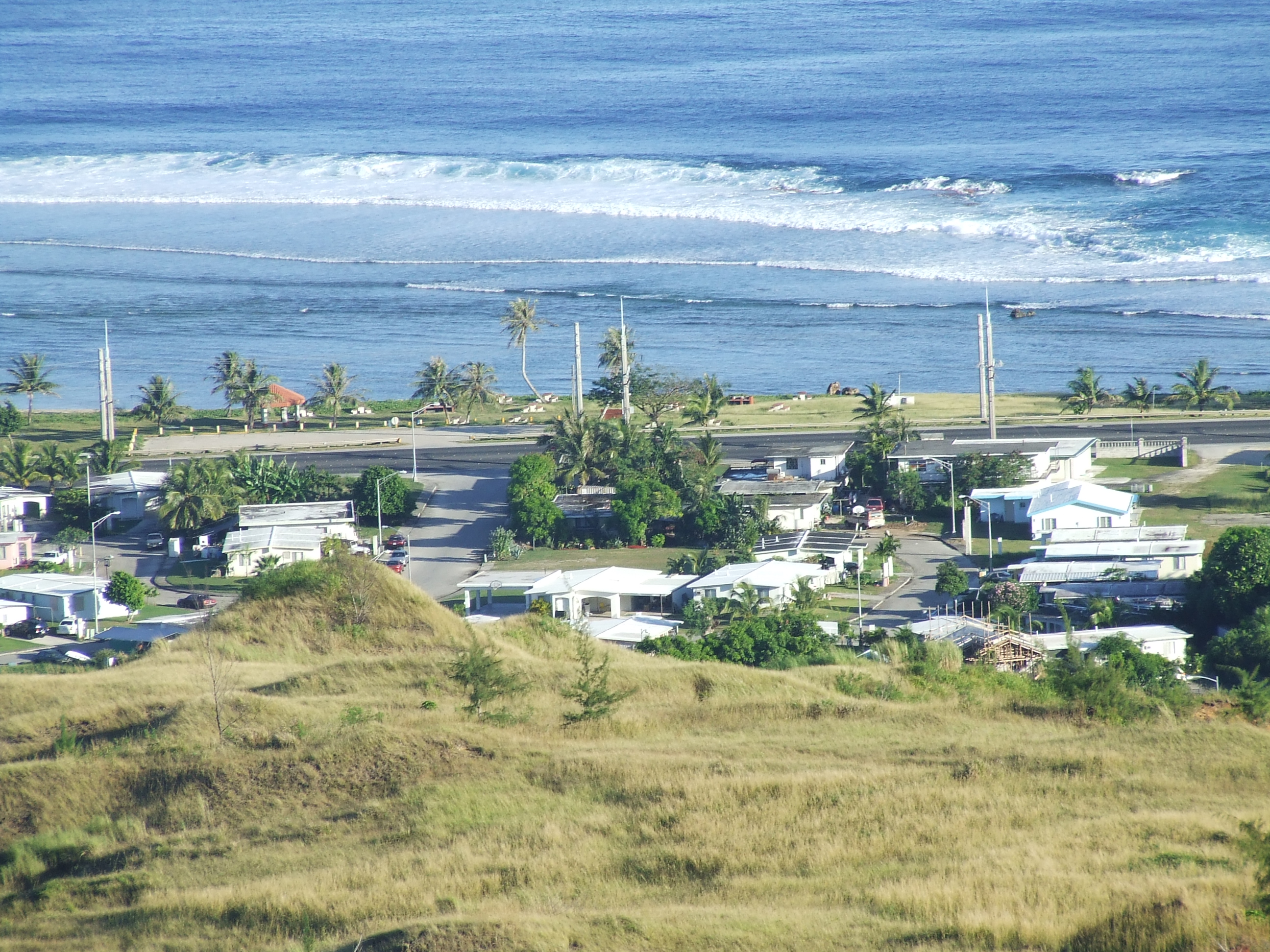
- Asan houses from the inland hills, 2005

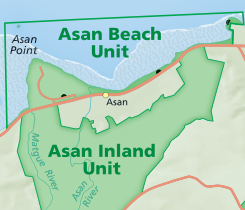
- Asan is completely surrounded by properties of War in the Pacific National Historical Park

- Asan on Guam
- Coordinates: 13.472°N 144.716°E
- Country: United States
- Territory: Guam
- Village: Asan-Maina

Population (2010)
  - Total: 853

Asan is a community and census-designated place (CDP) along the western coast of the U.S. territory of Guam. Asan, along with Maina and Nimitz Hill Annex, are the three communities in the village of Asan-Maina. It is known for being the location of the northern invasion beach used by the United States during the retaking of Guam in 1944.

== Geography ==
Asan lies along the western coast of Guam along Asan Bay, facing the Philippine Sea. It is surrounded by the Asan Beach Unit and Asan Inland Unit of War in the Pacific National Historical Park. The village lies between Asan Point and Adelup Point. Guam Highway 1, better known as Marine Corps Drive, provides access to Piti to the west and Maina to the east. Nimitz Hill Annex on the Nimitz Hill highlands inland of Asan is not directly accessible by road. The Asan River flows through the western part of the community. A distinguishing feature is the large grassy park at Asan Point, which is actually across Marine Corps Drive from the community in the Asan Beach Unit of War in the Pacific National Historical Park.

== History ==
Asan is thought to get its name from the CHamoru word hassan, meaning "scarce" or "rare." Before European contact, Asan was primarily a fishing village. The Spanish who colonized Guam in the late seventeenth century converted the village into an agricultural settlement, primarily farming taro, rice, and sugar cane. Asan lay along the only real road on Guam, which connected the port at Piti to the capital of Hagåtña. A leper colony established at Asan Point in 1892 was destroyed by the Typhoon of 1900. The next year, Filipino insurrectionists arrested during the Philippine–American War were placed in a prison camp constructed at the same location. The most prominent of the prisoners, Apolinario Mabini, was the first Prime Minister of the Philippines.

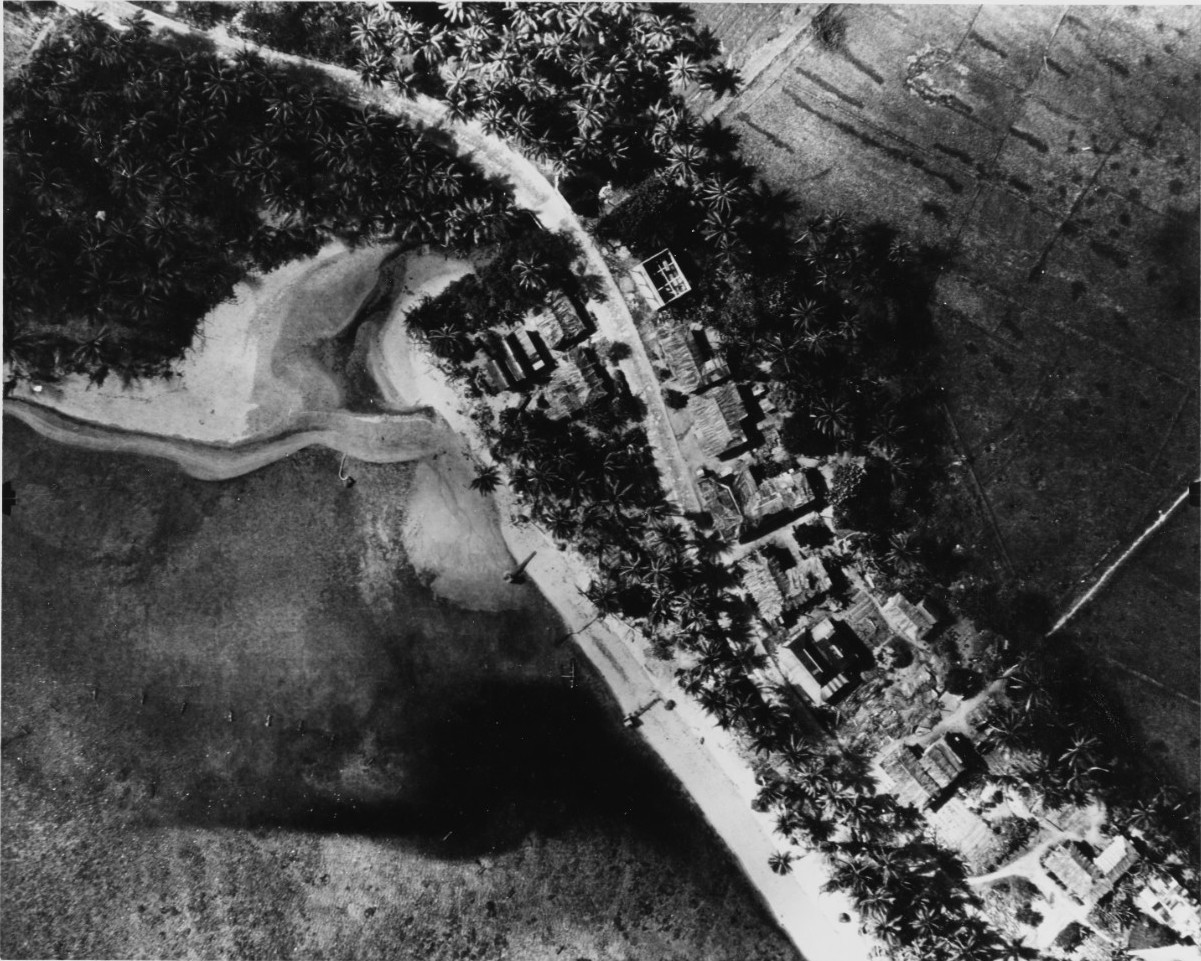
Aerial photo of the mouth of the Asan River in June 1944. Houses cluster along the road with farms inland. All of these structures would be destroyed in the U.S. bombardment preceding the Battle of Guam the following month.

In 1917, the prison camp was used again to temporarily house sailors from the SMS Cormoran, the first German prisoners-of-war taken by the United States in World War I. Five years later, in 1922, Asan Point was converted into a United States Marine Corps camp. However, the camp, and much of the rest of Guam, was demilitarized in 1931 as a result of U.S. isolationism between the World Wars. During the Japanese occupation from 1941, Japanese forces constructed defensive strongpoints at Asan and Adelup Points, as well as the Libugon highlands overlooking Asan Bay. In 1944, the U.S. military chose the Asan Invasion Beach as the northern attack beginning the Battle of Guam. Three battleships, three cruisers, and three destroyers, as well as carrier-based aircraft, bombarded the area, destroying all pre-war structures in Asan. The bombardment was followed by 180 landing craft bringing Marines to the shore in the face of fierce Japanese resistance.

After the end of the Pacific War, the U.S. Navy Seabees maintained a headquarters at Camp Asan at the point until 1947. The residents of Asan who returned to rebuild their homes were moved further away from the coast, creeping up to the bottom of the highlands, renamed Nimitz Hill. From 1948 to 1967, the area around Asan Point became "Civil Service Camp," a small military facility with housing and amenities such as an outdoor theater, tennis courts, and a fire station. In 1968, the number of injured servicemembers arriving from the Vietnam War began to strain the resources of Naval Hospital Guam, and Civil Service Camp was converted into Advanced Base Naval Hospital, also known as the Asan Annex. This Asan Annex was used until 1973, only to be converted into an emergency refugee camp for Vietnamese fleeing after the Fall of Saigon in 1975. Dubbed Operation New Life, the 110,000 refugees overwhelmed the initial camp at Asan, requiring the construction of a larger camp at Orote Field on Naval Base Guam.

In 1976, Typhoon Pamela destroyed all the buildings at Asan Point and their wreckage was removed by the U.S. Navy. The National Park Service acquired the land from the military in 1978, establishing War in the Pacific National Historical Park. In the 1980s, the community of Asan was redeveloped by the Guam Housing and Urban Renewal Authority. While the post-war Asan was a village of winding streets with Spanish-style houses, the redevelopment straightened streets, added sidewalks, and rebuilt most homes in concrete.

== Education ==
The Guam Department of Education operates non-military public schools.

In regards to the Department of Defense Education Activity (DoDEA), Asan is in the school transportation zone for McCool Elementary and McCool Middle School, while Guam High School is the island's sole DoDEA high school.
