= Asan-Maina, Guam =

Coordinates: 13°28′17″N 144°42′50″E

Asan-Maina Assan-Ma'ina
- Village
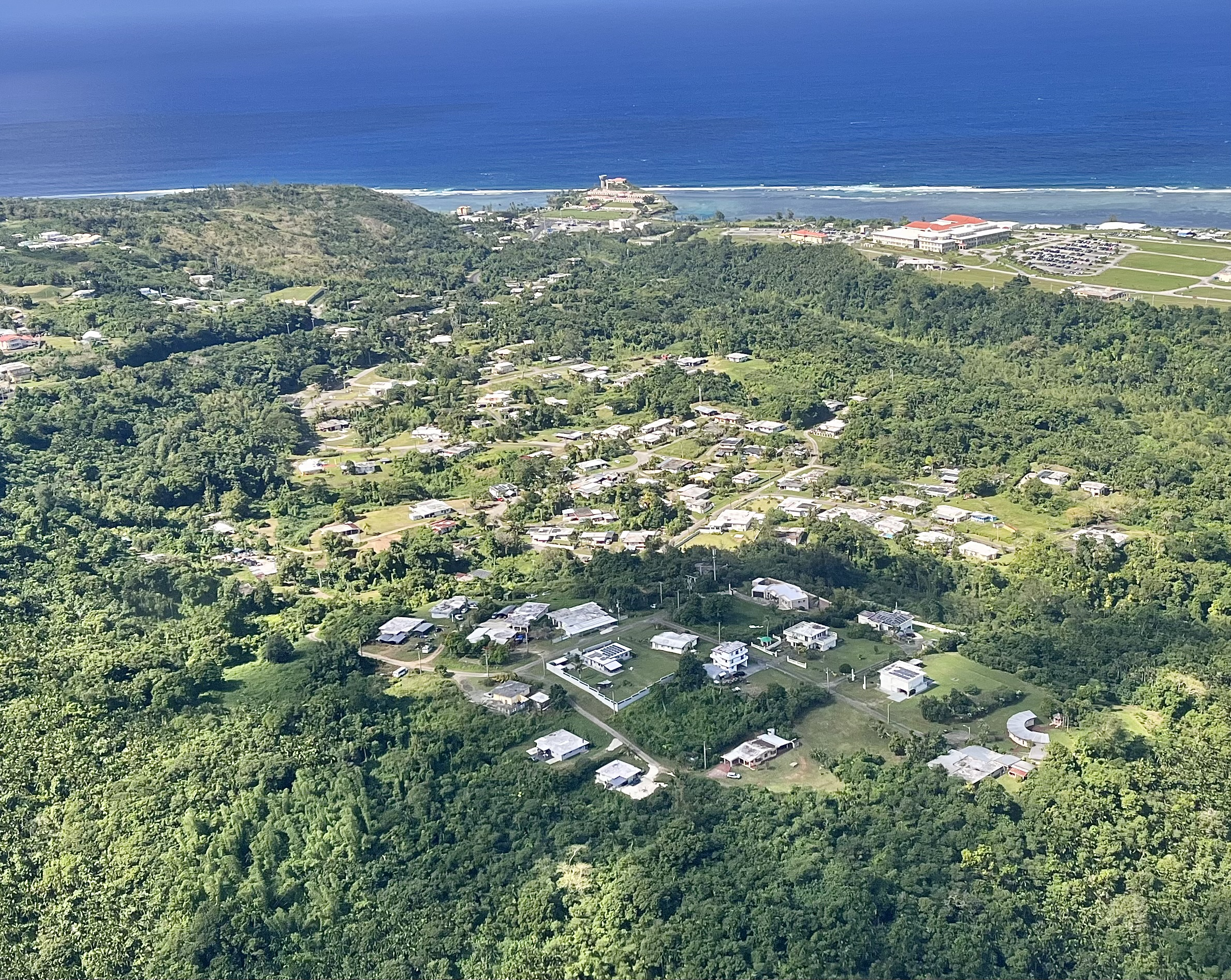

- Location of Asan-Maina within the Territory of Guam.
- Country: United States
- Territory: Guam

Government
  - Mayor: Frank A. Salas (D)

Population (2020)
  - Total: 2,011
  - Ethnic groups: Chamorro
- Time zone: UTC+10 (ChST)
- Village Flower: Plumeria rubra

Asan-Maina (Chamorro: Assan-Ma'ina) is a village located on the western shore of the United States territory of Guam. The municipality combines the names of the coastal community of Asan with Maina, a community along the slopes of the Fonte River valley to the east. Asan was the northern landing site for United States Marines during Guam's liberation from the Japanese during World War II. Asan Beach Park is part of the War in the Pacific National Historic Park. The third community comprising Asan-Maina is Nimitz Hill Annex in the hills above Asan and Maina, which is the location of the Joint Region Marianas headquarters. Asan-Maina is located in the Luchan (Western) District.

== Etymology ==
Asan derives its name from the Chamorro word hassan meaning scarce or rare.

One meaning of the word ma’ina refers to an infant who, between the time of birth and baptism, is taken by the mother to Mass before sunrise. This old ritual was considered analogous to and in imitation of the Presentation of Jesus in the Temple.

== History ==
On July 21, 1944, the Americans landed in Asan to recapture the island from occupying Japanese forces during the Battle of Guam. The 3rd Marine Division landed in Asan at 08:28, and the 1st Provisional Marine Brigade landed near Agat to the south. Japanese artillery sank 20 Landing Vehicle Trackeds, but by 09:00 tanks were ashore at both beaches. United States Marines fought Japanese forces fortified in the hills above the shore after establishing a beach head. During the following week, Americans pursued retreating Japanese forces northward and eventually won the battle.

From April to November 1975 the former Camp Asan was used as a refugee camp for South Vietnamese refugees during Operation New Life.

On August 6, 1997, Korean Air Flight 801 crashed east of Nimitz Hill Annex in Asan. A memorial was later constructed.

== Demographics ==
Historical population
Census	Pop.	Note	%±
1960	3,053		—
1970	2,629		−13.9%
1980	2,034		−22.6%
1990	2,070		1.8%
2000	2,090		1.0%
2010	2,137		2.2%
2020	2,011		−5.9%

The U.S. Census Bureau counts the following census-designated places in Asan-Maina: Asan, Maina, and Nimitz Hill Annex.

== Education ==
Guam Public School System serves the island. Southern High School in Santa Rita serves the village.

In regards to the Department of Defense Education Activity (DoDEA), Asan is in the school transportation zone for McCool Elementary and McCool Middle School, while Guam High School is the island's sole DoDEA high school.

== Parks and recreation ==
Every year the island's largest Easter egg hunt is at the War in the Pacific National Park with over 10,000 eggs. The village also hosts the yearly International Kite Flying Competitions with people from South Korea, Japan, China, Guam, and the Northern Mariana Islands competing for the championship.

== Government ==
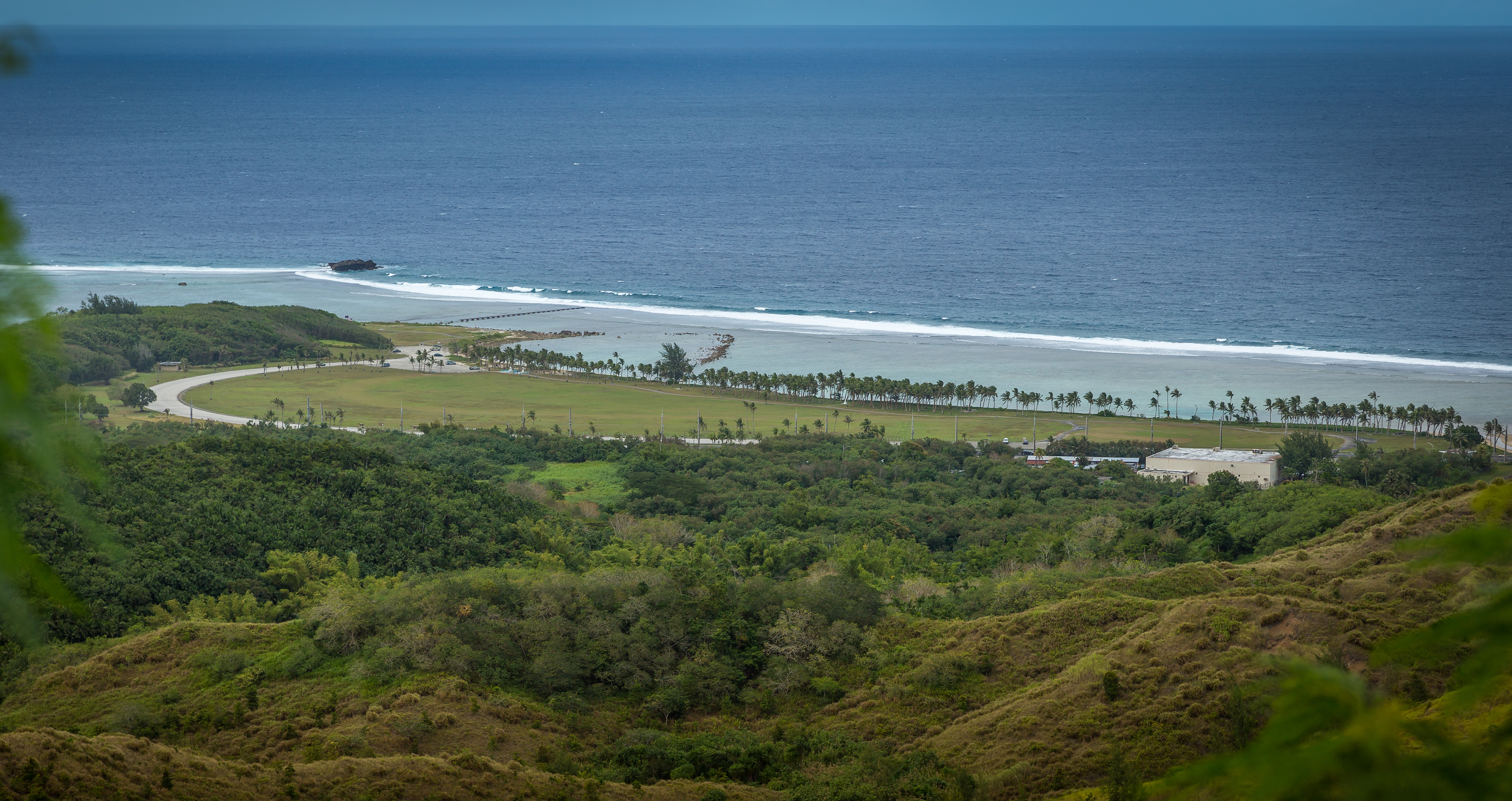
View of the Asan Beach Unit of War in the Pacific National Historical Park and buildings in Asan from the highlands of Nimitz Hill Annex

Commissioner of Asan-Maina
Name	Term begin	Term end
Enrique S. Cruz	1927	1931
Santiago A. Limtiaco (1st term)	1931	1938
Joaquin L. Jesus	1938	1941
Santiago A. Limtiaco (2nd term)	1944	1957
Joaquin S. Santos	1957	January 1, 1973

Mayor of Asan-Maina
Name	Party	Term begin	Term end
Jose S. Quitugua	Democratic	January 1. 1973	January 5, 1981
Daniel L. Guerrero	Democratic	January 5, 1981	January 7, 1985
Frank A. Acfalle	Republican	January 7, 1985	January 2, 1989
Vicente L. San Nicolas	Democratic	January 2, 1989	January 7, 2013
Joana Margaret C. Blas	Republican	January 7, 2013	January 2, 2017
Frank "Frankie" A. Salas	Democratic	January 2, 2017	present

== See also ==
- Villages of Guam
