= 10th Independent Mixed Regiment =

10th Independent Mixed Regiment was a regiment of the Imperial Japanese Army that has association with a number of U.S. National Register of Historic Places-listed places in Guam.

Fortifications associated include:

- Garapan Mount Pillbox, address restricted, Talofofo, GU
- Ilik River Fortification II, shore of Ylig Point, Yona, GU
- Malessu' Pillbox, Talona Beach on Cocos Lagoon, Merizo, GU
- Mana Pillbox, south shore of As Anite Cove, Talofofo, GU
- Matala' Pillbox, address restricted, Talofofo, GU
- Talofofo-Talu'fofo' Pillbox, south shore of Ylig river, Talofofo, GU
- Tokcha' Pillbox, Toghca Point shoreline, Ipan, GU

== See also ==
- Tomhum Pillbox II, west shore of Naton Beach on Tumon Bay, Tumon, GU, associated with the 48th Independent Mixed Brigade
