= Talofofo Falls =

Scenic cascades in the Ugum River on Guam

Coordinates: 13.324°N 144.737°E

The Talofofo Falls are a scenic series of cascades on the Ugum River on the island of Guam. They are located in the southeast of the island, inland from Talofofo Bay. It is also where Shōichi Yokoi, one of the last 3 Japanese holdouts of World War 2, was discovered in Yokoi's Cave.

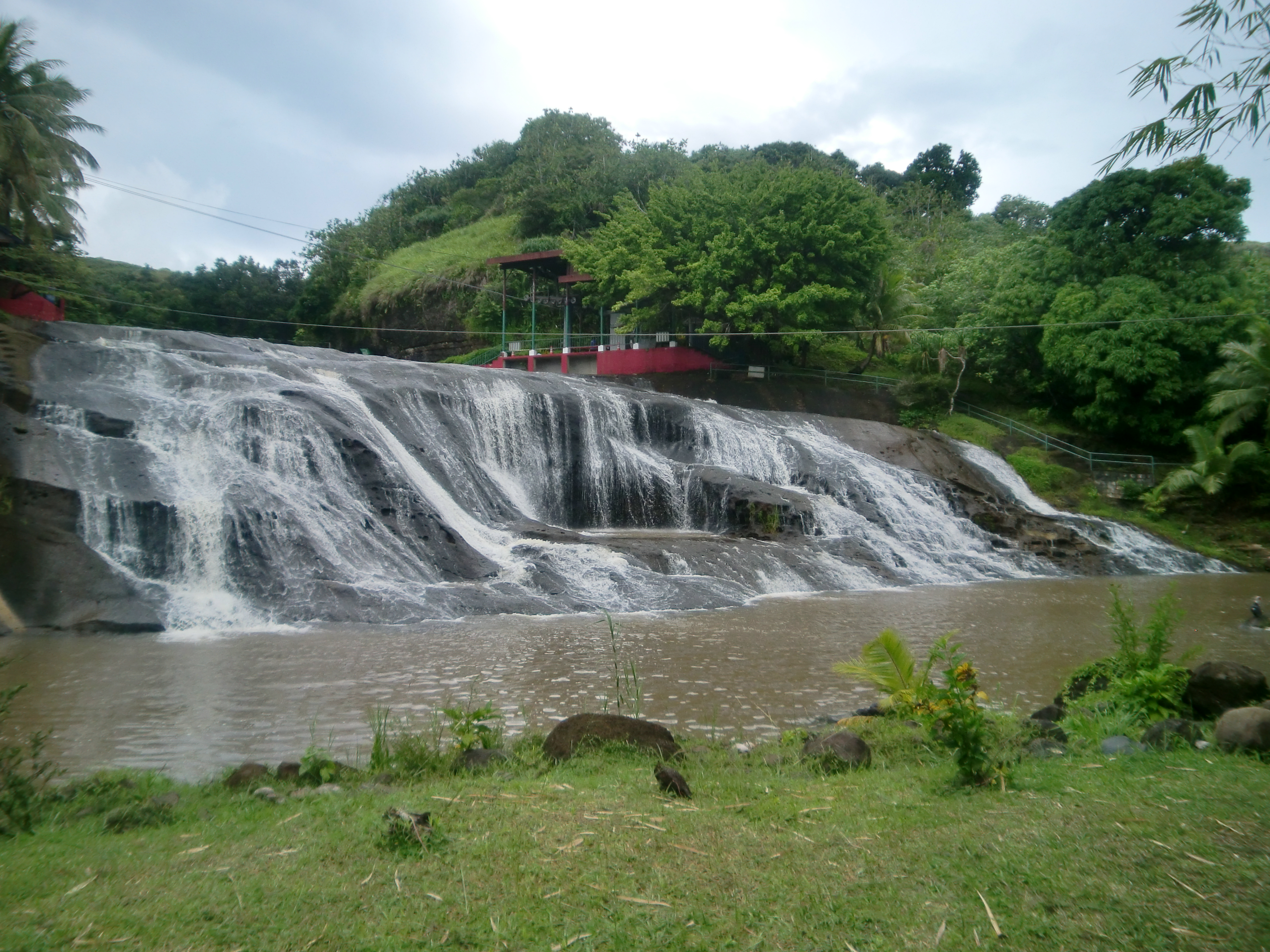
Lower Talofofo Falls

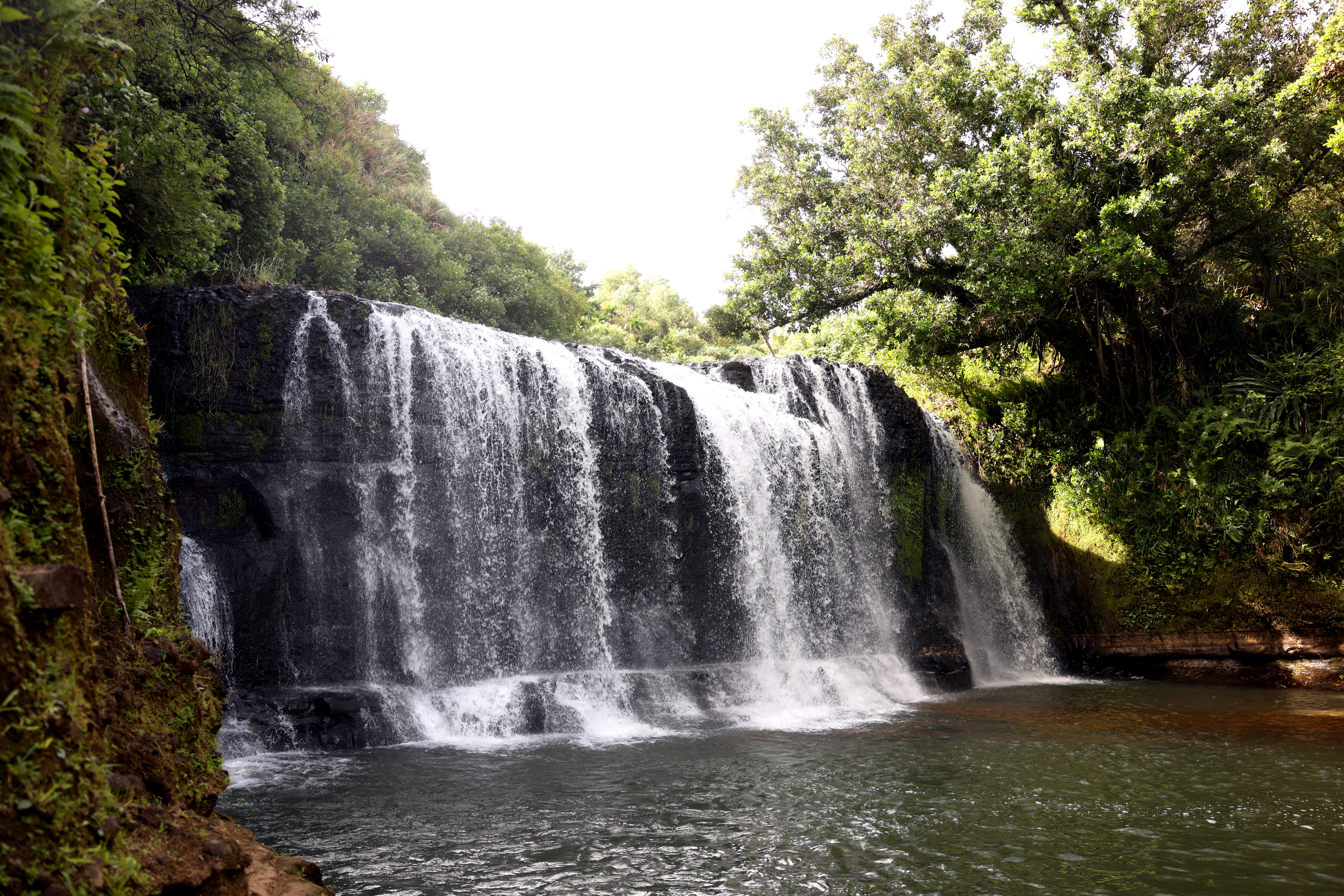
Upper Talofofo Falls

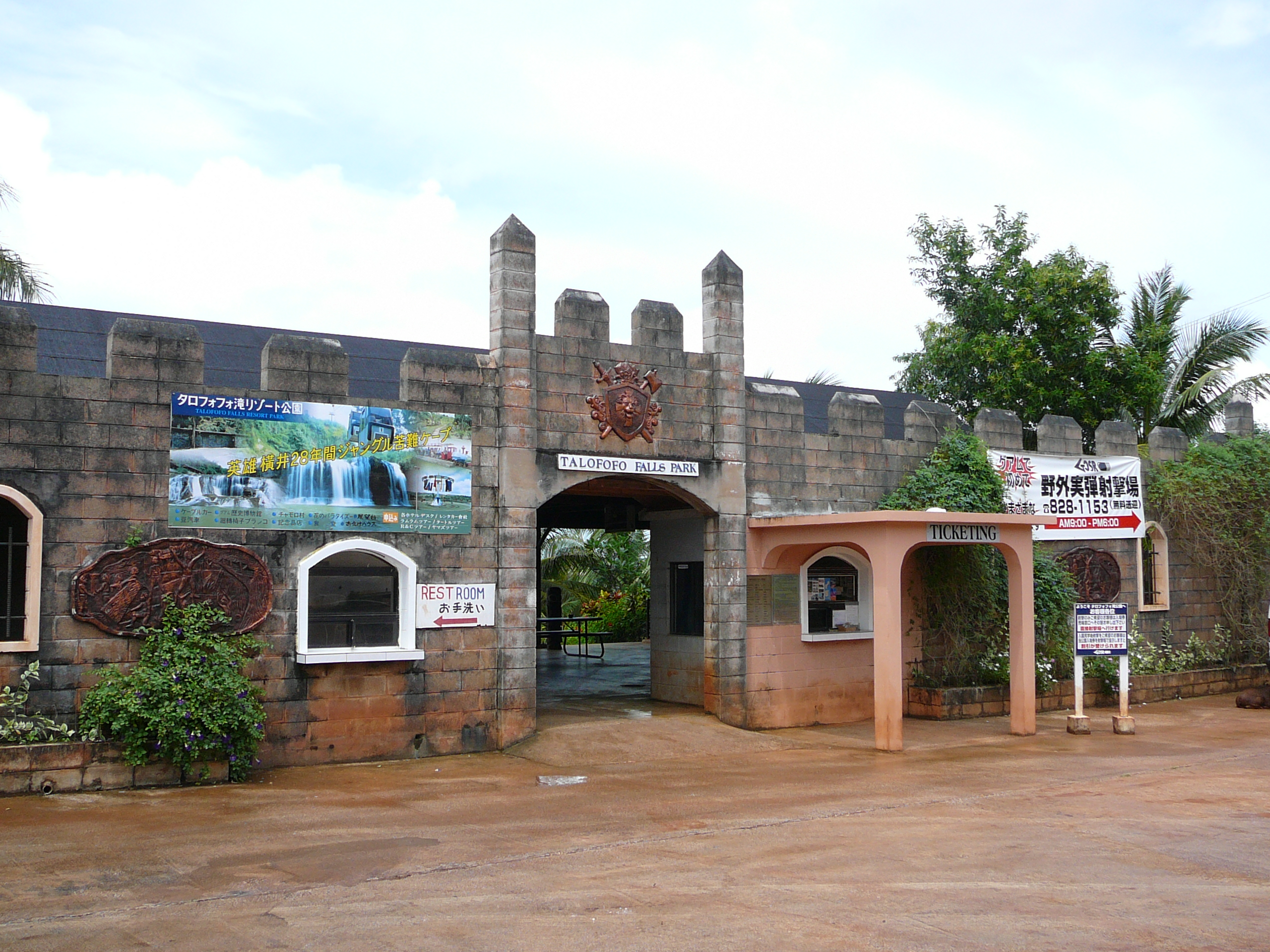
Entrance in 2006

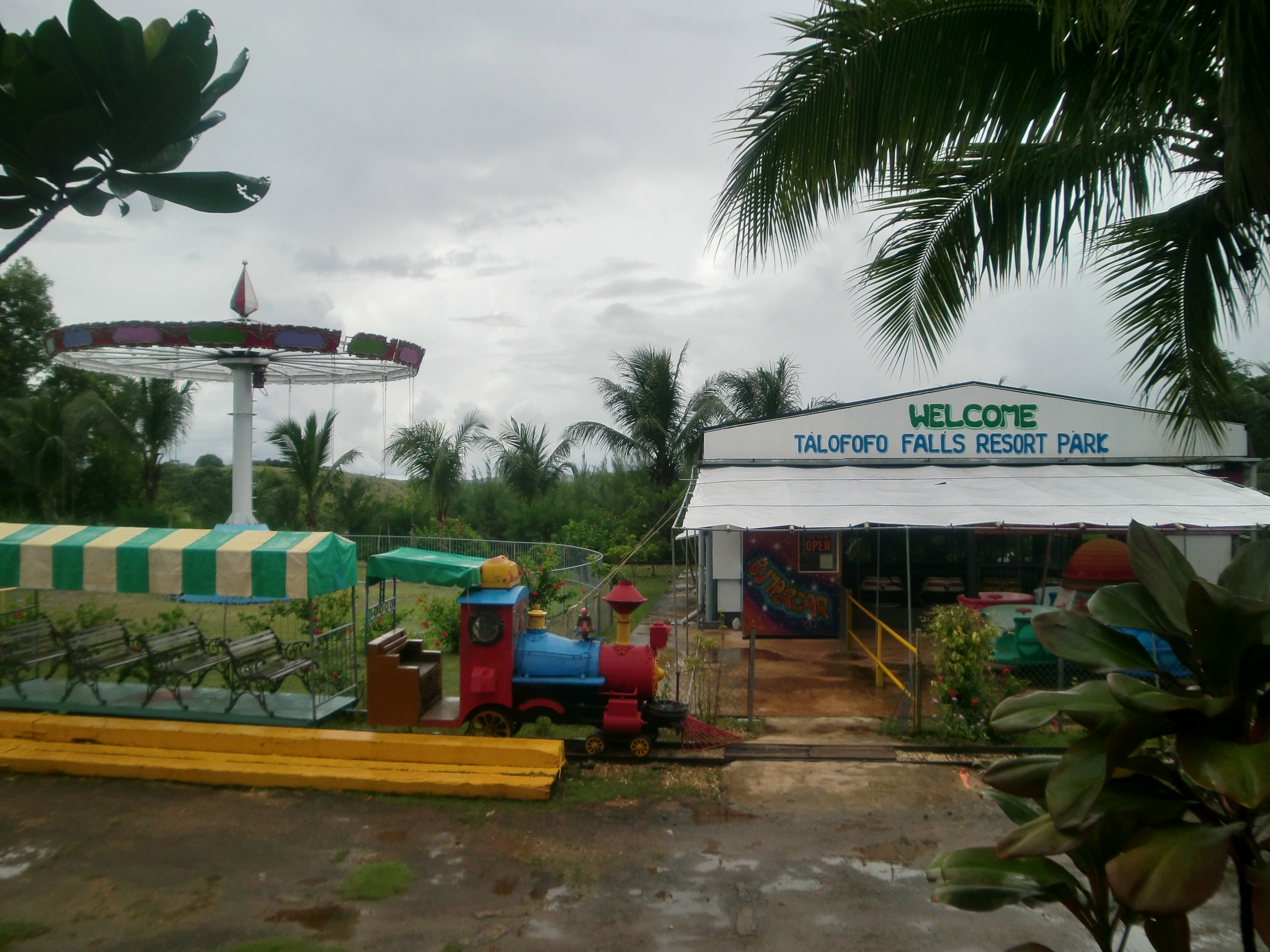
In 2010

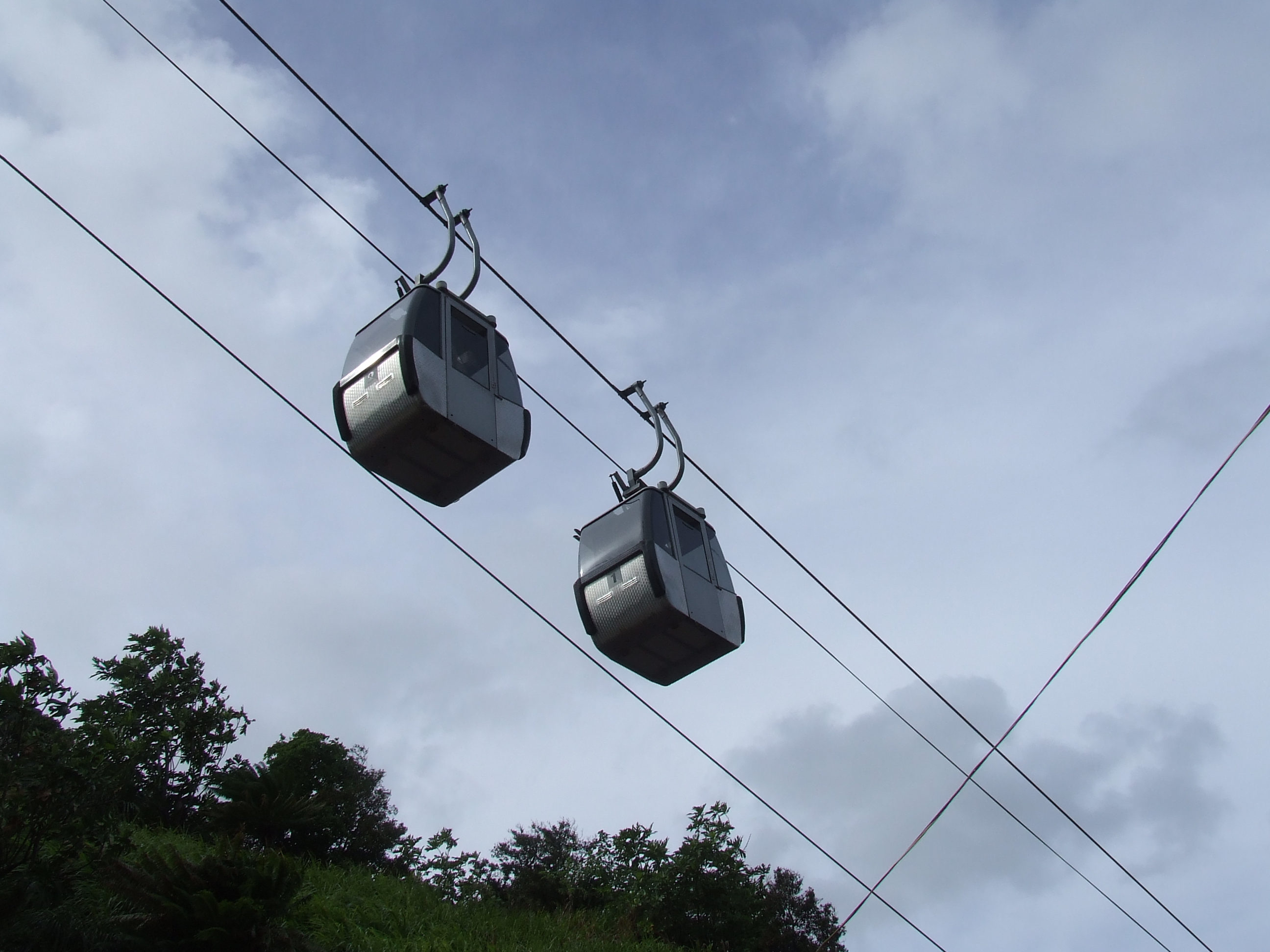
Cable car in 2006

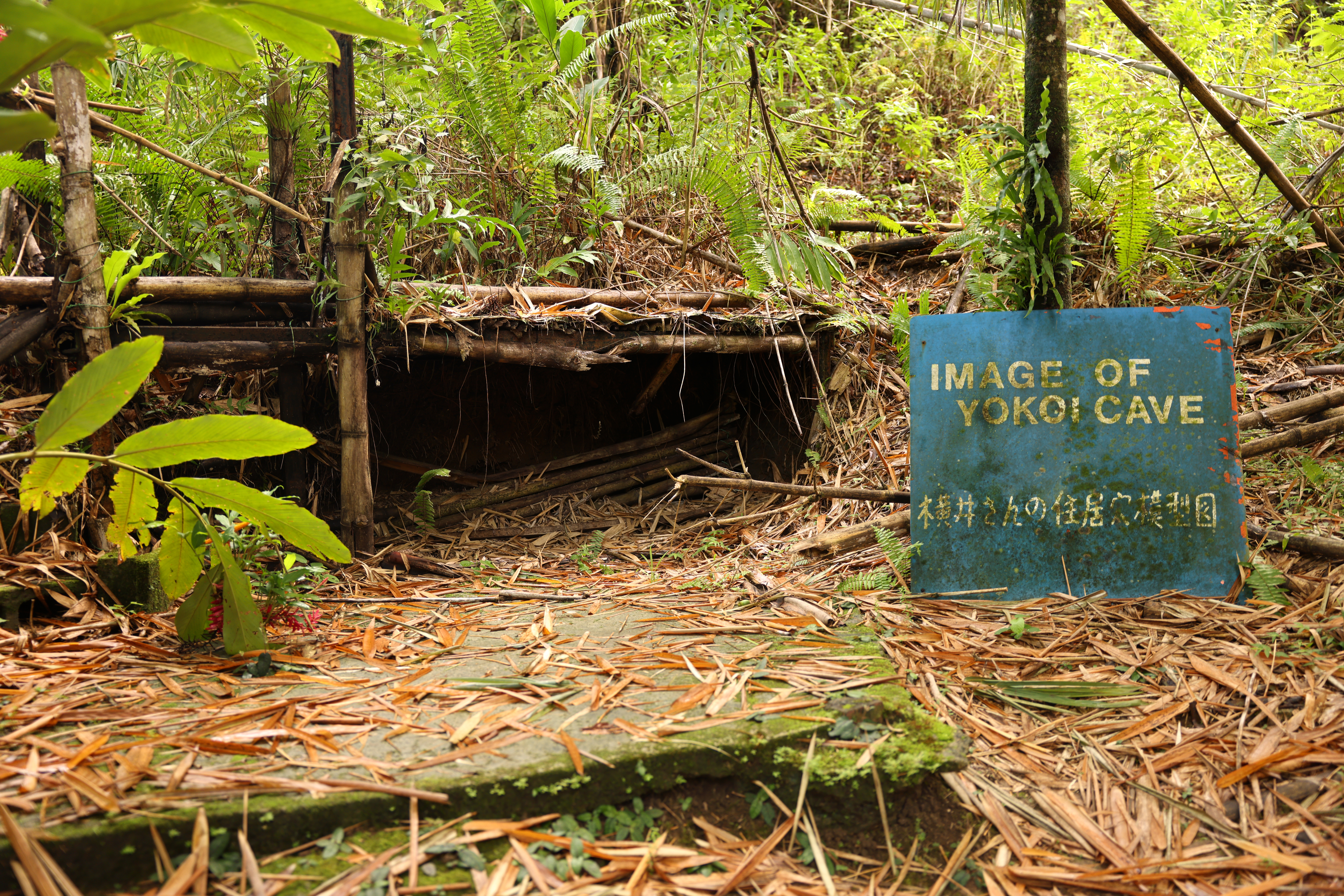
Yokoi's Cave in 2025
