= Aratama =

Aratama is a Japanese surname. People with this surname include:

- Michiyo Aratama (新珠 三千代, 1930–2001), Japanese actress
- Misato Aratama (新玉 美郷, born 1991), Japanese badminton player

== See also ==
- Aratama District, which was merged into Inasa District, Shizuoka in 1896
- Aratama Maru, Japanese merchant ship launched in 1938
