= Survival skills =

Techniques for sustaining life, typically in adverse conditions

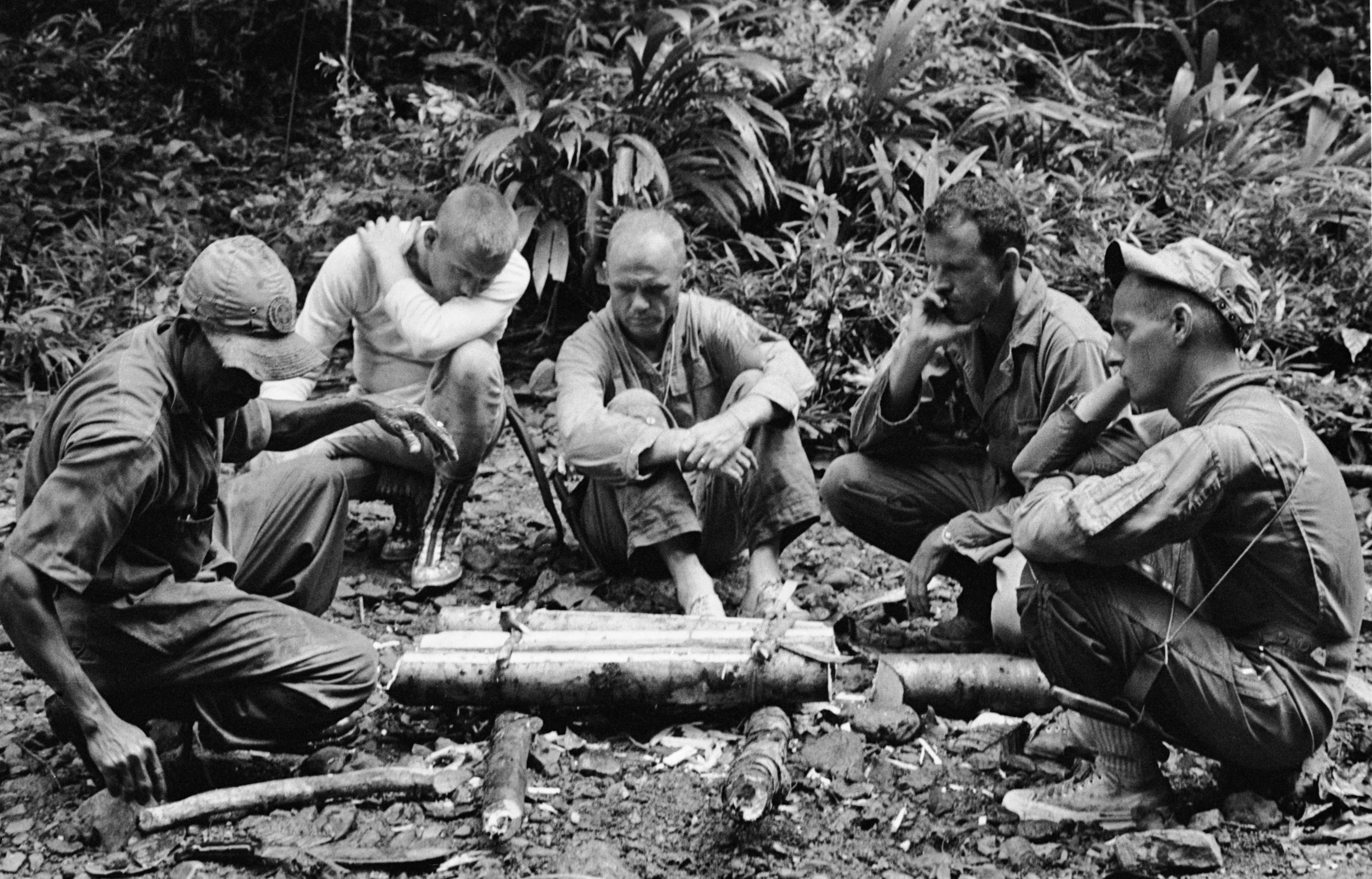
Astronauts participating in tropical survival training at an Air Force Base near the Panama Canal, 1963. From left to right are an unidentified trainer, Neil Armstrong, John H. Glenn Jr., L. Gordon Cooper, and Pete Conrad. Survival training is important for astronauts, as a launch abort or misguided reentry could potentially land them in a remote wilderness area.

Survival skills are techniques used to sustain life in any type of natural environment or built environment. These techniques are meant to provide basic necessities for human life, including water, food, and shelter. Survival skills also support proper knowledge and interactions with animals and plants to promote the sustaining of life over time.

Survival skills are basic ideas and abilities that ancient people invented and passed down for thousands of years. Today, survival skills are often associated with surviving in a disaster situation.

Outdoor activities such as hiking, backpacking, horseback riding, fishing, and hunting all require basic wilderness survival skills, especially to handle emergencies. Individuals who practice survival skills as a type of outdoor recreation or hobby may describe themselves as survivalists. Survival skills are often used by people living off-grid lifestyles such as homesteaders. Bushcraft and primitive living are most often self-implemented but require many of the same skills.

== First aid ==
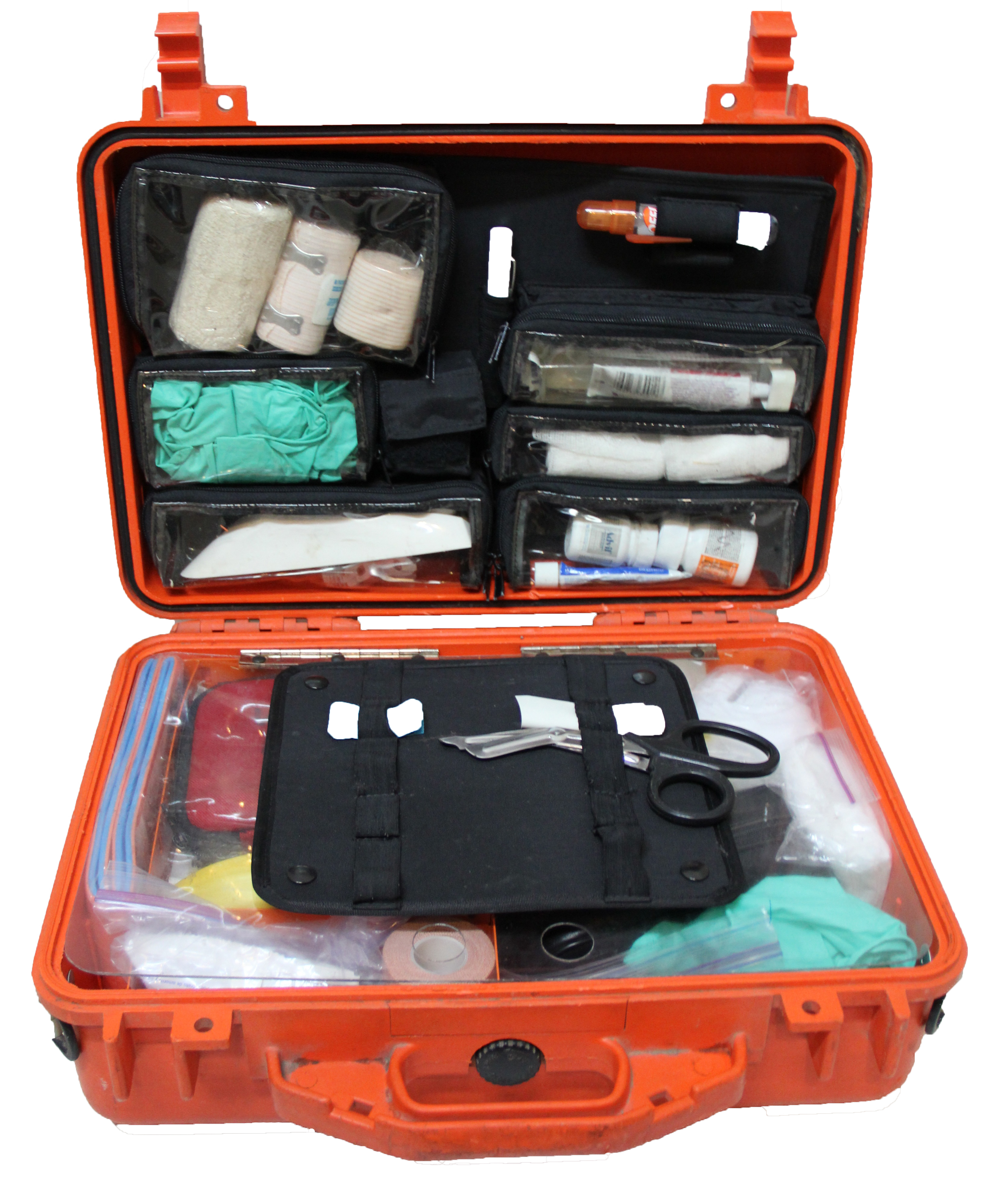
A first aid kit containing equipment that can treat common injuries and illness.

First aid (wilderness first aid in particular) can help a person survive and function with injuries and illnesses that would otherwise kill or compromise them. Common and dangerous injuries include:

- Bites from snakes, spiders, and other wild animals
- Bone fractures
- Burns
- Drowsiness
- Headache
- Heart attack
- Hemorrhage
- Hypothermia and hyperthermia
- Infection from food, animal contact, or drinking non-potable water
- Poisoning from poisonous plants or fungi
- Sprains, particularly of the ankle
- Vomiting
- Wounds, which may become infected

The person may need to apply the contents of a first aid kit or, if possessing the required knowledge, naturally occurring medicinal plants, immobilize injured limbs, or even transport incapacitated comrades.

== Shelter ==
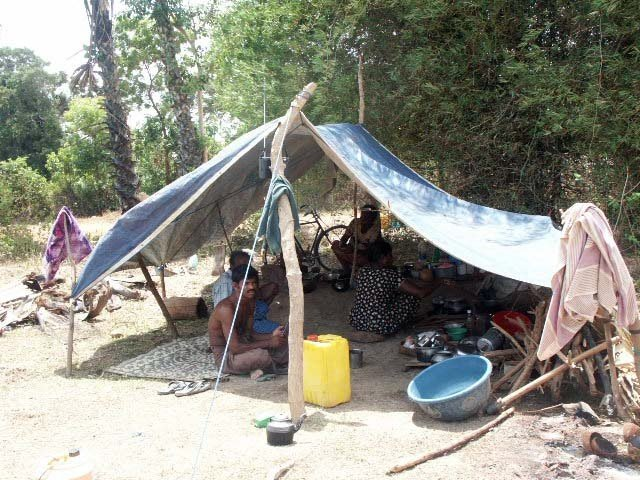
Photo release by the Tamils Rehabilitation Organisation depicting a shelter built from tarp and sticks. Pictured are displaced people from the Sri Lankan Civil War.

Many people who are forced into survival situations often have an elevated risk of danger because of direct exposure to the elements. Many people in survival situations die of hypothermia or hyperthermia, or animal attacks. An effective shelter can range from a natural shelter, such as a cave, overhanging rock outcrop, or a fallen-down tree, to an intermediate form of man-made shelter such as a debris hut, tree pit shelter, or snow cave, to a completely man-made structure such as a tarp, tent, or a longhouse. It is noted that some common properties between these structures are:

- Location (away from hazards, such as cliffs; and nearby materials, like food sources)
- Insulation (from the ground, rain, wind, air, or sun)
- Heat Source (either body heat or fire-heated)
- Personal or Group Shelter (having multiple individuals)

== Fire ==
Fire is a tool that helps meet many survival needs. A campfire can be used to boil water, rendering it safe to drink, and to cook food. Fire also creates a sense of safety and protection, which can provide an overlooked psychological boost. When temperatures are low, fire can postpone or prevent the risk of hypothermia. In a wilderness survival situation, fire can provide a sense of home in addition to being an essential energy source. Fire may deter wild animals from interfering with an individual, though some wild animals may also be attracted to the light and heat of a fire.

There are numerous methods for starting a fire in a survival situation. Fires are either started with the case of the solar spark lighter, or through a spark, as in the case of a flint striker. Fires will often be extinguished if either there is excessive wind, or if the fuel or environment is too wet. Lighting a fire without a lighter or matches, e.g. by using natural flint and metal with tinder, is a frequent subject of both books on survival and in survival courses, because it allows an individual to start a fire with few materials in the event of a disaster. There is an emphasis placed on practicing fire-making skills before venturing into the wilderness. Producing fire under adverse conditions has been made much easier by the introduction of tools such as the magnesium striker, solar spark lighter, and the fire piston.

== Water ==
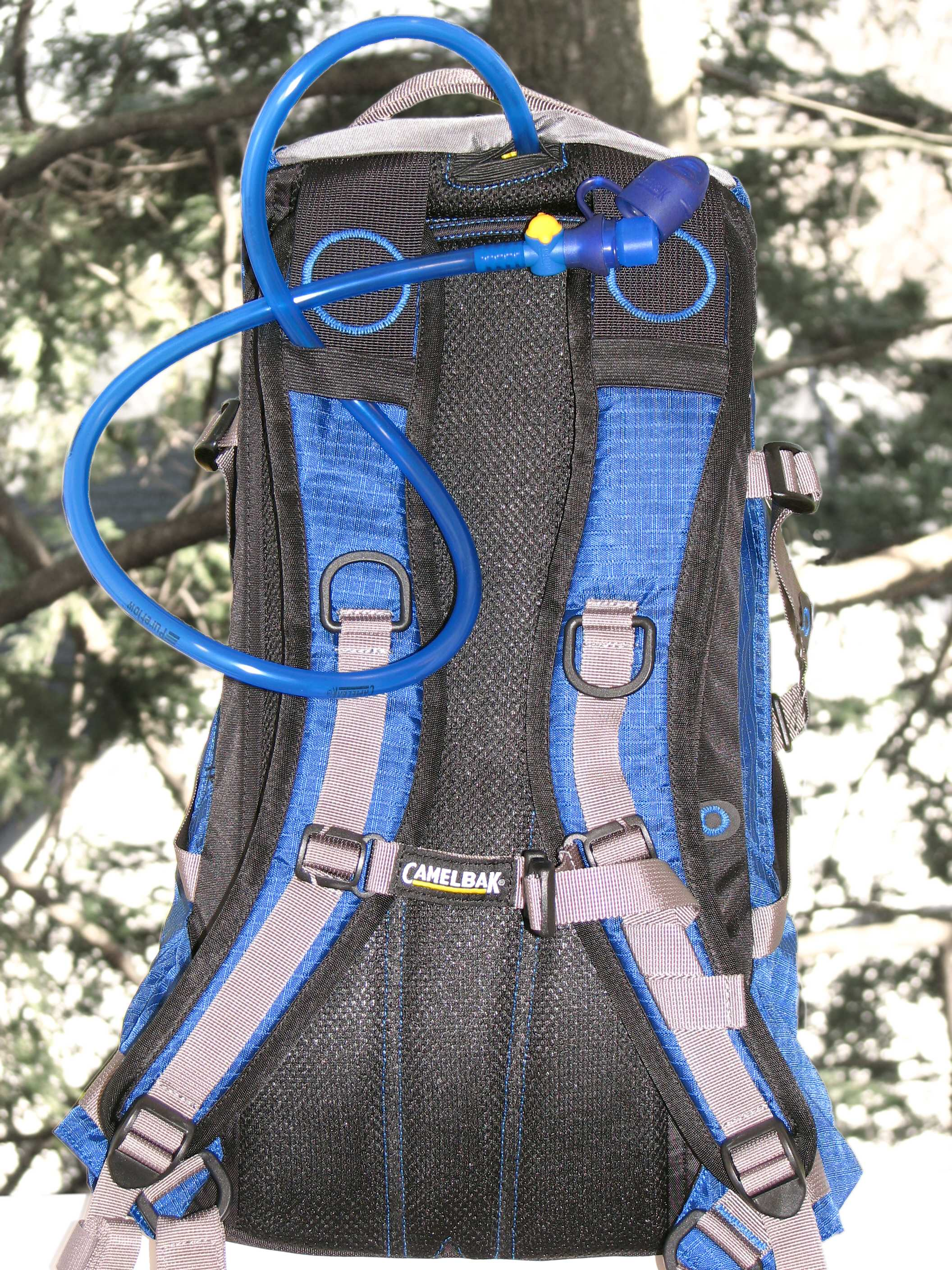
Hydration pack manufactured by Camelbak.

A human being can survive an average of three to five days without water. Since the human body is composed of an average of 60% water, it should be no surprise that water is higher on the list than food. The need for water dictates that unnecessary water loss by perspiration should be avoided in survival situations. Perspiration and the need for water increase with exercise. Although human water intake varies greatly depending on factors like age and sex, the average human should drink about 13 cups or 3 liters per day. Many people in survival situations perish due to dehydration, and/or the debilitating effects of water-borne pathogens from untreated water.

A typical person will lose a minimum of two to four liters of water per day under ordinary conditions, and more in hot, dry, or cold weather. Four to six liters of water or other liquids are generally required each day in the wilderness to avoid dehydration and to keep the body functioning properly. The U.S. Army survival manual does not recommend drinking water only when thirsty, as this leads to inadequate hydration. Instead, water should be consumed at regular intervals. Other groups recommend rationing water through "water discipline".

A lack of water causes dehydration, which may result in lethargy, headaches, dizziness, confusion, and eventually death. Even mild dehydration reduces endurance and impairs concentration, which is dangerous in a survival situation where clear thinking is essential. Dark yellow or brown urine is a diagnostic indicator of dehydration. To avoid dehydration, a high priority is typically assigned to locating a supply of drinking water and making provisions to render that water as safe as possible.

Recent thinking is that boiling or commercial filters are significantly safer than the use of chemicals, with the exception of chlorine dioxide.

== Food ==
Culinary root tubers, fruit, edible mushrooms, edible nuts, edible beans, edible cereals or edible leaves, edible cacti, ants and algae can be gathered and, if needed, prepared (mostly by boiling). With the exception of leaves, these foods are relatively high in calories, providing some energy to the body. Plants are some of the easiest food sources to find in the jungle, forest, or desert because they are stationary and can thus be obtained without exerting much effort. Animal trapping, hunting, and fishing allow a survivalist to acquire high-calorie meat but require certain skills and equipment (such as bows, snares, and nets).

Focusing on survival until rescued, the Boy Scouts of America especially discourages foraging for wild foods on the grounds that the knowledge and skills needed to make a safe decision are unlikely to be possessed by those finding themselves in a wilderness survival situation.

== Navigation ==
Celestial navigation: using the Southern Cross to navigate South without a compass.

When going on a hike or trip in an unfamiliar location, search and rescue advises to notify a trusted contact of your destination, your planned return time, and then notify them when returning. In the event you do not return in the specified time frame, (e.g. 12 hours of the scheduled return time), your contact can contact the police for search and rescue.

Survival situations can often be resolved by finding a way to safety, or a more suitable location to wait for rescue. Types of navigation include:

- Celestial navigation, using the sun and the night sky to locate the cardinal directions and to maintain course of travel
- Using a map, compass or GPS receiver
- Dead reckoning
- Natural navigation, using the condition of surrounding natural objects (i.e. moss on a tree, snow on a hill, direction of running water, etc.)

== Mental preparedness ==
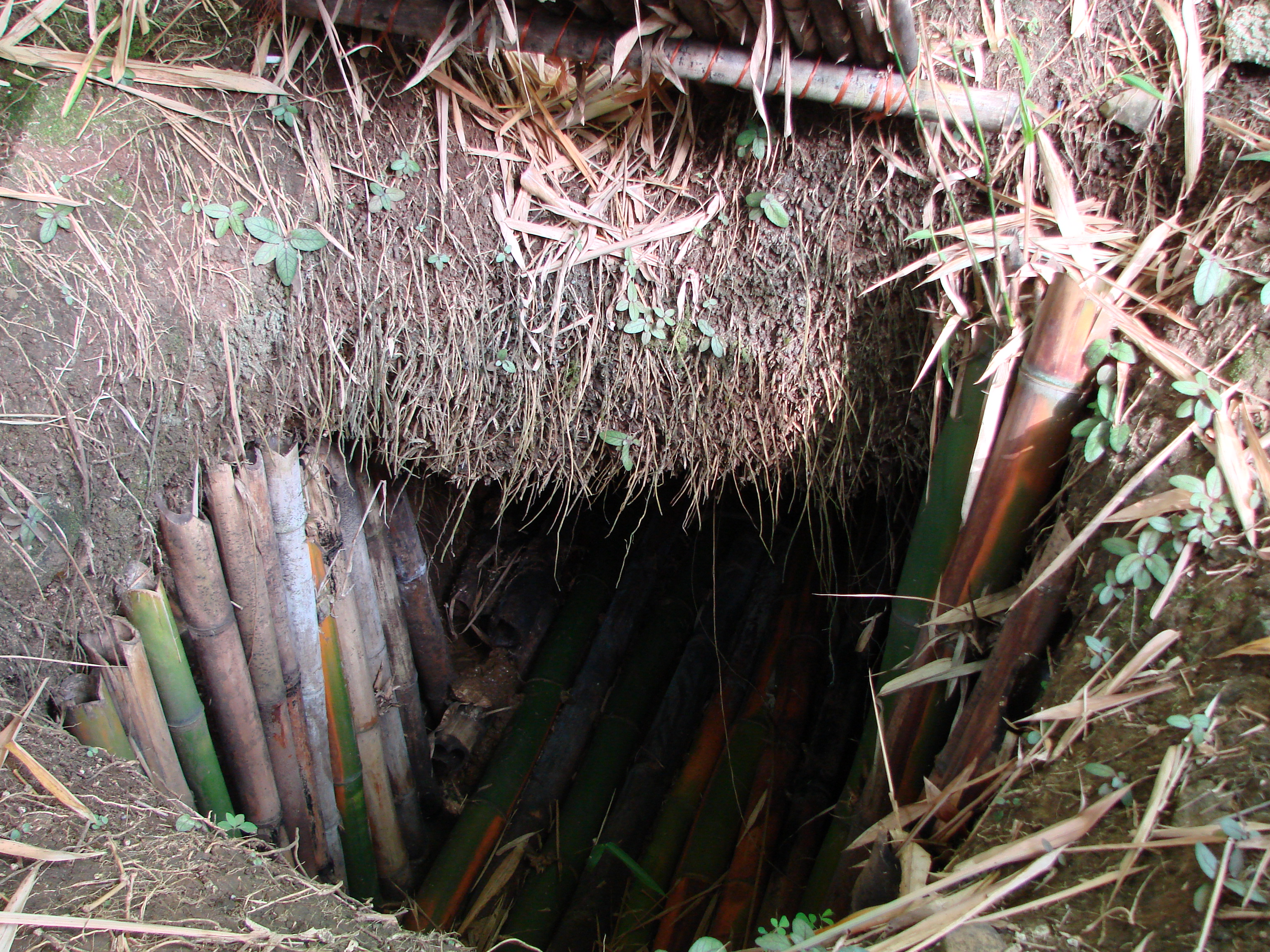
Japanese sergeant Shoichi Yokoi spent 28 years in a self-dug cave in the jungle of Guam, where he hid to avoid capture by US forces in World War II.

Mental clarity and preparedness are critical to survival. The will to live in a life-and-death situation often separates those that live and those that do not. Even well-trained survival experts may be mentally affected in disaster situations. It is critical to be calm and focused during a disaster.

To the extent that stress results in hellish testing of human limits, the benefits of learning to function under stress and determining those limits may outweigh the downside of stress. There are certain strategies and mental tools that can help people cope better in a survival situation, including focusing on manageable tasks, having a Plan B available, and recognizing denial.

== Urban survival ==
=== Earthquake ===
Governments such as the United States and New Zealand advise that in an earthquake, one should "Drop, Cover, and Hold".

New Zealand Civil Defense explains it this way:

- DROP down on your hands and knees. This protects you from falling but lets you move if you need to.
- COVER your head and neck (or your entire body if possible) under a sturdy table or desk (if it is within a few steps of you). If there is no shelter nearby, cover your head and neck with your arms and hands.
- HOLD on to your shelter (or your position to protect your head and neck) until the shaking stops. If the shaking shifts your shelter around, move with it.

The United States Federal Emergency Management Agency (FEMA) adds that in the event of a building collapse, it is advised that you:

- Seek protection under a structure like a table
- Cover your mouth with your shirt to filter out dust
- Don't move until you are confident that something won't topple on you
- Use your phone light to signal for help, or call

== Important survival items ==
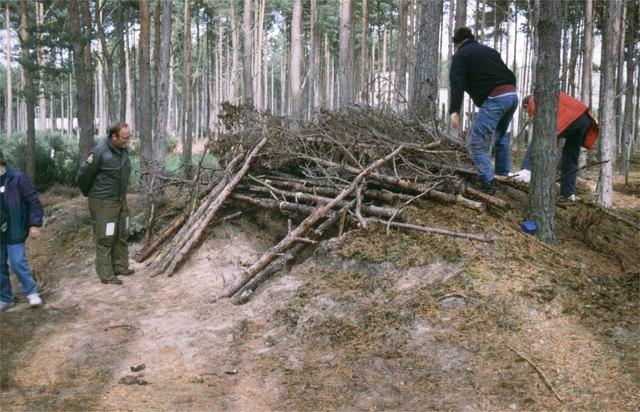
Civilian pilots attending a Survival course at RAF Kinloss learn how to construct shelter from the elements, using materials available in the woodland on the north-east edge of the aerodrome.

Survivalists often carry a "survival kit". The contents of these kits vary considerably, but generally consist of items that are necessary or useful in potential survival situations, depending on the anticipated needs and location. For wilderness survival, these kits often contain items like a knife, water vessel, fire-starting equipment, first aid equipment, tools to obtain food (such as snare wire, fish hooks, or firearms), a light source, navigational aids, and signaling or communications devices. Multi-purpose tools are often chosen because they serve multiple purposes, allowing the user to reduce weight and save space.

Preconstructed survival kits may be purchased from various retailers, or individual components may be bought and assembled into a kit.

== Controversial survival skills ==
Some survival books promote the "Universal Edibility Test". Allegedly, it is possible to distinguish edible foods from toxic ones by exposing your skin and mouth to progressively greater amounts of the food in question, with waiting periods and checks for symptoms between these exposures. However, even a small amount of some "potential foods" can cause physical discomfort, illness, or even death. Furthermore, some plants present negative symptoms only when consumed in larger doses, so this testing method may lead to intoxication in these cases.

Many mainstream survival experts have recommended the act of drinking urine in times of dehydration and malnutrition. However, the U.S. Army Survival Field Manual (FM 21–76) instructs that this technique is a myth and should never be used. There are several reasons to avoid drinking urine, including the high salt content of urine, potential contaminants, and the risk of bacterial exposure, despite urine often being touted as "sterile".

Many classic western movies, classic survival books, and even some school textbooks suggest that using your mouth to suck the venom out of a venomous snake bite is an appropriate treatment. However, venom that has entered the bloodstream cannot be sucked out, and it may be dangerous for a rescuer to attempt to do so. Similarly, some survivalists promote the belief that when bitten by a venomous snake, drinking your urine provides natural anti-venom. Effective snakebite treatment involves pressure bandages and prompt medical treatment, and may require antivenom.

== Seizonjutsu ==
Seizonjutsu (生存術) are survival skills such as gathering, hunting tracking etc. used in Ninjutsu and expertise in meteorology, botanics and training for physical strength to endure hardships in the outback.

== See also ==
- Alone (TV show)
- Bicycle touring
- Bushcraft
- Distress signal
- Hazards of outdoor recreation
- Mini survival kit
- Survivalism
- Ten Essentials
- Woodcraft
