= Firefly Gathering =

Annual primitive gathering in Western North Carolina

The Firefly Gathering is an annual "earthskills" or "primitive skills" gathering in Western North Carolina where people learn nature connection and survival skills like building a fire, identifying edible or poisonous plants, hide tanning, wooden bowl carving, archery and bow making, as well as permaculture and homesteading skills. Firefly Gathering is the largest gathering of its type in the United States.

Firefly Gathering is produced by a 501c3 nonprofit called Firefly Gathering Inc. which also organizes year around earthskills classes.

== History ==
Firefly Gathering was co-founded in 2007 by Natalie Bogwalker.

The organization became a 501c3 nonprofit in 2019.
