= Talofofo Pillbox =

- Talofofo-Talu'fofu' Pillbox
- U.S. National Register of Historic Places
- Location within Guam
- Location: S shore of Ylig river, Talofofo, Guam
- Coordinates: 13°21′56″N 144°46′3″E
- Area: less than one acre
- Built by: 10th Independent Mixed Regiment
- MPS: Japanese Coastal Defense Fortifications on Guam TR
- NRHP reference No.: 88001876
- Added to NRHP: March 4, 1991

The Talofofo Pillbox is a historic World War II-era defensive fortification in Talofofo, Guam. It is located near the coast, about 127 metres (417 ft) south of the mouth of the Togcha River and 27 metres (89 ft) inland from the high-tide line. It is roughly 2.75 by 3.0 metres (9.0 ft × 9.8 ft), built out of concrete and coral limestone. Its walls are about 0.5 metres (1.6 ft) thick, with an embrasure providing a view of the Togcha River, and a window looking over the coast to the east. Its entrance is on the landward (south) side. This structure was built under the direction of the Imperial Japanese Army during its occupation of Guam in 1941–44.

The pillbox was listed on the National Register of Historic Places in 1991.

== See also ==
- National Register of Historic Places listings in Guam
