= Kizugawa Maru =

World War II-era Japanese freighter ship

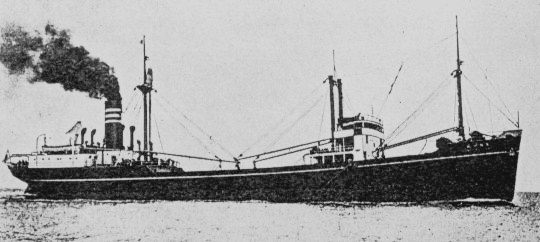
- Kizugawa Maru, seen pre-war

History

Empire of Japan
- Name: Kizugawa Maru
- Builder: Kawaminami, Nagasaki
- Launched: May 11, 1941
- Completed: July 1941
- Identification: Official Number 48643
- Fate: Scuttled in Apra Harbor, Guam, June 27, 1944

General characteristics
- Class & type: WWII Standard D-class ship (jpn.) class
- Tonnage: 1,915 GRT
- Length: 82.8 metres (272 ft)
- Beam: 12.2 metres (40 ft)
- Draft: 6.2 metres (20 ft)
- Propulsion: steam, 1 x 3-cyl. triple expansion engine, single shaft, 1 screw
- Speed: 13 knots (24 km/h)
- Armament: 1 x 8cm/40 deck gun, 1 x single 25mm Type 96 gun, 2 x single 13mm Type 93 MGs, 1 x 7,7mm MG, 5 rifles, 2 depth charges, 1 hydrophone

Wreck of Kizugawa Maru
- Location: Piti, Guam, USA
- Waterbody: Apra Harbor
- Nearest land: Cabras Island
- Dive type: Deep, Wreck
- Depth range: 65 to 140 ft (20 to 43 m)
- Average visibility: 10 to 20 m (33 to 66 ft)
- Entry type: Boat
- Bottom composition: Metal, silt
- Water: Salt

Kizugawa Maru (Japanese: 木津川丸, きづがわまる), or Kitsugawa Maru^{α}, is a World War II-era Japanese water tanker sunk in Apra Harbor, Guam. Damaged by a submarine torpedo attack off Guam on April 8, 1944, she was towed into port for repairs. In port, she was further damaged in three separate U.S. air attacks during the Mariana and Palau Islands campaign. Deemed irreparable, Kizugawa Maru was scuttled by shore guns on June 27, 1944. The shipwreck is now a deep recreational diving site.

== History ==
On April 8, 1944, she was part of a supply convoy from Saipan to the garrison at Woleai, when she was damaged in the port engine room by a torpedo attack by USS Seahorse about 47 kilometres (29 mi) off the eastern coast of Guam at 13°16′N 145°11′E. She was then towed to Apra Harbor for repairs by the destroyer Minazuki . Thirty-seven of her sailors were killed in the attack. In the same attack, Seahorse fatally damaged the munitions transport Aratama Maru, which grounded itself in Talofofo Bay. At the time, Guam was occupied by the Japanese after being captured from the U.S. in 1941.

During the U.S. Mariana and Palau Islands campaign, Kizugawa Maru was further damaged during an air raid on 11 April, and again on 11 and 27 June. Declared beyond repair after the raid on the 27 June, she was scuttled by shore gunfire. Due to her engine room flooding quickly, she sank straight down and sits upright in northern Apra Harbor. About 80% intact, the wreck has an 8 cm/40 3rd Year Type naval gun on her bow with three or four boxes of ammunition. In 2007, researchers noted a large concrete block had crashed through the bow deck structure, apparently due to an mooring accident.

== Dive site ==
Kizugawa Maru is a deep recreational diving site, sometimes referred to as the Kitz. She is lauded as an "excellent wreck dive" and a rival to "any that can be found on Truk." The top of Kizugawa Maru's mast is at 60 feet (18 m), while the bow gun sits at 100 feet (30 m). Damage from six bombs is at 130 feet (40 m), with the silt bottom of the harbor at 140 feet (43 m). Due to the depth, recreational divers use Nitrox or are severely limited on the time available at the gun or deck in order to avoid incurring a decompression obligation. Trained wreck divers considering penetration are further cautioned about plentiful silt, as well as twisted metal around the engine room and holds. In October 2023, a large vessel anchored on or near the Kitzugawa Maru, ripping the deck gun off of the deck, knocking the mast off and damaging the bow. The gun now sits in 137 feet of water, upside down, in the silt on her port side.

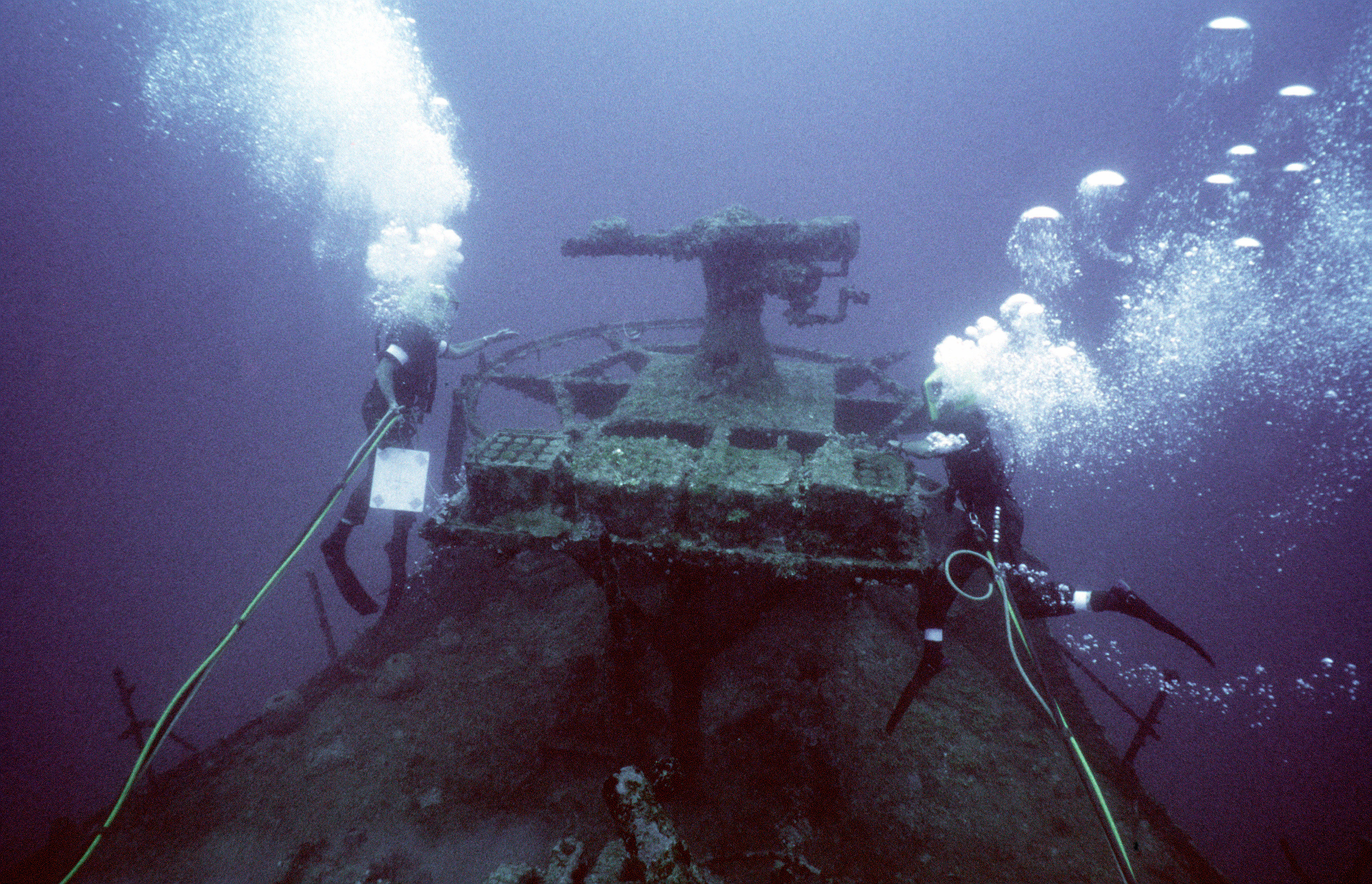
U.S. Navy divers measuring the deck gun in 1987 as part of Project Sea Mark for Navy historic sites

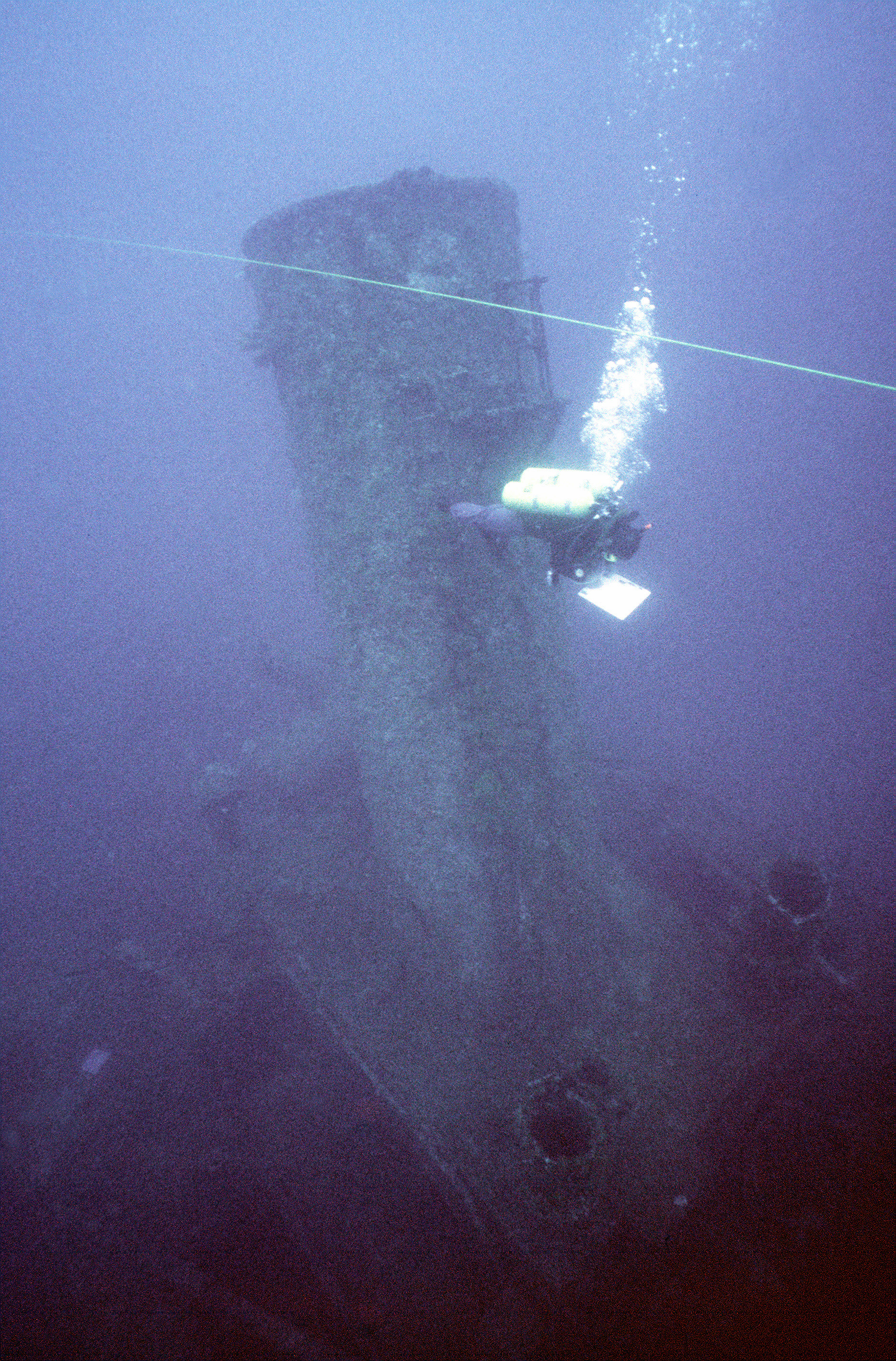
Navy diver and survey line at the stack in 1987

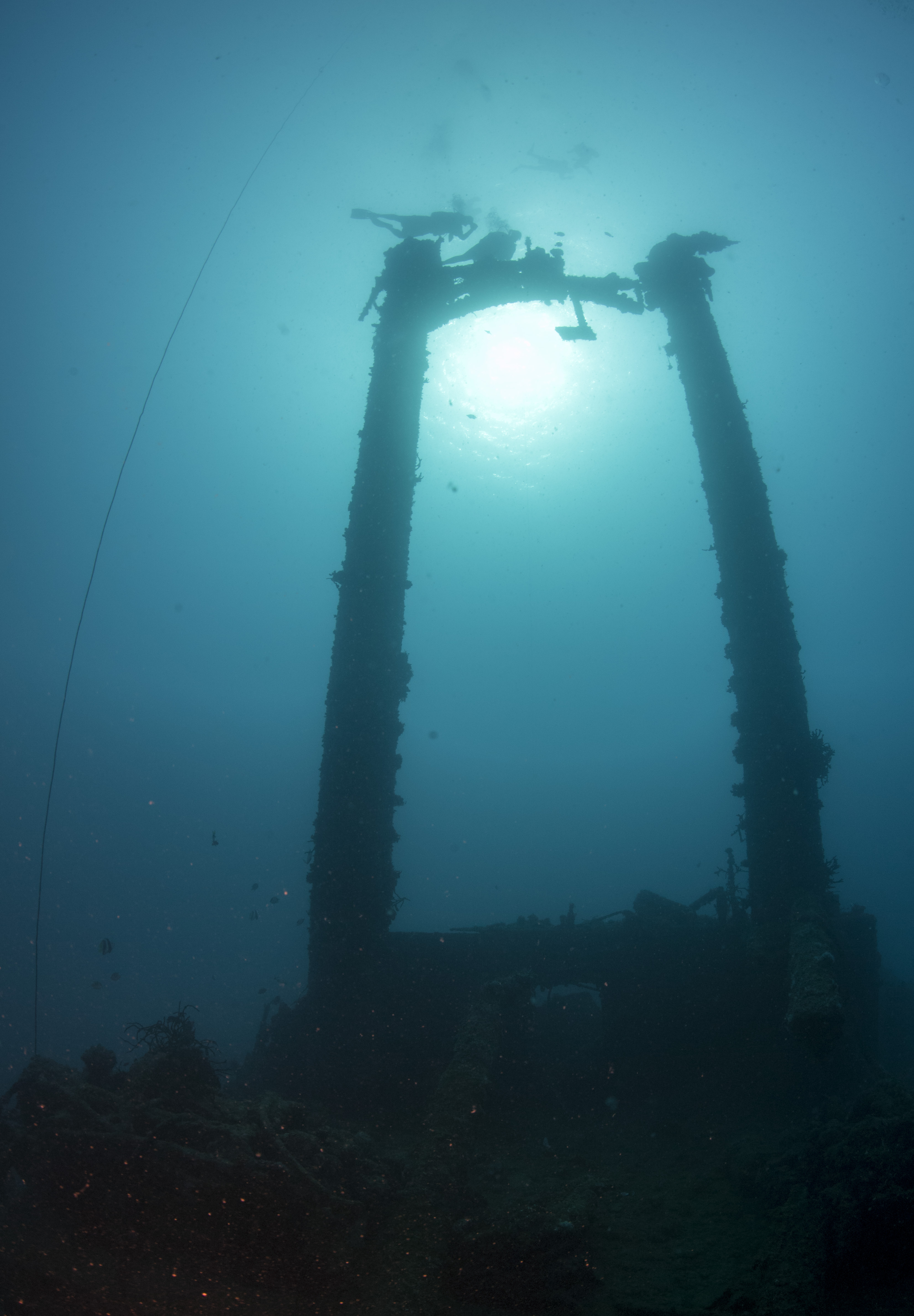
The mast of Kizugawa Maru from the deck

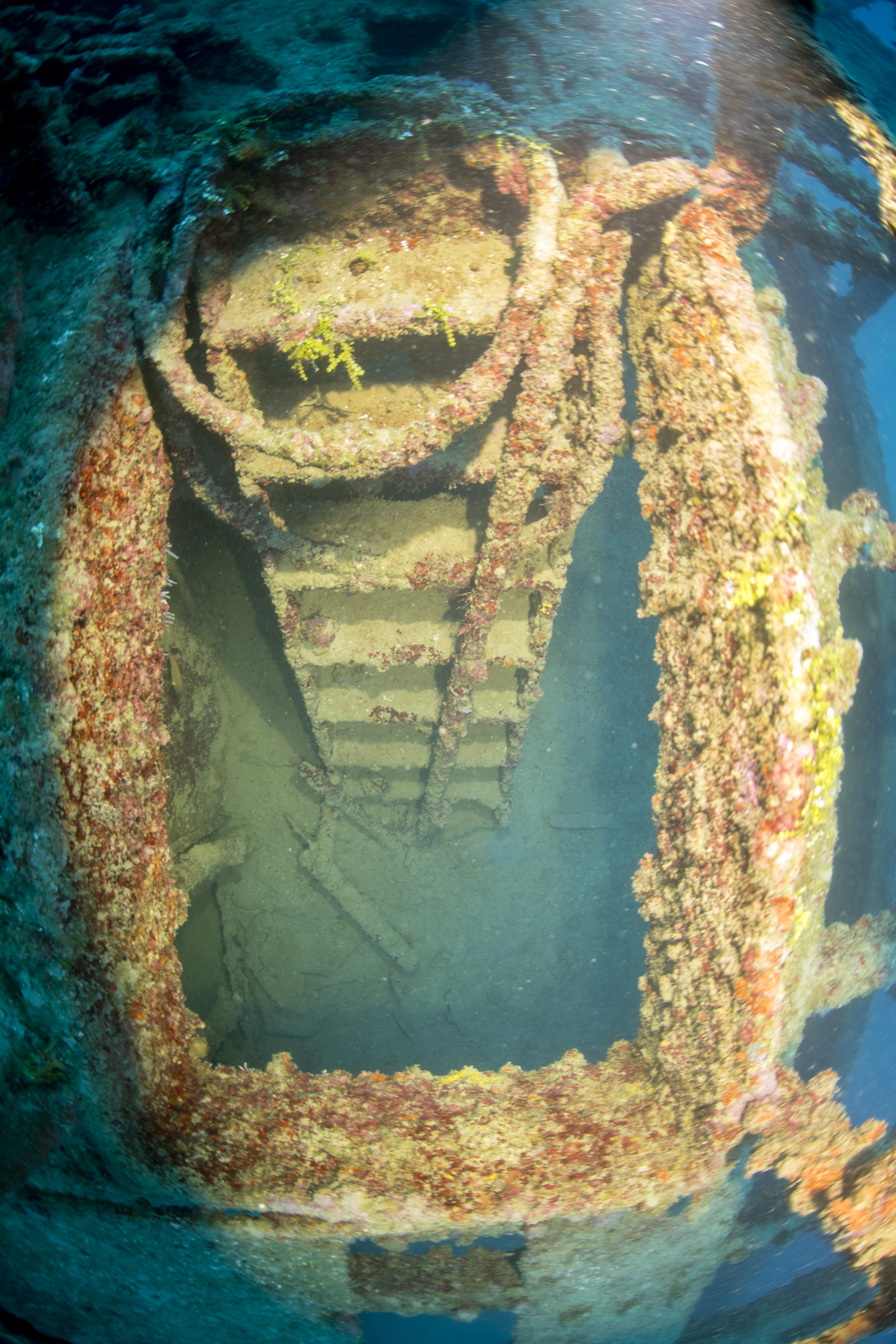
Ship ladder in 2018

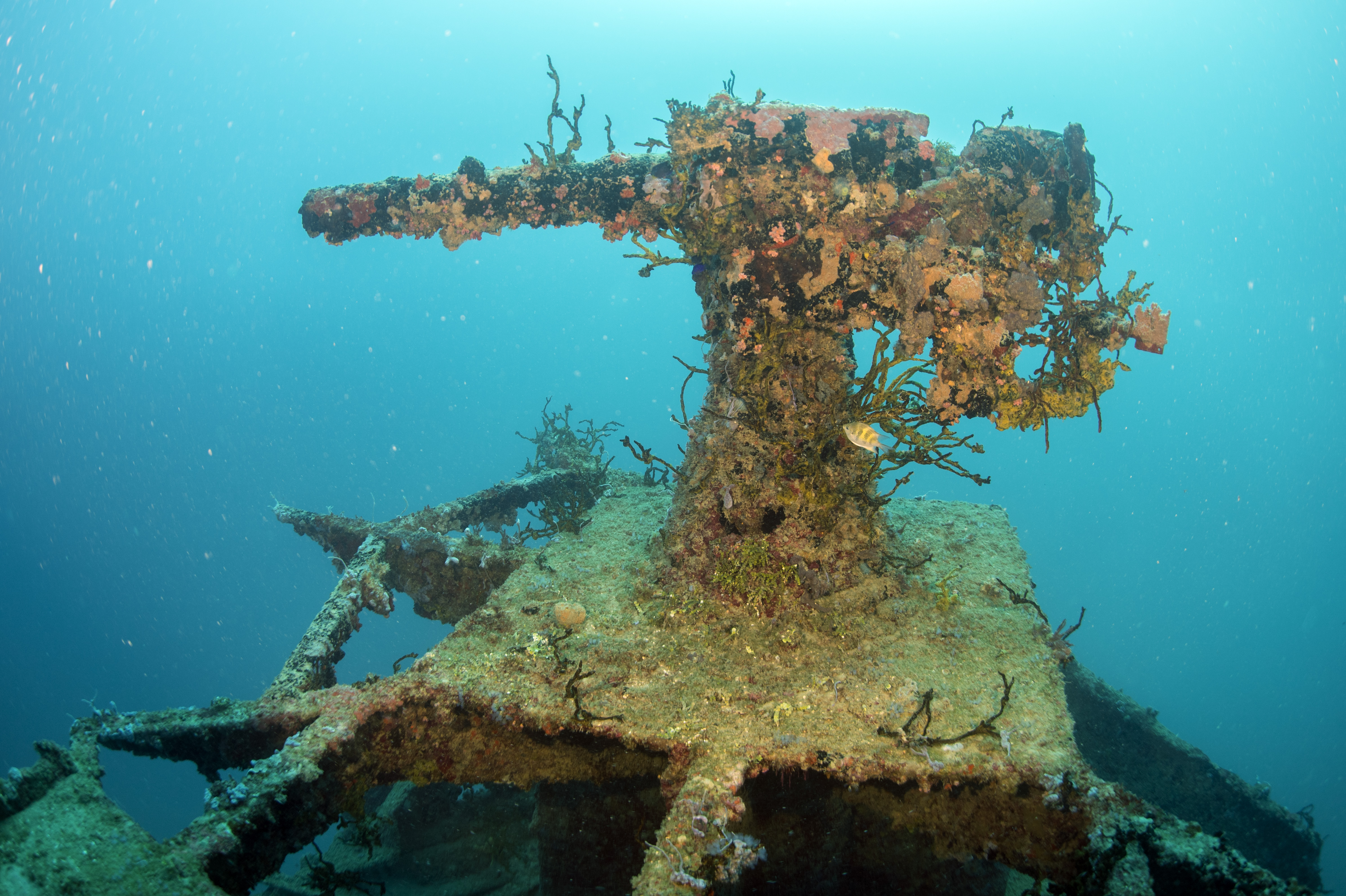
The 8 cm/40 3rd Year Type naval gun on her bow

== See also ==
- Media related to Kizugawa Maru (ship, 1941) at Wikimedia Commons
- Underwater diving on Guam
