= SS304 =

SS304 may refer to:

- The Balao-submarine USS Seahorse (SS-304)
- The grade 304 stainless steel family of SAE steel grades
