= Tokcha' Pillbox =

- U.S. National Register of Historic Places
- Location within Guam
- Location: Toghca Point shoreline, Ipan, Guam
- Coordinates: 13°22′18″N 144°46′9″E
- Area: less than one acre
- Built by: 10th Independent Mixed Regiment
- MPS: Japanese Coastal Defense Fortifications on Guam TR
- NRHP reference No.: 88001875
- Added to NRHP: March 4, 1991

The Tokcha' Pillbox is a Japanese-built World War II-era defensive fortification on the island of Guam. It is built on a limestone terrace on Togcha Point, about 1 mile (1.6 km) north of the Togcha River and 0.7 miles (1.1 km) south of the Ylig River. It is set in a depression excavated from the limestone about 15 metres (49 ft) inland from the high tide land and 1 metre (3.3 ft) above sea level. It is a roughly rectangular structure built out of steel-reinforced concrete filled with coral and beach aggregate. The entrance is on the north wall, sheltered by a wall of coral blocks, and the gun port is on the south wall. This structure was built under the direction of the Japanese military during their occupation of the island 1941–44.

The pillbox was listed on the National Register of Historic Places in 1991.

== See also ==
- National Register of Historic Places listings in Guam
