= Mana Pillbox =

- U.S. National Register of Historic Places
- Location within Guam
- Location: S shore of As Anite Cove, Talofofo, Guam
- Coordinates: 13°20′24″N 144°46′12″E
- Area: less than one acre
- Built by: 10th Independent Mixed Regiment
- MPS: Japanese Coastal Defense Fortifications on Guam TR
- NRHP reference No.: 88001886
- Added to NRHP: March 4, 1991

The Mana Pillbox is an old World War II-era Japanese-built defensive fortification on the east coast of the island of Guam. It is located south of the village of Talofofo, about 50 metres (160 ft) inland from the point marking the south end of As Anite Cove. It is a structure built out of coral limestone and concrete, with an interior chamber about 3 by 1.8 metres (9.8 ft × 5.9 ft) in size. The entrance is on the south side, measuring 0.85 by 1.45 metres (2.8 ft × 4.8 ft). There is one gun port, facing north, measuring 0.32 by .9 metres (1.0 ft × 3.0 ft). The structure was designed to be well hidden in view from the sea and air. It was built, probably by conscripted Chamorro labor, during the Japanese occupation period 1941–44.

The structure was listed on the National Register of Historic Places in 1991.

== See also ==
- National Register of Historic Places listings in Guam
