= Aratama Maru =

Japanese munitions transport ship sunk at Guam

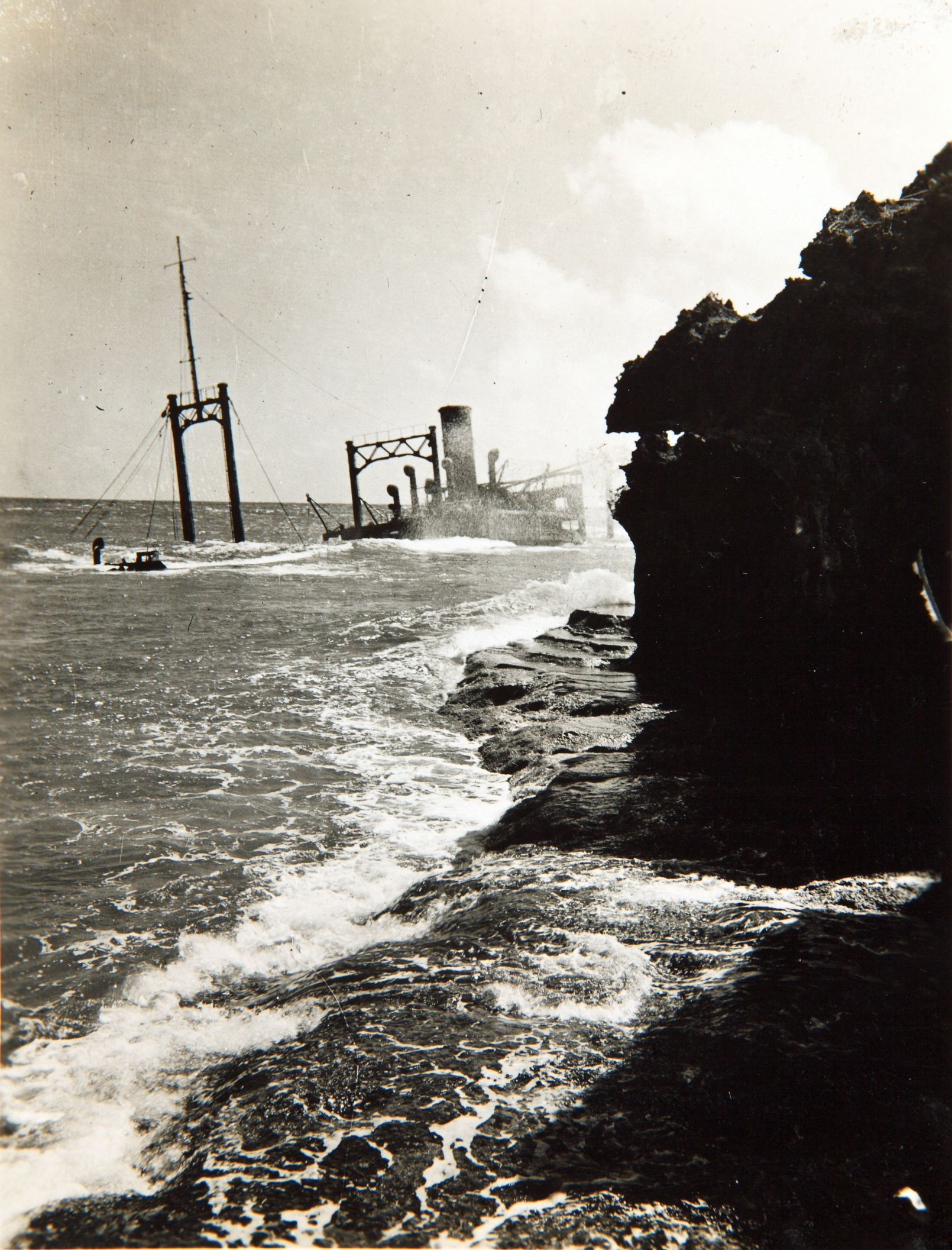
- Aratama Maru in Talofofo Bay, sometime from 1944 to 1947

History

Empire of Japan
- Name: Aratama Maru
- Builder: Tsurumi Steel Shipyard, Japan
- Launched: 1938
- Fate: Torpedoed by USS Seahorse, April 8, 1944, hull sank in Talofofo Bay, Guam, April 12, 1944

General characteristics
- Tonnage: 6,784 GRT
- Length: 136.1 m (447 ft)
- Draft: 8.2 m (26 ft 11 in)
- Propulsion: 1x DR geared steam turbine, single shaft, 1 screw
- Speed: 13 knots (24 km/h; 15 mph)
- Aratama Maru
- U.S. National Register of Historic Places
- Location within Guam
- Location: Talofofo Bay
- Nearest city: Talofofo, Guam
- Coordinates: 13°20′5″N 144°46′2″E
- NRHP reference No.: 88000612
- Added to NRHP: June 2. 1988

Aratama Maru (Kanji:新玉丸) was a merchant ship of the Empire of Japan. Launched in 1938, she was pressed into service as a munitions transport in World War II. She was struck by a torpedo fired from USS Seahorse on April 8, 1944, while approaching Guam as part of a Japanese ammunition resupply convoy. Engulfed in flames, her crew abandoned her and were picked up by an escort vessel. After drifting for three days, the abandoned hull came to rest just inside the reef fringing Talofofo Bay on Guam's southeastern coast. While resting on the reef she split in half with the stern of the ship drifting off the reef toward the Mariana Trench. The wreck was partially salvaged shortly afterward and was further salvaged in the 1960s, leaving only the hull remnants, the anchor with chain, and some elements of its superstructure. It has also been the subject of souvenir diving, and its position and condition have been affected by several typhoons. Seahorse damaged Kizugawa Maru in the same attack, which was towed into Apra Harbor for repairs and during a second American bombing attack was sunk where she remains today.

The shipwreck was listed on the National Register of Historic Places in 1988.

== See also ==
- National Register of Historic Places listings in Guam
