= Malessu' Pillbox =

- U.S. National Register of Historic Places
- Location within Guam
- Location: Talona Beach on Cocos Lagoon, Malesso', Guam
- Coordinates: 13°15′34″N 144°40′20″E
- Area: less than one acre
- Built by: 10th Independent Mixed Regiment
- MPS: Japanese Coastal Defense Fortifications on Guam TR
- NRHP reference No.: 88001872
- Added to NRHP: March 4, 1991

The Malessu' Pillbox is a World War II-era Japanese-built defensive fortification on the shore of Malesso', Guam. Located about 15 metres (49 ft) from the high-tide line at Merizo Beach, it is a rectangular structure built of steel-reinforced concrete and basalt rock. It is 3.9 metres (13 ft) deep, 2.4 metres (7.9 ft) wide, and about 2.42 metres (7.9 ft) high, although only about 0.75 metres (2.5 ft) of the structure is visible above ground. Its gun port has a view of the Merizo pier, and is approximately at ground level. It was built by Japanese defenders during their occupation of the island 1941–44.

The structure was listed on the National Register of Historic Places in 1991.

== See also ==
- National Register of Historic Places listings in Guam
