= Japanese transport ship Gyoun Maru (1890) =

Auxiliary transport of the Imperial Japanese Navy during World War II

History

Empire of Japan
- Name: Gyoun Maru
- Builder: Fleming & Ferguson, Paisley, Renfrewshire, Scotland
- Yard number: 148
- Launched: 8 April 1890
- Sponsored by: J & A Brown, Newcastle, New South Wales, Australia
- Completed: June 1890
- Acquired: 28 December 1942, seized by the Imperial Japanese Navy
- Identification: 94114
- Notes: Call sign: WNVS (British); Call sign: JLHR (Japan)

General characteristics
- Type: Cargo ship
- Tonnage: 912 GRT
- Length: 67.06 m (220 ft 0 in) o/a
- Beam: 9.45 m (31 ft 0 in)
- Draught: 4 m (13 ft 1 in)
- Installed power: 170 nhp
- Propulsion: 2 x 2 cyl Compound expansion engines, dual shaft, 2 screws, steam

Gyoun Maru (Japanese: 曉雲丸) was an auxiliary transport of the Imperial Japanese Navy during World War II.

== History ==
She was launched on 8 April 1890 and completed in June 1890 at the Paisley, Renfrewshire shipyard of Fleming & Ferguson for J & A Brown of Australia and christened SS Duckenfield. She was registered in Newcastle, New South Wales, and was used as a 'sixty-miler' collier.

In 1933, Moller & Company of Shanghai, which operated numerous shipping companies (the Moller Line, Trader Line Ltd., British China Steamship Co, and Zodiac Shipping), purchased her and renamed her SS Ethel Moller. In 1935, she was converted as a salvage vessel for Moller´s Towages Ltd. On 25 November 1942, she was scuttled at Hong Kong to prevent seizure by the Japanese, but on 28 December 1942, the Imperial Japanese Navy seized, re-floated, and repaired her; they renamed her Gyoun Maru.

On 3 July 1944, she was part of Convoy No. 91 en route from Takao to Hong Kong consisting of three other transport/cargo ships and two escorts (the Momi-class destroyer Kuri and the Chidori-class torpedo boat Hatsukari). The US submarine USS Seahorse torpedoed and sank the transport Nitto Maru and the cargo ship Gyoyu Maru (the ex-British Joan Moller) and then soon after midnight on the 4th, the cargo ship, Kyodo Maru No. 28. Gyoun Maru and its two escorts, were able to reach Hong Kong without further incident on 5 July.

On 12 October 1944, aircraft from Task Force 38, bombed and sank her off Takao at 22°37′N 119°34′E. Other ships sunk in the attack were transports Bujo Maru and Joshu Maru; Imperial Japanese Army cargo ship Yamahagi Maru; merchant cargo ships Hakko Maru, Tenjin Maru No. 11 and Takatomi Maru No. 1; merchant tankers Nanshin Maru No. 5, Nanshin Maru No. 11, and Nanshin Maru No. 20; and dredger Niitaka Maru. Ships damaged were tanker Eiho Maru; army cargo ship Shinto Maru; Teisho Maru (ex-German Havenstein); and cargo ships Taisho Maru and Taihoku Maru.
