= Ilik River Fortification II =

- U.S. National Register of Historic Places
- Location within Guam
- Location: Shore of Ylig Point, Yona, Guam
- Coordinates: 13°23′14″N 144°46′23″E
- Area: less than one acre
- Built by: 10th Independent Mixed Regiment
- MPS: Japanese Coastal Defense Fortifications on Guam TR
- NRHP reference No.: 88001871
- Added to NRHP: March 4, 1991

The Ilik River Fortification II near Yona, Guam was built by Japanese forces during World War II. It was listed on the U.S. National Register of Historic Places in 1991.

It is a pillbox located about 100 meters from an entrance to Ylig Bay, 30 meters inland from the high tide line, and about 50 meters above sea level. The fortification consists of three partial sides of a structure made of coral pieces cemented together, a construction technique introduced to the island during its colonial Spanish administration. The surviving wall segments range in thickness from 0.7 metres (2.3 ft) to 0.9 metres (3.0 ft) in thickness, and there is a gun port in the south-facing wall.

== See also ==
- National Register of Historic Places listings in Guam
