= Yokoi's Cave =

US Registered Historic Place on Guam

- U.S. National Register of Historic Places
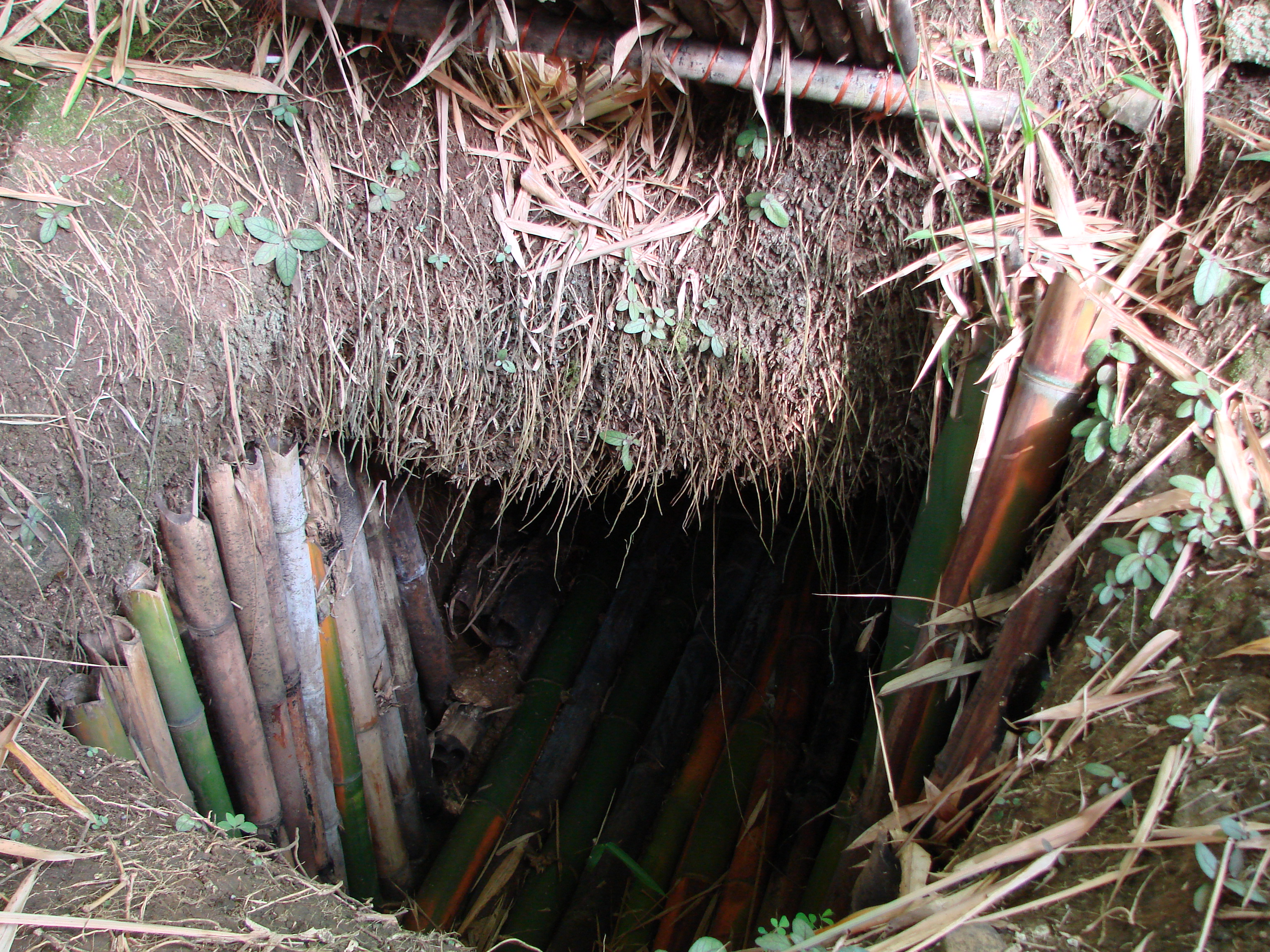
- Recreation of the cave at Talofofo Falls
- Location: Address restricted
- Nearest city: Talofofo, Guam
- Area: 1 acre (0.40 ha)
- Built: 1944
- NRHP reference No.: 80004244
- Added to NRHP: January 16, 1980

Yokoi's Cave is the cave on the island of Guam in which Imperial Japanese Army Sergeant Shoichi Yokoi hid until he was discovered in 1972. Yokoi and several companions hid in the area for more than 25 years (since Japan's defeat in the 1944 Battle of Guam), two of them died in the cave; their remains were found in the cave after Yokoi's surrender. The original cave was destroyed by a typhoon, so a replica was created near the original cave. The replica bears the same name as the original cave, and is a tourist attraction in Talofofo Falls Resort Park in the village of Talofofo.

The original cave was listed on the National Register of Historic Places in 1980.

== See also ==
- National Register of Historic Places listings in Guam
