= Ipan, Guam =

Coordinates: 13.3537427°N 144.7672571°E

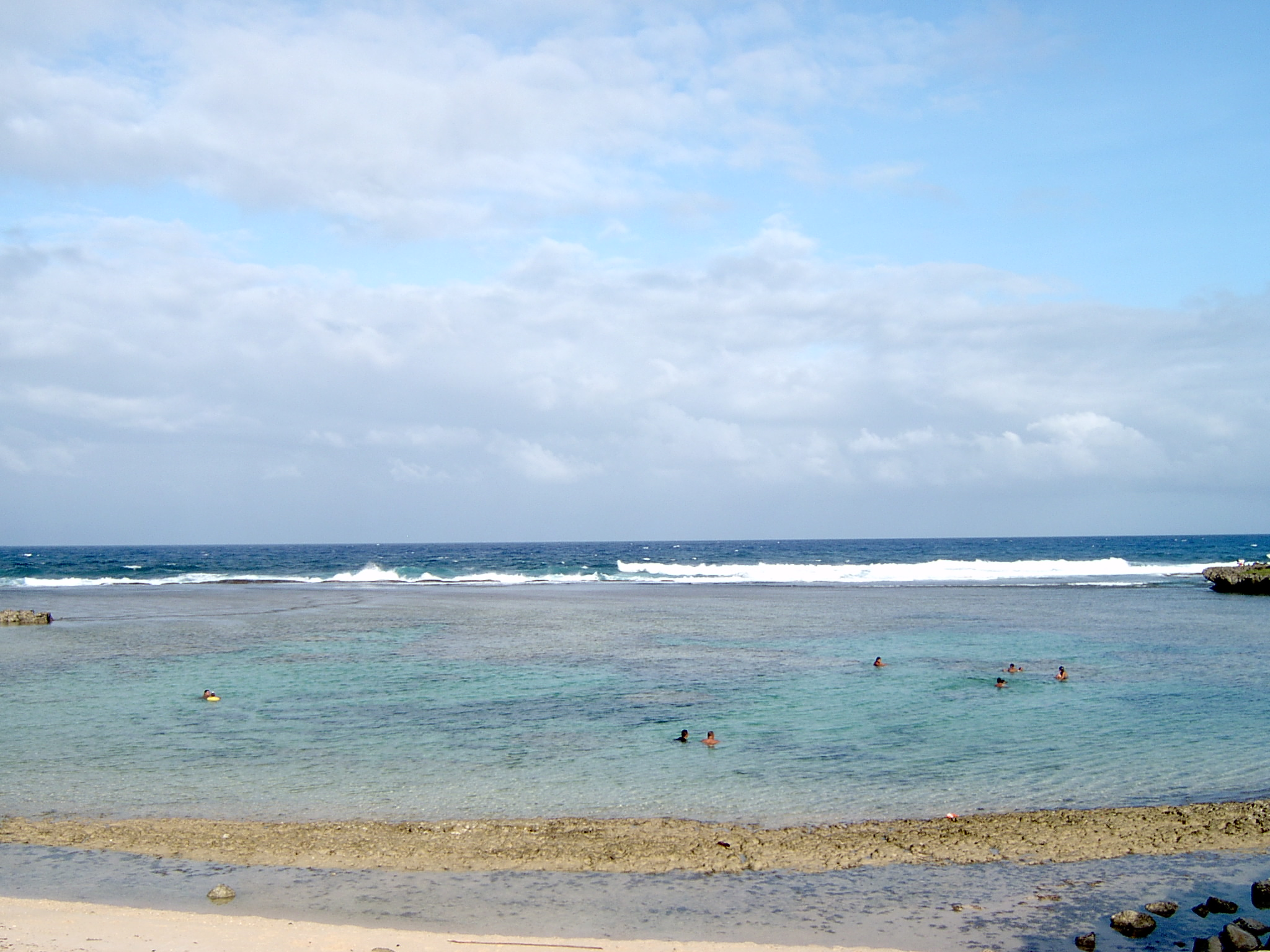
First Beach in Ipan

Ipan is a census-designated place in the village of Talofofo on the east coast of the United States territory of Guam. Located north of Talofofo Bay, Ipan is a rural beachside community facing the Pacific Ocean, with Ipan Park being a popular site for family barbecues and parties. The community contains one restaurant: Jeff's Pirates Cove.

After World War II, Camp Dealy was constructed in Ipan and served as a recreational area for military personnel. Today, all that remains of the camp are the remnants of concrete structures along the beach.

Ipan is also the site of the Pangelinan Quarry which provides high quality limestone aggregate used in the concrete of many of Guam's utility poles. The area is accessible by Route 4, a two-lane road.
