= USS Seahorse (SS-304) =

Submarine of the United States

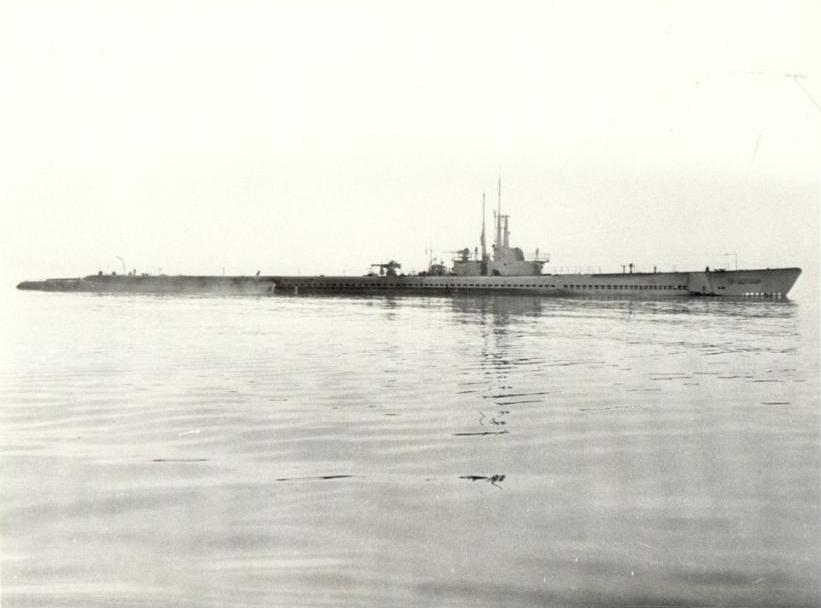
- USS Seahorse underway post-1943 in the Pacific Ocean

History

United States
- Name: Seahorse
- Builder: Mare Island Naval Shipyard
- Laid down: 1 July 1942
- Launched: 9 January 1943
- Commissioned: 31 March 1943
- Decommissioned: 2 March 1946
- Stricken: 1 March 1967
- Fate: Sold for scrap, 4 December 1968

General characteristics
- Class & type: Balao-class diesel-electric submarine
- Displacement: 1,526 long tons (1,550 t) surfaced; 2,424 long tons (2,463 t) submerged
- Length: 311 ft 10 in (95.05 m)
- Beam: 27 ft 4 in (8.33 m)
- Draft: 16 ft 10 in (5.13 m) maximum
- Propulsion: 4 × Fairbanks-Morse Model 38D8-1/8 9-cylinder opposed-piston diesel engines driving electrical generators; 2 × 126-cell Sargo batteries; 4 × high-speed Elliott electric motors with reduction gears; 2 × propellers; 5,400 shp (4.0 MW) surfaced; 2,740 shp (2.04 MW) submerged
- Speed: 20.25 knots (38 km/h) surfaced; 8.75 knots (16 km/h) submerged
- Range: 11,000 nautical miles (20,000 km) surfaced at 10 knots (19 km/h)
- Endurance: 48 hours at 2 knots (3.7 km/h) submerged; 75 days on patrol
- Test depth: 400 ft (120 m)
- Complement: 10 officers, 70–71 enlisted
- Armament: 10 × 21-inch (533 mm) torpedo tubes; 6 forward, 4 aft; 24 torpedoes; 1 × 5-inch (127 mm) / 25 caliber deck gun; Bofors 40 mm and Oerlikon 20 mm cannon

USS Seahorse (SS-304), a Balao-class submarine, was the first submarine and second ship of the United States Navy to be named for the seahorse, a small fish whose head and the fore part of its body suggest the head and neck of a horse.

Seahorse was laid down on 1 August 1942 by the Mare Island Navy Yard, Vallejo, California. The vessel was launched on 9 January 1943, sponsored by Mrs. Chester C. Smith, and commissioned on 31 March 1943.

== First war patrol, August – September 1943 ==
Following shakedown along the California coast, Seahorse sailed to Pearl Harbor, Territory of Hawaii and, on 3 August 1943, got underway for her maiden war patrol, conducted off the Palau Islands. On the morning of 29 August, while the submarine was gaining attack position on a Japanese convoy, she was detected by escorting destroyers and suffered minor damage from a depth charge attack.

Seahorse scored three torpedo hits on a transport on 6 September, and then went deep to evade a depth charge attack that caused severe leaks and put her number four torpedo tube out of commission. A week later, she expended eight torpedoes in an unsuccessful attempt to sink a large tanker. The submarine terminated her first patrol at Midway on 27 September.

During this patrol, Seahorse's commanding officer ignored several potential targets, rather than face sonar-equipped escorts, which unrealistic prewar training indicated was virtual suicide.

== Second war patrol, October – December 1943 ==
Following refit, Seahorse sailed on 20 October for her second war patrol with her new skipper, Slade Cutter, the executive officer of the first patrol. Between 29 October and 31 October, the submarine sank three enemy trawlers in surface actions and then commenced a two-day attack on a 17-ship convoy. Early on the morning of 2 November, following an attack on the convoy by another United States submarine, Seahorse evaded three escort ships and launched three torpedoes into two freighters. Four hours later, she again attacked, sending three torpedoes toward a tanker and another spread at a third freighter. Flames burst from each target as two Japanese destroyers turned toward Seahorse but too late to catch the rapidly departing submarine. Sunk in this action were the 7,089-ton cargo ship Chihaya Maru, and the 5,859-ton cargo ship, Ume Maru. Seahorse later closed again on the convoy but was driven down by depth charges and departed the vicinity.

On 22 November, Seahorse maneuvered past three enemy escorts, launched four torpedoes from periscope depth, and sank the cargo ship, Daishu Maru. On 26 November, the submarine contacted another enemy convoy and began to close the range. Determined to mount an attack before the targets entered the mined Tsushima Strait, the submarine launched four torpedoes at long range quickly sinking a cargo ship; and then, dodging enemy escorts, let go four stern shots at a second target. The results seemed disappointing—until a sudden blast sent flames and debris mushrooming high into the air, completely destroying the 7,309-ton tanker, San Ramon Maru.

Seahorse expended the last of her torpedoes on the night of 30 November and 1 December. After maneuvering for several hours, the submarine was finally able to fire her stern tubes at an enemy convoy. However, one torpedo exploded just after it left the tube, and the entire convoy opened fire on the vicinity of the submarine. With so many explosions around her, it was impossible for Seahorse to determine whether any torpedoes had hit. Low on fuel and out of torpedoes, the submarine returned to Pearl Harbor on 12 December from a successful second patrol, with four ships and three trawlers sunk.

== Third war patrol, January – February 1944 ==
Seahorse departed Pearl Harbor on 6 January 1944 for her third war patrol. On 16 January, while en route to the Palaus, she evaded four escorts and destroyed the 784-ton cargo ship, Nikkō Maru, with three torpedo hits. She spent 21 January tracking two enemy cargo ships in company with three escorts. In the late evening, she pressed home four consecutive attacks to sink the 3,025-ton cargo ship, Yasukuni Maru, and the 3,156-ton passenger-cargo ship, Ikoma Maru.

On the evening of 28 January, Seahorse began an 80-hour chase of an enemy convoy off the Palaus. After being continually harassed by escorts and aircraft throughout the next day, Seahorse launched three torpedoes at the cargo ship, Toko Maru. After the sinking, the submarine lost contact with the convoy for several hours, but again had it in sight at dawn on 31 January.

Early on the morning of 1 February, Seahorse launched four torpedoes for no hits followed by two more, again without result. With the crew exhausted from the extended chase, the submarine fired her final two torpedoes and headed for deeper water. After evading the escorts, she surfaced in time to see the results of her latest attack as the cargo ship, Toei Maru, slipped beneath the waves. Seahorse terminated her third patrol at Pearl Harbor on 16 February.

== Fourth war patrol, March – May 1944 ==
Seahorse's fourth war patrol was conducted in the Mariana Islands. She departed Pearl Harbor on 16 March 1944 and intercepted a large Japanese convoy on 8 April. After nightfall, the submarine launched four torpedoes at overlapping targets, sinking the converted seaplane tender Aratama Maru. Shortly thereafter, her second spread of torpedoes damaged the cargo ship Kizugawa Maru, which subsequently was towed to Apra Harbor on Guam for repairs. Although a counterattack by escorting destroyers drove Seahorse from the vicinity, she quickly regained contact and continued the chase into the following day, sinking the cargo ship Mimasaka Maru.

Seahorse took up a lifeguard station for the carrier airstrikes on Saipan that commenced on 12 April 1944. Some sources credit her with sinking the Japanese submarine Ro-45 west of Saipan on 20 April 1944, but Ro-45 was active after that date and apparently instead was sunk south of Truk Atoll on 30 April 1944 by the destroyers USS MacDonough (DD-351) and USS Stephen Potter (DD-538). However, in the same vicinity as her supposed sinking of Ro-45, Seahorse sank the 5,244-ton cargo ship Akigawa Maru on 27 April 1944.

On 29 April 1944, a U.S. Navy PB4Y-1 Liberator patrol bomber of Bombing Squadron 109 (VB-109) mistook Seahorse for a Japanese submarine and attacked her off Satawan southeast of Truk Atoll while she was on lifeguard duty, dropping two bombs as Seahorse crash-dived. Seahorse suffered a damaged antenna, but no other damage and no casualties. Seahorse departed her lifeguard station on 3 May to refuel at Milne Bay, New Guinea, and arrived at Brisbane, Australia, on 11 May.

== Fifth and sixth war patrols, June – October 1944 ==
Seahorse put to sea for her fifth war patrol on 11 June 1944, patrolling between Formosa and Luzon. On the morning of 27 June, she sank the tanker, Medan Maru, and damaged two other enemy vessels. On 3 July, close to midnight, she spotted convoy No. 91 en route from Takao to Hong Kong consisting of four transport/cargo ships and two escorts (the Momi-class destroyer Kuri and the Chidori-class torpedo boat Hatsukari). She torpedoed and sank the transport Nitto Maru and the cargo ship Gyoyu Maru (the ex-British Joan Moller) and then soon after midnight on the 4th, she expended the last of her torpedoes and sank the cargo ship, Kyodo Maru No. 28. The convoy's only remaining transport, Gyoun Maru (the ex-British Ethel Moller), and its two escorts, were able to reach Hong Kong without further incident on 5 July. On 19 July Seahorse returned to Pearl Harbor.

Seahorse spent the first part of her sixth war patrol supporting the capture of the Palaus and then headed for the Luzon Strait. Despite intensive efforts, the submarine could locate only one worthwhile target, Coast Defense Vessel No. 21, a frigate of 800 tons, which she sank. Five days later, Seahorse took up lifeguard station for the carrier airstrike on northern Luzon and then returned to Midway on 18 October.

== Seventh and eighth war patrols, March – August 1945 ==
Upon completion of an overhaul at Mare Island Navy Yard, Seahorse put to sea on 9 March 1945 for her seventh war patrol. Following patrol in the Tsushima Strait, she sank a small junk with gunfire on 8 April. On 18 April, an attack by two patrol boats (CD-14 and CD-132) left the submarine's interior a shambles of broken glass, smashed instruments, and spilled hydraulic oil. Seahorse made hasty repairs and headed for Apra Harbor, Guam, and then to Pearl Harbor for overhaul.

Seahorse put to sea for her eighth and final war patrol on 12 July. When hostilities ceased on 15 August, the submarine was on station 40 miles (64 km) southeast of Hachijō-jima.

Following her return to Midway, Seahorse sailed for Mare Island where she was decommissioned on 2 March 1946. She was assigned to the Pacific Reserve Fleet and remained inactive for the remainder of her career. She was reclassified an auxiliary submarine, AGSS-304, on 6 November 1962, struck from the Navy list on 1 March 1967, and sold on 14 December 1968 to Zidell Explorations Inc., Portland, Oregon, for scrapping.

Seahorse (SS-304) received nine battle stars for World War II service.

== See also ==
- List of most successful American submarines in World War II
