= Shoichi Yokoi =

Japanese World War II holdout (1915–1997)

Shōichi Yokoi
- 横井 庄一
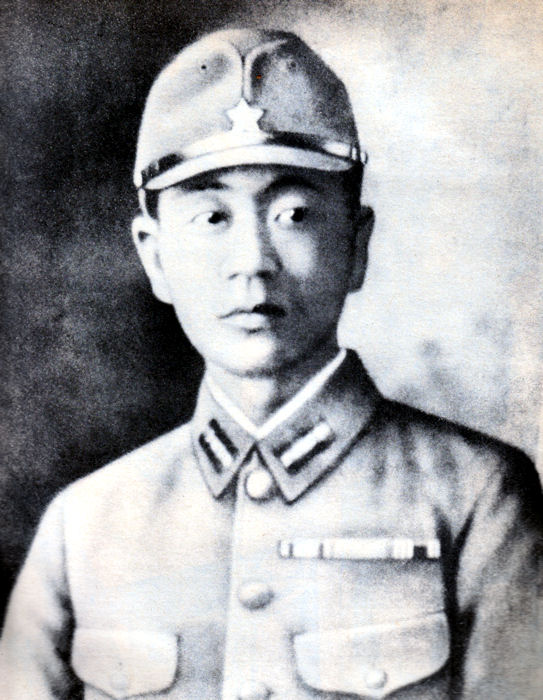
- Born: 31 March 1915; Saori, Aichi, Japan
- Died: 22 September 1997 (aged 82); Nagoya, Japan
- Military career
- Allegiance: Empire of Japan
- Branch: Imperial Japanese Army
- Service years: 1941–1972
- Rank: Sergeant
- Units: 29th Infantry Division; 38th Regiment
- Conflicts: World War II; Second Battle of Guam

Shōichi Yokoi (横井 庄一, Yokoi Shōichi; 31 March 1915 – 22 September 1997) was a Japanese soldier who served as a sergeant in the Imperial Japanese Army during World War II, becoming one of the last four Japanese holdouts to be found after the end of hostilities in 1945. He was discovered in the jungles of Guam on 24 January 1972, almost 28 years after U.S. forces had regained control of the island in 1944.

== Biography ==
Yokoi was born in Saori, Aichi Prefecture, Japan. He was an apprentice tailor when he was conscripted in 1941.

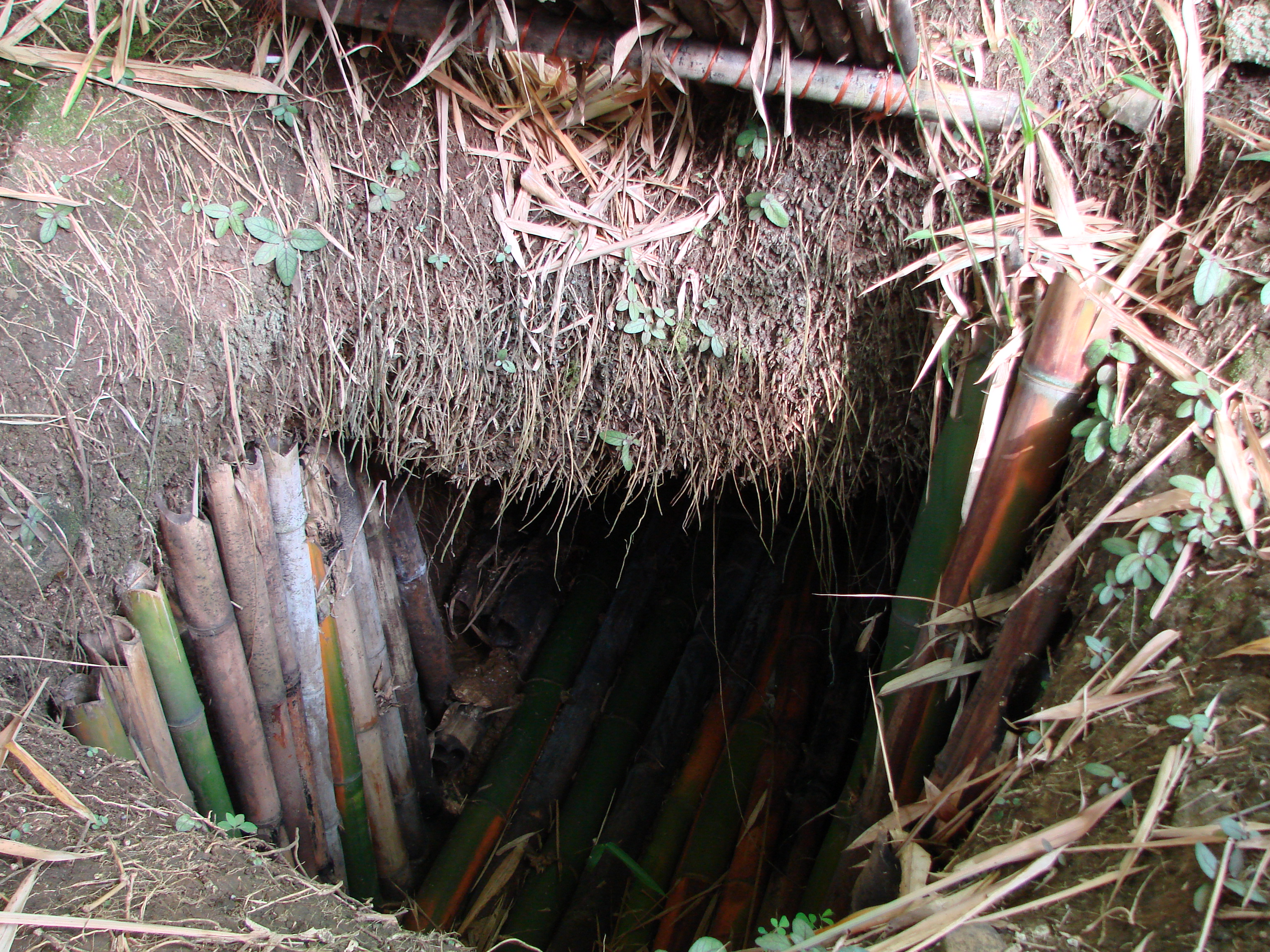
"Yokoi's Cave", a tourist attraction created on the site of the original cave, which was destroyed in a typhoon

Initially, Yokoi served with the 29th Infantry Division in Manchukuo. In 1943, he was transferred to the 38th Regiment in the Mariana Islands and arrived on Guam in February 1943. When American forces captured the island in the 1944 Battle of Guam, Yokoi went into hiding with nine other Japanese soldiers. Seven of the original ten eventually moved away and only three remained in the region. These men separated, but visited each other periodically until about 1964, when the other two died in a flood. For the last eight years before his discovery, Yokoi lived alone. He survived by hunting, primarily at night. He also used native plants to make clothes, bedding, and storage implements, which he carefully hid in his cave.

On the evening of 24 January 1972, Yokoi was discovered by two local men (Manuel Tolentino De Garcia and Jesus Mantanoña Duenas) checking shrimp traps along a small river on Talofofo. They had assumed Yokoi was a villager from Talofofo, but he thought his life was in danger and attacked them. They managed to subdue him and carried him out of the jungle.

Yokoi later said that he expected the local men to kill him at first but was surprised when instead they allowed him to eat hot soup at their home before turning him over to the authorities. He was in relatively good health, but slightly anemic due to a lack of salt in his diet, according to doctors at Guam Memorial Hospital. His diet included wild nuts, mangos, papaya, shrimp, snails, frogs, and rats.

"It is with much embarrassment that I return", he said upon his return to Japan in March 1972. The remark quickly became a popular saying in Japan. He had known since 1952 that World War II had ended, but feared coming out of hiding, explaining: "We Japanese soldiers were told to prefer death to the disgrace of getting captured alive."

This newspaper photograph depicts what was described as Yokoi's first haircut in 28 years.

After a whirlwind media tour of Japan, Yokoi married and settled down in rural Aichi Prefecture. He became a popular television personality and an advocate of simple living. He was featured in a 1977 documentary film called Yokoi and His Twenty-Eight Years of Secret Life on Guam. He eventually received the equivalent of US$300 in back pay, and a small pension. Although he never met Emperor Shōwa, while visiting the grounds of the Imperial Palace, Yokoi said, "Your Majesties, I have returned home ... I deeply regret that I could not serve you well. The world has certainly changed, but my determination to serve you will never change."

Yokoi died in 1997 of a heart attack at the age of 82.

The Shoichi Yokoi Memorial Hall opened in 2006 in Nakagawa-ku, Nagoya, and closed in 2022 after the death of Yokoi's wife, Mihoko, who had served as its director.

== See also ==
- Hiroo Onoda, among the last three Japanese holdouts to be found after the war; he was discovered in March 1974, Lubang Island, Philippines
- Teruo Nakamura, the last known Japanese holdout to surrender; he was discovered in December 1974, Morotai Island, Indonesia
