= Talofofo Bay =

Bay in Guam

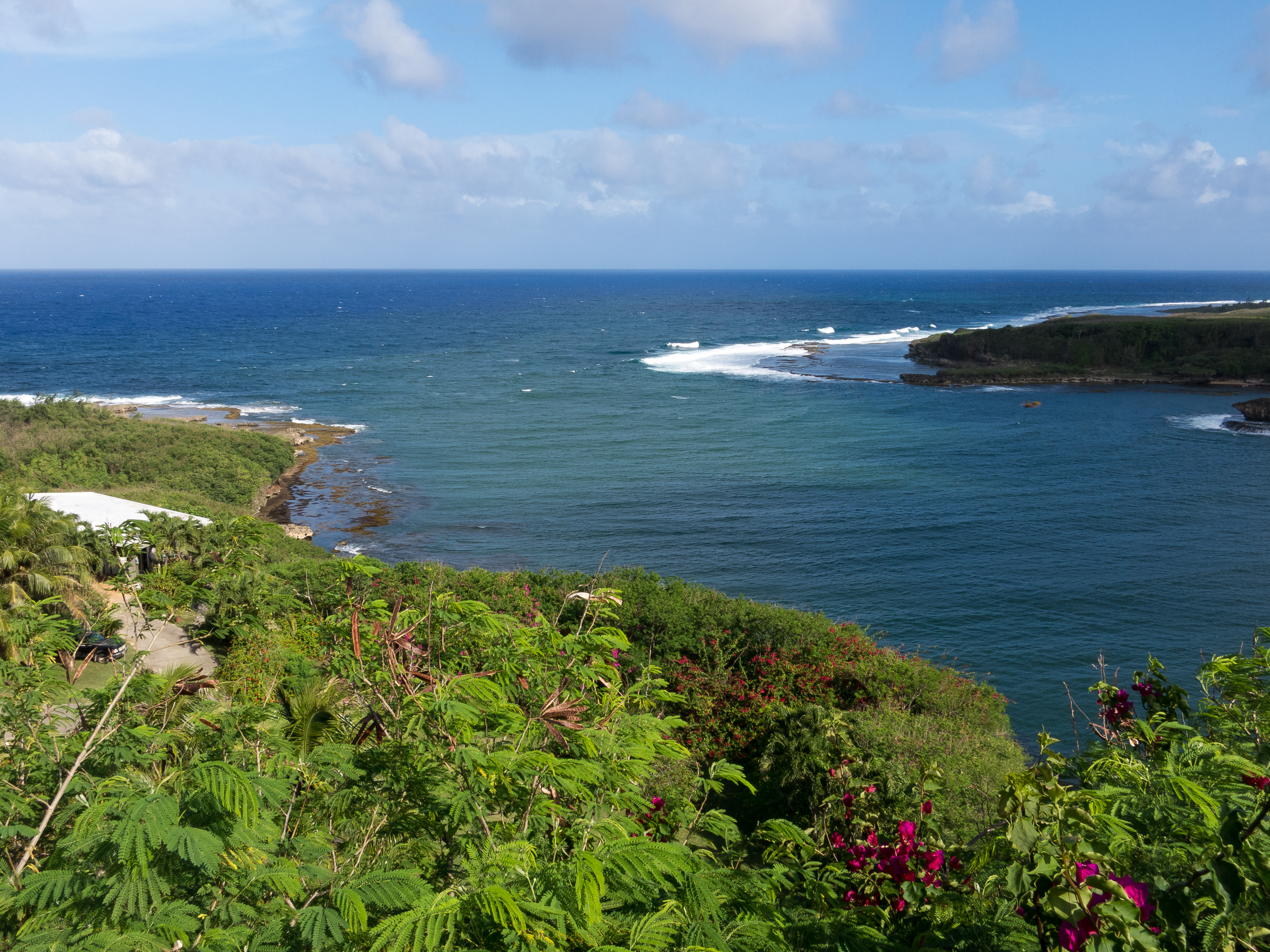
- Talofofo Bay from the north

- Location within Guam
- Location: Talo'fo'fo
- Coordinates: 13.338°N 144.766°E
- Primary inflows: Talofofo River
- Ocean/sea sources: Pacific Ocean

Talofofo Bay is an inlet in the south-eastern coast of the island of Guam at the mouth of the Talofofo River in the village of Talo'fo'fo.

Talofofo Bay is notable for being one of the most accessible brown sand beaches of Guam. This brown sand is the deposition from silt and sand from the Talofofo River, which provides a strong visual contrast from the white sand composed of ground coralline limestone found on most of the island. This bay is at the mouth of the largest and longest river on Guam, Talofofo River. This area is known to have hammerhead sharks, turtles, and other aquatic sea life. Due to the low lying cliffs that lead into the ocean, sharks are able to nest their eggs in the side rock pockets of the bay.

Talofofo Bay is the site of the World War II shipwreck of the Aratama Maru, a Japanese freighter. Locals sometimes call this location "Surfside," the wave sets, or "Talirajan," due to it being between Talo'fo'fo and Inalåhan (formerly Inarajan).

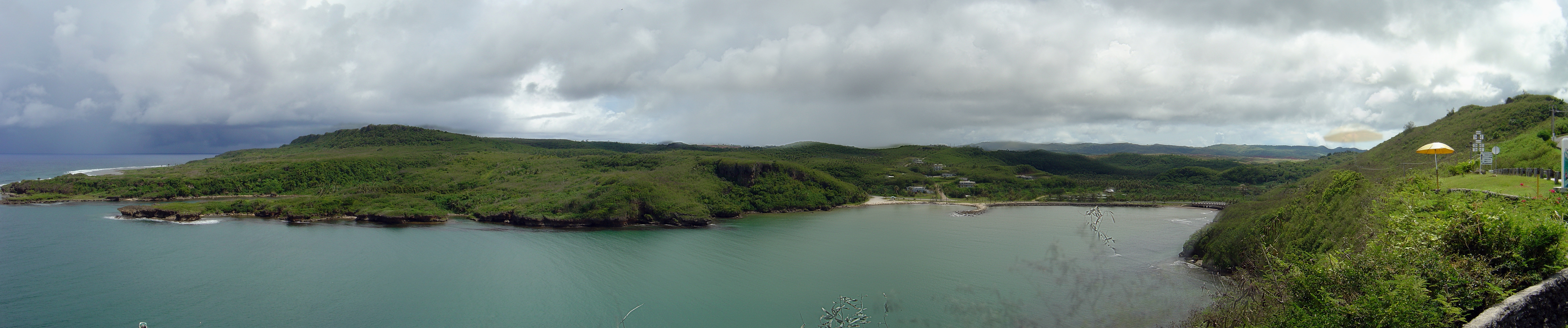
From viewpoint
