= Talo'fo'fo, Guam =

Coordinates: 13°21′06″N 144°45′11″E

Talo'fo'fo
- Village
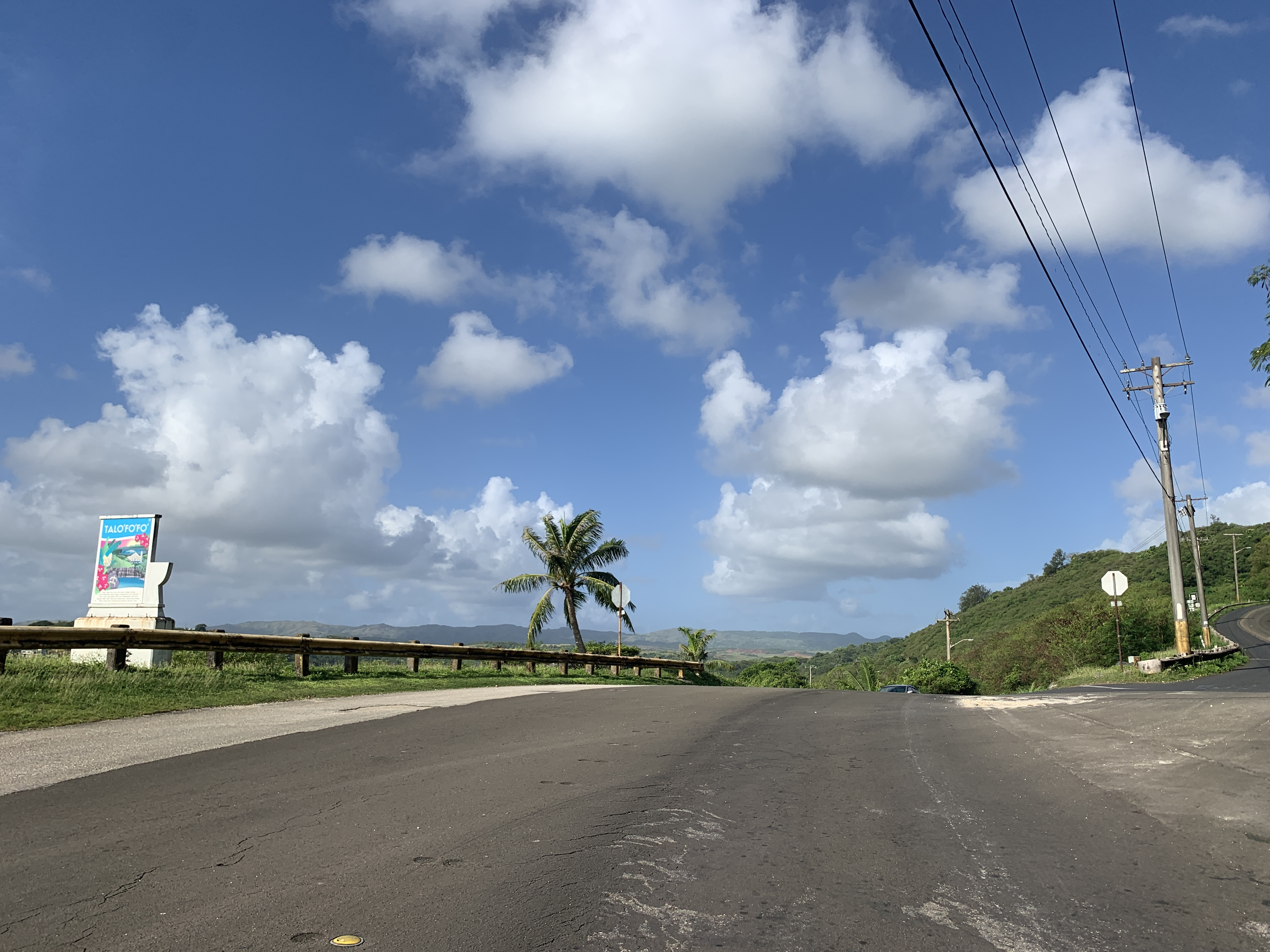

- Location of Talo'fo'fo within the Territory of Guam.
- Country: United States
- Territory: Guam

Government
  - Mayor: Vicente S. Taitague (D)

Population (2020)
  - Total: 3,550
- Time zone: UTC+10 (ChST)

Historical population
Census	Pop.	Note	%±
1960	1,352		—
1970	1,935		43.1%
1980	2,006		3.7%
1990	2,310		15.2%
2000	3,215		39.2%
2010	3,050		−5.1%
2020	3,550		16.4%

Talo'fo'fo, formerly known as Talofofo, is a village located in the southern part of the United States territory of Guam, on the east coast. The village center is located in the hills above the coast, while the smaller coastal community below the cliff is known as Ipan.

The village contains two golf courses. Other tourist attractions include Jeff's Pirate's Cove Restaurant and Museum, Talofofo Caves, Talofofo Falls Resort Park, Ipan Beach Resort and a Talofofo River boat cruise to an ancient Chamorro village. Japanese holdout from World War II Shoichi Yokoi was discovered by Jesus Duenas and Manuel DeGracia near Talo'fo'fo on January 24, 1972. A recreation of his hide out cave is included at the Talofofo Falls Resort Park.

On August 18, 2021, the municipality place name was officially changed from Talofofo to Talo'fo'fo'.

The village is located south of Yona and north of Inarajan.

== Demographics ==
The U.S. Census Bureau counts the following census-designated places in the municipality: Talofofo, and Ipan.

== Education ==
Guam Public School System serves the island. Talofofo Elementary School serves elementary school students. Southern High School in Santa Rita serves the village.

In regards to the Department of Defense Education Activity (DoDEA), Talo'fo'fo is in the school transportation zone for McCool Elementary and McCool Middle School, while Guam High School is the island's sole DoDEA high school.

Notre Dame High School, a Catholic high school, is in Talo'fo'fo.

== Government ==
Mayor of Talo'fo'fo
Name	Party	Term begin	Term end
Roman L.G. Quinata	Republican	January 1, 1973	January 5, 1981
Tito A. Mantanona	Republican	January 5, 1981	January 6, 1997
Vicente S. Taitague (1st Term)	Democratic	January 6, 1997	January 1, 2001
Anthony D. Leon Guerrero	Democratic	January 1, 2001	January 3, 2005
Pedro "Pete" D. Paulino	Republican	January 3, 2005	January 5, 2009
Vicente S. Taitague (2nd Term)	Democratic	January 5, 2009	present

== Gallery ==
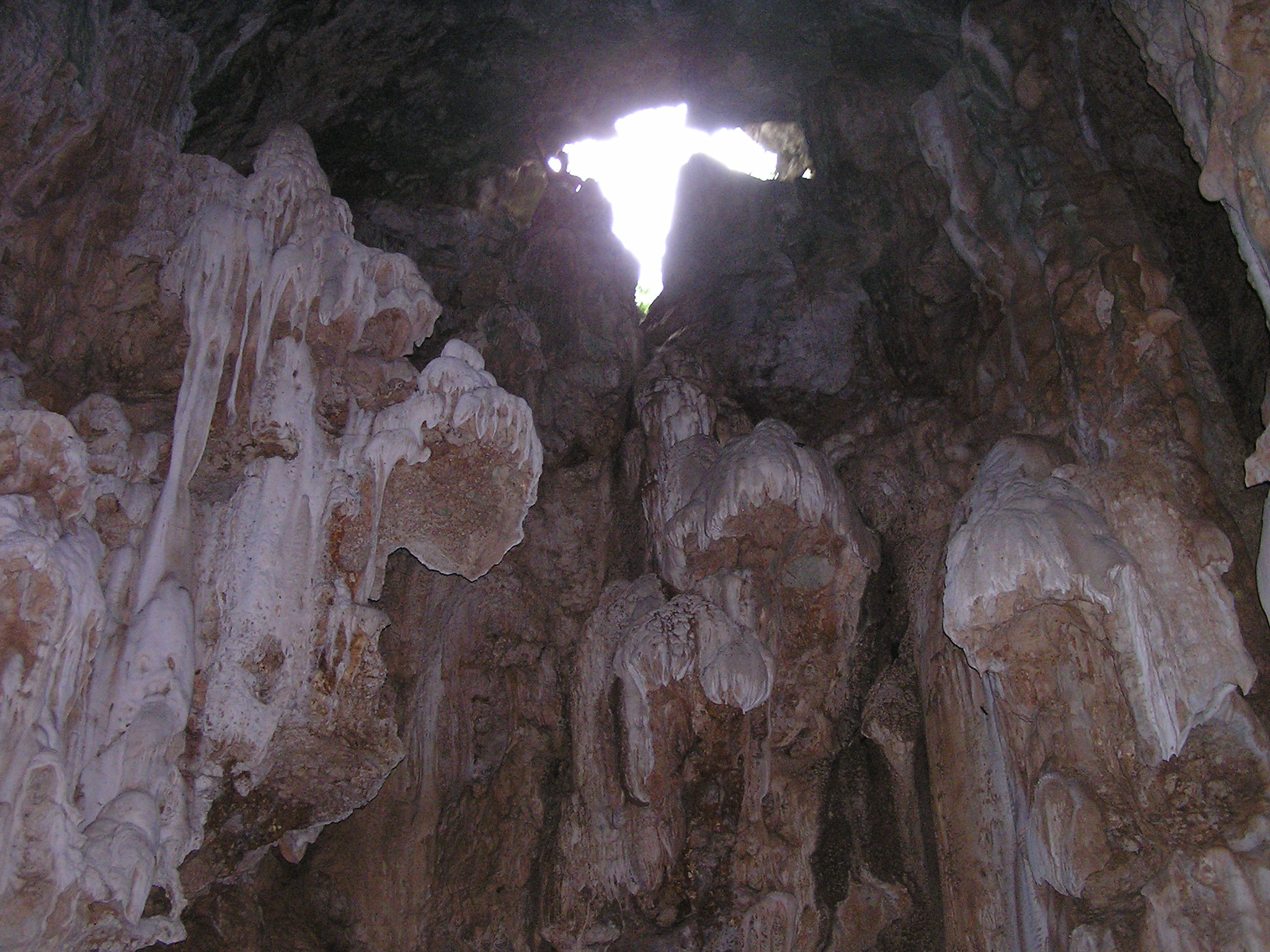
Talofofo Caves

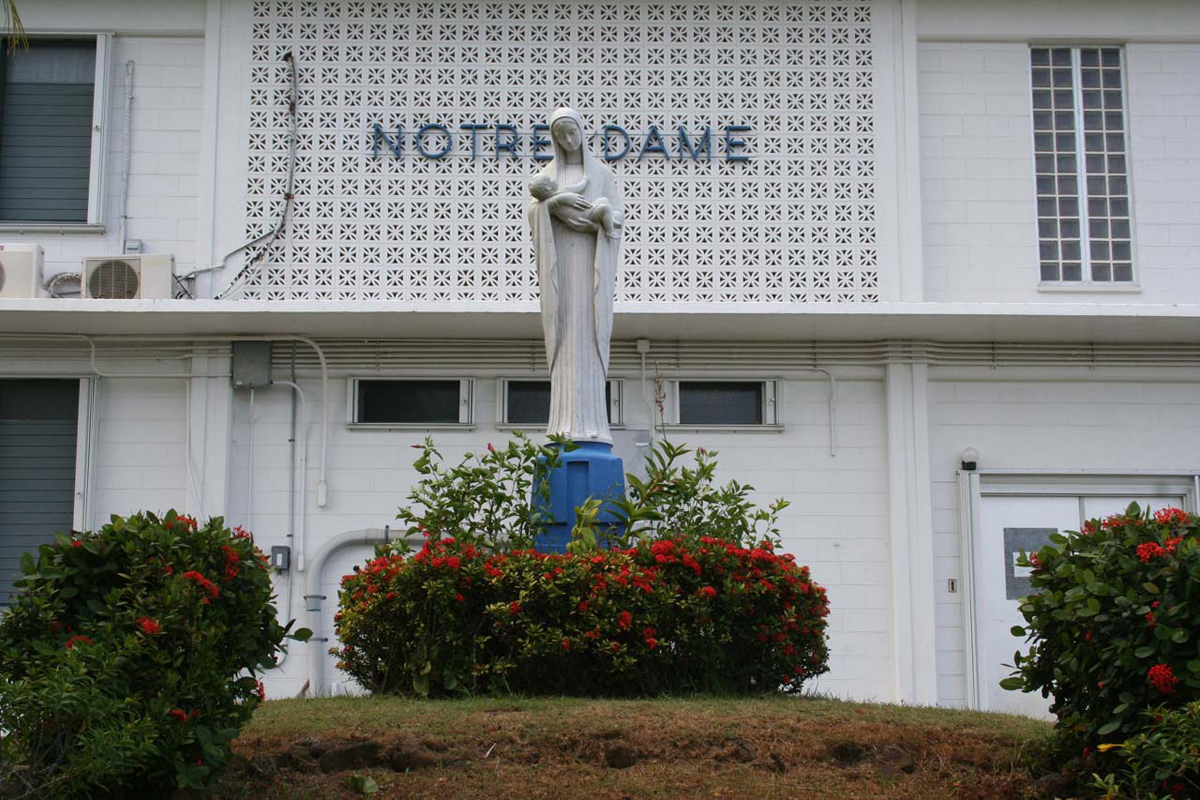
Notre Dame High School

== See also ==
- Villages of Guam
