= Typhoon Sinlaku (2026) =

Pacific typhoon in 2026

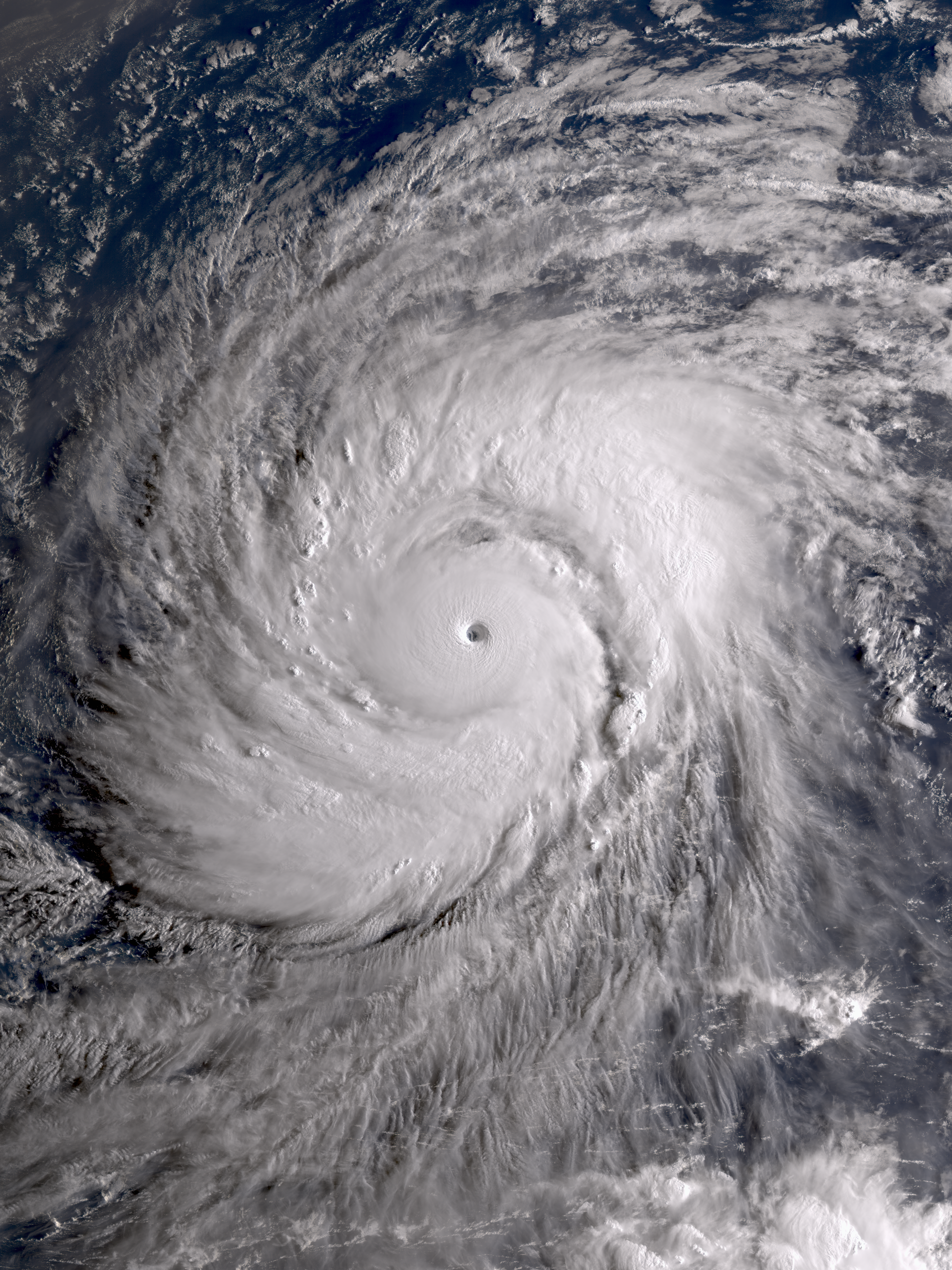
- Sinlaku at its peak intensity southeast of Guam on April 12

Meteorological history
- Formed: April 7, 2026
- Extratropical: April 20, 2026
- Dissipated: April 22, 2026

Violent typhoon
- 10-minute sustained (JMA)
- Highest winds: 215 km/h (130 mph)
- Lowest pressure: 905 hPa (mbar); 26.72 inHg

Category 5-equivalent super typhoon
- 1-minute sustained (SSHWS/JTWC)
- Highest winds: 295 km/h (185 mph)
- Lowest pressure: 890 hPa (mbar); 26.28 inHg

Overall effects
- Fatalities: 17
- Injuries: 5
- Missing: 1
- Damage: >$1.55 billion (2026 USD)
- Areas affected: Micronesia; Northern Mariana Islands; Guam; Saipan
- Part of the 2026 Pacific typhoon season

Typhoon Sinlaku (Note: The name Sinlaku (Kosraean: Sinlackuh, [sinlɛkʌ]) was contributed by the Federated States of Micronesia and refers to the goddess of nature and breadfruit of Kosrae.) was an extremely powerful and long-lived tropical cyclone that affected the Mariana Islands in mid-April 2026, causing widespread damage on the island of Saipan. It is the strongest tropical cyclone in the Northern Hemisphere to form in April since Typhoon Surigae in 2021, and the second strongest storm in the Western Pacific Basin, only behind Bavi and Champi, which tie for the season's strongest storm.

The fourth named storm, first typhoon, and first violent typhoon of the 2026 Pacific typhoon season, Sinlaku originated from a disturbance first identified by the Joint Typhoon Warning Center (JTWC) west-southwest of Chuuk on April 8. The system gradually organized and was upgraded to a tropical storm by the Japan Meteorological Agency (JMA) early on April 10, before intensifying into a typhoon later that day as it moved steadily north westward. Highly favorable conditions enabled rapid intensification on April 11, during which a well-defined eye developed. Sinlaku reached its peak intensity on April 12; the JMA estimated ten-minute maximum sustained winds of 215 km/h (130 mph) and a minimum pressure of 905 hPa (26.72 inHg), while the JTWC estimated one-minute maximum sustained winds of 295 km/h (185 mph) and a minimum pressure of 890 hPa (26.28 inHg), which is equivalent to a Category 5 super typhoon. After reaching peak intensity, Sinlaku began to weaken gradually as it approached the Mariana Islands due to an eyewall replacement cycle, before making landfall on Saipan on April 14 as a strong typhoon. The storm subsequently slowed down while moving away from the island chain and continued to weaken amid less favorable conditions.

Prior to the storm's landfall, Guam declared a state of emergency on April 10. Typhoon watches, warnings, and the opening of emergency shelters were implemented. The typhoon has left 43,000 people in the Mariana Islands without power since it began. Damage was widespread as a result, and twelve people were confirmed dead due to the storm in Micronesia and the Mariana Islands.

== Meteorological history ==
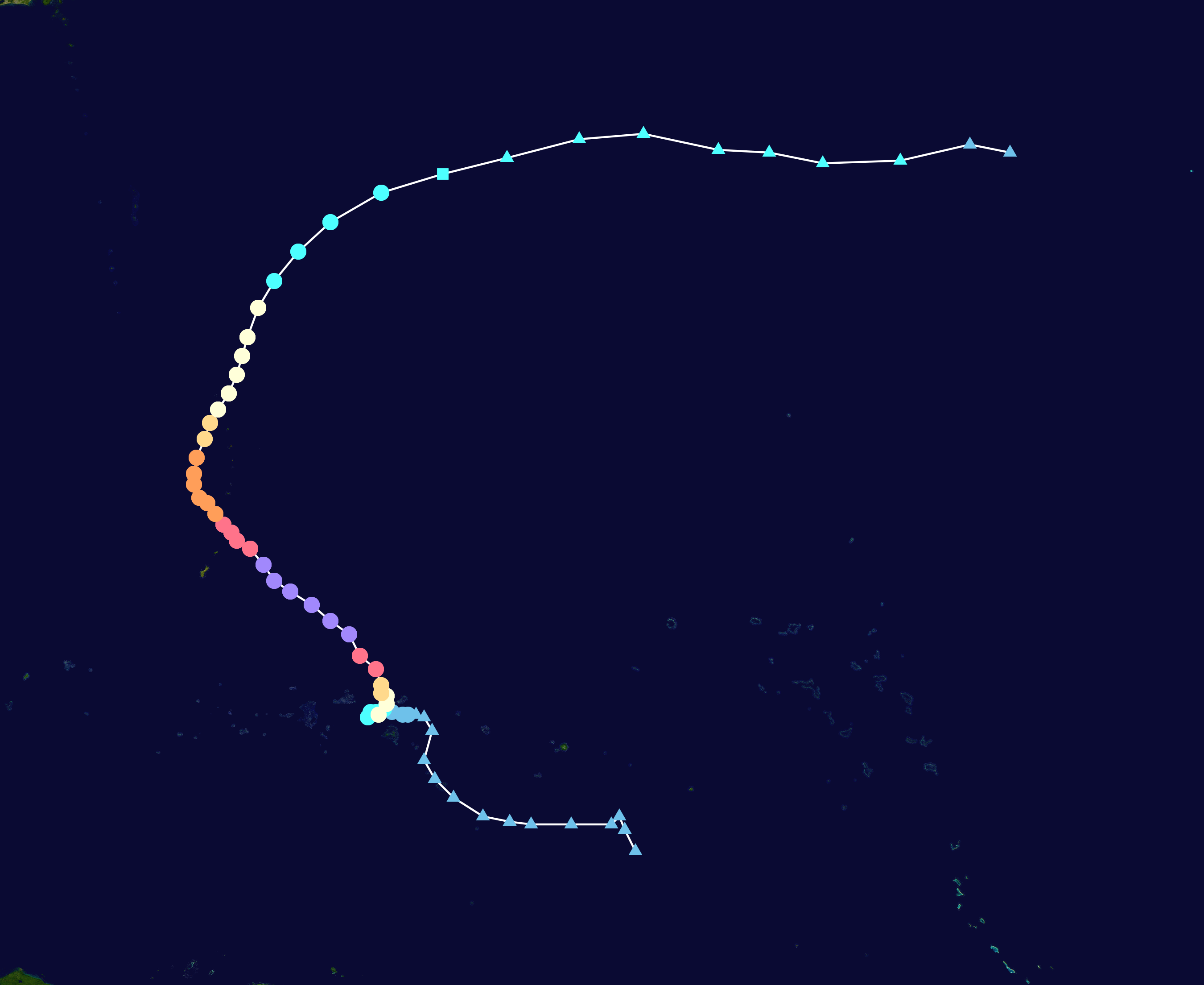
Map plotting the storm's track and intensity, according to the Saffir–Simpson scale Map key Saffir–Simpson scale Tropical depression (≤38 mph, ≤62 km/h) Tropical storm (39–73 mph, 63–118 km/h) Category 1 (74–95 mph, 119–153 km/h) Category 2 (96–110 mph, 154–177 km/h) Category 3 (111–129 mph, 178–208 km/h) Category 4 (130–156 mph, 209–251 km/h) Category 5 (≥157 mph, ≥252 km/h) Unknown Storm type Tropical cyclone Subtropical cyclone Extratropical cyclone, remnant low, tropical disturbance, or monsoon depression

The origins of Typhoon Sinlaku are traced back to an atmospheric circulation center near Majuro that crossed the International Date Line at 4°N on March 29, 2026. No development occurred—contrary to weather forecasting models—as it held weak convection moving southwestward, and merged with another circulation west of Tarawa inside the Intertropical Convergence Zone. The resultant center later developed south of Kosrae by April 4, turning west and slowly organizing over time. Low vertical wind shear, warm sea surface temperatures of 29–30 °C (84–86 °F), and poleward outflow allowed convection to flare and overcast the center. Additionally, a powerful westerly wind burst that also spawned Cyclones Maila and Vaianu in the Southern Hemisphere contributed to the disturbance's consolidation. By 06:00 UTC of April 8, the Japan Meteorological Agency (JMA) classified the system as a tropical depression as it drifted northwestward; the Joint Typhoon Warning Center followed suit eighteen hours later on April 9, designating it the numeral identifier 04W. Weakly steering west between a near-equatorial ridge in the Central North Pacific and the eastern edge of a subtropical ridge over the Luzon Strait, the system intensified from an abundance of mid-level moisture. The embryonic storm consisted of a large, defined, partially-exposed circulation center with nascent convective banding over its northwest quadrant. The rainbands later improved and expanded to the north and west of the storm, leading to it becoming a tropical storm at 18:00 UTC according to the JMA and JTWC, with the former agency labeling it Sinlaku.

A ragged central dense overcast then emerged, with satellite imagery detecting intense burst of lightning storms despite dry air and vertical shear restricting outflow from the southeast. By 09:00 UTC of April 10, the JMA classified Sinlaku a severe tropical storm. The overcast rapidly expanded over the eastern edge of the slow-moving, meandering system, with very cold overshooting tops of −97 °C (−143 °F) and a defined gravity wave propagation indicating further intensification. At 18:00 UTC, the JMA reported that Sinlaku had strengthened into a typhoon, followed by the JTWC six hours later on the next day. The addition of high ocean heat content and strong diverging winds aloft amplified by an upper-level trough led to extremely favorable conditions for development, commencing a period of rapid intensification. Despite a ragged eye struggling to form, it later became well-defined and reached near-perfect symmetry as Sinlaku drifted northwestward towards the Mariana Islands, becoming a super typhoon at 06:00 UTC on April 12. In addition, a vigorous radial outflow structure—which is indicated by cirriform clouds—was exhibited. Furthermore, the dense overcast became uniform as southern banding elongated, and six hours later, the JMA and JTWC both reported that Sinlaku had attained peak intensity; the JMA reported 10-minute maximum sustained winds of 215 km/h (130 mph) and a lowest atmospheric pressure of 905 hPa (26.72 inHg), and the JTWC estimated 1-minute winds of 295 km/h (185 mph). Shortly after, an outer eyewall was detected on microwave imagery, suggesting the onset of an eyewall replacement cycle—a process common in very powerful tropical cyclones. Sinlaku slightly weakened as a result, though its inner eyewall remained strong.

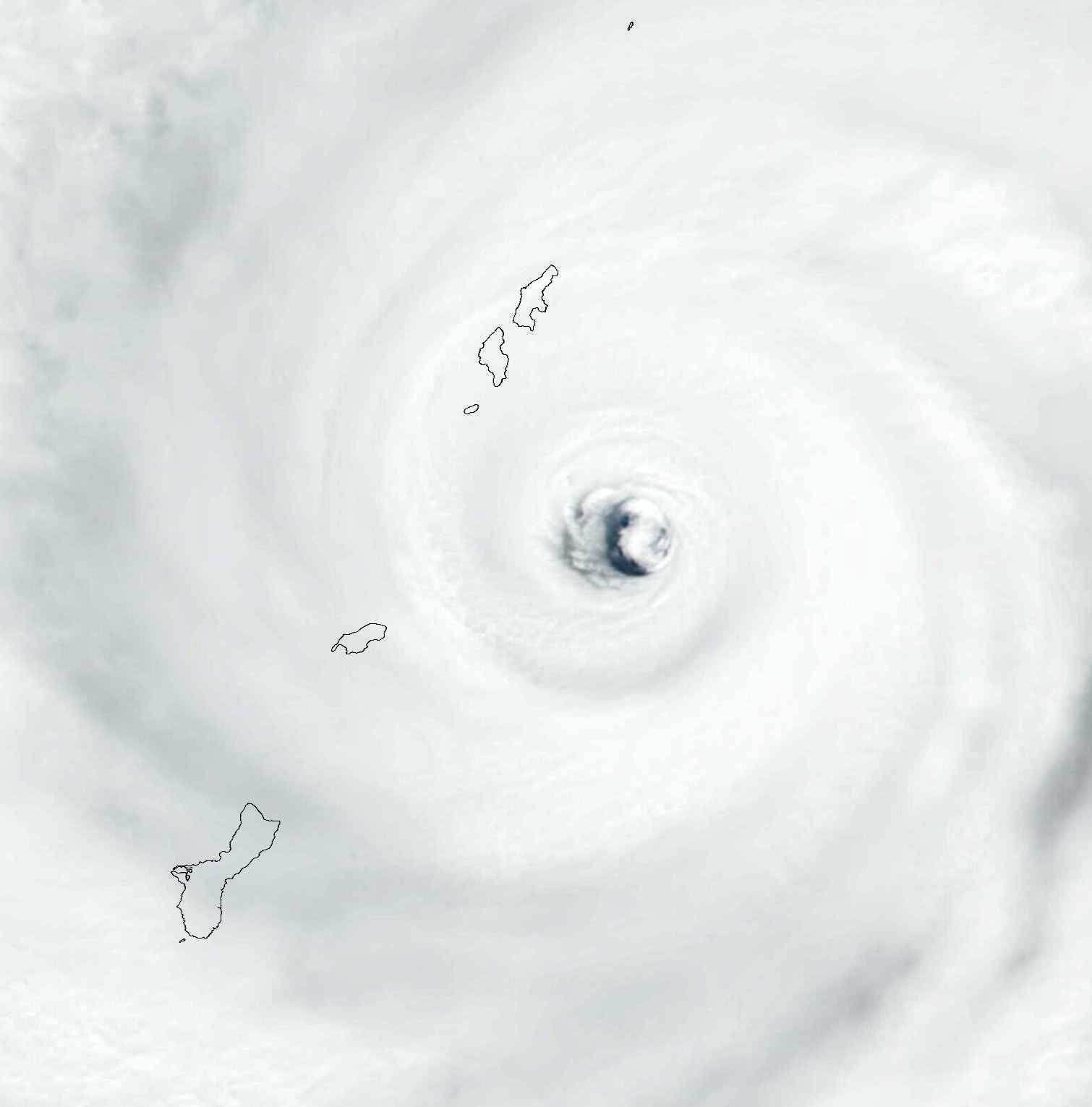
Typhoon Sinlaku approaching the Mariana Islands on April 14

The persistent, extraordinarily favorable environment slowed weakening from the cycle and dry air intrusion, though the size of the central dense overcast decreased on April 13. Initially preserving its nearly axisymmetrical structure, Sinlaku's northern periphery began to deform as the outer eyewall encircled the smaller inner eyewall, leaving a moat. As Sinlaku neared the island of Saipan, a scatterometer passing directly over the storm's center revealed winds of gale-force with a diameter of 400 nautical miles (740 km; 460 mi). At 11:40 UTC on April 14, the western side of the eyewall struck Tinian and Saipan, with a gust to 240 km/h (150 mph) being recorded near Tinian airport. Despite convection remaining strong, the center became more ragged as the inner eyewall further diminished as Sinlaku decelerated significantly, prolonging its effects on the Mariana Islands. At 12:00 UTC, the JTWC reported that Sinlaku was no longer a super typhoon. By the next day, the eyewall replacement cycle was near completion as a mass of dry air to the west began invading through Sinlaku's southeastern outer bands. The eye became 30 nautical miles (56 km; 35 mi) wide and Sinlaku had expanded its wind field, maintaining winds of 215 km/h (130 mph), according to the JTWC. A eyewall replacement cycle then started for a second time, evident by a secondary eyewall formation. It caused the eye turning cloud-filled while Sinlaku recurved north-northeastward under the influence of the near-equatorial ridge to the southeast.

Sinlaku continued to steadily weaken from the marginal conditions, losing its defined eye on April 16, entering an area of lower sea surface temperatures and increased wind shear. The weak inner eyewall then collapsed, moving the deepest convection to the outer eyewall. Regardless of outflow boosted by the westerlies, convective activity decreased near the core of the system. By the start of April 18, the JMA downgraded Sinlaku back to a severe tropical storm. Furthermore, an increasingly exposed circulation center led the JTWC to report that Sinlaku had degraded to a tropical storm at 12:00 UTC. Convection shifted to the east quadrants as low-level stratocumulus clouds advected southward from the subsident dry air mass. Amidst the very unconducive conditions, Sinlaku began transitioning into an extratropical cyclone during the next day, accelerating while 459 km (285 mi) northwest of Minamitorishima. At 06:00 UTC, the JMA determined that Sinlaku had weakened into a tropical storm. The JTWC described the system as a hybrid subtropical storm with frontogenesis occurring to the east. The final bulletin on the storm from the JTWC was issued at 18:00 UTC, followed by the JMA six hours later on April 20—which concluded that Sinlaku had become an extratropical low moving east-northeastward under the influence of the mid-latitude westerlies.

== Preparations ==
=== Northern Mariana Islands ===
Animated loop of Sinlaku at peak intensity on April 13

The Northern Mariana Islands Office of Homeland Security and Emergency Management said that Sinlaku could bring heavy rains to the islands, adding that tropical-storm force winds would be felt by April 13. Officials in the islands urged residents to prepare for the effects of the typhoon. Later on April 11, the typhoon watch was extended to Rota, Tinian, and Saipan, with the preparation of emergency shelters commencing there. These watches were later upgraded to warnings as the storm approached.

=== Guam ===
At 11:00 ChST (01:00 UTC) on April 11, a typhoon watch was issued for Guam. Some residents started preparing for the eventual effects of Sinlaku. Due to Sinlaku's intensification and weather predictions, Guam Governor Lou Leon Guerrero declared a state of emergency at 17:00 ChST (07:00 UTC) that same day. As of April 12, the entirety of Guam was put in a storm watch. The Guam Department of Public Works placed heavy equipment in flood-prone areas and started the cleaning of drainage pipes in poor drainage areas. Guam Waterworks Authority also finished preparations of the water and wastewater system before Sinlaku. The application submission period of the Summer Youth Employment Program of Guam was postponed while clinic operations, rehabilitation, and radiology services in the Guam Regional Medical City were delayed.

Seven school emergency shelters: three in northern Guam, one in central Guam, and three in southern Guam, opened at 18:00 ChST (08:00 UTC) due to Sinlaku. As the typhoon drew closer, Leon Guerrero requested United States President Donald Trump to declare a pre-landfall Emergency Disaster to easily mobilize critical resources. The Port Authority of Guam entered a phase of storm readiness, securing port assets and making employees finalize disaster-preventing measures. The Guam Daily Post temporarily ceased print operations due to preparations for Sinlaku. The 38th Guam Legislature was called into a special session by Guerrero, leading to the passing of a bill appropriating $25 million to the Office of the Governor for typhoon response. $100,000 was also appropriated to the mayors of each village in Guam to aid in emergency response. Due to the conditions, 18 departure flights: 12 from United Airlines, one from Japan Airlines, three from Korean Air, and two from Philippine Airlines, and 18 arrival flights: 13 from United Airlines, one from Japan Airlines and Philippine Airlines, and three from Korean Air were cancelled.

== Impact ==
Casualties and damages by country
Country	Deaths	Missing	Damages (USD)	Source
Micronesia	9	1	$96 million	
Northern Mariana Islands	6	0	>$1 billion	
Guam	2	0	$458 million	
Total	17	1	>$1.55 billion	

=== Northern Mariana Islands ===
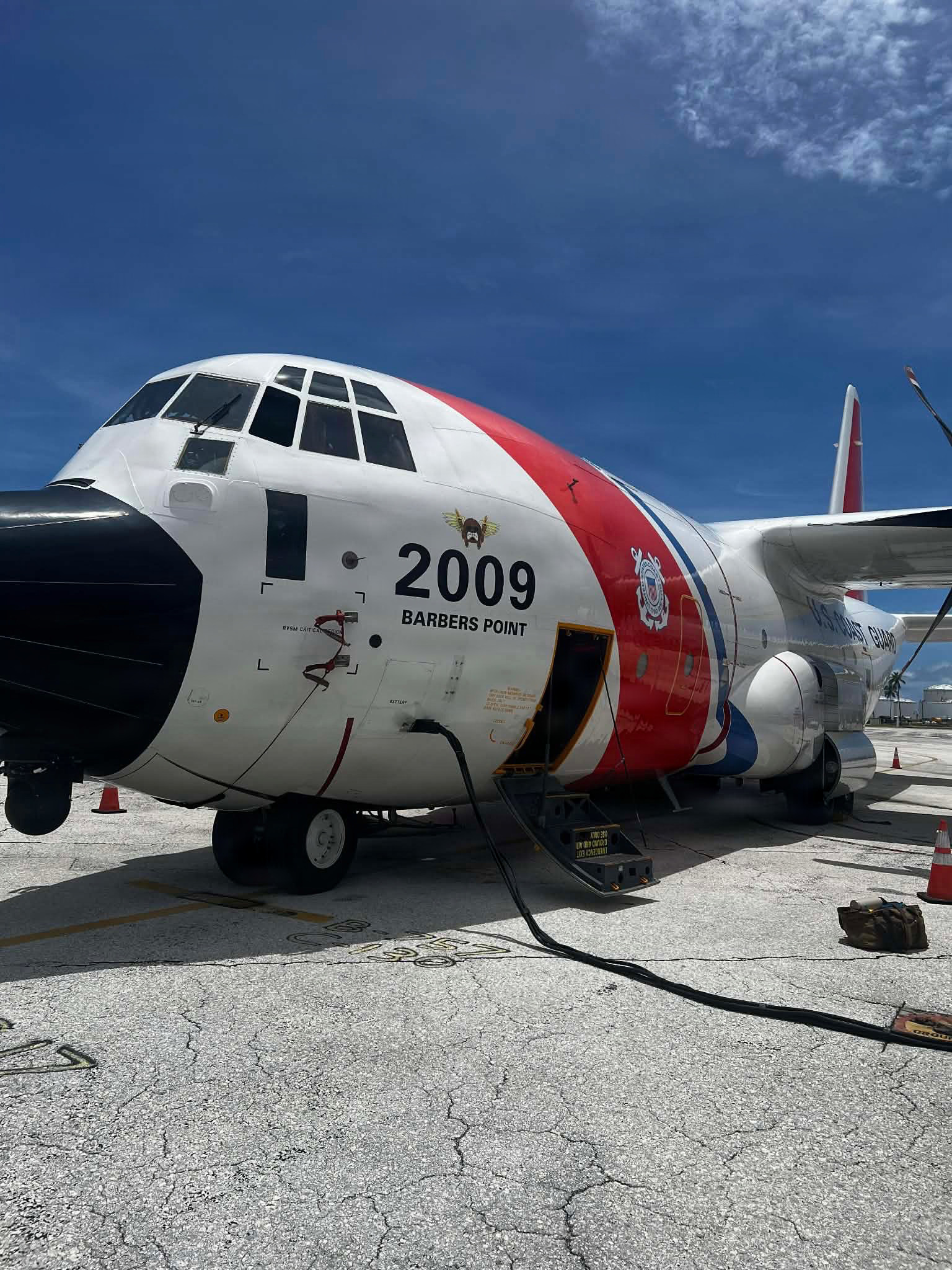
An HC-130 Hercules plane from the United States Coast Guard prepares to takeoff to aid in recovery efforts on Saipan

Sinlaku caused catastrophic destruction across the Northern Mariana Islands, particularly on Saipan and Tinian. With sustained winds reaching 150 mph (240 km/h), the storm demolished numerous wooden and tin-roofed homes and caused significant roof failures in commercial buildings. The entire electrical grid on both islands collapsed, and toppled communication towers left residents without mobile or internet services for an extended period.

The storm's slow movement across the archipelago resulted in intense rainfall—exceeding 20 inches (51 cm) in some areas—and severe flash flooding. The strength of the eyewall and slow movement of the storm prompted multiple Extreme Wind Warnings, extending into the afternoon hours of April 15. In residential districts, winds were powerful enough to flip vehicles and stack them on top of one another, while many concrete homes suffered from water seepage through every crevice. Critical facilities, including Northern Marianas College, faced fresh setbacks as buildings still being repaired from previous storms were battered again. The Associated Press reported that cars were overturned, power poles toppled, and roofs were ripped away, causing the displacement of many residents in Saipan. Several weeks after the storm, power outages still remained. The small coastal cargo ship Mariana was found overturned in waters north of the islands, with six people missing as of April 19. Japan and multiple agencies provided air and sea assets to aid in the search held by the United States Coast Guard. Total damages caused by the typhoon amounted to over $1 billion, per FEMA estimates.

=== Guam ===
Guam, situated south of the storm's eye, experienced tropical-storm-force sustained winds as well as gusts peaking at 88 mph (141 km/h). These conditions resulted in widespread power outages and disrupted the island's water distribution systems. Heavy rain bands prompted the closure of all schools and government offices, while over 1,000 residents across the Mariana Islands were forced to seek emergency shelter as disaster relief teams began arriving to assist. All senior centers in Guam were closed due to Sinlaku. Total damage from the storm on the island amounted to at least $458 million, including $435 million to public infrastructure and $23–24 million to businesses.

=== Federated States of Micronesia ===
In the Federated States of Micronesia, one fatality was reported in Tonowas and one person was reported missing at sea. A report by the International Federation of Red Cross and Red Crescent Societies reported that Chuuk State was experiencing a "near-total blackout;" hospitals utilized backup emergency power and communication was disrupted within the islands inside and outside the state. Many roads in Weno were deemed impassable. Carrying 4,000 gallons of fuel, the vessel Ms. Chief Mailo was lying on its side due to the effects of Sinlaku, posing a threat to the environment. The islands of Weno, Fananu, Piherarh, Tamatam, Onoun, Fanapanges, Parem, and Uman experienced major damage to homes, infrastructure, and food crops. Overall, 34,000 people were affected and 100 were displaced in the Federated States of Micronesia. Structural and crop damages caused by the typhoon amounted to $96 million.

== Response and aftermath ==
The Guam Power Authority offered help in reinstating power in the Northern Mariana Islands, reaching out to personnel from the Commonwealth Utilities Corporation of the Islands. All schools within the scope of the Guam Department of Education were kept closed under further notice, with Department spokesperson Michael Borja reporting that the schools will be opened once "all of our schools are ready to go"; none of the schools suffered damage, but operational and health concerns still affect the schools. As of 09:00 ChST on April 19, 73% of system loads and 86% of feeders and circuits in Guam were reinstated, with every major substation energized and most of its power restored. Seniors in Guam were provided hot meals by "Grab and Go" as well as home delivery due to the closure of senior centers.

== See also ==
- Weather of 2026
- Tropical cyclones in 2026
- Other storms of the same name
- List of typhoons in the Mariana Islands
- List of super typhoons
- List of violent typhoons
- Typhoon Yutu (2018) – The strongest typhoon to strike the Mariana Islands until Bavi
- Typhoon Mawar (2023) – Another powerful typhoon which severely impacted Guam nearly 3 years prior
- Typhoon Bavi (2026) – A violent typhoon that affected the Mariana Islands nearly three months after Sinlaku
