= List of typhoons in the Mariana Islands =

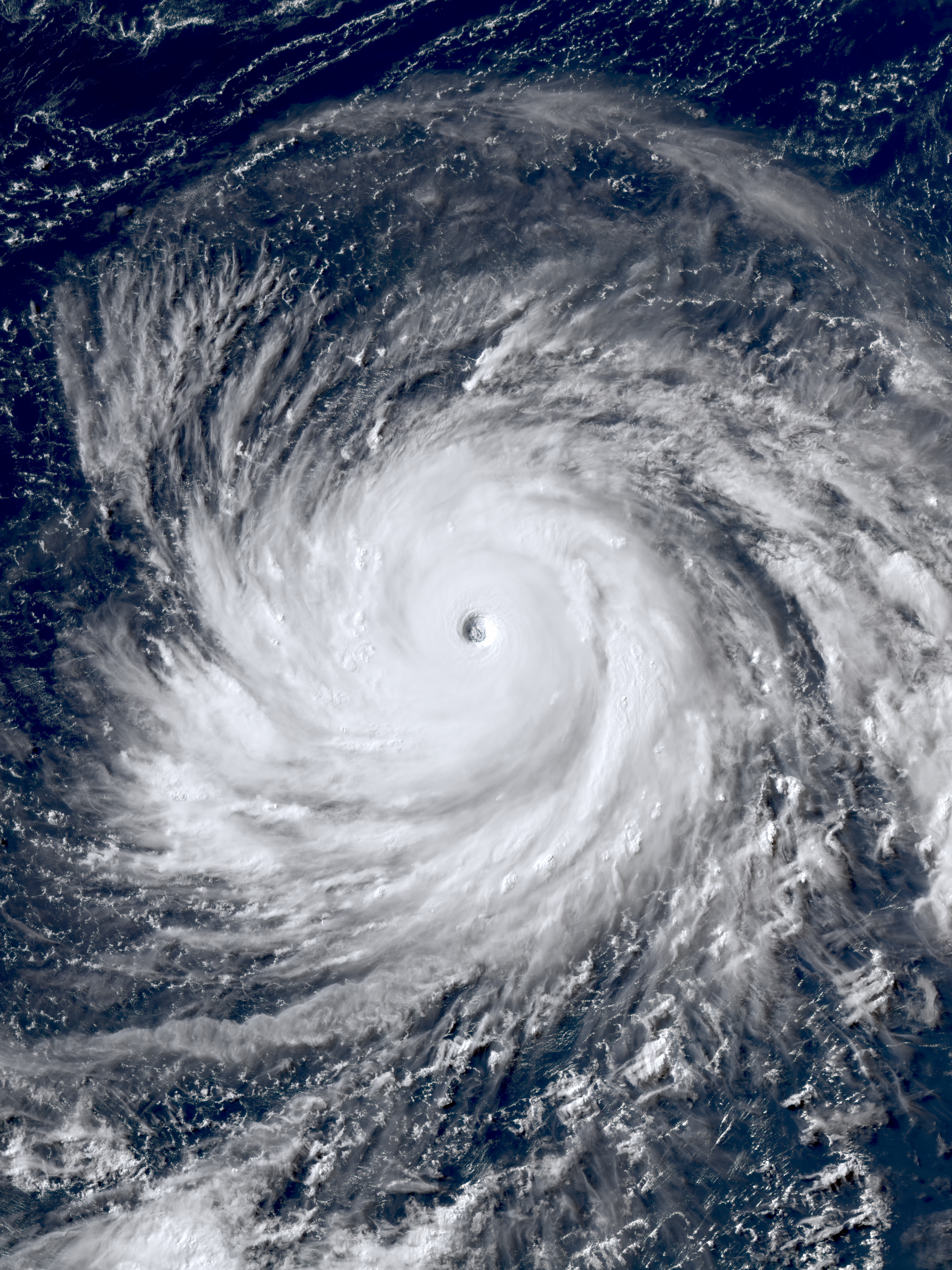
Typhoon Bavi, the most powerful tropical cyclone on record to hit the Mariana Islands.

The Mariana Islands are an archipelago located in the Northwest Pacific Ocean consisting of two territories of the United States: the Northern Mariana Islands and Guam. The Mariana Islands lie in the path of typhoons and it is common for the islands to be threatened by tropical depressions, storms, and occasional typhoons during the wet season. The highest risk of typhoons is from August through November. They can, however, occur year-round. This is a list of typhoons that caused deaths, injuries and/or damage on the Mariana Islands.

Typhoons are monitored by the United States Joint Typhoon Warning Center and due to the potential damage typhoons can cause, the tropical cyclones are concerns towards civilian and military communities on the islands. Some of the typhoons that have significantly impacted the islands since 1945 are Typhoon Karen of 1962, Pamela of 1976, Omar of 1992, Paka of 1997, Yutu of 2018, Mawar of 2023, and Sinlaku and Bavi of 2026.

== Background and Climatology ==
The Mariana Islands are overseas territories of the United States. Being in the Northwest Pacific Ocean, the islands are often threatened by typhoons in a year-round basis. In preparations for the storms, the islands may be put under Tropical Cyclone Condition of Readiness, instructing residents towards safety based on the severity of the storm. The Joint Typhoon Warning Center monitors the basin, and issues warnings on significant tropical cyclones for the United States Government, assigning them two-digit TC numbers (with suffix "W"). These warnings use a 1-minute sustained wind speed and can be compared to the Saffir–Simpson hurricane wind scale; however, the JTWC uses their own scale for intensity classifications in this basin. The United States' Joint Typhoon Warning Center (JTWC) unofficially classifies typhoons with wind speeds of at least 130 knots (150 mph; 240 km/h)—the equivalent of a strong Category 4 storm on the Saffir–Simpson scale—as super typhoons.

Tropical cyclogenesis in the West Pacific commences over the summer monsoon trough. The trough peaks on October, before being dominated by winter trade winds by December. The islands are located east of the primary area for development.

== List of storms ==
=== Pre-1900s ===
- October 7, 1671: "Eye passed directly over island, with most of the homes on the island toppled, as well as the church and the rectory suffering the same fate. A great many people were killed by falling debris and inadequate shelter while the damage to agriculture crops was a serious loss to the people."
- November 11, 1680: "It lasted two days and caused frightful disorder. Almost all the houses were toppled over, canoes smashed, trees and crops ruined. To add to the disaster, the sea became so swollen that the people were obliged to flee to the mountains"
- November 20, 1693: "It began at dusk on the night of November 20 with a deluge of rain. The wind moved from north to south and whipped up the sea to such a manner that it seemed as if the island of Guam would be submerged. The sea broke its bounds and spread inland taking trees, houses and churches with it. Even the fortress at Agana toppled and was washed away. Not a house nor building remained standing on the island. Inland from the shore, the soil was covered with sand and stones left there by the subsiding sea."
- December 1733: "severely damaged all trees and food crops. In Agaña it destroyed all buildings that had remained standing after the town fire of March of the same year."
- April 7, 1807: "All the houses destroyed by the strong typhoon."
- September 9, 1822: "damaged the Palacio and other Spanish administration buildings, among them the government store"
- May 23, 1847: "A typhoon of horrible wind destroyed a greater part of the houses. No one killed."
- August 10, 1848: "described as a devastating typhoon that caused extensive damage"
- September 23, 1853: "causing widespread devastation"
- April 17, 1859: "Strong typhoon - a ship, although having two anchors, was thrown against the reef."
- February 14, 1864: "Damage to roads and houses, crop lost due to salt spray."
- June 21–23, 1868: "Roofs of houses went off, but no casualties. One ship was thrown onto another in harbor."
- September 19, 1872: "caused damage to buildings and agricultural production, and also wrecked a Spanish mail ship. [...] Damage to Spanish buildings includes roof damage to the Palacio in Agaña, as well as the Casa Reál (former palace) in Umatac."

=== 1900s ===
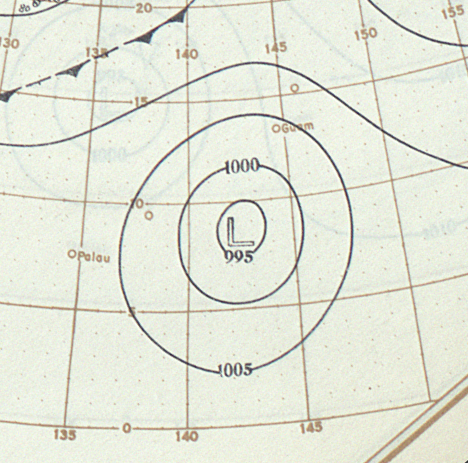
Surface weather analysis of the tropical cyclone that impacted Guam on November 13, 1900

- May 26, 1900: "severely affecting the southern part of the island by demolishing structures in Sumay, Agat, Merizo and Inarajan. Damage to vegetation was substantial, with all crops destroyed. The vessel USS Brutus was torn off her moorings in Apra Harbor and blown onto a reef"
- November 13, 1900: "A typhoon devastates Guam Island, destroying towns and 100 lives; the cruiser Yosemite founders."
- October 19, 1901: The center of a tropical cyclone passed between Guam and Rota, unroofing several native houses along the Agana Beach. Wharfs were destroyed or badly damaged.

=== 1910s ===
- October 31, 1911: A storm passed south of Guam, taking down telephone poles in the south side of the island. Many houses in Merizo had their roofs torn.
- August 26–30, 1912: Crops in Guam were damaged by a typhoon.
- December 15–17, 1912: Crops in Guam were damaged by a typhoon.
- September 17–19, 1913: The center of a tropical cyclone passed north of Guam, damaging copra crops with winds.
- November 10, 1913: This typhoon took down many trees and telephone poles and unroofed houses across Guam. Storm surge washed away a wharf in Agana, and sank many sampans. It flooded all low-lying areas of the town.
- July 7, 1914: Passing north of Guam, typhoon-force winds swept in Apra Harbor, which were the heaviest in years. The storm damaged crops, buoyage, and boat channels.
- September 2–3, 1915: Gusty winds and heavy rain damaged crops on the northern side of the island.
- July 6, 1918: The eye of this storm passed over Agana, which the atmospheric pressure was measured at 954 mbar (28.17 inHg). The typhoon killed six, left thousands homeless, and caused over thousands of dollars in property damage. Natives had their homes overturned while substantial structures had their roofs torn or become demolished. Many telephone and power poles as well as coconut trees were downed. It is thought to have caused enormous damage to crops. A palm tree at the mouth of the Agana River survived the typhoon, which later inspired the design of the Seal of Guam.
- September 17, 1918: A typhoon passed northeast of the island, causing minor damage to crops.
- August 20–21, 1919: The center of this storm passed south of Guam and caused minor damage to crops.

=== 1920s ===
- March 26, 1923: A slow-moving typhoon passed south of the island, with its atmospheric pressure measured at 982 mbar (29.00 inHg). Its winds damaged the southern portion of the island. Bridges and roads were washed out.
- October 1, 1924: A typhoon passed south of Guam with atmospheric pressure of 999 mbar (29.50 inHg), which was measured at Sumay. The storm produced rainfall of 19 in (48 cm) in 15 hours before going further to 28.25 in (71.8 cm) within 30 hours. The total 33.09 in (84.0 cm) of rainfall was measured in 48 hours. The flood caused a death and destroyed 50 buildings, causing $100,000 in losses. Overflowed rivers swept away houses of natives and sections of roads and bridges.
- October 25, 1925: The center of this storm passed south of Guam with a pressure of 991 mbar (29.26 inHg), producing heavy waves along the southern shore between Inarajan and Merizo. Roads and bridges were damaged, and strong winds downed hundreds of trees and unroofed many houses.

=== 1930s ===
- December 3, 1935: A typhoon passed southwest with a pressure of 998 mbar (29.47 inHg) and gusts of 60 kn (70 mph; 110 km/h), damaging trees and crops, though structures were slightly damaged.

=== 1940s ===
- November 3, 1940: A storm destroyed a majority of the island's crops, caused extensive damage to many military structures, and destroyed thousands of residential homes. Governor George McMillin requested $50,000 (1940 USD, $1.15 million 2026 USD) in aid from the American Red Cross.
- August 3, 1941: The eye of this typhoon passed the northern point of Guam. A pressure of 969 mbar (28.61 inHg) and wind gusts of 108 kn (125 mph; 200 km/h) were estimated at Agana. The storm also produced rainfall of 12.42 in (31.5 cm). Damage was done towards roofs and telephone, electrical lines and trees were also downed. Rivers that overflowed flooded houses nearby and washed out roads.
- September 21, 1946: Typhoon Querida's eye was between Rota and Guam, producing gusts of 85 kn (100 mph; 155 km/h). The storm damaged temporary buildings and Quonset huts. Seventy percent of Orote Point Naval Air Station suffered damage, and many large hangars at Harmon Field sustained damage. The village of Agat had 30 of its houses destroyed, with another 30 being very damaged, although only 1 injury was reported.
- November 7, 1949: Typhoon Allyn brought wind gusts of over 100 kn (115 mph; 185 km/h) to the island. 2,500 houses were damaged across Guam, and 60% of Inarajan was destroyed by flooding. The storm completely flooded Cocos Island. Four major bridges collapsed. The damage totaled $91.1 million and there were many injuries, although no deaths occurred.

=== 1950s ===
- May 9, 1950: Typhoon Doris produced 2 ft (0.61 m) of standing water in Inarajan, which washed out parts of the road between Inarajan and Merizo.
- December 31, 1951: Typhoon Hester passed south of Guam by 130 miles (210 km), and no damage to military facilities were reported. Storm surge reached 200 feet (61 m) inland, to about 10 feet (3.0 m) above sea level. The only damage reported were crops being lashed by the waves on the south side of the island, and a new section of highway near Ylig River was washed away. Two shore wave recorders installed by the University of California, Berkeley, located in Tarague Beach and Ylig River, were destroyed. There were no casualties on the island.
- February 22, 1953: Typhoon Irma produced gusts of 55 kn (65 mph; 100 km/h) while south of Agana, and also produced 6 in (15 cm) of rain in 15 hours, damaging trees and crops.
- August 10, 1953: Typhoon Nina flooded the Inarajan road and Talofofo bridge and also uprooted trees.
- October 14–16, 1953: Typhoon Alice's 24-hour rainfall total at Andersen Air Base, 18.33 in (466 mm), was the record high in Guam until Typhoon Pamela of 1976 struck the island. The resulting floods washed away four bridges across the island, cutting off access to the villages of Talofofo, Inarajan, Merizo, and Umatac. Floodwaters at Tamuning reached 3 to 4 feet (0.91 to 1.22 m) high. Electricity was shut off in areas with flooding issues, and a boil-water advisory was in effect. Multiple roads, including Highways 4 and 8, were rendered impassable, and Marine Drive had debris floating and stalled cars alongside it.
- November 16, 1957: Typhoon Lola's eye passed south of Agana with gusts of over 100 kn (115 mph; 185 km/h), stripping roofs from structures and breaking windows. Quonset huts were also blown down. Many houses were flooded by overflowing rivers. Lola caused $5 million in damage, and no casualties were reported.

=== 1960s ===
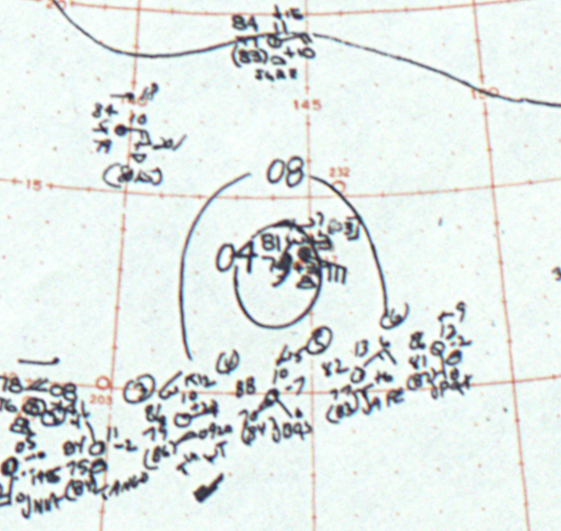
Surface weather analysis of Typhoon Sally near Guam on September 5, 1964

- September 10, 1961: Typhoon Nancy destroyed about half of all crops on the southern end of Guam and a total of $40,000 worth of damage was done to roads on the island.
- November 11, 1962: Typhoon Karen was regarded as the worst typhoon to ever impact Guam. 95 percent of homes were destroyed, and those left standing were damaged. Approximately 45,000 people, mostly Guamanians, were left homeless. 11 people lost their lives and about 100 others were injured. Losses across the island amounted to $250 million (1962 USD, $2.66 billion 2026 USD). The damage across Guam was described as "'much more serious" than it had been during the second Battle of Guam, when American troops retook the island from the Japanese. The U.S. Navy described the damage as equal to that of an indirect hit from a nuclear bomb. Acting governor Manuel Guerrero said that the recovery effort of the previous 17 years had been "completely wiped out".
- April 29, 1963: Typhoon Olive destroyed 120 houses and severely damaged 1,140 homes, leaving at least 1,000 homeless. The effects of the typhoon set back Guam's recovery from Typhoon Karen the previous year, damaging homes partially repaired via recovery loans for Karen. Olive caused $5 million in damages, with damage towards crops accounting 20% of it.
- July 11, 1963: Typhoon Wendy spared Guam from the brunt of its winds due to its small size, although damage was reported to crops.
- September 5, 1964: Typhoon Sally was ultimately stronger and closer to Guam than forecasted, crossing over southern Guam as a developing typhoon and producing damaging winds. The island's southern districts sustained the heaviest impacts from Sally; 18 structures in those areas were damaged, with the impacts most evident to their roofs. The majority of the monetary losses caused by Sally on the island was sustained by crops: agricultural damage was estimated at $105,440, with $92,398 sustained by the banana crop. Damage to residential and commercial buildings was estimated at $9,680, resulting in a total damage toll of about $115,000, mostly were to farm crops. Sally's impacts in Guam were negligible outside of the southern regions of the island, and there were no casualties.
- October 6, 1965: Typhoon Carmen struck the islands of Pagan, Agrihan, and Alamagan with estimated winds of 175 mph. Every house on Agrihan was destroyed, as was the school, dispensary, and other buildings, requiring all inhabitants of the island to be evacuated to Saipan. 208 fishermen were killed seeking shelter in the lee of Agrihan during the storm.
- November 13, 1967: Typhoon Gilda passed over Rota, causing heavy damage. 100 structures were destroyed and 8 people were injured. On Guam, Gilda caused extensive damage to crops.
- April 11, 1969: Typhoon Jean devastated Saipan, with 90% of houses destroyed. Winds were estimated to be as high as 150 kt.
- November 23, 1968: Typhoon Ora caused a power outage, broken windows and downed trees. A school in Dededo had their roof collapsed. Ora flooded rivers, which inundated bridges.

=== 1970s ===
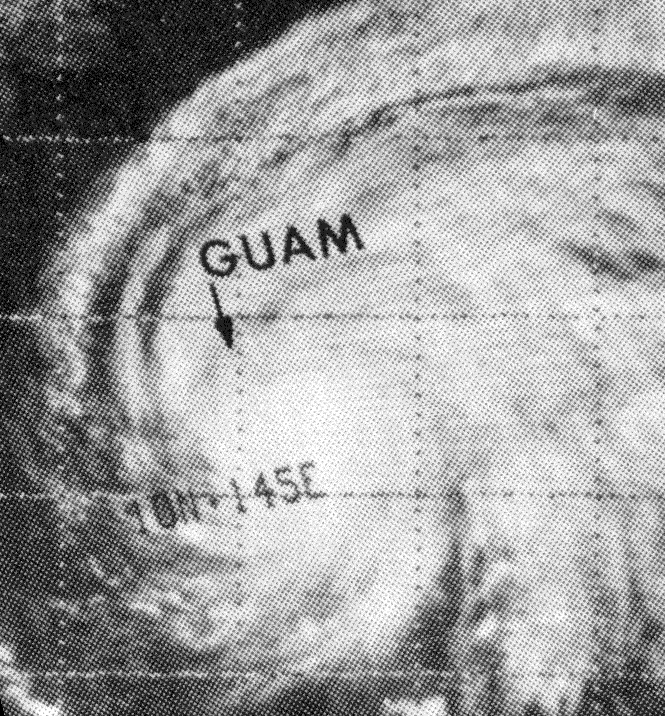
Typhoon Pamela near Guam on May 20, 1976

- May 3, 1971: Typhoon Amy flooded areas in the south side of Guam. Inarajan was inundated, and the total of $902,000 in damages was estimated, with damaged crops accounting for 80% of it.
- August 11–13, 1974: Typhoon Mary caused a tug pulling RMS Caronia to Taiwan to become overcome by the weather as it sought shelter at Guam, and cut loose Caronia, which was driven against the breakwater at the entrance to Apra Harbor on August 12, blocking all ship traffic. It resulted in the loss of $3.3 million. A $250,000 yacht was also lost. 2 people drowned, and property damages totaled over $542,000.
- November 19, 1975: Typhoon June flooded sections of the seacoast highway between Merizo and Umatec and also blocked the road between the Ylig Bridge and Talofofo. Its winds contributed to most of the damage around the center of Guam. Tornadoes were reported in the mentioned area. Power poles were downed towards Tamuning. Several houses in Mangilao were destroyed, accounting towards $1.3 million in damage alongside crop loss, and rendering 29 people homeless.
- May 21, 1976: Typhoon Pamela produced typhoon-force winds – greater than 118 km/h (73 mph) – for 18 hours. An estimated 80% of the buildings on Guam were damaged, including 3,300 houses that were destroyed. Pamela's slow motion produced 856 mm (33.7 in) of rainfall, making May 1976 the wettest on record in Guam.
- September 5, 1976: Typhoon Fran brushed the Mariana Islands, passing 35 km (22 mi) to the west of Guam. Damage, if any, is unknown, though sustained winds of 56 km/h (35 mph) and gusts of 76 km/h (47 mph) were observed on Guam.
- November 8, 1977: Typhoon Kim damaged 22 houses in the southern portion of Guam when its eye passed offshore, totaling $600,000 in losses.
- October 23, 1978: Typhoon Rita caused no major damage even though there was crop damage that was not immediately determined. 2 U.S. Navy personnel were killed and a third was injured while taking an antenna from a building during preparations from Rita. The antenna came in contact with a high-voltage wire. 7 people were injured, 4 seriously injured in a head-on auto collision. Investigators reported that the road was wet and that there were wind gusts at the time of the collision. A civilian suffered multiple injuries when he fell from the sixth floor of an apartment building where he was boarding up windows. His condition is not immediately known. The total damage was estimated at less than $700,000.
- January 10, 1979: Typhoon Alice moved within 90 mi (140 km) south of Guam, causing minor damage as strong winds and large waves affected the island.
- August 17, 1979: Typhoon Judy was then a tropical depression that rapidly developed near Guam, although the storm only caused minor damage.
- October 9, 1979: Typhoon Tip produced heavy rainfall early in its lifetime while passing near Guam, including a total of 23.1 cm (9.1 in) at Andersen Air Force Base. Gusts of 125 km/h (80 mph) were measured during October 9 at the Naval Base Guam, as the center of the storm was positioned 70 km (43 mi) south of Agana. Tip caused a total loss of nearly $1.6 million across Guam.

=== 1980s ===
- October 31, 1980: Typhoon Betty passed near Guam, where strong winds caused major crop damage and downed power lines. On October 30, the Antonio B. Won Pat International Airport was closed. Betty flooded the southeast quadrant of the island, causing moderate damage.
- November 12, 1984: Typhoon Bill produced minor flooding, disrupting electrical power and totaling crop damage at $7.7 million, as it accelerated 20 kn (25 mph; 35 km/h).
- December 3, 1986: Typhoon Kim passed just north of Saipan with 155 mph (250 km/h) winds. Damage on Saipan was substantial, with all of the island losing power and water, the total damage being estimated at $15 million. One person died indirectly from a heart attack due to the storm.
- October 19, 1987: Typhoon Lynn's eye passed just offshore Guam, bringing violent conditions to the island. Power was briefly knocked out for the entire island, though by October 20, electricity had been restored to most of the island. Several homes sustained serious damages while many others suffered roof damage. The banana and papaya crops were largely destroyed by the typhoon, but damage to other crops was minimal. No one in Guam was injured by Lynn.
- January 12, 1988: Typhoon Roy passed through the Mariana Islands and Guam, causing moderate structural damage and extensive crop losses. On Guam alone, agricultural losses reached $23.5 million (1988 USD; $64 million 2025 USD). Most structural damage was limited to broken windows on the island. About 300 families were left homeless. In the wake of the storm, the Federal Emergency Management Agency declared a state of emergency for Guam.
- April 29, 1989: Typhoon Andy's close passage brought sustained winds of 130 km/h (80 mph) and gusts up to 155 km/h (95 mph) to Guam. The storm's high winds downed many power lines, leaving about 15 percent of Guam without power for several hours. Overall damage from the storm was minimal despite the strong winds and no reports of major structural damage or injuries were received. $1 million in damages to crops was done by heavy rains from Andy.

=== 1990s ===
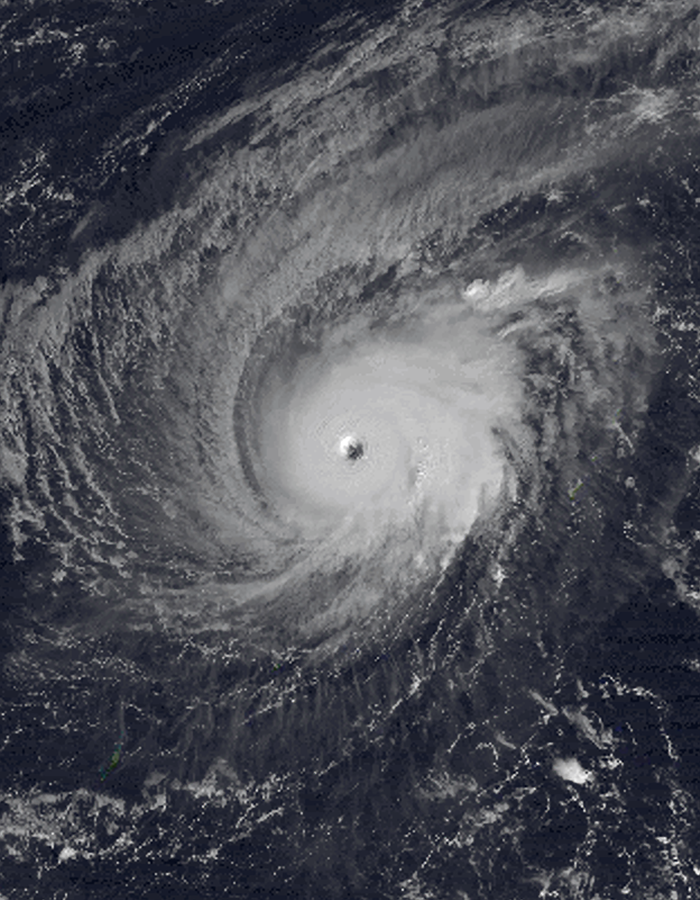
Typhoon Paka at peak intensity on December 18, 1997

- December 20, 1990: Typhoon Russ was the most severe typhoon to impact Guam in 14 years. In the southern portion, 341 homes were destroyed, 460 houses suffered major damage, and 1,120 houses sustained minor damage. Guam was left without power and water for several days, and prompted U.S. president George H. W. Bush to declare Guam a disaster area. Two ships in Apra Harbor broke their mooring, resulting in the loss of 11 fishermen. In total, Russ caused $120 million in damages.
- October 17, 1991: Typhoon Orchid, in conjunction of Typhoon Pat, killed two people by producing high surfs.
- November 27–29, 1991: Typhoon Yuri caused nearly all of Guam (ninety percent of the 133,000 residents at the time) to remain without water and electricity on November 29, nearly two days after the powerful tropical cyclone passed Guam. 2,500 of the residents that took shelters were crammed into 12 school shelters on November 28.
- August 1992: Typhoon Omar caused one death and $457 million (1992 USD, $1.05 billion 2026 USD) in damage. Strong gusts up to 248 km/h (154 mph) left nearly the entire island without power for several days. Omar damaged or destroyed 2,158 houses, leaving 3,000 people homeless. In response, the island's building codes were updated to withstand winds of 250 km/h (155 mph), and insurance companies discontinued new policies for structures not made of concrete.
- November 1992: Typhoon Gay struck Guam with sustained winds of 160 km/h (99 mph), with gusts to 195 km/h (121 mph) on Nimitz Hill. The winds were strong enough to disrupt power and water utilities, as well as destroy a few houses. Despite the extreme winds, little wind-thrown trees or snapped branches were observed. The combination of the winds and light rainfall, however, sprayed saltwater over the island's vegetation, leading to near island-wide loss of leaves. Along the east coast of Guam, Gay produced a storm surge of 1.2–1.8 m (3.9–5.9 ft). The surge reached 3.4 m (11 ft) on Cabras Island in northern Guam, washing sand and water onto coastal roads and breaking a boat from its moorings. Little additional damage occurred to the island's capital of Hagåtña.
- November 3, 1994: Typhoon Zelda passed over Anatahan, devastating the homes and crops of the 39 residents on the island.
- November 1996: Typhoon Dale passed south of Guam, bringing winds as high as 74 knots (137 km/h) and high seas which overtopped cliffs 30 metres (98 ft) high. Damage on the island totaled US$3.5 million
- April 1997: Typhoon Isa passed well to the south of Guam, though one of its outer rainbands stalled across the island, which dropped heavy rainfall of 15–25 cm (6–10 in) across the island. The rainfall was welcome as it occurred during the dry season. The rainband also produced wind gusts that reached 86 km/h (53 mph) at the island's Naval Air Station; the winds resulted in sporadic power outages across the island. The typhoon caused some light damage to buildings, particularly on the south side of the island. The combination of winds and sea salt caused damage to the island's tomato, okra, cucumber, and soy bean crops.
- December 17, 1997: Typhoon Paka destroyed around 1,500 buildings on Guam, of which 1,160 were single-family homes. A further 10,000 buildings sustained damage to some degree. In all, about 5,000 people were left homeless due to the typhoon. An estimated 30–40% of the public buildings received major damage.

=== 2000s ===
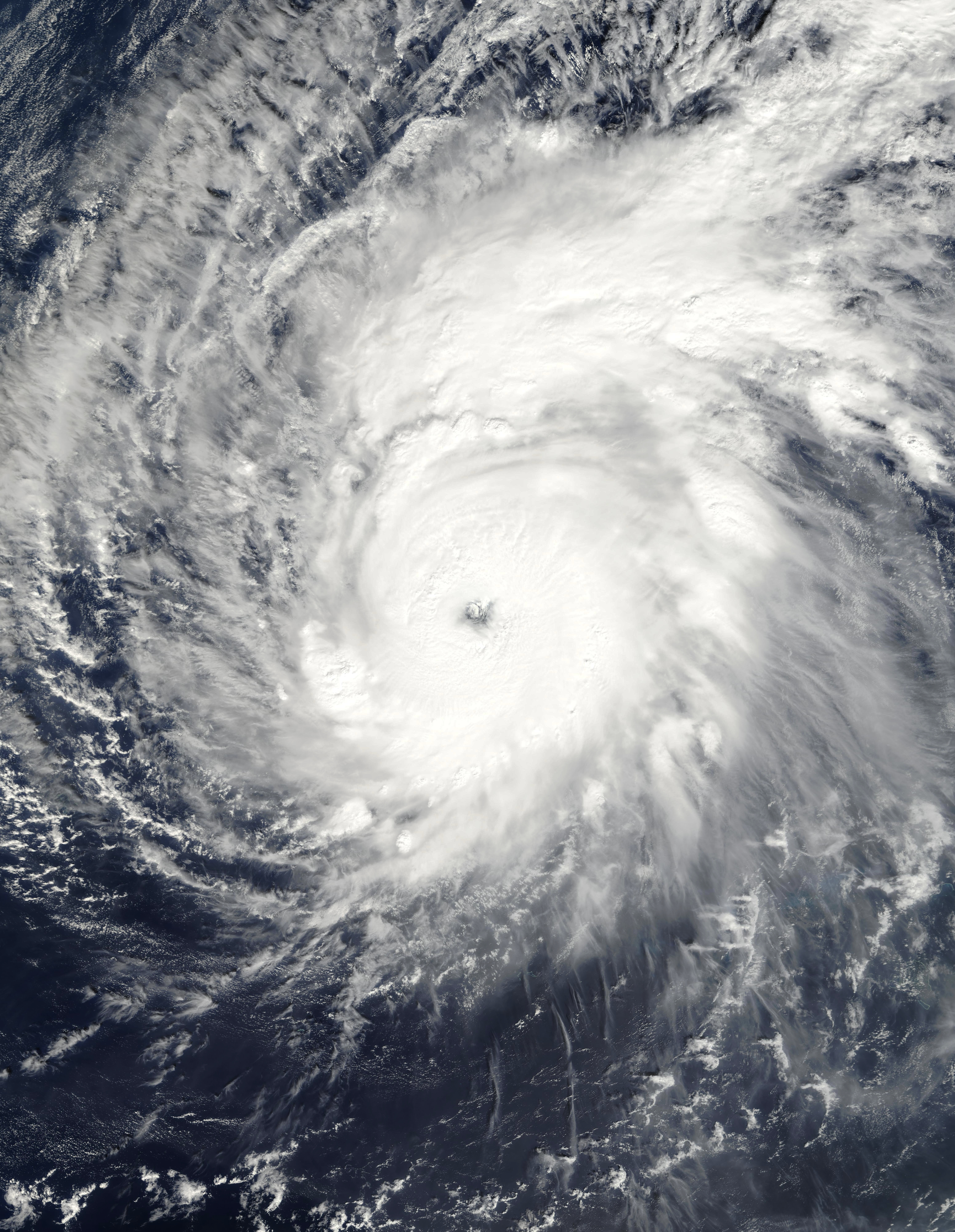
Typhoon Pongsona near peak intensity on December 8, 2002

- December 22, 2001: Typhoon Faxai drowned a 69-year-old man in Gun Beach by strong rip currents across the shoreline. The man was given CPR by rescuers and was transported to Guam Memorial Hospital before being pronounced dead. The legislation of Guam authorized the use of $250,000 for mitigation or safety of the citizens and was needed for preparation.
- July 4–5, 2002: Typhoon Chataan's high winds caused damage across Guam, mostly to roofs and to poorly built or wooden structures. A total of 1,996 houses were severely damaged or destroyed. The winds also downed power lines, leaving an island-wide power outage. The most significant effects were from the heavy rainfall, resulting in landslides in some areas and causing rivers to flow at above-normal rates. The storm flooding contaminated Fena Lake, which provides water to the military base, for a few days. In addition, 34 of the island's 110 water wells failed due to the storm. Flooding also destroyed a building and damaged the runway at Antonio B. Won Pat International Airport, and damaged a bridge near Inarajan. In Apra Harbor, high seas washed ashore or sank five boats, and a Navy barge spilled 397,000 litres (105,000 gallons) of oil. Overall, Chataan caused about $60 million in property damage on Guam, and there were 23 injuries, none of them serious.
- July 10, 2002: Typhoon Halong, while passing to the south, produced waves as high as 6 m (20 ft) in Inarajan. The waves left beach erosion along Guam's southern coast, and were higher than during Chataan's passage. Damage on the island was estimated at $40,000. The storm disrupted work to repair damage from Chataan. Portions of the island, including Guam Memorial Hospital, had their power restored after Chataan, only to lose electricity during Halong. The additional damage caused by Halong contributed to Governor Carl T.C. Gutierrez declaring the island as a state of emergency on July 22, which activated the Guam National Guard.
- December 8, 2002: Typhoon Pongsona had the third lowest recorded atmospheric pressure over Guam, after the Typhoon of 1900 and Karen. Typhoon Pongsona also left 65% of the island's water wells inoperable, with most of Guam left without water service following the storm. Officials estimate the typhoon destroyed 1,300 homes, severely damaged 1,825, and lightly damaged 4,800. Damage totaled over $700 million (2002 USD, $1.25 billion 2026 USD).
- June 28, 2004: Typhoon Tingting's record-breaking rainfall in Guam produced severe flooding and numerous landslides throughout the island. A total of 57 homes were destroyed and another 624 were damaged. Crop damage on the island amounted to $500,000 with most of the farmers reporting total crop losses. One person died after being swept away along a flooded road. Total property damage totaled $6 million.
- August 22–25, 2004: Typhoon Chaba's effects were mostly of minor extent in Guam. Despite moderate coastal inundation, beach erosion was minimal, and the heavy rainfall did not cause significant flooding. The cost of damage in Guam reached US$25,000. Four minor injuries occurred, and no deaths took place as the storm passed near the island. However, on August 25, after Chaba had begun moving away from Guam, four people were swept to sea by strong rip currents caused by the departing typhoon. Though three of the four were later recovered and treated for injuries, the other person was never found.
- August 31 – September 1, 2005: Typhoon Nabi dropped 115 mm (4.5 in) of rainfall in 24 hours on the island. Flooding covered roads for several hours and entered classrooms at Untalan Middle School, forcing hundreds of students to evacuate. Damage in the region was estimated US$2.5 million.
- December 10, 2008: Typhoon Dolphin produced 2.05 inches of rainfall in 48 hours starting on December 10 at 0100 UTC. Guam government officials reported that there was not much significant damage, with power outages around the island being sporadic which were primarily caused by falling trees and debris. There was also some minor flooding and beach erosion caused by storm tides.
- September 9-10, 2009: Typhoon Choi-wan struck the island of Alamagan with estimated maximum sustained winds of 150 mph. All six residential structures on the island were destroyed, and all the inhabitants were evacuated by the 29th of September. Damage on Agrihan to the north was relatively minor. Total damage was estimated to be $30,000.

=== 2010s ===
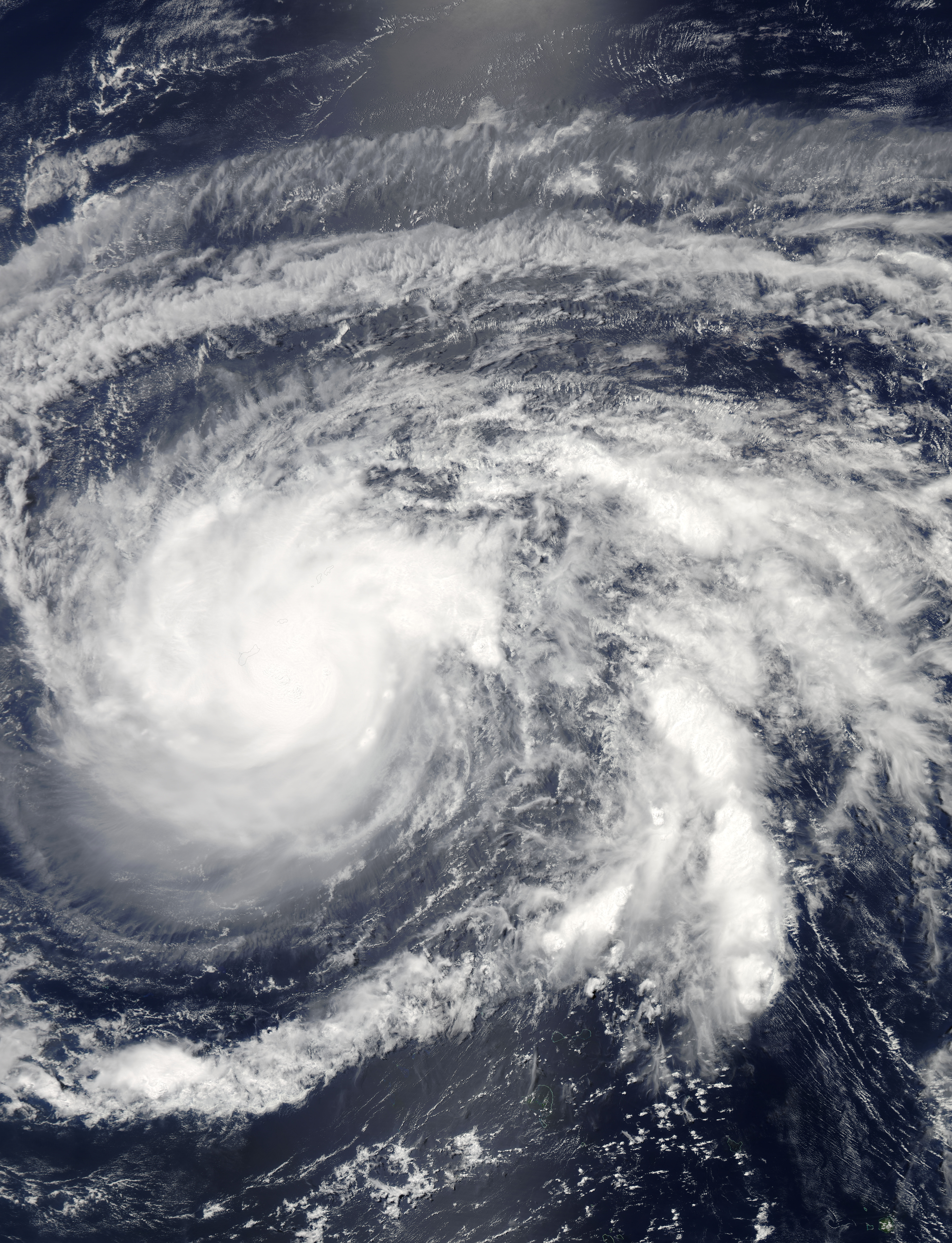
Typhoon Dolphin near Guam on May 15, 2015

- May 22–23, 2012: Tropical Storm Sanvu brought tropical storm force wind gusts and rainfall between 38–51 mm (1.5–2 in) to parts of Guam and the Northern Mariana Islands. However the only damage reported was on Guam where falling tree limbs caused an estimated $20,000 of damage to power lines.
- October 16–19, 2013: Typhoon Francisco passed south of Guam and the Northern Marianas Islands. Gusts on Guam reached 84 km/h (52 mph) at Andersen Air Force Base. Wind gusts were not as strong when the typhoon approached the Mariana Islands for a second time. The typhoon also dropped heavy rainfall on Guam, peaking at 201 mm (7.9 in) at Inarajan. Damage in the region totaled $150,000 (2013 USD), and was largely limited to fallen trees. There was a power outage on Guam during the storm, but the Guam Power Authority was able to quickly restore service; this was due to the first usage of newly installed meters that showed exactly where the cuts had occurred.
- March 4, 2014: Typhoon Faxai's wind and an enhanced wind flow to the north of the typhoon generated large swells, which claimed the life of a woman.
- July 11, 2014: Typhoon Rammasun only made landfall on Guam as a tropical depression, with winds much weaker than earlier anticipated. However, under the system, the island received a substantial amount of rainfall, making that day the wettest in around 3 months. The United States territory received 25 to 50 mm (0.98 to 1.97 in) of rain.
- March 15, 2015: Tropical Storm Bavi's circulation subsequently passed over Guam during March 15, with winds on the island barely reaching gale force on the island. Within Guam, sporadic power outages and minor tree damage were reported, while waves on the uninhabited northeastern coast of Guam reached 20–30 ft (5–10 m) and were the highest waves recorded on the island in a decade.
- May 14–16, 2015: Typhoon Dolphin produced the first typhoon-force winds on the island since 2002 during Typhoon Pongsona. It passed between Guam and Rota, producing gusts of 171 km/h (106 mph) at Andersen Air Force Base on northern Guam. The winds left 40% of the island without power and left at least 3,300 people without water. The storm also dropped heavy rainfall, flooding Guam Memorial Hospital. Dolphin damaged 390 houses, including nine that were destroyed, leaving 1,055 people homeless. With damage estimated at $10 million, the island was declared a disaster area.
- July 5, 2015: Typhoon Chan-hom's wind gusts were recorded at 117 km/h (73 mph). Rainfall on the island totaled over 300 mm (12 in), based on radar estimates from the University of Guam, and possibly as high as 410 mm (16 in). On Guam, the storm caused minor power outages and flooding.
- July 9, 2015: Typhoon Nangka passed over the island Alamagan with 145 mph (233 km/h) winds. Rough surf and coastal flooding caused property damage estimated at $1 million in Guam.
- August 8–9, 2015: Typhoon Soudelor struck Saipan with estimated sustained winds of 130 mph. 40 people were injured on the island and damage totaled $20 million. 50% of the power distribution system was destroyed. Two people drowned near Guam in separate incidents due to rip currents produced by the storm.
- August 15–17, 2015: Typhoon Goni impacted the territory with recorded sustained winds of 80 km/h (50 mph) and gusts up to 93 km/h (58 mph). The storm's slow movement enabled heavy rain to fall over Guam, totaling 345 mm (13.58 in) at the NWS office near the center of the island; this was enough rainfall to cause flooding, particularly on the western side of Guam. The concurrence of heavy rainfall and gusty winds caused isolated power outages on the island, with floods temporarily shutting down the Tumon power sub-station. Increased water flow along the Ugum River shut down the Ugum Water Treatment Plant, leaving some residents without water access.
- April 3, 2018: Typhoon Jelawat's remnants produced rip currents and strong surfs that drowned a woman, before she was rescued along with two other swimmers.
- July 5, 2018: Typhoon Maria damaged a number of KC-135 aircraft in Andersen Air Force Base when passing near Guam as a tropical storm on July 5. The air base recorded an unusually high wind gust of 154 km/h (96 mph) associated with the passage of a mesoscale convective vortex and an embedded hot tower—features that often support rapid intensification of tropical cyclones. An islandwide power outage occurred on July 5 after gusty winds downed power lines, and the local weather radar was knocked out. Damage on the island was estimated at US$150,000.
- September 11, 2018: Typhoon Mangkhut passed near Guam, causing about 80% of the island to lose electricity. The typhoon caused $4.3 million in infrastructural damage in Guam.
- October 25, 2018: Typhoon Yutu made landfall over Tinian with estimated sustained winds of 175 miles per hour (282 km/h) and a minimum central pressure of 905 mbar (26.72 inHg). One person was indirectly killed from the storm due to carbon monoxide poisoning. Over 1000 buildings were damaged or destroyed, including the power plants on Tinian and Saipan.
- February 23–25, 2019: Typhoon Wutip caused isolated power outages. Wutip's closest point of approach was on the 24th, when it was about 266 kilometres (165 mi) south of the island. Wutip had dumped 43 cm (17 in) of rain in Inarajan, 30 cm (12 in) in Dandan, and 15 to 20 cm (6 to 8 in) elsewhere in the island. Inarajan experienced more significant damage, with obstructed roads and many downed trees and power lines along with major flooding. No injury or serious damage were reported. Preliminary damage in infrastructure for Wutip totaled $1.3 million.
- October 5-10, 2019: The eye of Typhoon Hagibis passed over the unpopulated island of Anatahan with estimated sustained winds of 160 miles per hour (260 km/h). The islands of Tinian, Saipan, Pagan and Alamagan experienced category 1 typhoon winds, while other islands experienced tropical storm winds. Crop damage on Guam was estimated to be $90,000.

=== 2020s ===
Satellite loop of Typhoon Mawar as it made its closest approach to Guam on May 24, 2023

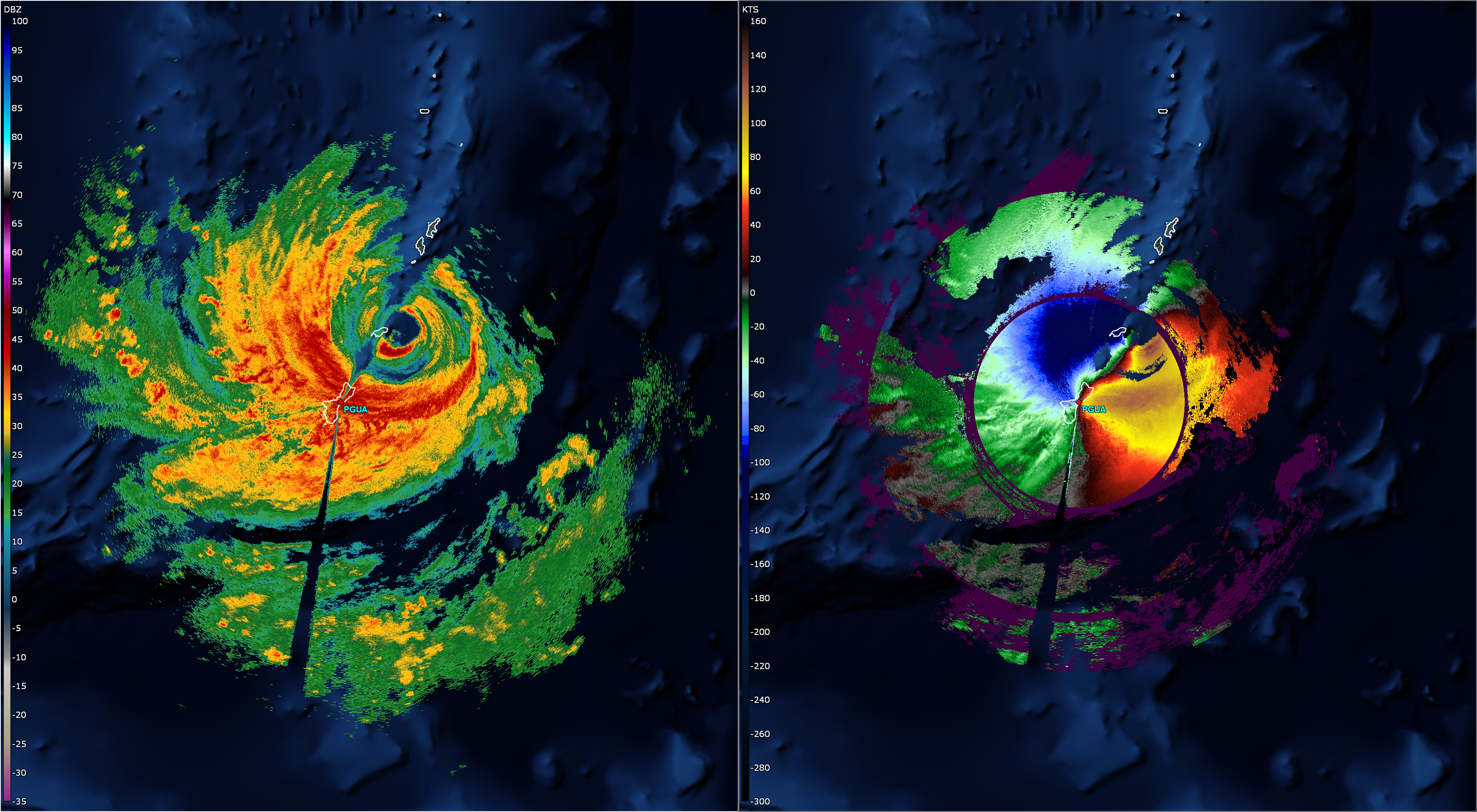
Two-panel radar frame from Guam-based radar, PGUA, showing Typhoon Bavi at landfall. The left panel is base reflectivity, which shows rainfall intensity. The right panel is storm-relative velocity, which shows wind direction and speed.

- June 22, 2021: Typhoon Champi prompted the issuance of tropical storm warning for the entirety of Guam. Electrical disruptions occurred in Chalan Pago, Toto/Canada, and Santa Rita due to the system's near approach. As it moved away from the island and the Marianas, the watch and warning in those areas were lifted at 01:00 UTC on June 22.
- May 22–25, 2023: Typhoon Mawar impacted the island with winds of 140 mph (225 km/h) and a pressure of 924 mbar (27.29 inHg). A United States Geological Survey rain gauge in Dededo, Guam measured the most rainfall at 28.42 inches (72.2 cm). Overall structural damage was relatively limited. Two men were swept out to sea off Guam in separate incidents on May 25. U.S. President Joe Biden declared Guam a major disaster area on May 27, enabling the distribution of federal funds.
- October 10, 2023: Typhoon Bolaven's wind gusts of 80 km/h (50 mph) were recorded at Antonio B. Won Pat International Airport. Businesses in Guam were closed in preparations of the storm. The Guam Power Authority reported power outages, though they were able to repair and restore power within 30 minutes. Minor flooding and damage was reported in Inalåhan. Guam Governor Lou Leon Guerrero issued a state of emergency which was later approved by Joe Biden, but it was limited, and no federal aid was provided to the island.
- September 11, 2024: Tropical Storm Bebinca passed to the south of Guam initializing a tropical storm warning across the entire island.
- April 14, 2026: Just before midnight, Typhoon Sinlaku made landfall on Saipan and Tinian islands as a violent typhoon, which is one of the strongest to do so since Typhoon Yutu in 2018.
- July 5, 2026: Typhoon Bavi made landfall on the island of Rota equivalent to a Category 5 super typhoon, becoming one of the strongest landfalls in the history of the Northern Mariana Islands, with JTWC assessing its 1-minute sustained winds of 285 km/h (180 mph) and a central pressure of 901 hPa (mbar); 26.61 inHg.
- September 27 – October 4, 2026– Typhoon Choi-wan tracks directly across the Northern Mariana Islands as an intensifying tropical storm. The system passes near Saipan and Tinian, generating tropical storm-force wind gusts exceeding 50 mph (80 km/h) and localized heavy rainfall totals up to 8 in (200 mm). The storm causes minor structural damage, localized flooding, and temporary disruptions to local maritime transit before rapidly intensifying over the open Western Pacific. A tropical storm warning was placed in effect prompting government agencies with the exemption of essential personnel to shut down.
- October 18, 2026 – Typhoon Champi grazes past Rota & Guam.

== Climatology ==
Storms Affecting Guam and/or Mariana Islands by month
Month	Number of Storms
January	2
February	3
March	3
April	7
May	8
June	3
July	9
August	12
September	11
October	12
November	15
December	9

== Tables ==
Wettest tropical cyclones and their remnants in the Northern Marianas Islands Highest-known totals
Precipitation			Storm	Location	Ref.
Rank	mm	in	Storm	Location	Ref.
1	666.8	26.25	Champi 2015	Tinian	
2	487.6	19.20	Steve 1993	Saipan	
3	241.3	9.50	Seth 1991	Saipan	
4	205.7	8.10	Soulik 2006	Pagan	
5	173.2	6.82	Nabi 2005	Saipan	
6	119.1	4.69	Bavi 2015	Tinian	
7	118.1	4.65	Sanvu 2012	Tinian	
8	90.9	3.58	Kong-rey 2007	Pagan	
9	85.8	3.38	Mirinae 2009	Rota	
10	82.5	3.25	Melor 2009	Tinian	

Wettest tropical cyclones and their remnants on Guam Highest-known totals
Precipitation			Storm	Location	Ref.
Rank	mm	in	Storm	Location	Ref.
1	856.0	33.70	Pamela 1976	Guam WSMO	
2	846.8	33.34	Alice 1953	Andersen Air Force Base	
3	840.5	33.09	Unnamed 1924	Guam WSMO	
4	771.9	28.42	Mawar 2023	Dededo	
5	650.5	25.61	Pongsona 2002	University of Guam	
6	610.4	24.03	Tingting 2004	Inarajan Agricultural Station	
7	539.5	21.24	Paka 1997	Guam WSMO	
8	533.0	21.00	Chataan 2002	South-central Guam	
9	519.2	20.44	Omar 1992	Guam WSMO	
10	423.9	16.69	Halong 2014	Andersen Air Force Base	
