= Typhoon Bavi (2026) =

Pacific typhoon in 2026

Typhoon Bavi (Inday)
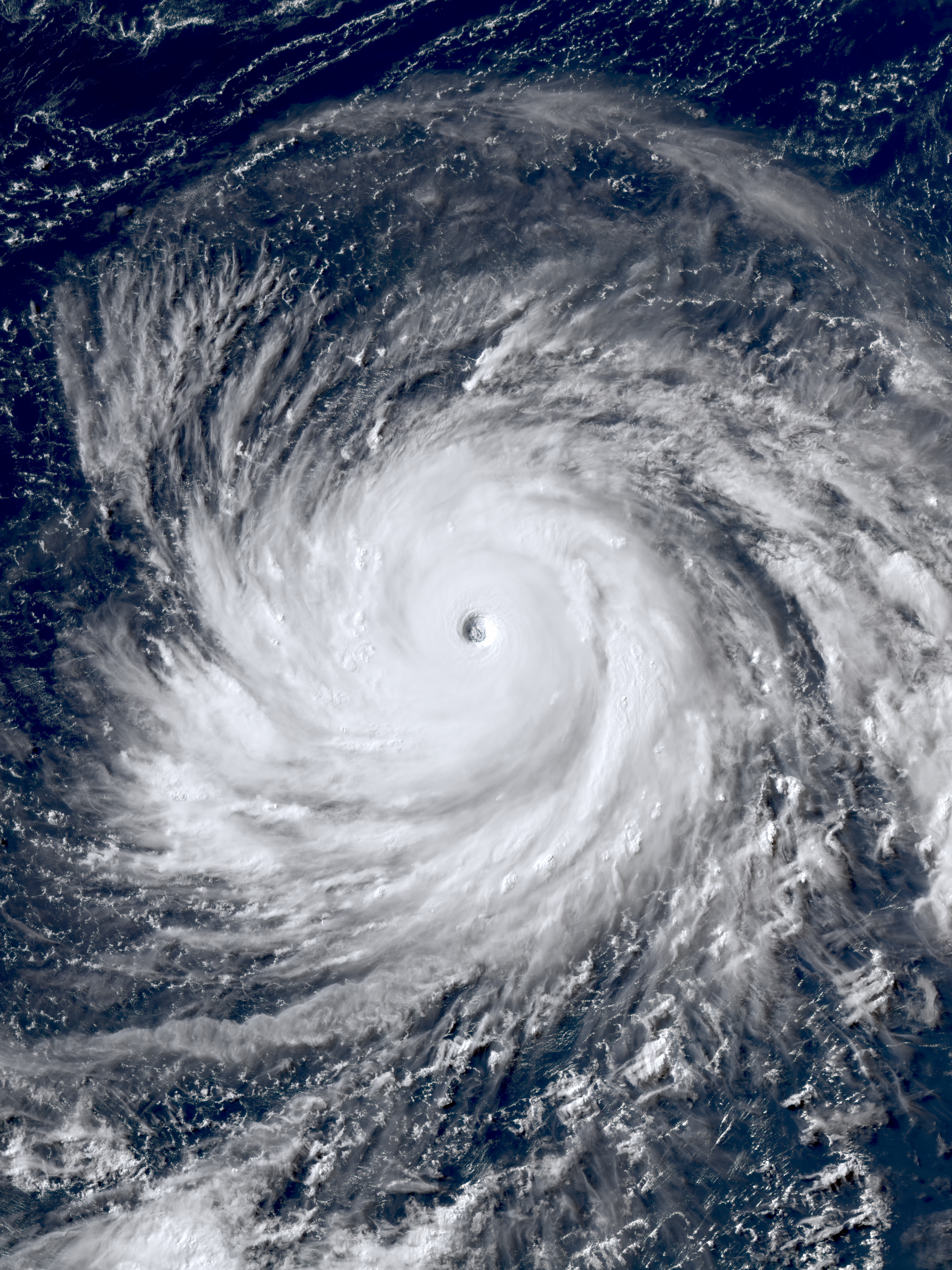
- Bavi near peak intensity before narrowly swiping Rota early on July 5

Meteorological history
- Formed: June 30, 2026
- Extratropical: July 15, 2026
- Dissipated: July 16, 2026

Violent typhoon
- 10-minute sustained (JMA)
- Highest winds: 215 km/h (130 mph)
- Lowest pressure: 900 hPa (mbar); 26.58 inHg

Category 5-equivalent super typhoon
- 1-minute sustained (SSHWS/JTWC)
- Highest winds: 285 km/h (180 mph)
- Lowest pressure: 901 hPa (mbar); 26.61 inHg

Overall effects
- Fatalities: 23+
- Injuries: 163+
- Missing: 14+
- Damage: ≥$141 million (2026 USD)
- Areas affected: Marshall Islands; United States Pacific Islands (particularly Northern Mariana Islands, and Guam); Caroline Islands; Philippines; Ryukyu Islands; Taiwan; East China; Korea; Russian Far East
- Part of the 2026 Pacific typhoon season

Typhoon Bavi, (Note: The name Bavi (Vietnamese: Ba Vì, [ʔɓaː˧˧ vi˨˩]) was contributed by Vietnam and refers to the Ba Vì mountain range in Vietnamese.) known in the Philippines as Inday, was an extremely powerful, large, and long-lived tropical cyclone that affected the Northern Mariana Islands, Guam, the Philippines, China, and parts of Taiwan in early July 2026. The ninth named tropical storm, third typhoon and second violent typhoon of the 2026 Pacific typhoon season, Bavi was the second violent typhoon of the season to affect the Mariana Islands, after Typhoon Sinlaku made landfall on Tinian in April.

The origins of Bavi started as a disturbance just east-southeast of Kwajalein on June 25, over favorable conditions. Seven days later, the Joint Typhoon Warning Center (JTWC) designated the disturbance as Tropical Depression 09W. It later received the name Bavi by the Japan Meteorological Agency (JMA) early on July 2 as it continued to organize over very warm sea surface temperatures and low vertical wind shear. Both agencies later upgraded Bavi into a typhoon as it quickly intensified. Rapid intensification ensued, and Bavi became a super typhoon less than a day later as a Category 5-equivalent typhoon according to the JTWC. An eyewall replacement cycle ensued causing some slight weakening overnight on July 4, but the typhoon quickly re-strengthened the following day before it made landfall on Rota in Northern Mariana Islands at peak intensity; the JMA estimated maximum sustained winds of 215 km/h (130 mph) and a central pressure of 900 hPa (27 inHg), while the JTWC assessed peak 1-minute sustained winds of 285 km/h (180 mph) and central pressure of 901 hPa (26.6 inHg). Late on July 7, PAGASA gave the local name Inday even though it was about to enter the Philippine Area of Responsibility (PAR) until it did so at 03:00 PHT of July 8 (19:45 UTC of the previous day). The storm made a final landfall in Zhejiang at tropical storm-equivalent intensity on July 11 before eventually curving towards the Yellow Sea, dissipating on July 16.

Bavi triggered heavy rains and landslides that killed 23 people and left 18 missing across the Philippines. Injuries were also recorded in Guam, the Ryukyu Islands in Japan, the Northern Mariana Islands and Taiwan.

== Meteorological history ==
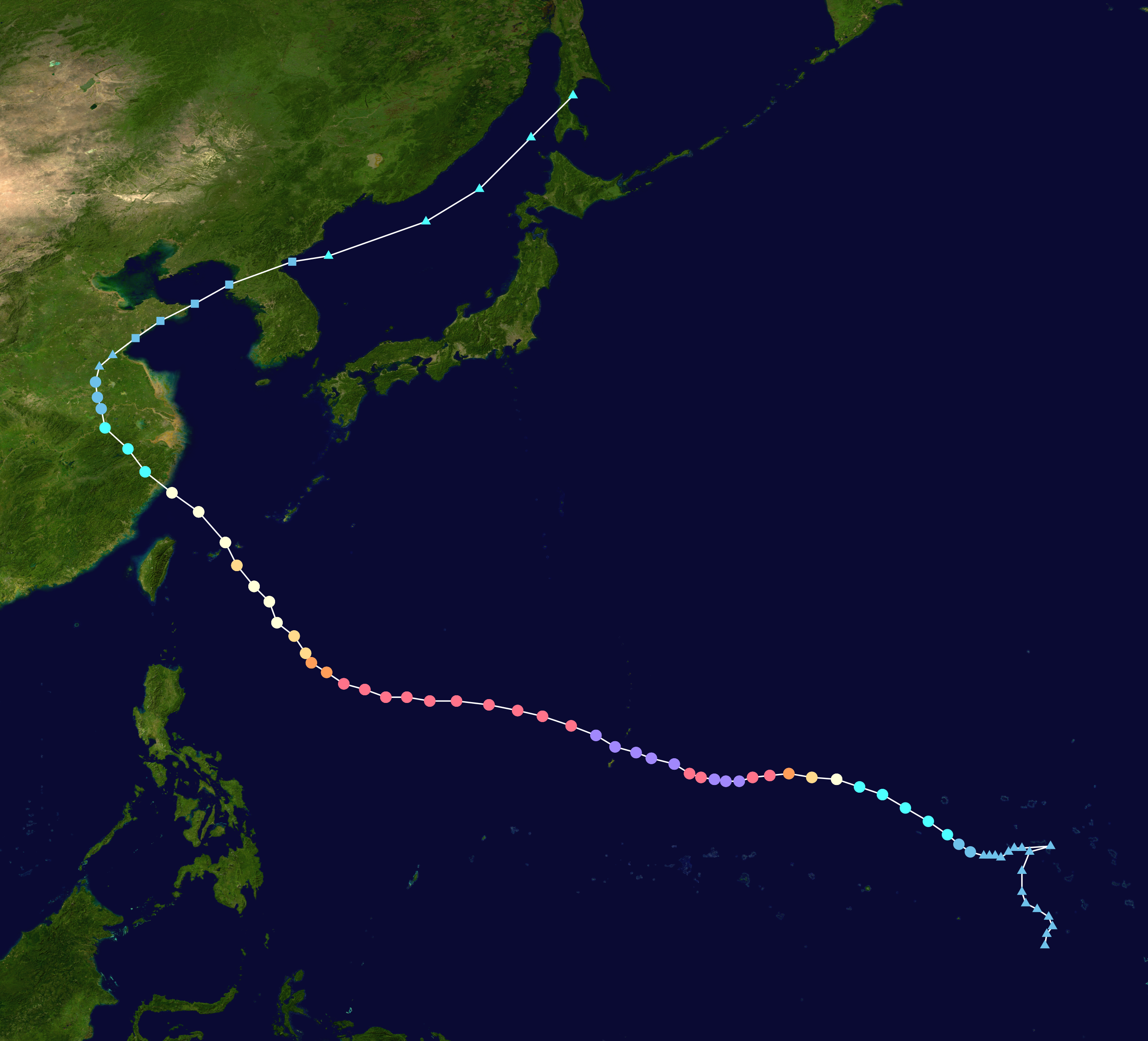
Map plotting the storm's track and intensity, according to the Saffir–Simpson scale Map key Saffir–Simpson scale Tropical depression (≤38 mph, ≤62 km/h) Tropical storm (39–73 mph, 63–118 km/h) Category 1 (74–95 mph, 119–153 km/h) Category 2 (96–110 mph, 154–177 km/h) Category 3 (111–129 mph, 178–208 km/h) Category 4 (130–156 mph, 209–251 km/h) Category 5 (≥157 mph, ≥252 km/h) Unknown Storm type Tropical cyclone Subtropical cyclone Extratropical cyclone, remnant low, tropical disturbance, or monsoon depression

On June 25, 2026, the Joint Typhoon Warning Center (JTWC) marked a low-pressure area that formed 901 nautical miles (1,669 km; 1,037 mi) east-southeast of Kwajalein, with satellite imagery indicated that the disturbance was in a favorable development for tropical cyclogenesis. Four days later, at 13:00 UTC, the Joint Typhoon Warning Center (JTWC) issued a Tropical Cyclone Formation Alert (TCFA) for the system, indicated that the disturbance had been gradually intensifying over favorable conditions. Early on July 1, JTWC upgraded the disturbance into a tropical depression, assigning the designation as 09W. At 00:00 UTC on July 2, 09W was upgraded into a tropical storm, gaining the name Bavi by the JMA.

Due to increasingly favorable conditions for tropical development, consisting of sea surface temperatures (SSTs) of 29–30 °C (84–86 °F), low wind shear of 5–10 kn (5.8–11.5 mph; 9.3–18.5 km/h) and high moisture levels, Bavi quickly intensified, with the JTWC upgrading Bavi to a typhoon at 18:00 UTC that day, with the JMA following suit six hours later. Bavi then began a period of explosive intensification, with the JTWC assessing the system's 1-minute sustained winds increasing from 70 kn (80 mph; 130 km/h) at 18:00 UTC July 2 to 125 kn (145 mph; 230 km/h) at 12:00 UTC July 3, in only 18 hours, making it a Category 4-equivalent typhoon, as a well-defined eye quickly emerged within a sharply defined central dense overcast (CDO) surrounding it. The outflow also expanded massively and improved in all quadrants. At the same time, the JMA upgraded Bavi to a very strong typhoon.

At 21:00 UTC the same day, JTWC upgraded Bavi into a super typhoon, with estimated 1-minute winds of 145 knots (269 km/h; 167 mph), making it a Category 5-equivalent super typhoon. Later on, JMA upgraded Bavi to a violent typhoon. On July 4, the typhoon weakened slightly due to an eyewall replacement cycle, however by the following day it re-intensified back to a Category 5-equivalent super typhoon. At 08:40 local time on July 6 (22:40 UTC on July 5), Bavi made landfall on the northern coast of the island of Rota at peak intensity, with JTWC assessing its 1-minute sustained winds of 155 knots (287 km/h; 178 mph) and a central pressure of 901 hPa (mbar; 26.61 inHg), becoming one of the strongest typhoons in history to affect the Northern Mariana Islands. However, it remains unclear whether the center of the typhoon's eye has crossed over land or otherwise. On July 7, another eyewall replacement cycle occurred, causing the storm to weaken below super typhoon strength before reintensifying back into a super typhoon. Even though it was still outside the Philippine Area of Responsibility (PAR) on July 7, PAGASA subsequently gave the local name Inday. This was the third time on record after Tropical Storm Pabuk in 2024 and Typhoon Fung-wong in 2025 that PAGASA named a system outside the PAR.

However, on July 9, increasing wind shear and a third eyewall replacement cycle caused the storm to weaken below super typhoon strength as the storm made a sharp turn to the northwest due to a subtropical ridge pulling it in. The system started to gradually weaken, with PAGASA downgrading it to Typhoon status on July 9. The system weakened quicker than originally forecasted and was downgraded to a category 1-equivalent typhoon on July 10 as a result of an incomplete eyewall replacement cycle, combined with the effects of cooler sea surface temperatures and increasing wind shear. As the typhoon proceeded northwest, it continually ballooned in size, and according to the Joint Typhoon Warning Center, Bavi's wind field ranked in the top 3% of all western Pacific typhoons during the previous decade, making it exceptionally large. At around 15:20 UTC on July 11, Bavi made landfall on the Chinese coast near Yuhuan, part of Zhejiang, and a second landfall at Yueqing, part of Wenzhou. Whilst inland, Bavi began to exhibit subtropical characteristics as it interacted with a strong upper-level trough allowing it to maintain a shallow convective pattern, prompting the JTWC to classify the system as a subtropical depression. On the following day, the JMA declared that Bavi had transitioned into an extratropical low. The remnants of Bavi accelerated to the northeast as it passed over the Korean Peninsula and traversed through the Sea of Japan before being absorbed by a larger low-pressure area towards the north of Hokkaido.

== Preparations ==
=== China ===
==== Mainland ====
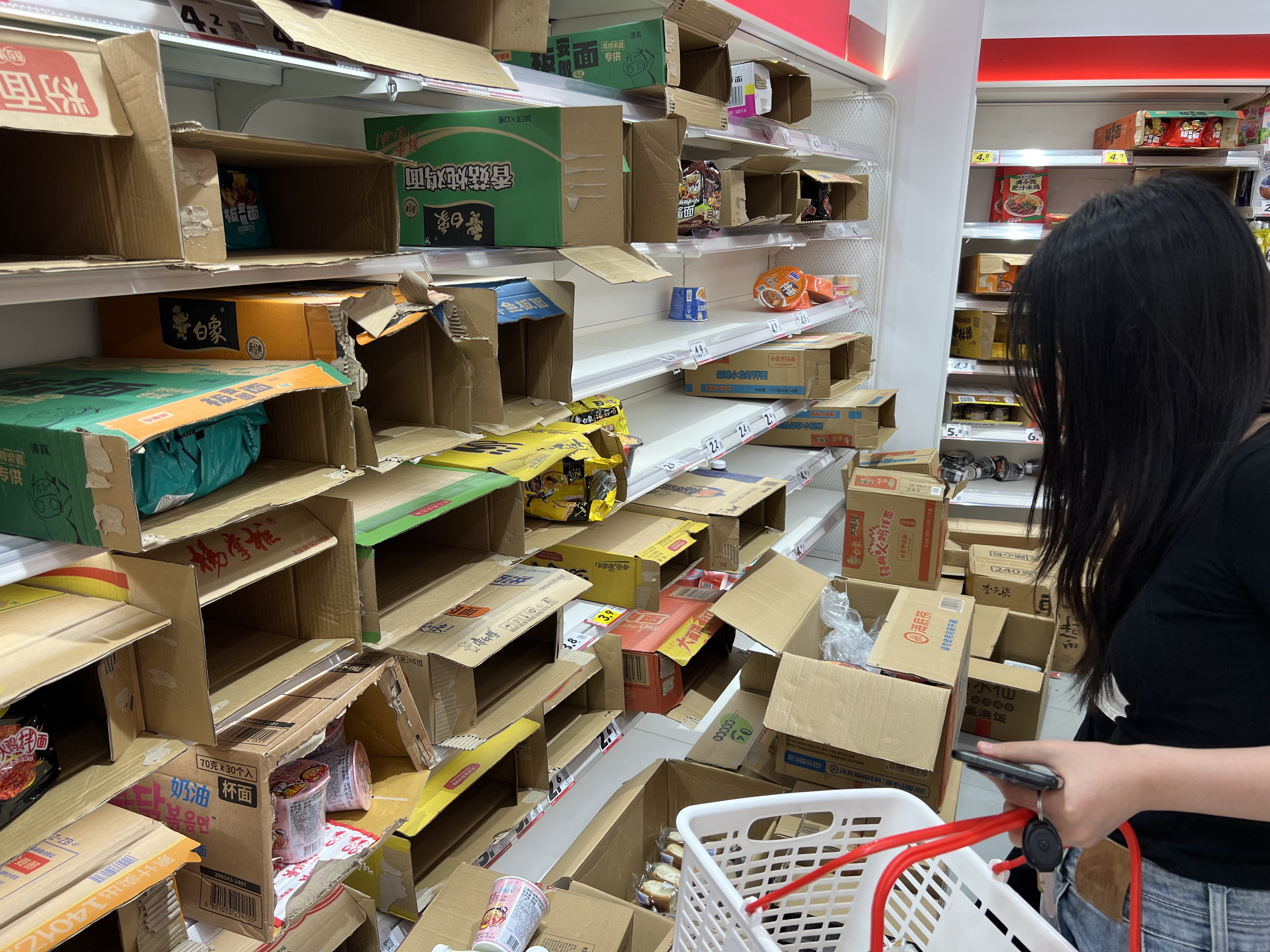
Panic buying at a snack shop in Hangzhou due to Typhoon Bavi

On July 8, the National Meteorological Center (NWC) issued a blue warning for a typhoon (lowest tier) for Fujian and Zhejiang provinces in China. On July 10, China's State Flood Control and Drought Relief Headquarters raised the emergency response for flood control and typhoon prevention in Zhejiang and Fujian from Level III to Level II under the nation's four-tier system, while activating a Level IV response for Hebei and Liaoning. The Ministry of Emergency Management dispatched working groups to Zhejiang and Fujian to guide local response efforts. Ahead of landfall, Zhejiang water resources authorities initiated a Level IV emergency response and maritime safety authorities activated a Level III response. Coastal regions were ordered to recall fishing vessels to port, evacuate offshore platform workers, and reinforce infrastructure against destructive winds; coastal tourist destinations were placed on high alert, with authorities advised to suspend operations if necessary. The public was urged to monitor forecasts, avoid travel, and prepare emergency supplies.

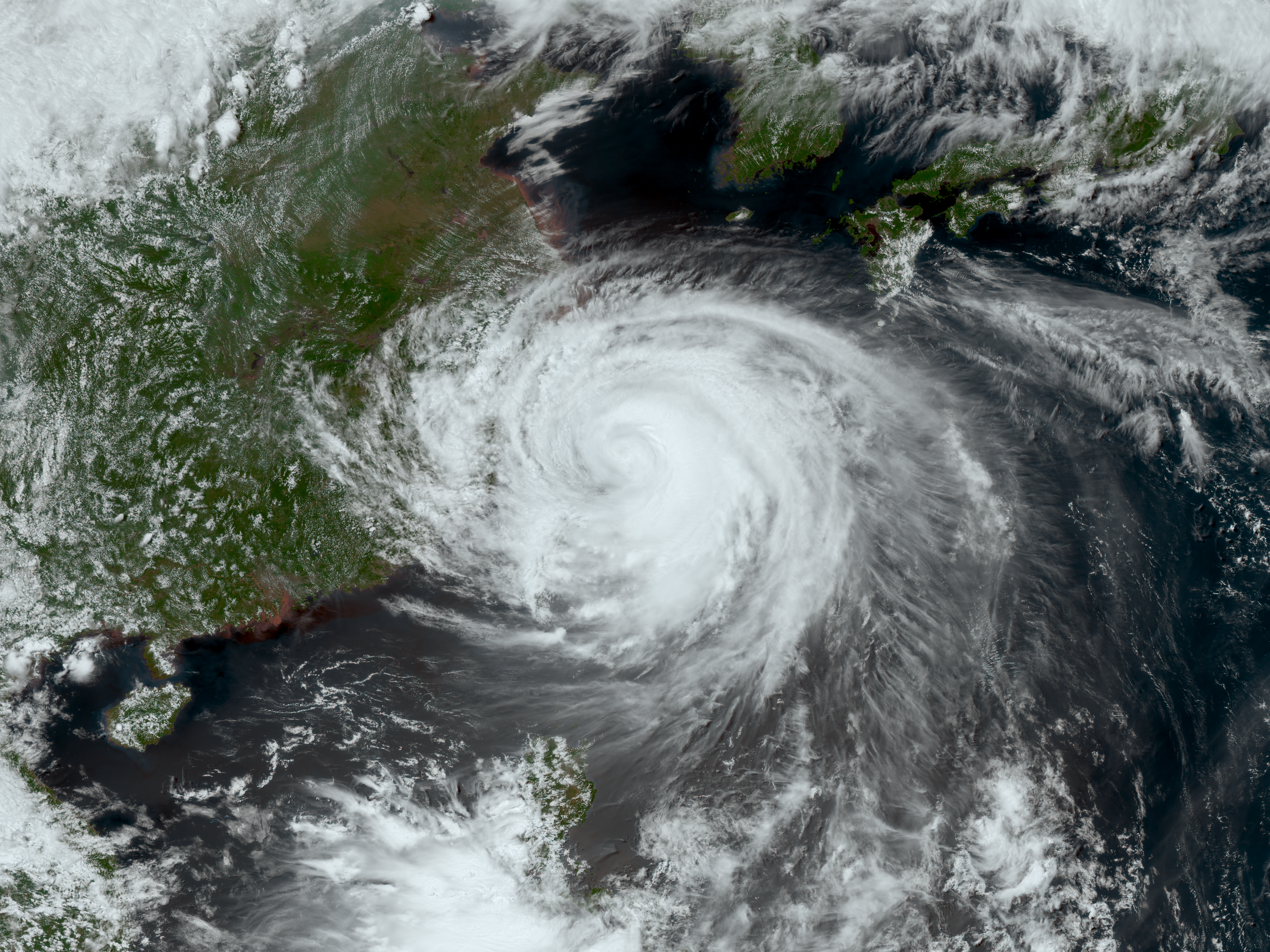
Bavi approaching eastern China on July 11

==== Hong Kong ====
The outer subsiding air stream of Bavi brought extremely hot weather to Hong Kong, with temperatures rising up to 35 °C (95 °F) over the weekend. The Hong Kong Observatory warned the public of dangerous coastal swells and monitored the tightening pressure gradient to determine if a Strong Monsoon Signal was required as local winds veered southwesterly. The storm caused significant travel disruptions; dozens of weekend flights to Taiwan, the mainland of China, and Japan operated by local carriers were cancelled. Additionally, cross-border rail infrastructure was affected, leading to the cancellation of several high-speed rail services between Hong Kong West Kowloon and Shanghai. Contingency plans were also highlighted for the upcoming release of the Hong Kong Diploma of Secondary Education (HKDSE) examination results, which faced potential postponement if severe weather conditions persisted into the following week.

=== Taiwan ===
At Fugang Fishing Harbor in Taitung, more than 10 fishing boat owners hired a crane to lift inflatable fishing rafts onto the shore to protect them from strong winds and waves, as previous typhoons had caused vessels to collide in the harbor.

Officials warned of wind gusts of 133–149 km/h (83–93 mph) and as much as 400 mm (16 in) of accumulated rainfall during the peak of the storm, with mountainous areas facing risk of extremely heavy rain. President Lai Ching-te urged people in a Facebook post to prepare supplies from food to torches, and posted a video teaching people how to pull together an emergency grab bag that could give life support for three days.

=== Guam ===
On July 2, Guam Governor Lou Leon Guerrero declared a state of emergency as territory officials began preparing for Bavi. Two days later, a typhoon warning was issued for Guam and surrounding islands. Emergency evacuations were carried out on July 5. Authorities said the island could see 8–12 inches (200–300 mm) of precipitation, resulting in potential flash floods. All flights were canceled at main airports in Guam and operations were suspended at several ports.

=== Northern Mariana Islands ===
An extreme wind warning was issued for Rota, with widespread destructive winds in excess of 150 miles per hour (240 km/h) expected. The National Weather Service warned that going outside could result in death from flying projectiles, with unreinforced structures being destroyed and utility poles and power lines being downed. They added that nearly all trees will be snapped or uprooted, power outages will last for weeks to possibly months and much of the area will be uninhabitable for weeks, perhaps longer. Emergency evacuations were carried out on July 5. On July 6, Typhoon Bavi became the strongest tropical cyclone on record to strike U.S. territory.

=== Philippines ===
Even though Bavi was still outside the Philippine Area of Responsibility (PAR), the typhoon was given the local name Inday. PAGASA raised Tropical Cyclone Warning Signal No. 1 over the northeastern portion of Cagayan (later the whole province). The agency also subsequently raised Signal No. 1 over Apayao, Babuyan Islands, Batanes, northern and central portions of Catanduanes and Isabela, and the northern portion of Aurora when Bavi entered PAR. Signal number 2 was later raised over Batanes and eastern Babuyan Islands, while signal no. 1 was extended to Ilocos Norte, Kalinga, and parts of Abra, Ifugao, Mountain Province and Quirino. All wind signals were lifted after Bavi exited the PAR on July 11.

== Impact ==
Casualties and damages by country/region
Country	Deaths	Missing	Damages (USD)	Source
China	0	0	>$124 million	
Northern Mariana Islands	0	0	Unknown	
Guam	0	0	Unknown	
Philippines	23	14	>$3.95 million	
Taiwan	0	0	>$2.66 million	
Japan	0	0	>$10.2 million	
Total	23	14	>$141 million	

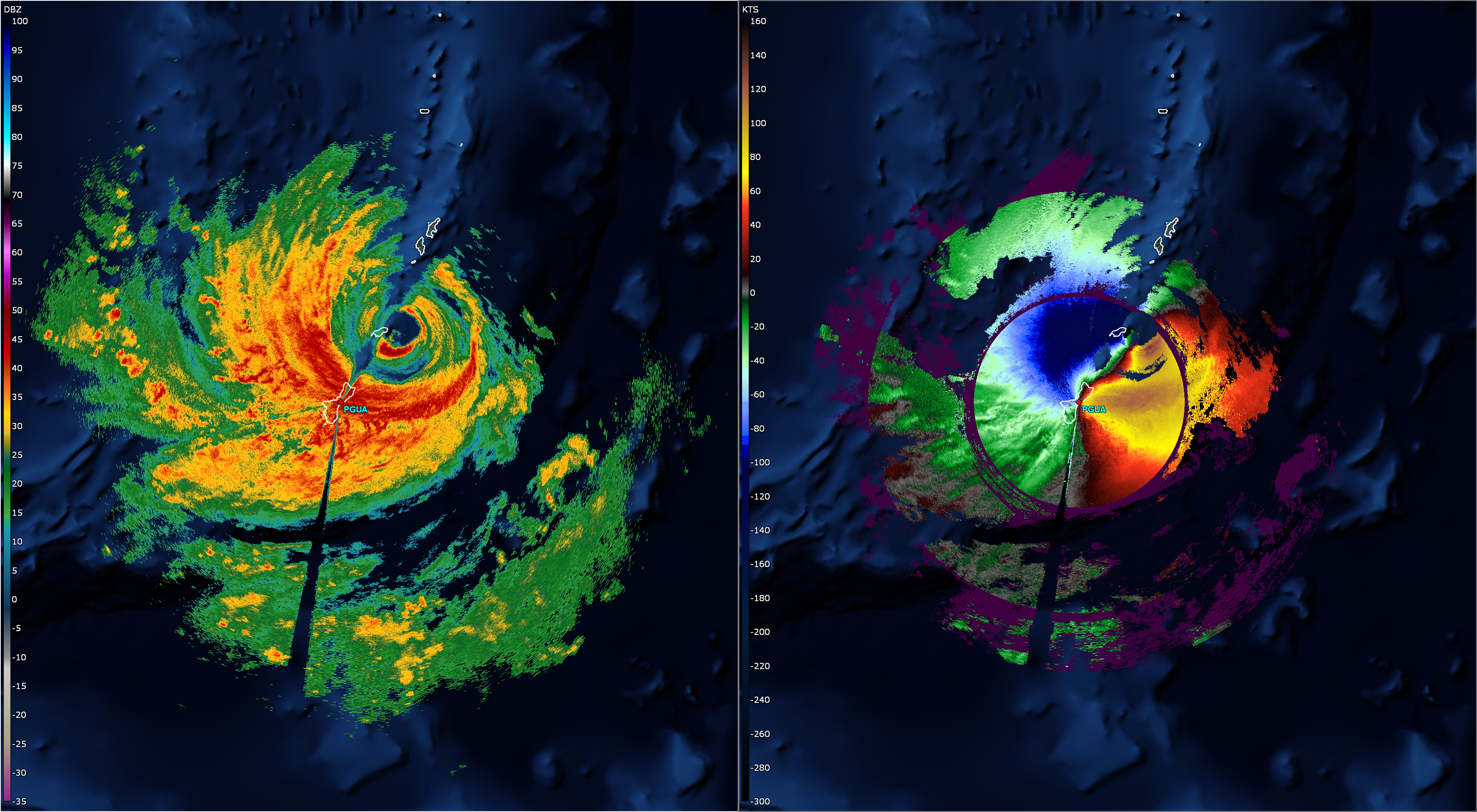
Two-panel radar frame from Guam-based radar, PGUA, showing Typhoon Bavi at landfall. The left panel is base reflectivity, which shows rainfall intensity. The right panel is storm-relative velocity, which shows wind direction and speed.

=== Guam ===
On Guam, the typhoon caused torrential rains and hurricane-force winds. At least four injuries were reported.

=== Northern Mariana Islands ===
==== Rota ====
The center of the typhoon passed only 2 mi (3.2 km) off the northern coast of Rota on July 6, bringing torrential rains and extremely strong Category 5 winds. The island's mayor, Aubry Hocog, reported that about half of the structures were damaged or destroyed, and that it could take up to three months to fully restore power to the island due to many, and possibly all, of Rota's wooden utility poles being damaged or destroyed. In addition, according to Senator Donald M. Manglona, supplies of electrical equipment had already been depleted in Saipan and Tinian during recovery efforts following Typhoon Sinlaku in April, further complicating electrical repairs on Rota. A communications tower was leveled, causing cell phone services to go offline. Hocog also described the island as destroyed "in every aspect," noting that all public facilities, including airports and seaports, were damaged. The island's main airport, Benjamin Taisacan Manglona International Airport, was among the most heavily damaged pieces of infrastructure, with no clear timeline for when full operations could resume. Temporary reinforced tin roofs installed for residents after the passage of Sinlaku months earlier were not able to withstand the high winds and were also easily destroyed. Long queues formed waiting to receive clean drinking water, as many pipelines were left unusable. Storm chaser Jordan Hall, who documented and photographed images of the damage in Rota, compared the deforestation on the island to that of a high-end EF4-EF5 tornado. 2 people were reportedly injured, with no fatalities.

==== Saipan and Tinian ====
All 16,683 electrical customers on Saipan and Tinian lost electricity. 439 people were relocated to shelters. Both islands also faced a gasoline shortage, as the United States Coast Guard struggled to reopen commercial ports. Water service was almost completely interrupted on Saipan as only 0.3% of customers retained service immediately after the typhoon. All flights were canceled at main airports and operations were suspended at several ports. On Tinian, Francisco Manglona Borja International Airport sustained damage to its terminal building and perimeter fencing but was quickly re-cleared for operation. Only very minor damage was reported to transportation infrastructure on Saipan. Utility officials stated that no power poles were knocked down on Saipan, with damage largely limited to leaning poles and damaged distribution lines. There were no reported deaths or injuries.

=== Philippines ===
Bavi triggered heavy rains and landslides that killed at least 23 people, injured eight others and left 18 others missing across the Philippines. Around 782,874 people were directly affected, of which 24,000 where displaced. The storm damaged 1,202 houses and 41 infrastructure facilities. In the village of Pandaw in Malapatan, Sarangani, heavy rains attributed to Bavi, combined with weakened soil from the 2026 Mindanao earthquake, caused a landslide that killed 10 people. Another landslide attributed to Bavi's rains killed seven people, injured two others and left four missing in Calanogas, Lanao del Sur, three deaths, five injuries and three missing in Bukidnon. A state of calamity was subsequently declared in Calanogas.

=== Japan ===
In Okinawa Prefecture, Bavi resulted in 12 minor injuries and the evacuation of 82,939 people.

=== Taiwan ===
Bavi brought prolonged heavy rainfall and flooding to northern Taiwan. Taiwan's fire department said on July 12 that 134 people had been injured. The transport ministry said 137 international flights and 62 domestic ones were canceled.

=== China ===
By the afternoon of July 12, Bavi had moved into eastern Anhui province. The storm is expected to dump heavy to torrential rain across the provinces of Jilin, Liaoning, Hebei, Shandong, Jiangsu and Anhui, exacerbating flood risks in areas that have already been soaked by earlier downpours especially from Tropical Storm Maysak earlier in places like Jiangsu, Anhui and Shandong. In Shenyang, the maximum cumulative rainfall was 223.8 millimetres (8.81 in) on July 13, which breaks the rainfall record in a day in the city.

== Responses ==
The Federal Emergency Management Agency (FEMA) stated that they will support Guam and the Northern Mariana Islands as soon as the typhoon moves through.

== See also ==
- Weather of 2026
- Tropical cyclones in 2026
- List of typhoons in the Mariana Islands
- List of super typhoons
- List of violent typhoons
- Typhoon Winnie (1997) - took a similar path and impacted similar areas
- Typhoon Dolphin (2026) - another powerful Category 5-equivalent typhoon that made landfall near the same area in China around a month later
