= Typhoon Dolphin (2015) =

Pacific typhoon in 2015

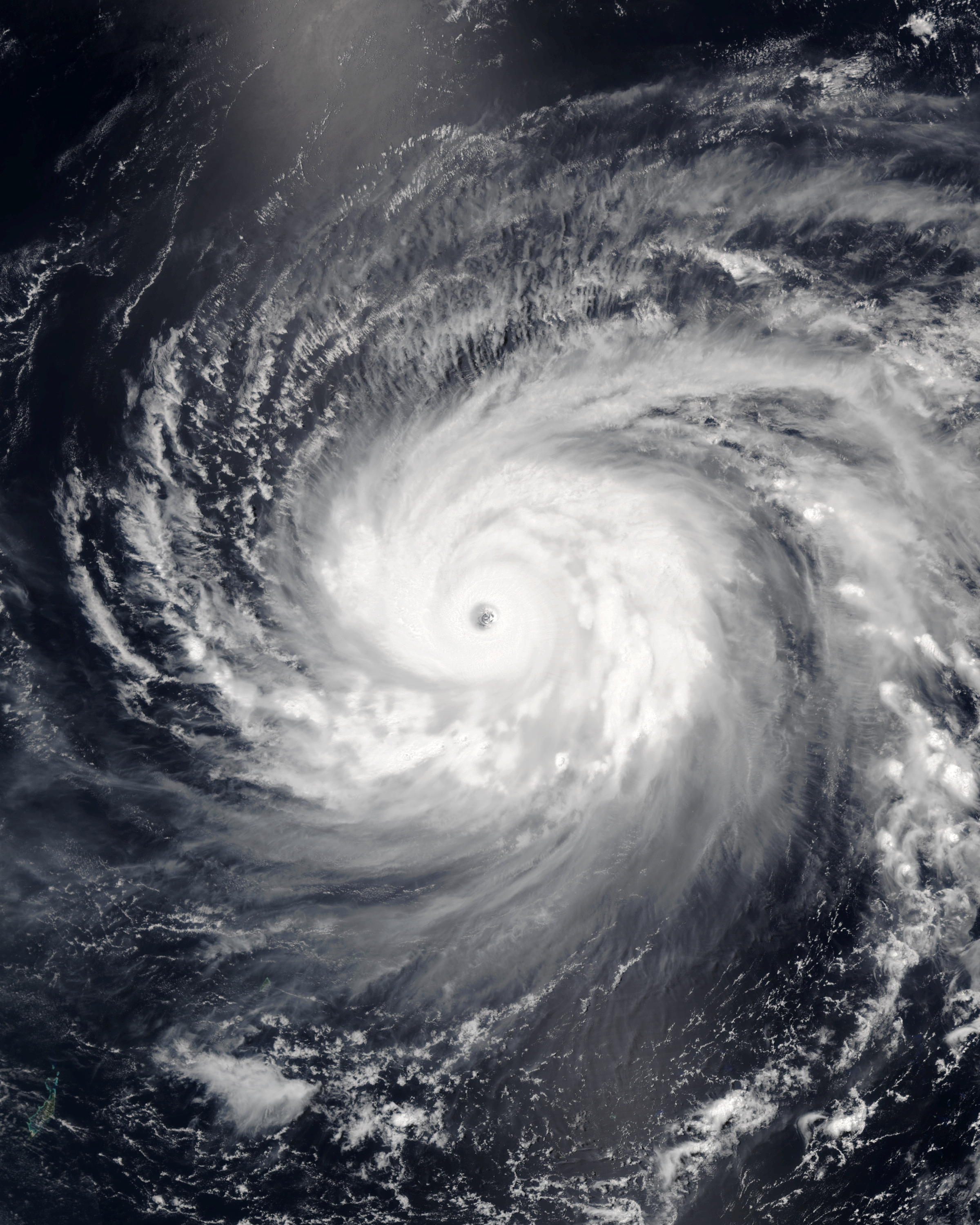
- Typhoon Dolphin shortly before peak intensity on May 16

Meteorological history
- Formed: May 6, 2015
- Extratropical: May 20, 2015
- Dissipated: May 24, 2015

Very strong typhoon
- 10-minute sustained (JMA)
- Highest winds: 185 km/h (115 mph)
- Lowest pressure: 925 hPa (mbar); 27.32 inHg

Category 5-equivalent super typhoon
- 1-minute sustained (SSHWS/JTWC)
- Highest winds: 260 km/h (160 mph)
- Lowest pressure: 918 hPa (mbar); 27.11 inHg

Overall effects
- Fatalities: 1 direct
- Damage: $13.5 million (2015 USD)
- Areas affected: Caroline Islands, Mariana Islands, Kamchatka Peninsula, Alaska
- IBTrACS
- Part of the 2015 Pacific typhoon season

Typhoon Dolphin was a powerful tropical cyclone that produced the first typhoon-force winds on Guam since Typhoon Pongsona in 2002. The seventh named storm of the 2015 Pacific typhoon season, Dolphin formed on May 6 in the vicinity of the Federated States of Micronesia (FSM). Moving eastward at first, the storm slowly organized before beginning a north and west-northwest trajectory. Dolphin intensified into a typhoon before passing between Guam and Rota on May 15, producing typhoon-force winds on both islands. It later rapidly intensified as it curved to the north. The American-based Joint Typhoon Warning Center (JTWC) designated Dolphin as a super typhoon, while the Japan Meteorological Agency (JMA) estimated 10 minute sustained winds of 185 km/h (115 mph). Dolphin turned to the northeast and weakened, becoming extratropical on May 20 and exiting the western Pacific basin on May 24.

The storm first affected the FSM, notably Pohnpei where it dropped 603 mm (23.73 in) of rainfall over three days. The rains and gusty winds knocked down many trees on the island, one of which killed a person, and causing $1 million in damage (2015 USD). Dolphin passed between Guam and Rota, producing gusts of 171 km/h (106 mph) at Andersen Air Force Base on northern Guam. The winds left 40% of the island without power and left at least 3,300 people without water. The storm also dropped heavy rainfall, flooding Guam Memorial Hospital. Dolphin damaged 390 houses, including nine that were destroyed, leaving 1,055 people homeless. With damage estimated at $10 million, the island was declared a disaster area. The typhoon also brushed Rota, causing $2.5 million in damage there, as well as Saipan.

== Meteorological history ==
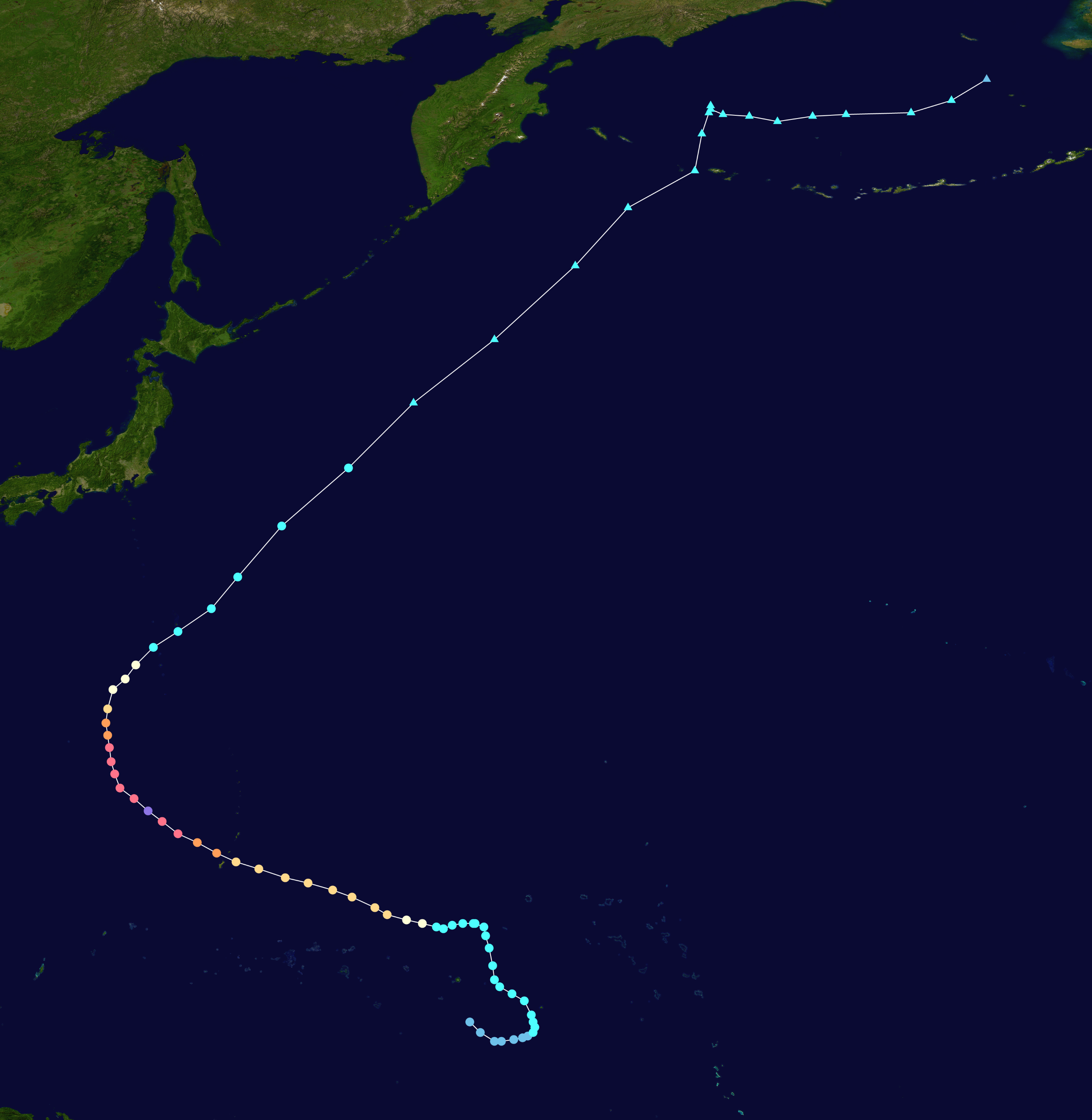
Map plotting the storm's track and intensity, according to the Saffir–Simpson scale Map key Saffir–Simpson scale Tropical depression (≤38 mph, ≤62 km/h) Tropical storm (39–73 mph, 63–118 km/h) Category 1 (74–95 mph, 119–153 km/h) Category 2 (96–110 mph, 154–177 km/h) Category 3 (111–129 mph, 178–208 km/h) Category 4 (130–156 mph, 209–251 km/h) Category 5 (≥157 mph, ≥252 km/h) Unknown Storm type Tropical cyclone Subtropical cyclone Extratropical cyclone, remnant low, tropical disturbance, or monsoon depression

The origins of Dolphin were related to a strong westerly wind burst that also led to the formation of previous Typhoon Noul. Early on May 5, the Joint Typhoon Warning Center (JTWC) began monitoring an area of deep convection approximately 300 km (190 mi) southwest of Pohnpei. It had a poorly defined circulation and broad rainbands, while low to moderate wind shear and warm sea surface temperatures favored development. The convection quickly became better organized and more concentrated around the broad center, aided by increased outflow. The Japan Meteorological Agency (JMA) classified the system as a tropical depression at 06:00 UTC on May 6 about 325 km (202 mi) southwest of Pohnpei. At 21:00 UTC that day, the Joint Typhoon Warning Center (JTWC) also began issuing advisories on the system, classifying it as Tropical Depression 07W.

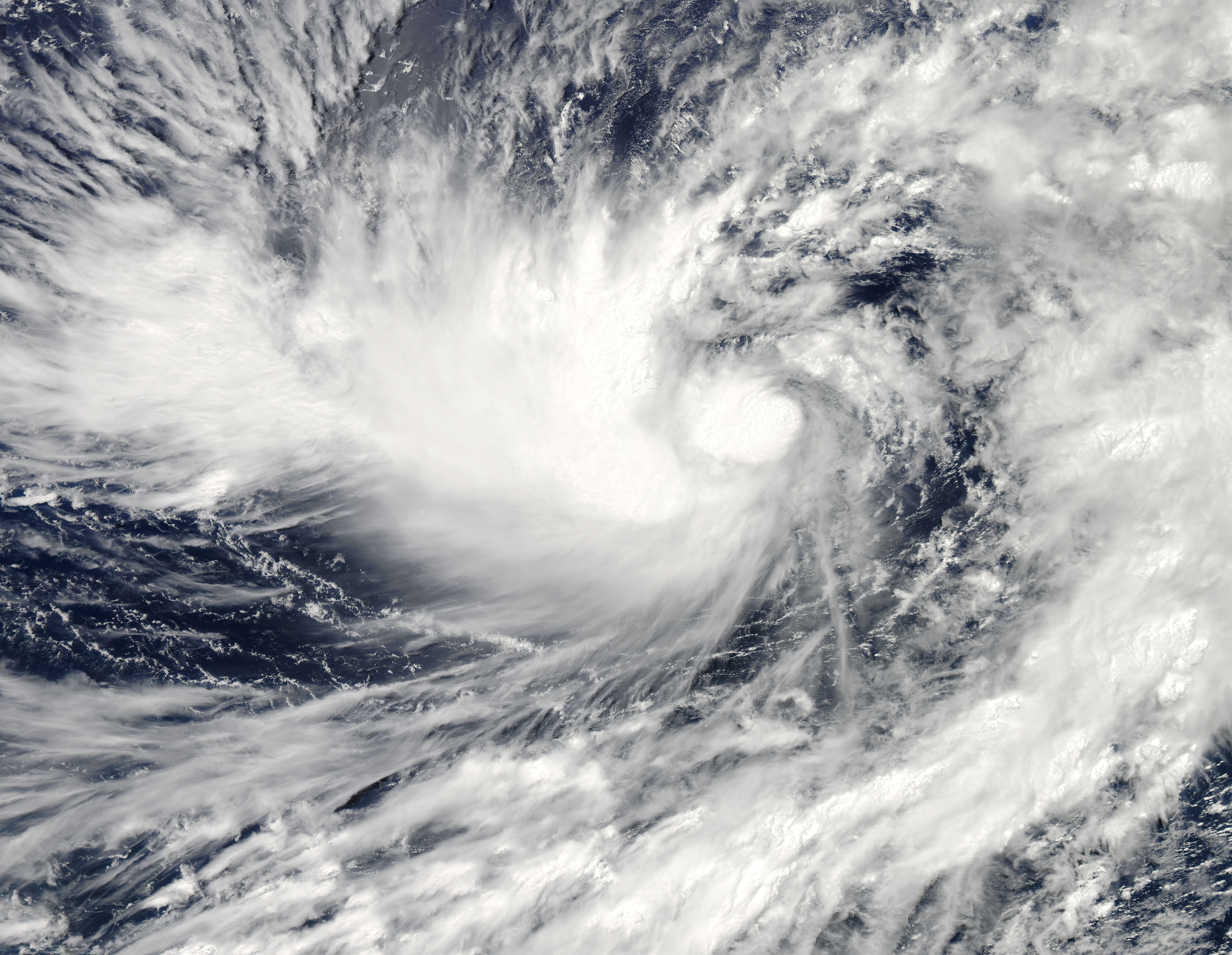
Tropical Storm Dolphin situated between Pohnpei and Kosrae on May 10

After its formation, the depression moved slowly with the low-level flow, in what the JTWC described as an "atypical eastward direction". Wind shear in the region exposed the convection from the circulation early on May 7, although the thunderstorms increased the next day, mostly in the storm's northwest quadrant. A building subtropical ridge turned the system more to the north. By May 8, the depression organized enough for the JTWC to upgrade it to a tropical storm. At 12:00 UTC on the next day, the JMA followed suit and upgraded the depression to a tropical storm named Dolphin. (Note: The name Dolphin was contributed by Hong Kong and refers to the Chinese white dolphin (Sousa chinensis), a mascot in Hong Kong.) By that time, the system had developed rainbands spiraling around the circulation, although continued wind shear left the center exposed. Around that time, Dolphin passed about 80 km (50 mi) west of Kosrae in the Federated States of Micronesia (FSM), and over the next few days it passed near other small islands in the region. Despite the sheared structure, the storm developed an eye feature on May 11, indicative of further strengthening, while the storm was passing 285 km (177 mi) east of Pohnpei. That day, the shear began to decrease, allowing the outflow to improve and convection to blossom. Early on May 12, the JMA upgraded Dolphin to a severe tropical storm, estimating 10 minute winds of 95 km/h (59 mph).

On May 12, Dolphin began moving steadily to the west-northwest. It developed a persistent central dense overcast over the center as conditions became increasingly favorable. At 00:00 UTC, the JMA and JTWC both upgraded Dolphin to typhoon status, based on a developing eye feature. The eye, initially only 9 km (5.6 mi) in diameter, became more defined in the center of the convection. The intensification trend was soon halted by a combination of moderate southerly wind shear and dry air from the west, causing the eye to become obscured on conventional satellite imagery. On May 15, the wind shear once again lessened. The compact core persisted during this time, although the center was slightly obscured. As the typhoon approached Guam, radar imagery tracked the eye underneath the deepest convection. Late on May 15, Dolphin passed between Guam and Rota, bringing its eyewall over both islands.

After leaving the Mariana Islands, the eye of Dolphin became much larger as the storm developed strong outflow channels, both indicative of further strengthening. On May 16, the typhoon began rapid deepening as it reached the western periphery of the ridge, causing it to turn more to the north. At 06:00 UTC that day, the JMA estimated peak 10 minute winds of 185 km/h (115 mph). Based on the well-defined structure and Dvorak ratings of T7.0, the JTWC upgraded Dolphin to a super typhoon late on May 16 with 1 minute winds of 260 km/h (160 mph). The approaching westerlies turned Dolphin to the north and northeast on May 17 while also imparting unfavorable conditions, causing the eye and the convection to elongate and weaken. By May 18, increased wind shear had exposed the circulation as the winds continued to drop. After the convection decreased further, the JTWC discontinued advisories on Dolphin on May 19, once Dolphin was beginning to become extratropical near the Japanese island of Iwo Jima. On the next day, the winds fell below typhoon force, and at 00:00 UTC on May 21, the JMA declared Dolphin extratropical. The storm accelerated to the northeast, passing through the Aleutian Islands on May 22. The storm slowed once reaching the Gulf of Alaska, turning eastward to cross the International Date Line on May 24.

== Preparations, impact, and aftermath ==
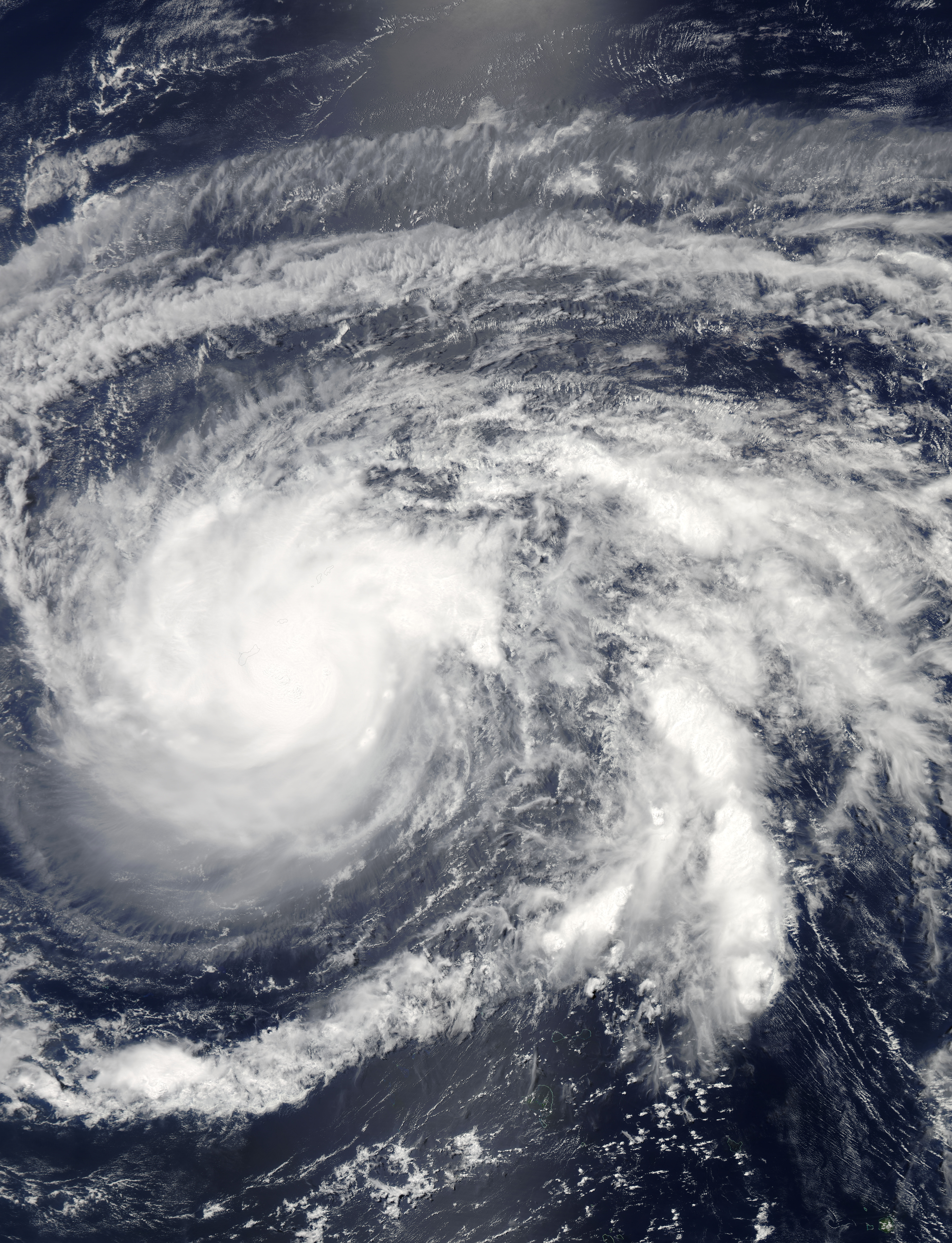
Typhoon Dolphin near Guam on May 15

Early in Dolphin's duration, it moved through the eastern FSM. On Kosrae, winds peaked at 60 km/h (37 mph). Later, the outer rainbands affected Pohnpei, producing a gust of 88 km/h (55 mph), as well as heavy rainfall. Over three days, the precipitation reached 603 mm (23.73 in) of rainfall over three days, including 388 mm (15.26 in) in one day. This accounted for about one-third of Pohnpei's record monthly rainfall total of 1,109 mm (43.68 in) for May 2015. The high winds downed hundreds of trees, some of which fell onto cars and homes, and killed one person. One family in Palikir needed medical attention when a tree fell onto their house. Residents lost power and water access for up to two weeks. Many houses had damage to roofs, and about 200 homes on Pohnpei were damaged or destroyed. Crops also sustained damage from high waves causing salt intrusion, affecting taro patches. Damage in the FSM was estimated at $1 million. In response to the damage, the FSM government declared Pohnpei as a state of emergency on June 8. The typhoon's westerly winds produced a swell that affected the Marshall Islands, sinking several boats in Kwajalein Atoll.

In preparation for the cyclone, schools, businesses, and public transit were closed on Guam. The Federal Emergency Management Agency (FEMA) deployed approximately 15 representatives to the island to mitigate the response time in the wake of the storm. Eight schools were opened as shelters, and more than 1,000 residents sought refuge during the height of the storm. Additional shelters were opened on the islands of Rota, Tinian, and Saipan in the Northern Mariana Islands (CNMI), and nearly 200 people sought cover there. Airports and seaports between the three islands were shut down, causing flights to be canceled. Earlier in 2015, the Guam Weather Forecast Office created a Facebook page to help inform residents about typhoons; during Dolphin, the page received over 425,000 views.

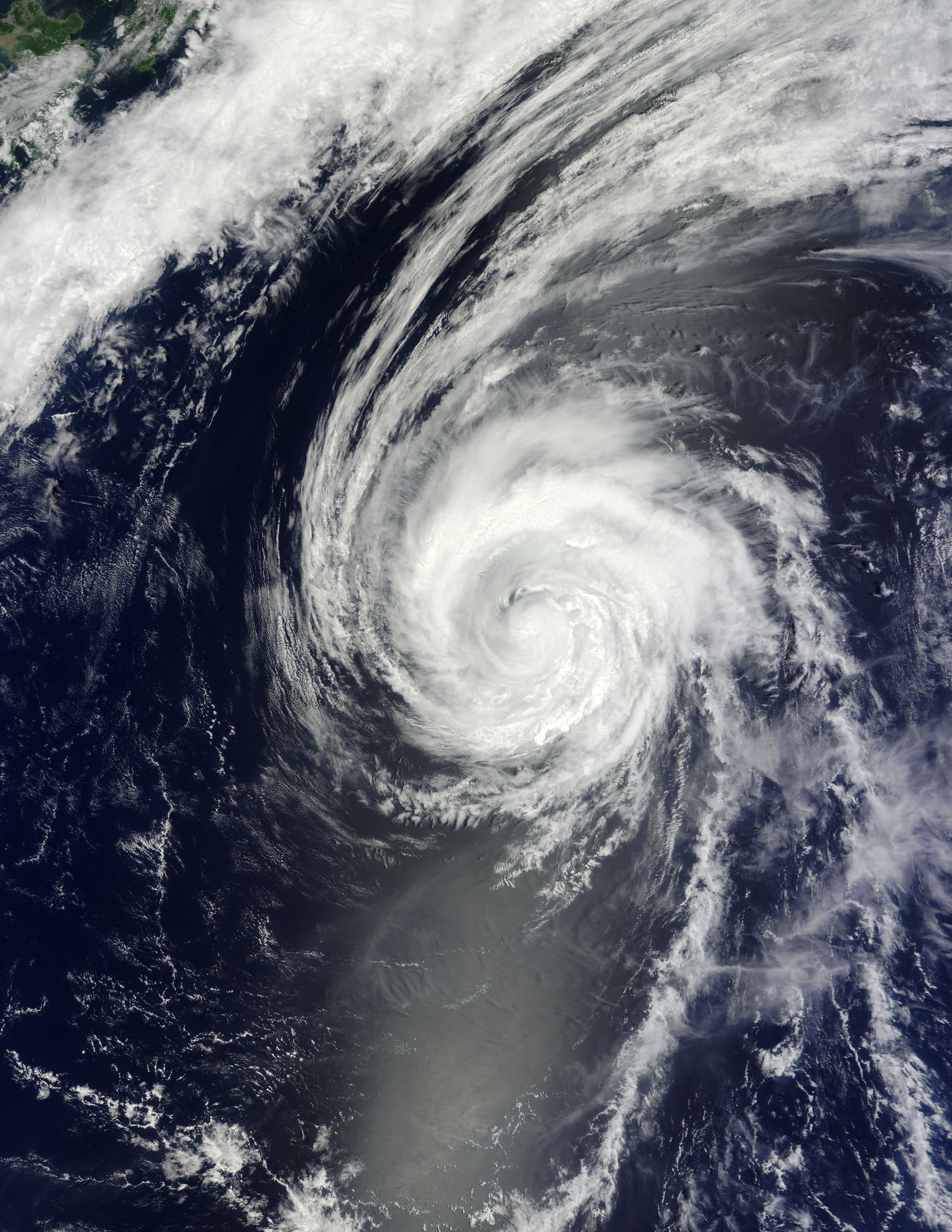
Typhoon Dolphin becoming extratropical near Iwo Jima on May 19

Passing just north of Guam, Dolphin produced the first typhoon-force winds on the island since 2002 during Typhoon Pongsona. Andersen Air Force Base recorded sustained winds of 135 km/h (84 mph), while gusts reached 171 km/h (106 mph). In the central portion of the island, the NWS office recorded gusts of 130 km/h (81 mph). The storm dropped torrential rainfall during its passage, reaching over 460 mm (18 in) at Andersen Air Force Base, of which 240 mm (9.3 in) fell within a 12-hour period. Wave heights offshore Guam topped 6.1 m (20 ft). On Guam, the heavy rainfall caused flooding in areas lacking proper drainage. The Guam Memorial Hospital sustained about $1 million in damage from storm-related flooding. High winds left about 40% of Guam without power, mostly in the north and central portions of the island, although the outages were fixed within a few days. The power outages also disrupted generators for water wells, leaving 3,300 people without access to clean water; residents in some areas were under a boil-water advisory. Utility damage was estimated at $3 million. Businesses sustained $1.9 million in damage. Dolphin also caused $1.2 million worth of crop damage. The typhoon damaged over 7,000 banana trees as well as 39 of the endangered ironwood trees. Rough waves sank a boat at Apra Harbor, requiring workers to clean oil that escaped from the damaged vessel. Dolphin damaged 390 houses across Guam, of which 9 were destroyed and another 55 were severely damaged. This left 1,055 people homeless, mostly in the towns of Yigo or Dededo. Overall damage was estimated at nearly $10 million, prompting Governor Eddie Calvo to declare a state of emergency. On June 5, President Barack Obama signed a major disaster declaration for the territory, allowing for federal aid to be used. Ultimately, the government provided about $4.7 million in aid, mostly in public assistance. A federal grant provided 220 temporary jobs toward cleaning and repairing damage.

On Rota to the north of Guam, Dolphin produced the first typhoon-force winds since 2004 during Chaba. The storm damaged many homes on the island. High winds knocked down trees and power lines, causing an island-wide power outage. Damage on Rota was estimated at $2.5 million. Continued high waves from the typhoon caused difficult conditions for ships trying to bring supplies to the country, after store supplies began running out. Workers quickly repaired the power outages and cleared roads of any storm debris. The government of the CNMI declared Rota a disaster area, meaning emergency funds could be allocated toward relief and reconstruction. On Saipan to the north of Rota, wind gusts reached 101 km/h (63 mph), while rainfall totaled 89 mm (3.5 in).

The remnants of Dolphin, in conjunction with previous Typhoon Noul, shifted the broader weather pattern to bring record warmth to Alaska, making the temperatures warmer than that of Washington, D.C.

== See also ==
- Weather of 2015
- Tropical cyclones in 2015
- Other tropical cyclones named Dolphin
- List of near-Equatorial tropical cyclones
- List of typhoons in the Mariana Islands

- Typhoon Isa (1997) – an early season typhoon that affected Guam in 1997
- Typhoon Chataan (2002) – a deadly typhoon in 2002 that killed 47 people in the FSM and later struck Guam
- Typhoon Choi-wan (2009) – a strong typhoon that passed through the Northern Marianas Islands
