= Guam Power Authority =

The Guam Power Authority (GPA, Chamorro: Aturidat Ilektresedat Guahan) is an agency of the Government of Guam and Guam's electricity provider. Its headquarters are in Fadian, Mangilao, Guam.

== Consolidated Commission on Utilities ==
The Guam Consolidated Commission on Utilities is elected at-large in Guam general elections in phased terms for four years every two years with no term limits, overseeing the Guam Power Authority and the Guam Waterworks Authority. The election is formally nonpartisan, with the party affiliations below reflecting known political history, candidate self-declaration, or state party support. They are listed in alphabetical order.

Name	Party	Start	Next Election
Melvin Duenas	Independent	January 1, 2025	2028
Mike Limtiaco	Republican	January 1, 2019	2026
Pedro Martinez	Independent	March 22, 2021 (appointed)	2028
Simon Sanchez	Republican	January 1, 2003	2026
Francis Santos	Democratic	January 1, 2015	2026
