= Extreme wind warning =

Warning for areas expected to experience surface winds of at least 100 knots

Category 3 Hurricane Matthew's close passage of Brevard County, Florida on the morning of October 7, 2016 prompted the issuance of the first Extreme Wind Warning.

An extreme wind warning (SAME code EWW) is an alert issued by the National Weather Service for areas on land that will experience sustained surface winds 115 miles per hour (100 kn; 185 km/h; 51 m/s) or greater within one hour. As of 2025, it has only been used for the eyewalls of major (Note: Category 3 intensity or higher on the Saffir-Simpson scale) hurricanes when they pass near-shore, and during and shortly after landfall, but it is also intended as a general "short-fused" warning for any immediate occurrence of such winds. Extreme wind warnings are issued for as precise of an area as possible, in like manner as a tornado warning, to provide guidance to the general public at the county and sub-county level when such winds pose a significant threat of casualties. They cannot be issued earlier than two hours before the onset of extreme winds.

== History ==
The extreme wind warning was created out of a need for an unambiguous bulletin of equivalent priority as a tornado warning for the extreme winds of a major hurricane's eyewall, particularly after Hurricane Charley and Hurricane Jeanne struck Florida in 2004. Prior to the advent of the warning, similar bulletins were often embedded in, and issued as tornado warnings to give them higher visibility and urgency. During the passage of Charley across the state, the National Weather Service weather forecast office in Melbourne, Florida, issued such an ad hoc "tornado" warning after the office's forecasters determined that the active hurricane warnings did not sufficiently convey the severity and imminence of Charley's eyewall over central Florida. The forecast office also issued similar "tornado" warnings as the strong winds of Jeanne moved ashore from the east later that year. The nonconventional usage of tornado warnings for extreme hurricane winds was praised by emergency management, citing it as an ingenious method of protecting lives. In December 2004, the Melbourne forecast office briefed attendees at an annual NOAA Hurricane Conference on their use of the special tornado warning, advocating and eventually reaching consensus for a specialized official National Weather Service product for extreme winds.

The new warning was standardized in its experimental stages in 2005, so weather forecast offices continued to use special tornado warnings to broadcast the threat of severe wind during the landfalls of Hurricanes Dennis, Katrina, Rita, and Wilma. The wind and timing thresholds that eventually became the criteria of extreme wind warnings were also used as thresholds for these special tornado warnings in 2005. The warnings, termed Extreme Tropical Cyclone Destructive Wind Warnings, advised residents to take sturdy shelter in the interior portions of well-built structures. During Katrina, the weather services serving the Jackson and New Orleans and Baton Rouge, Louisiana forecast areas issued 19 warnings. Public response to these warnings was mixed, praising their specificity but finding their placement within tornado warnings confusing, particularly when they were issued near traditional tornado warnings. The advice of taking interior low-level shelter given in the wind warnings also contradicted the advice given in Hurricane Local Statements of taking interior shelter in elevated floors for storm surge-prone areas. NOAA/NWS recommendations called for the development of an extreme wind warning independent from tornado warnings and increased outreach for the warning.

The following year, extreme wind warnings continued to be packaged within special tornado warnings for public evaluation, and the warning became its own official independent product by the 2007 Atlantic hurricane season, though no hurricane would trigger an extreme wind warning for nearly another decade. Despite the newly independent warning system, until the 2015 Atlantic hurricane season, the Emergency Alert System continued to broadcast EWWs as tornado warnings (using the TOR event code). On the morning of October 7, 2016, the nearby passage of Category 3 Hurricane Matthew just off Cape Canaveral prompted the first issuance of an extreme wind warning. In 2023, the National Weather Service in Guam was granted the ability to issue EWWs, and on May 24, 2023, the first extreme wind warning was issued in the Western Pacific, as a result of Typhoon Mawar.

== Issuances ==
Extreme wind warnings issued by the National Weather Service
Date	Event	State / Territory	Location	Weather Forecast Office
October 7, 2016	Hurricane Matthew	Florida	Brevard	MLB (Melbourne, FL)
August 25, 2017	Hurricane Harvey	Texas	Aransas, Calhoun, Nueces, San Patricio, Refugio	CRP (Corpus Christi, TX)
September 6, 2017	Hurricane Irma	U.S. Virgin Islands	Saint John, Saint Thomas	SJU (San Juan, PR)
September 10, 2017	Hurricane Irma	Florida	Monroe (two separate warnings)	KEY (Key West, FL)
September 10, 2017	Hurricane Irma	Florida	Collier (two separate warnings)	MFL (Miami, FL)
September 10, 2017	Hurricane Irma	Florida	Lee	TBW (Tampa Bay Area–Ruskin, FL)
September 20, 2017	Hurricane Maria	Puerto Rico	Aguas Buenas, Bayamón, Canóvanas, Carolina, Cidra, Guaynabo, Río Grande, San Juan, Trujillo Alto	SJU (San Juan, PR)
October 10, 2018	Hurricane Michael	Alabama, Florida, Georgia	Florida: Bay, Franklin, Gulf	TAE (Tallahassee, FL)
October 10, 2018	Hurricane Michael	Alabama, Florida, Georgia	Florida: Jackson, Gulf, Bay, Calhoun, Liberty, Washington	TAE (Tallahassee, FL)
October 10, 2018	Hurricane Michael	Alabama, Florida, Georgia	Florida: Jackson, Gadsden, Holmes, Washington; Georgia: Decatur, Seminole	TAE (Tallahassee, FL)
October 10, 2018	Hurricane Michael	Alabama, Florida, Georgia	Alabama: Houston; Florida: Jackson; Georgia: Decatur, Miller, Early, Seminole	TAE (Tallahassee, FL)
August 26, 2020	Hurricane Laura	Louisiana, Texas	Louisiana: Cameron, Jefferson Davis, Beauregard, Acadia, Calcasieu, Vermilion, Allen; Texas: Jefferson, Newton, Hardin, Orange, Jasper	LCH (Lake Charles, LA) issued by BRO (Brownsville, TX)†
August 27, 2020	Hurricane Laura	Louisiana, Texas	Louisiana: Cameron, Jefferson Davis, Beauregard, Calcasieu, Allen; Texas: Newton, Orange	LCH (Lake Charles, LA) issued by BRO (Brownsville, TX)†
August 27, 2020	Hurricane Laura	Louisiana, Texas	Louisiana: Cameron, Jefferson Davis, Beauregard, Calcasieu, Vernon, Allen; Texas: Newton, Orange, Jasper	LCH (Lake Charles, LA) issued by BRO (Brownsville, TX)†
August 29, 2021	Hurricane Ida	Louisiana	Jefferson, Lafourche, Plaquemines, St. Bernard, St. Charles, Terrebonne, St. John the Baptist	LIX (New Orleans, LA)
September 28, 2022	Hurricane Ian	Florida	Lee, Charlotte, Sarasota, DeSoto, Manatee, Hardee, Highlands, Polk	TBW (Tampa Bay Area–Ruskin, FL)
May 24, 2023	Typhoon Mawar	Guam	Dededo, Yigo, Tamuning	GUM (Tiyan, GU)
August 30, 2023	Hurricane Idalia	Florida	Dixie, Lafayette, Madison, Taylor	TAE (Tallahassee, FL)
August 30, 2023	Hurricane Idalia	Florida	Suwannee	JAX (Jacksonville, FL)
September 26, 2024	Hurricane Helene	Florida, Georgia	Florida: Dixie, Jefferson, Lafayette, Leon, Madison, Taylor, Wakulla Georgia: Brooks, Lowndes, Thomas	TAE (Tallahassee, FL)
September 27, 2024	Hurricane Helene	Georgia, Florida	Georgia: Echols Florida: Suwannee, Hamilton	JAX (Jacksonville, FL) issued by LIX (New Orleans, LA)†
October 9, 2024	Hurricane Milton	Florida	Hillsborough, Manatee, Pinellas	TBW (Tampa Bay Area–Ruskin, FL)
April 14, 2026	Typhoon Sinlaku	Northern Mariana Islands	Saipan, Tinian	GUM (Tiyan, GU) issued by HFO (Honolulu, HI)†
July 6, 2026	Typhoon Bavi	Northern Mariana Islands	Rota	GUM (Tiyan, GU)
October 9, 2026	Hurricane Isaias	Florida	Okaloosa, Santa Rosa, Escambia	MOB (Mobile, AL)
October 9, 2026	Hurricane Isaias	Florida	Walton	TAE (Tallahassee, FL)
October 17, 2026	Typhoon Champi	Guam	Southern Guam	GUM (Tiyan, GU)
† – Issued by an alternative WFO under continuance of operations; for example, a WFO under shelter or closed due to impending hurricane impacts.

== Example ==
The following is an example of an Extreme Wind Warning from the National Weather Service office in Ruskin, Florida (TBW) during the landfall of Hurricane Milton:

404
WFUS52 KTBW 092236
EWWTBW
FLC057-081-103-100130-
/O.NEW.KTBW.EW.W.0001.241009T2236Z-241010T0130Z/

BULLETIN - EAS ACTIVATION REQUESTED
Extreme Wind Warning
National Weather Service Tampa Bay Area Ruskin FL
636 PM EDT Wed Oct 9 2024

The National Weather Service in Ruskin has issued a

* Extreme Wind Warning for...
  Manatee County in west central Florida...
  Pinellas County in west central Florida...
  Hillsborough County in west central Florida...

* Until 930 PM EDT.

* At 635 PM EDT, National Weather Service Doppler radar indicated
  extreme winds, associated with the eyewall of Hurricane Milton,
  were moving onshore along a line extending from 6 miles southwest
  of South Bradenton to 25 miles southwest of Anna Maria to 52 miles
  southwest of Saint Armands Key, moving northeast at 30 mph. THIS
  IS AN EXTREMELY DANGEROUS AND LIFE-THREATENING SITUATION!

PRECAUTIONARY/PREPAREDNESS ACTIONS...

TAKE COVER NOW! Treat these imminent extreme winds as if a tornado
was approaching and move immediately to the safe room in your
shelter. Take action now to protect your life!

&&

A Tornado Watch remains in effect until 900 PM EDT for west central
Florida.

LAT...LON 2812 8289 2815 8206 2739 8209 2739 8260
      2735 8268 2786 8291
TIME...MOT...LOC 2235Z 242DEG 27KT 2740 8267 2735 8309 2699 8334

$$

TBW

== See also ==
- Severe weather terminology (United States)
