= Typhoon Pongsona =

Pacific typhoon in 2002

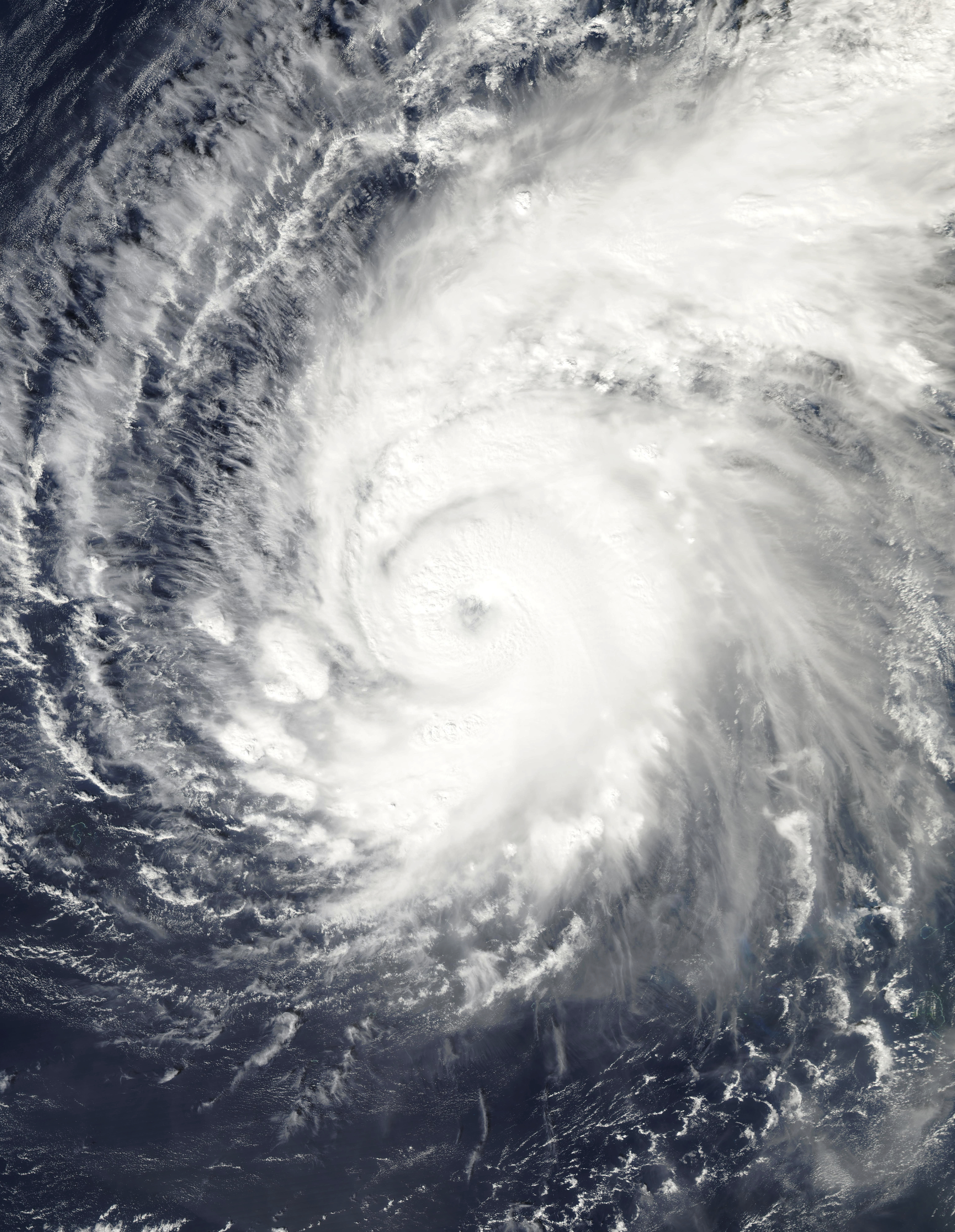
- Typhoon Pongsona near peak intensity on December 8

Meteorological history
- Formed: December 2, 2002
- Extratropical: December 11, 2002
- Dissipated: December 12, 2002

Very strong typhoon
- 10-minute sustained (JMA)
- Highest winds: 165 km/h (105 mph)
- Lowest pressure: 940 hPa (mbar); 27.76 inHg

Category 4-equivalent super typhoon
- 1-minute sustained (SSHWS/JTWC)
- Highest winds: 240 km/h (150 mph)
- Lowest pressure: 910 hPa (mbar); 26.87 inHg

Overall effects
- Fatalities: 1 indirect
- Damage: $730 million (2002 USD)
- Areas affected: Guam, Northern Mariana Islands
- IBTrACS
- Part of the 2002 Pacific typhoon season

Typhoon Pongsona (Note: The name Pongsona (Korean: 봉선화, [po̞ŋsʰɔ̹nβwa̠]) was contributed by North Korea and means garden balsam (Impatiens balsamina) in Korean.) was the last typhoon of the 2002 Pacific typhoon season, and was the second costliest United States disaster in 2002, only behind Hurricane Lili. Pongsona developed out of an area of disturbed weather on December 2, and steadily intensified to reach typhoon status on December 5. On December 8 it passed through Guam and the Northern Mariana Islands while at peak intensity, with 10-minute sustained winds of 175 km/h (110 mph). It ultimately turned to the northeast, weakened, and became extratropical on December 11.

Typhoon Pongsona produced strong wind gusts peaking at 285 km/h (175 mph), which left the entire island of Guam without power and destroyed about 1,300 houses. With strong building standards and experience from repeated typhoon strikes, there were no fatalities directly related to Pongsona, although there was one indirect death from flying glass. Damage on the island totaled over US$730 million, (Note: All currency totals are in United States dollars and are unadjusted for inflation.) making Pongsona among the five costliest typhoons on the island. The typhoon also caused extreme damage on Rota and elsewhere in the Northern Mariana Islands, and as a result of its impact the name was retired.

== Meteorological history ==
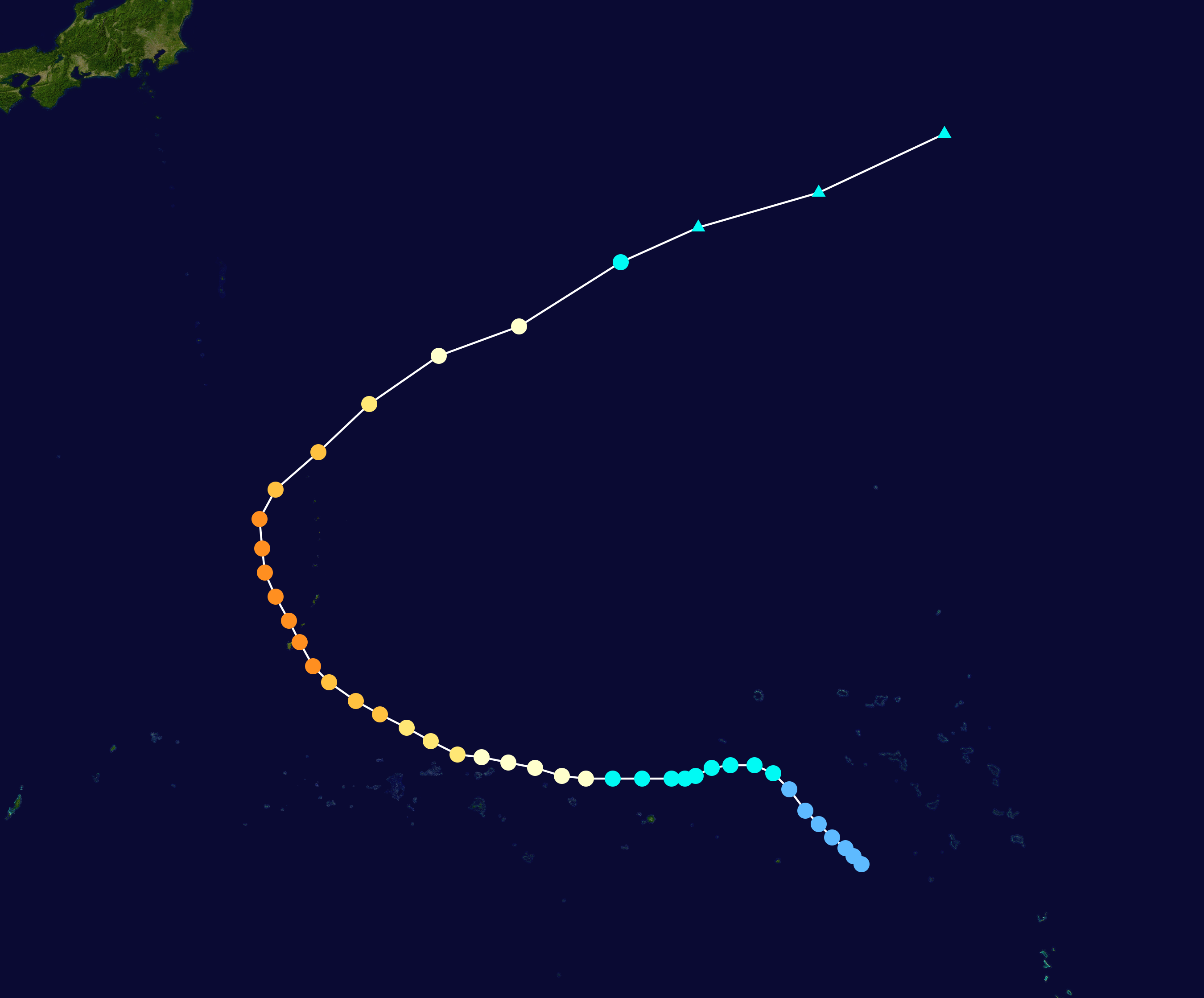
Map plotting the storm's track and intensity, according to the Saffir–Simpson scale Map key Saffir–Simpson scale Tropical depression (≤38 mph, ≤62 km/h) Tropical storm (39–73 mph, 63–118 km/h) Category 1 (74–95 mph, 119–153 km/h) Category 2 (96–110 mph, 154–177 km/h) Category 3 (111–129 mph, 178–208 km/h) Category 4 (130–156 mph, 209–251 km/h) Category 5 (≥157 mph, ≥252 km/h) Unknown Storm type Tropical cyclone Subtropical cyclone Extratropical cyclone, remnant low, tropical disturbance, or monsoon depression

During late November, an area of convection persisted about 625 kilometers (388 miles) east-southeast of Pohnpei. Satellite imagery indicated broad cyclonic turning in the lower levels of the atmosphere, and a trough was located near the surface. The disturbance developed rainbands and gradually became better organized. By December 2, the system had an elongated low-level circulation, located to the south of the convection. At 0600 UTC that day, the Japan Meteorological Agency (JMA) classified the system as a tropical depression about 735 km (457 mi) east-northeast of Pohnpei. Shortly thereafter, the Joint Typhoon Warning Center (JTWC) issued a Tropical Cyclone Formation Alert, and at 1800 UTC on December 2 the agency classified the system as Tropical Depression 31W. Initially the depression moved to the west-northwest, and early on December 3 the JTWC classified the system as a tropical storm.

Initially, the circulation was exposed from the convection, although it was able to intensify into a tropical storm, given the name Pongsona at 1200 UTC on December 3 while located 375 km (233 mi) northeast of Pohnpei. It turned to the west on December 4, due to a ridge to the north. It slowly intensified, developing an eye feature on December 5. That day, both the JTWC and the JMA upgraded Pongsona to a typhoon about 1,150 km (710 mi) southeast of Guam.

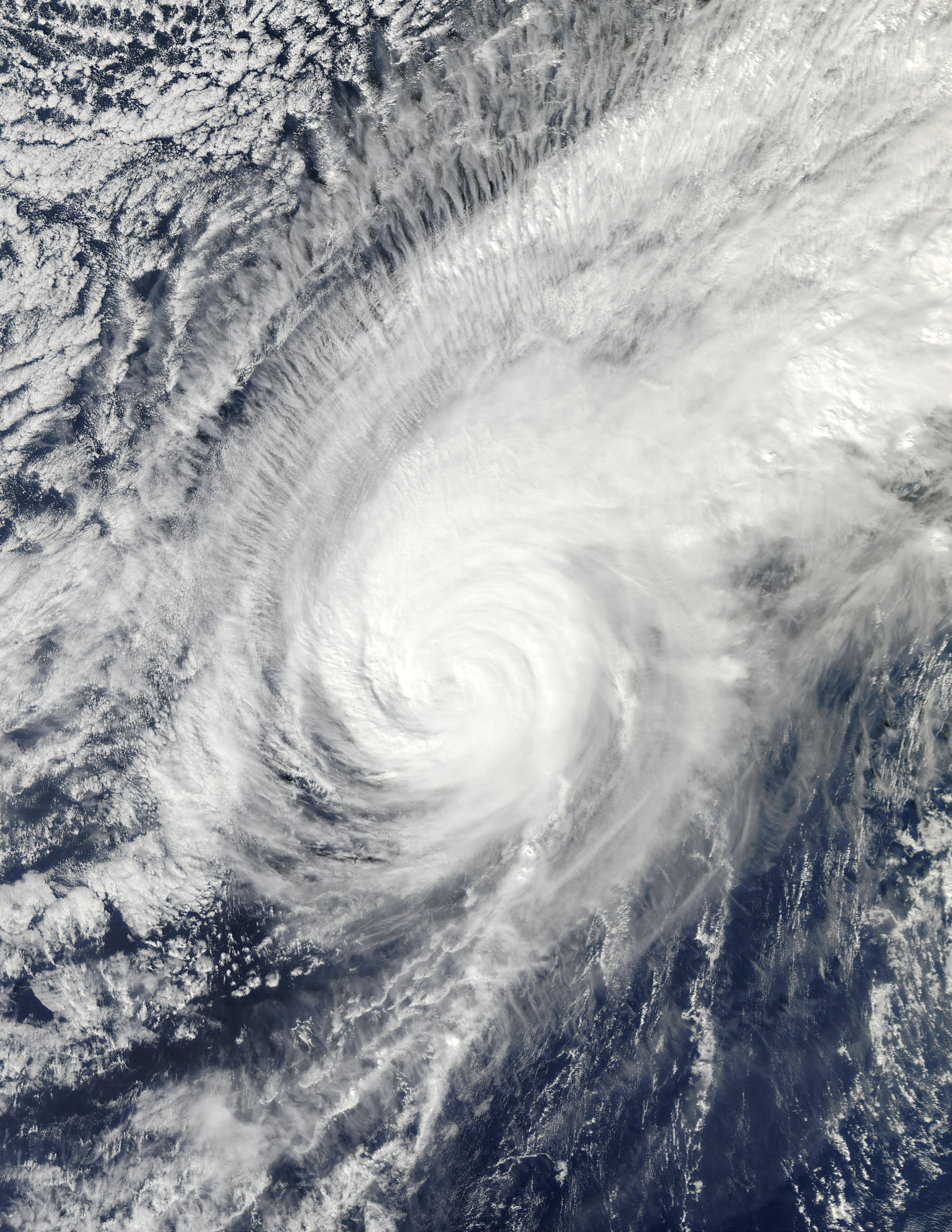
Typhoon Pongsona weakening on December 10

While continuing generally to the west, the eye of Pongsona gradually became better organized. A baroclinic cyclone east of Japan weakened the ridge, which caused the typhoon to turn more to the northwest. By late on December 7, Pongsona developed a well-defined 55 km (34 mi) wide eye as it approached Guam. After the typhoon underwent rapid deepening, the JTWC estimated that Pongsona reached peak winds of 273 km/h (170 mph) 1-min sustained), making it a Super Typhoon. At 0500 UTC on December 8, the eyewall made landfall on Guam, and two hours later the northern portion of the eyewall crossed over nearby Rota. Around that time, the JMA estimated Pongsona attained a peak intensity of 175 km/h (109 mph) 10-min winds) just to the north of Guam. The typhoon turned to the north-northwest through a weakness in the subtropical ridge a short distance west of the Northern Mariana Islands. On December 9, convection began to weaken as Pongsona began interacting with a mid-latitude system to its north. Dry air became entrained in the southwestern portion of the circulation, and the circulation became exposed from the diminishing convection. As a result, both the JTWC and the JMA declared Pongsona as an extratropical cyclone on December 11 about 1,400 km (870 mi) northwest of Wake Island.

== Preparations ==
The National Weather Service in Guam issued a tropical storm watch for the Marshall Islands shortly after Pongsona developed into a tropical storm, and a day later watches were issued for Chuuk. On December 5, the service issued tropical storm warnings for parts of the Federated States of Micronesia. As Pongsona became a typhoon, the Guam National Weather Service office issued a typhoon watch for Guam, Rota, Saipan, and Tinian, which was upgraded to a typhoon warning about 23 hours prior to the onset of tropical storm-force winds; typhoon warnings were also issued for the unpopulated island of Aguigan. By one day before the typhoon moved through the Mariana Islands, JTWC predicted Pongsona to pass well east of the area. Despite a more westward track than anticipated, forecasts remained stagnant until the morning of December 8, when forecasters reluctantly predicted much greater threat to the Mariana Islands. As a result, many citizens felt they were unprepared and insufficiently warned for the typhoon.

Nine shelters throughout the Northern Mariana Islands were opened to accommodate families needing assistance. Several schools opened classrooms as evacuation centers. On Guam, ten schools were used as shelters, and on the day of impact 2,271 people were in shelters. On Rota, 159 people sought shelter, and in Saipan, 549 were in shelters by the day of impact. The Guam Memorial Hospital officials advised all pregnant women within 32 weeks of their delivery date to check in. The Guam Office of Civil Defense filed the paperwork for the Federal Emergency Management Agency to declare the island a disaster area. Governor Carl T.C. Gutierrez took similar measures to declare a state of emergency for the area. Following experience from previous typhoons, Guam newspaper Pacific Daily News underwent preparations to provide internet updates for the storm, including reinforcing the building, maintaining sufficient food supplies for the staff, and stationing two reporters elsewhere on the island; the paper was the only immediate source of information about the typhoon outside of Guam.

== Impact ==
=== Federated States of Micronesia ===
Early in its duration, Pongsona first affected Pohnpei as a tropical storm. There, it produced heavy rains and gusty winds, though little damage was reported. Later, it brought tropical storm force winds to Chuuk. High waves from the storm washed over and covered some atolls.

=== Guam ===
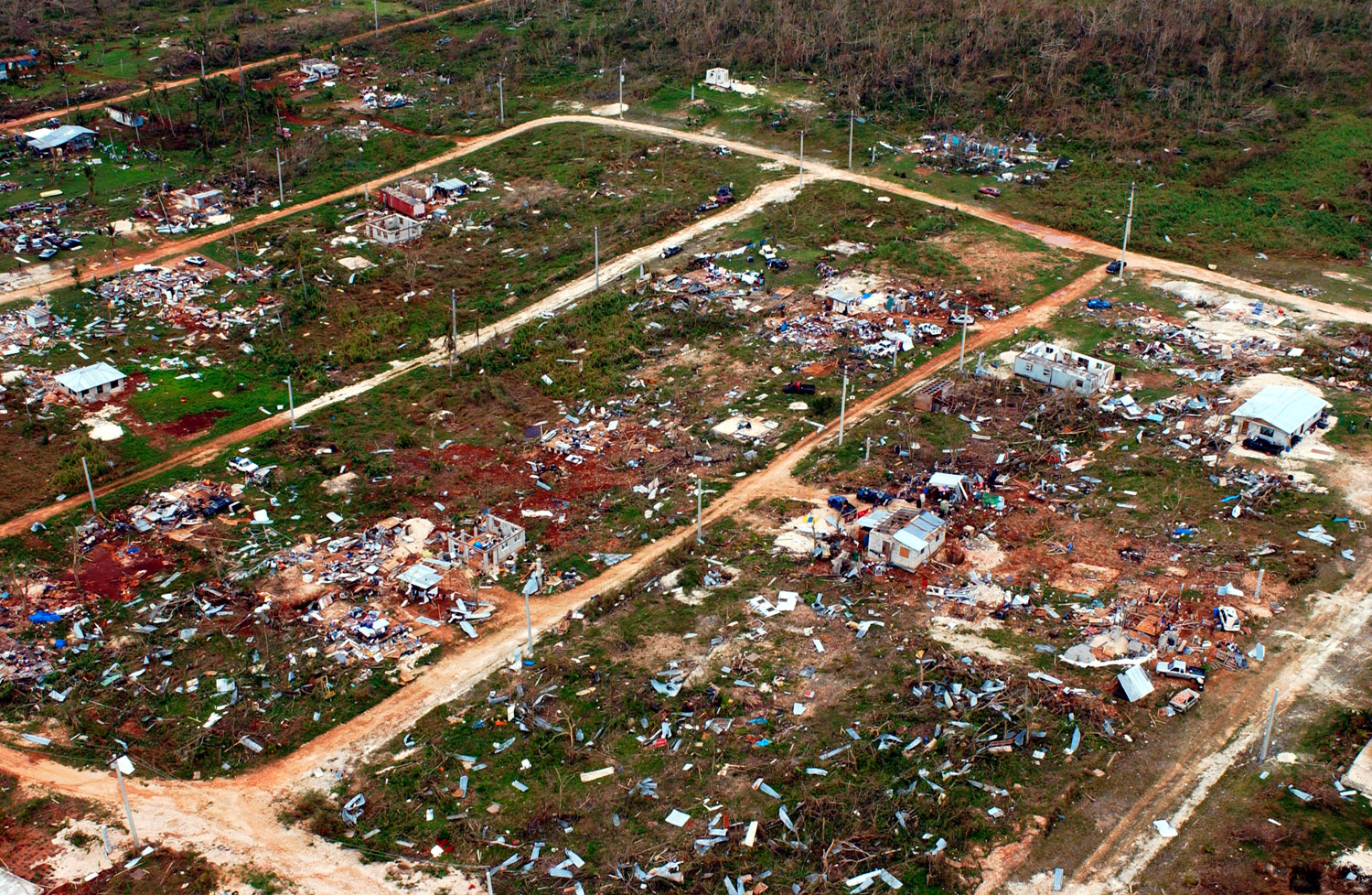
Damage from Pongsona on Guam

Typhoon Pongsona maintained a 65 km (40 mi) wide eye upon crossing the northern portion of the island of Guam; the Andersen Air Force Base was in the eye for two hours. Sustained winds from the typhoon peaked at 232 km/h (144 mph) with gusts peaking at 278 km/h (173 mph); gusts of at least 160 km/h (99 mph) affected the entire island. The lowest pressure on the island was 935 millibars (27.6 inHg), making Pongsona the third most intense typhoon to strike Guam; it is behind only a typhoon in 1900 (926 mbar, 27.3 inHg) and Typhoon Karen of 1962 (932 mbar, 27.5 inHg).

Communications on the island failed due to the winds; the entire island was left without power and phone service. The winds greatly damaged 715 power poles and 513 transformers, leaving about $52 million in electrical damage reported. The local weather office's communication link was cut off after flooding damaged a telecommunication facility, causing the National Weather Service in Honolulu, Hawaii, to provide backup support by temporarily issuing warnings and advisories. Many anemometers near the northern coastline failed from the winds. The winds collapsed several walls at the Guam Memorial Hospital, resulting in major damage throughout the northern two-thirds of the facility and several units being shut down. Several hotels, churches, and schools received moderate damage, and the Antonio B. Won Pat International Airport received damage to navigation equipment. Typhoon Pongsona also left 65% of the island's water wells inoperable, with most of Guam left without water service following the storm. Officials estimate the typhoon destroyed 1,300 homes, severely damaged 1,825, and lightly damaged 4,800.

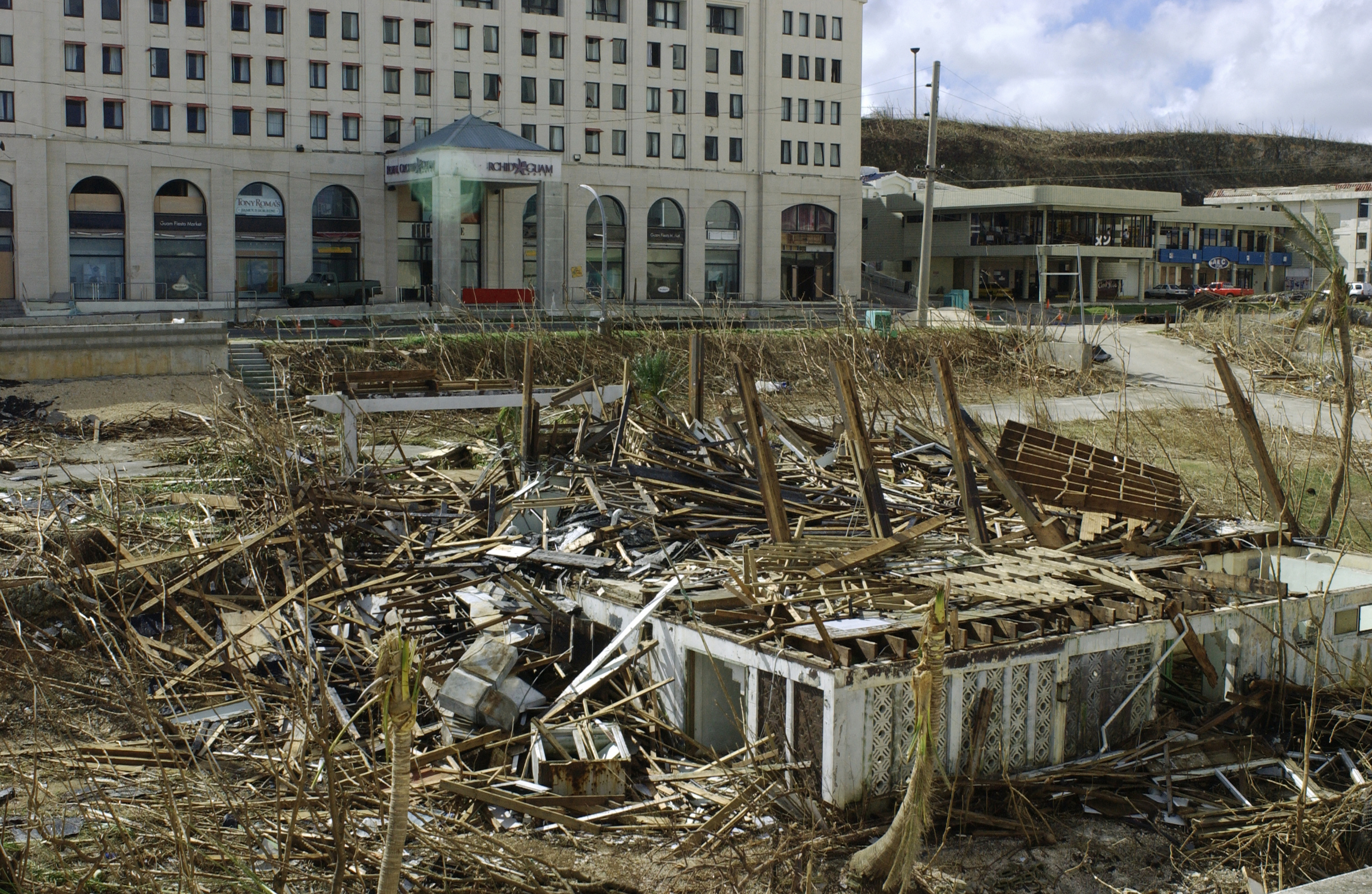
Damage in Guam from the typhoon

Tracking slowly across the center of the island, the intense inner rainbands dropped heavy rainfall which peaked at 650 mm (26 in) at the University of Guam. The precipitation led to record river flow on the Pago and Asan Rivers; overflown rivers caused damage to some roads and bridges. The rainfall also caused extensive flooding in several villages. Pongsona produced a storm surge of up to 6 m (20 ft) at some locations, with 3–4 m (9.8–13.1 ft) recorded near the eyewall. Considerable storm surge flooding occurred from Tumon southward to Piti, leaving some buildings on the west coast of the island flooded with 1 m (3.3 ft) of water. The combination of strong storm surge and rough waves caused considerable beach erosion and severe coastal damage.

Across Guam, damage totaled over $700 million, placing it among the five costliest typhoons on the island. The typhoon injured 193 people, as reported by the Guam Department of Health; most were lacerations and fractures caused by flying glass and other debris. There was one indirect death attributed to the storm, when a 71-year-old woman was cut by flying glass and subsequently suffered a fatal heart attack; medical help could not reach her due to the intensity of the storm. As six typhoons had passed directly over the island during the previous ten years, officials in Guam enacted strong building standards, keeping deaths and injuries to a minimum. The typhoon was considered by the public the worst typhoon to ever strike the island due to the large eye affecting most of the population.

=== Northern Mariana Islands ===
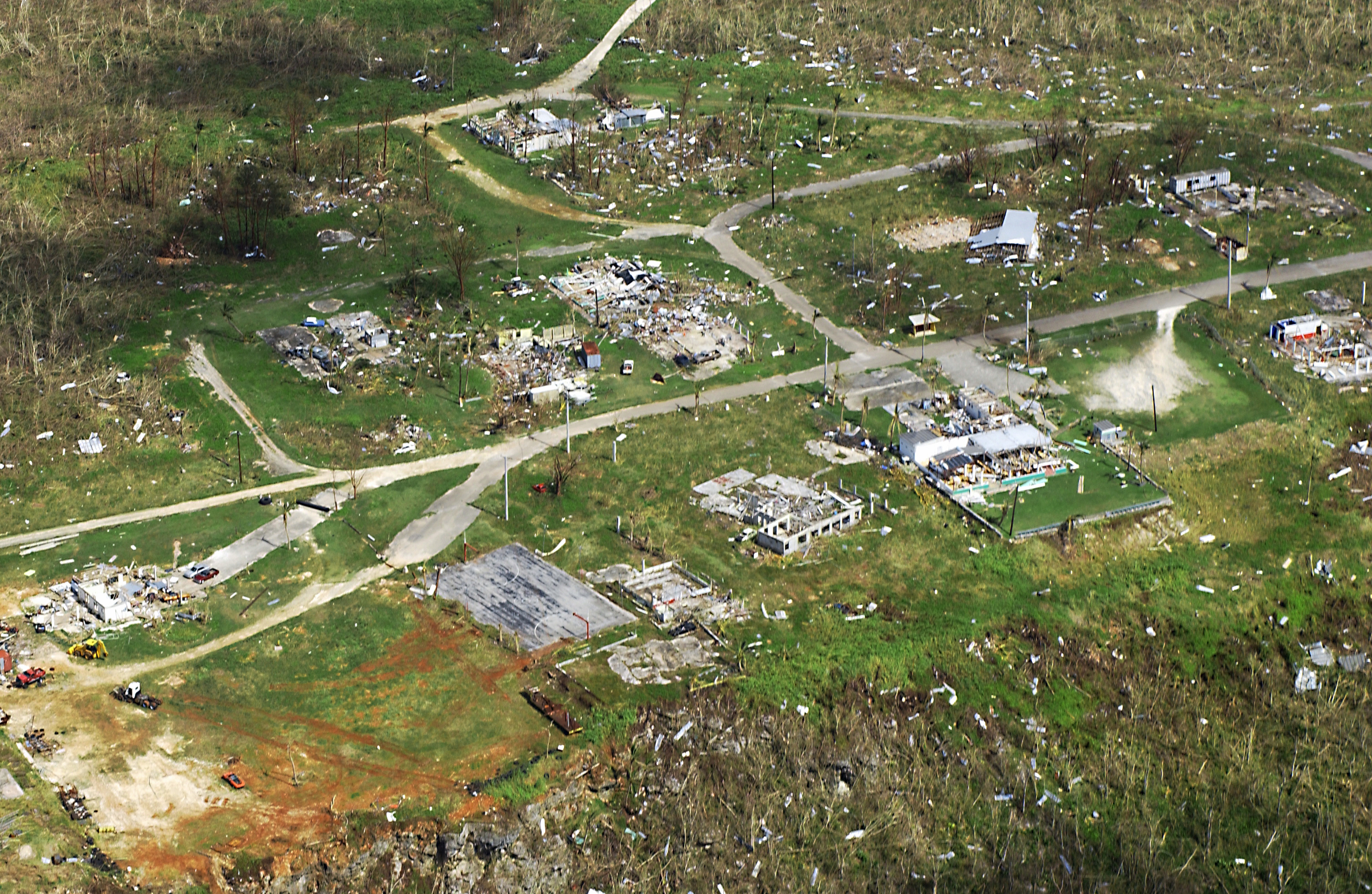
Typhoon damage on Rota

Pongsona produced sustained winds of 126 km/h (78 mph) with a gust to 137 km/h (85 mph) on Rota. The combination of winds and other effects from the typhoon destroyed 114 houses, severely damaged 154, and caused minor damage to 306; on the island, about 200 families were left homeless. The typhoon produced a storm surge of 6.7 m (22 ft) at the village of Songsong, which crossed about 80% of the southwestern peninsula on Rota. The surge caused moderate beach erosion on the island and destroyed a fuel pier and a loading pipeline. Additionally, the typhoon caused severe crop damage on the island. In all, the typhoon caused ten minor injuries on Rota and resulted in over $30 million in damage.

On Tinian, the passage of Pongsona destroyed two homes; seven received major damage, and another eight sustained minor damage. The winds damaged power lines, causing two island-wide power outages. Major crop damage was reported.

On Saipan, two houses were destroyed and fifteen were damaged, seven severely. Sustained winds on the island peaked at 71 km/h (44 mph), which caused scattered power outages. Six minor injuries were reported, and damage totaled about $100,000.

== Aftermath ==
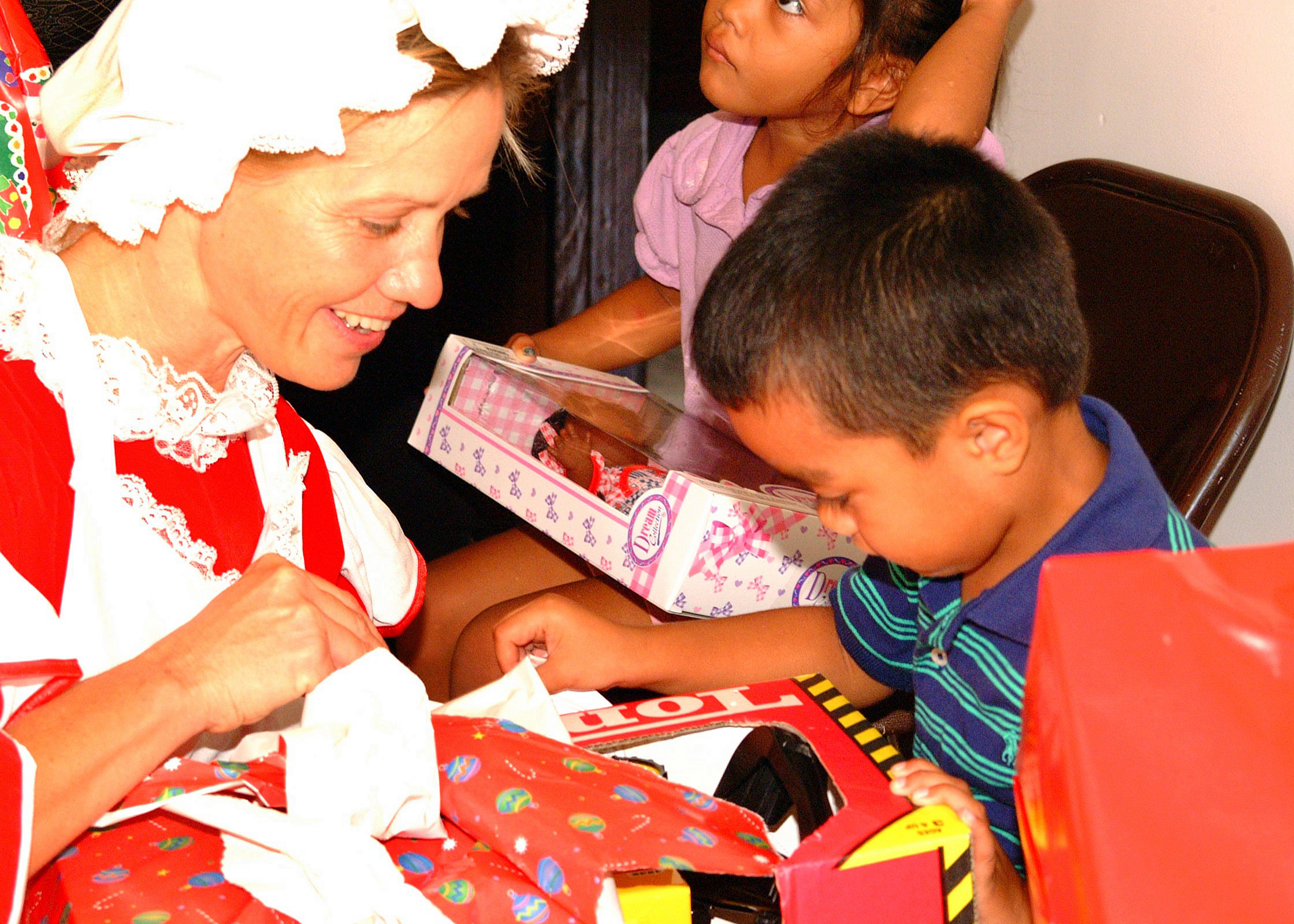
U.S. Navy Lt. Lisa Braun of U.S. Naval Hospital Guam, hands a toy to a Chalan Pago-Ordot child displaced following Super Typhoon Pongsona during a Christmas holiday event held for the children

On the same day that Typhoon Pongsona struck Guam, President George W. Bush declared the island a major disaster area. Around the time of the cyclone passing over the island, 2,271 residents were in shelters, and by the next day it increased to 3,467 after people discovered their homes were uninhabitable. With thirteen Red Cross shelters across Guam, most remained in shelters for about three weeks before disaster tents were distributed. The American Red Cross worked with the United States Department of Agriculture to provide meals for shelter attendees for a two-week period following the typhoon. Due to the lack of water supply, the American military flew bottled water to Guam. The USS Frank Cable desalinated the ocean to produce drinking water, leading to the ship being awarded a Humanitarian Service Medal. Through the collaboration of federal and other agencies, disaster assistance on Guam totaled over $300 million by 100 days after the typhoon struck, including $60 million in initial disaster response. Nearly 29,000 individuals registered for disaster assistance, with the first assistance check arrived ten days after the disaster declaration. By three months after the storm, the United States Small Business Administration approved $130 million in low-interest loans.

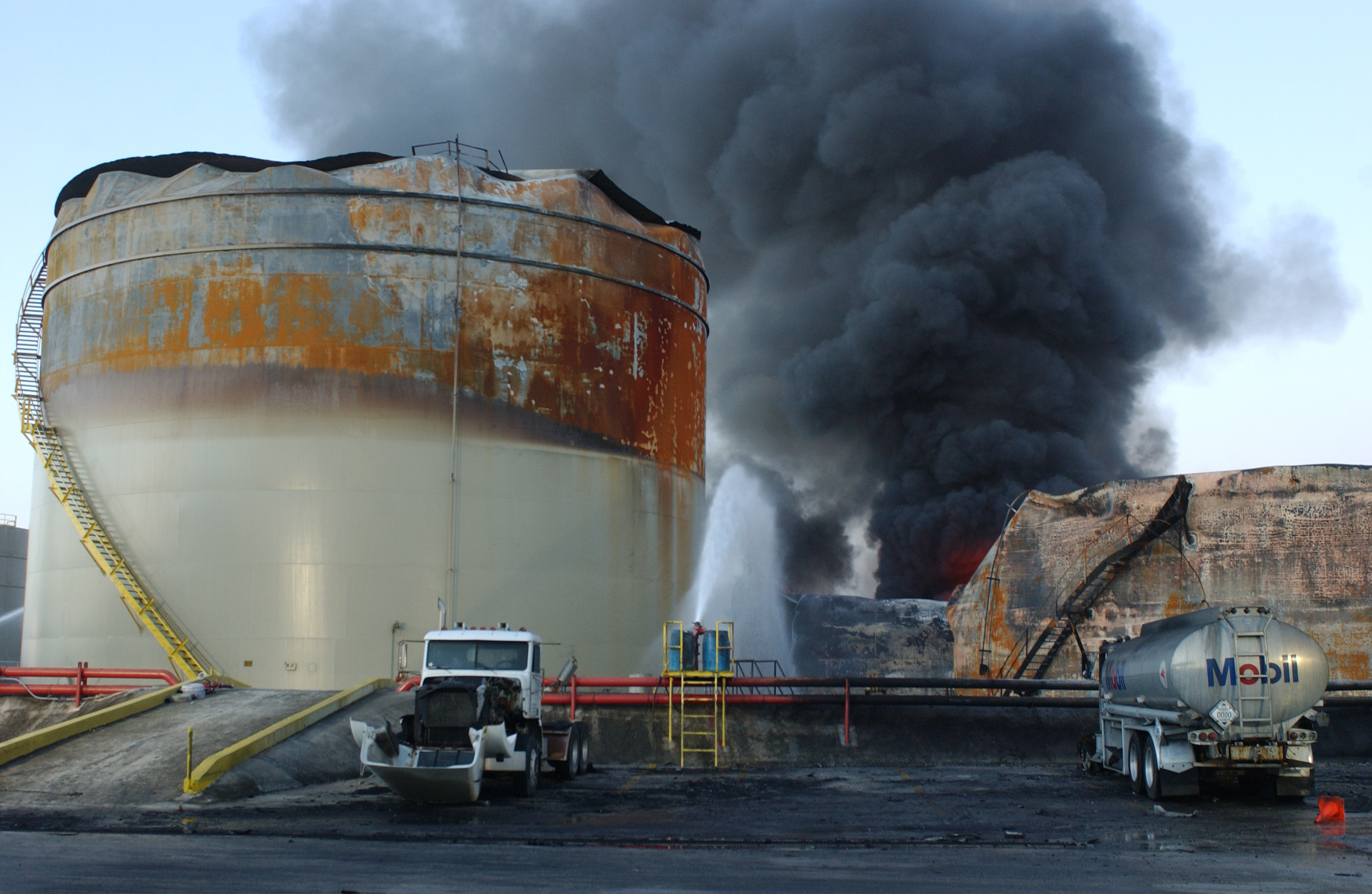
Gasoline tank fire on Cabras Island

During the height of the typhoon at Cabras Island on Guam, a gasoline tank caught fire, believed to be from friction caused by extremely high winds running through its ventilation system. The tank exploded, sending its lid airborne and spreading the fire to other nearby tanks. The proximity of the tanks as well as low water pressure hampered firefighting efforts, and the fire was extinguished five days later; it resulted in three destroyed gasoline tanks with two more caught on fire.

Guam's airport reopened four days after Pongsona struck. By a month after the typhoon, the Guam Power Authority had restored 10–20% of its affected customers, and it took three months to restore all of the outages. The agency used FEMA funding to replace wooden power lines with concrete, as well as burying transmission lines underground. The mitigation work cut down the restoration time to about six weeks when Typhoon Mawar struck the island in 2023.

The typhoon's passage contributed to Guam's economy contracting by 0.2% in 2003; this was largely due to decreased tourism and personal spending, although partially offset by rebuilding and increased government expenditure. In a statement to the United States House Committee on Natural Resources, incoming Governor Felix Perez Camacho described the situation as "the worst economic times in the history of our island."

A survey of Mariana fruit bats found a 70% decline on Rota and a 32% decline on Guam due to the typhoon's passage. Part of the loss was related to interisland migration and an increase in poaching.

On December 11, 2002, President Bush extended the disaster declaration to include the Northern Mariana Islands, which allocated emergency disaster aid for the territory. The declaration provided funding for 75% of the budget for debris removal and emergency protective measures. Immediately following the typhoon, FEMA assigned various federal agencies to respond to the island of Rota. Officials airlifted about 3,600 kg (7,900 lb) of emergency supplies including tents, tarps, water containers, coolers, cooking kits and electrical equipment. Military personnel were transported to assist in recovery efforts. By four months after the typhoon, 749 individuals on the island registered through FEMA's teleregistration number. The United States Small Business Administration approved 147 low– interest loans for $9.1 million to individuals and businesses and for economic injury on Rota. In all, disaster aid to Rota totaled $17.4 million. Additionally, President Bush authorized disaster assistance for the Federated States of Micronesia.

=== Retirement ===
Due to the damage resulted from the storm, the name Pongsona was retired during the 38th session of the Economic and Social Commission for Asia and the Pacific and World Meteorological Organization (ESCAP/WMO) Typhoon Committee in November 2005. It was replaced with the name Noul.

== See also ==
- List of typhoons on Guam
- Tropical cyclones in 2002
- Typhoon Paka (1997)
- Typhoon Dolphin (2015)
- Typhoon Mawar (2023)
