= Typhoon Mawar =

Pacific typhoon in 2023

Typhoon Mawar (Betty)
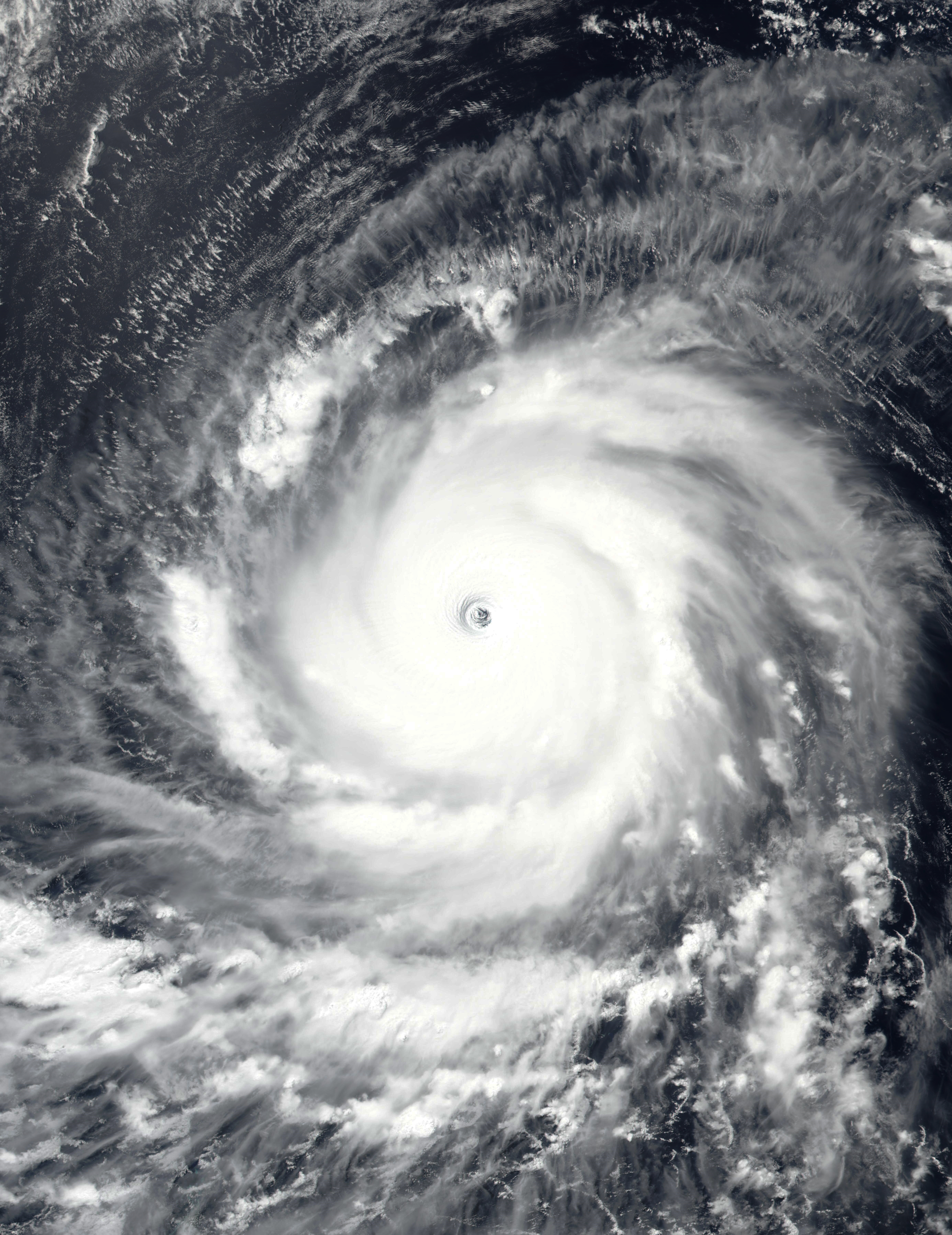
- Mawar at its peak intensity over the Philippine Sea on May 26

Meteorological history
- Formed: May 19, 2023
- Extratropical: June 2, 2023
- Dissipated: June 3, 2023

Violent typhoon
- 10-minute sustained (JMA)
- Highest winds: 215 km/h (130 mph)
- Lowest pressure: 900 hPa (mbar); 26.58 inHg

Category 5-equivalent super typhoon
- 1-minute sustained (SSHWS/JTWC)
- Highest winds: 305 km/h (190 mph)
- Lowest pressure: 891 hPa (mbar); 26.31 inHg

Overall effects
- Fatalities: 6 total
- Injuries: 10
- Missing: 5
- Damage: $4.3 billion (2023 USD)
- Areas affected: Federated States of Micronesia, Northern Mariana Islands, Guam, Philippines, Taiwan, Japan
- IBTrACS
- Part of the 2023 Pacific typhoon season

Typhoon Mawar, (Note: The name Mawar (Malay: mawar, [ˈma.war]) was contributed by Malaysia and means rose in Malay.) known in the Philippines as Super Typhoon Betty, was one of the strongest Northern Hemisphere tropical cyclones on record in the month of May, and the strongest tropical cyclone worldwide in 2023. The second named storm, the first typhoon and the first violent typhoon of the 2023 Pacific typhoon season, Mawar originated from an area of low pressure south-southwest of Chuuk Lagoon that developed into a tropical depression on May 19. It fluctuated in intensity and became a tropical storm, after which it intensified into a Category 4-equivalent super typhoon on the Saffir–Simpson hurricane wind scale. It then underwent an eyewall replacement cycle, then reintensified to attain 1-minute sustained winds of 305 km/h (190 mph) according to the JTWC, becoming a Category 5-equivalent super typhoon. Mawar weakened slightly as it moved around the southwestern edge of the subtropical high that made it steer north of the Philippines and then east of Taiwan. Mawar traversed the Okinawa Islands as a tropical storm, then transitioned into an extratropical cyclone as it moved northeastward out to sea, where it later dissipated east of the Kamchatka Peninsula.

Typhoon Mawar passed north of Guam as a Category 4-equivalent typhoon on May 24, bringing hurricane-force winds and heavy rain marking as the strongest storm to affect the island since Typhoon Pongsona in 2002. U.S. President Joe Biden declared Guam a major disaster area on May 27, enabling the distribution of federal funds. Two men are presumed dead after going missing in the waters off Guam; additionally, one death related to the storm has been reported in Taiwan. Mawar caused one death, one minor injury, and damage worth ₱201,696 (US$3,584) as it passed close to the eastern Philippines. Heavy rain in parts of Japan killed two people and left four people missing. At least 8,900 homes experienced power outages in Japan. Total damages from Mawar are estimated to reach US$4.3 billion.

== Meteorological history ==
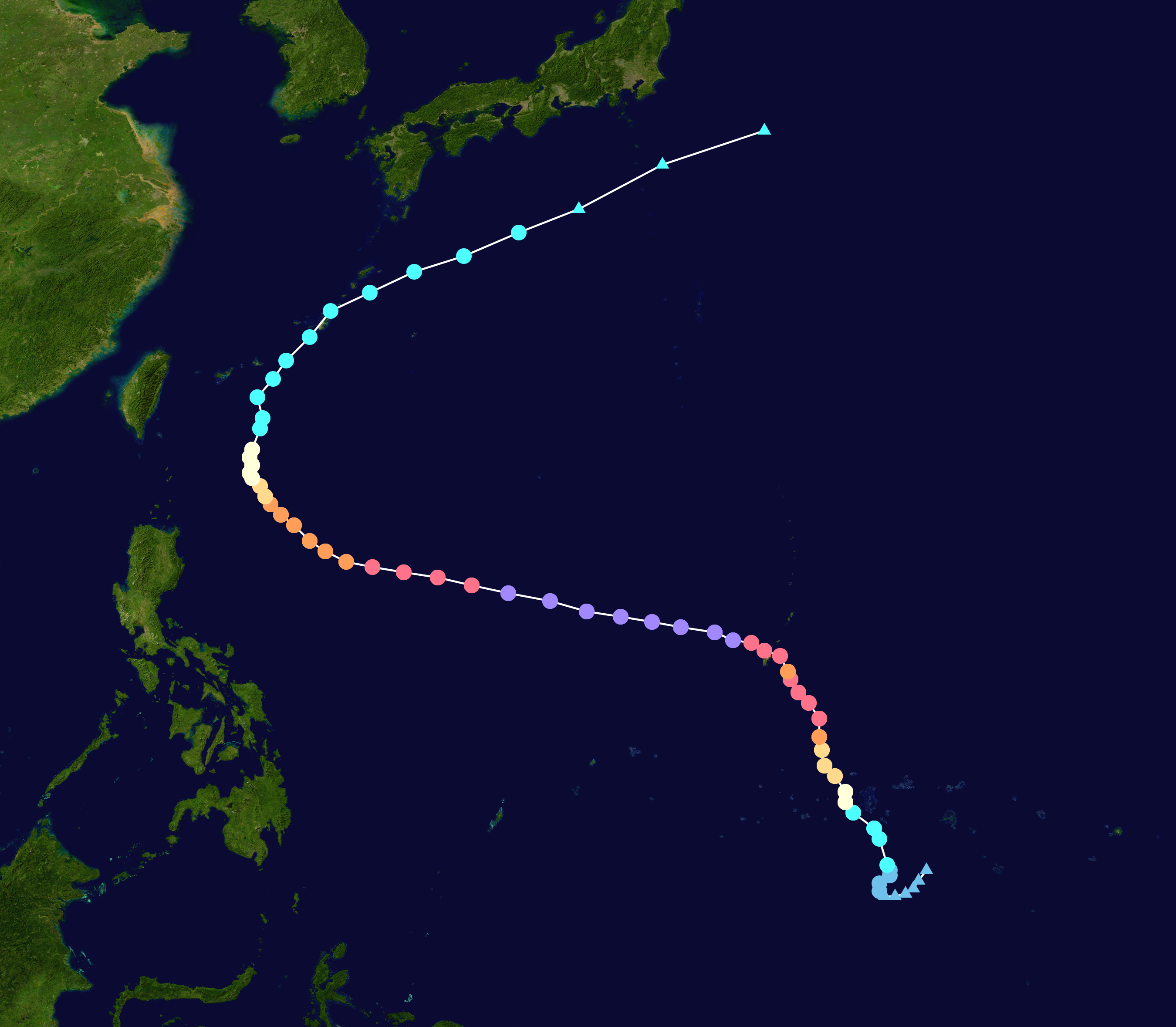
Map plotting the storm's track and intensity, according to the Saffir–Simpson scale Map key Saffir–Simpson scale Tropical depression (≤38 mph, ≤62 km/h) Tropical storm (39–73 mph, 63–118 km/h) Category 1 (74–95 mph, 119–153 km/h) Category 2 (96–110 mph, 154–177 km/h) Category 3 (111–129 mph, 178–208 km/h) Category 4 (130–156 mph, 209–251 km/h) Category 5 (≥157 mph, ≥252 km/h) Unknown Storm type Tropical cyclone Subtropical cyclone Extratropical cyclone, remnant low, tropical disturbance, or monsoon depression

On May 17, a weak low-level circulation (LLC) located 865 km (535 mi) south of Guam was marked by the Joint Typhoon Warning Center (JTWC) as Invest 97W. Global forecast models such as the Global Forecast System and Navy Global Environmental Model indicated that the disturbance would gradually intensify into a tropical cyclone in the upcoming days. The atmospheric convection broadened over the LLC the following day. Later the JTWC issued a Tropical Cyclone Formation Alert on the disturbance after thunderstorms became very wide and organization had improved. The Japan Meteorological Agency also began tracking the system, marking it as a low-pressure area shortly before upgrading it to a tropical depression on May 19. The system steered northward due to the weak trade winds. The JTWC followed suit on May 20 after the depression had strengthened from warm sea surface temperatures and poleward and westward outflow, designating it 02W. The same day, the depression upgraded to a tropical storm after a scatterometer pass revealed winds of 65 km/h (40 mph) in the southwest quadrant, as it formed a central dense overcast. The JMA in response, assigned the name Mawar to the storm. The JMA further upgraded the storm to severe tropical storm status at 00:00 UTC of May 21, as the deep convection in the CDO completely obscured the LLCC. Both the JMA and JTWC upgraded Mawar to a typhoon on May 21. An eye formed under the CDO on May 22, as rainbands wrapped around the circulation center of the system.

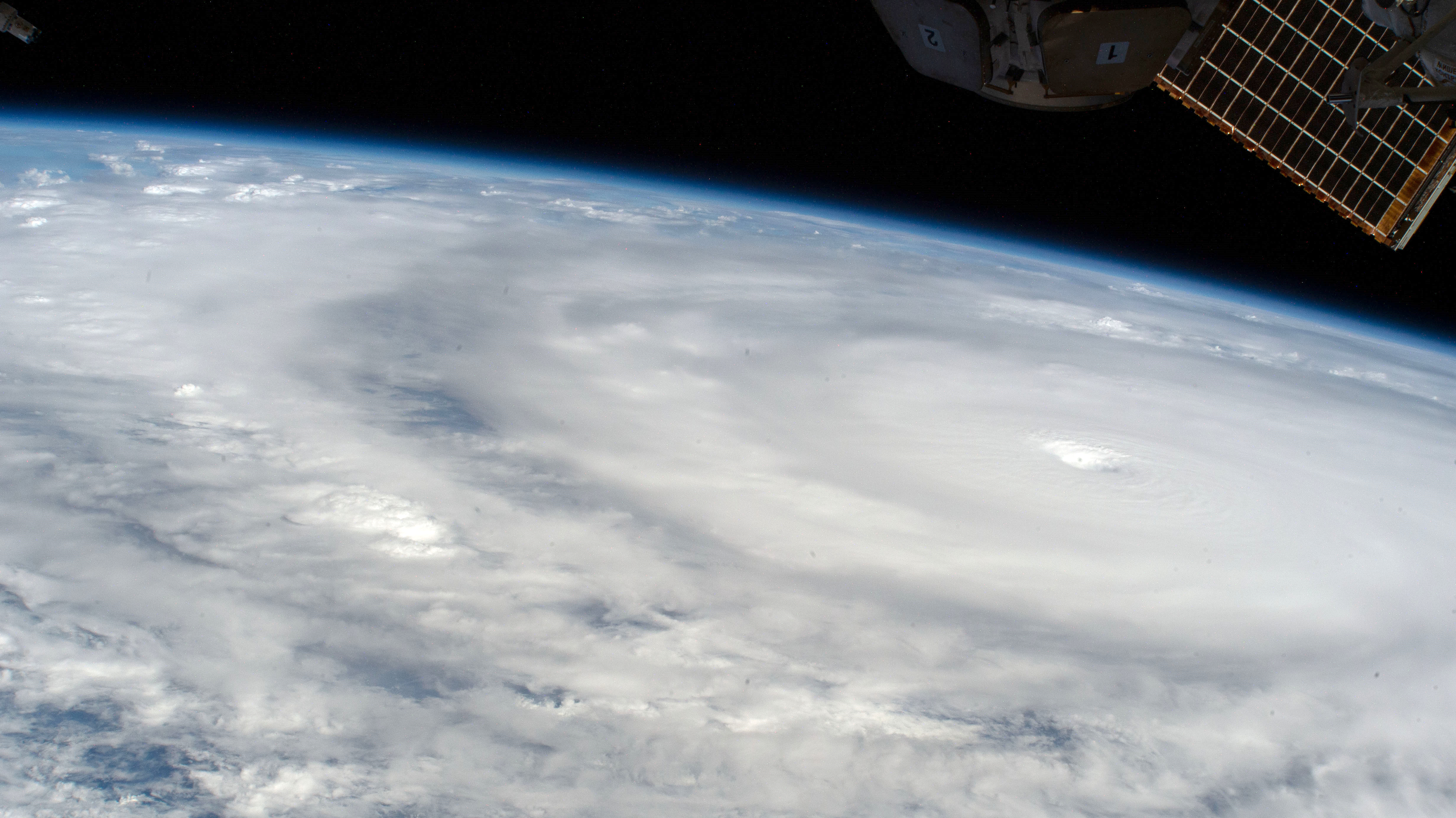
Typhoon Mawar as viewed from the International Space Station on May 23

On May 23, Mawar rapidly intensified to winds of 215 km/h (130 mph), equivalent to Category 4 strength on the Saffir–Simpson hurricane wind scale (SSHWS). Furthermore, Mawar underwent an eyewall replacement cycle. But despite usually causing the storm to weaken, the typhoon strengthened even further into a super typhoon, the highest classification of strength from the JTWC, after reaching winds of 250 km/h (155 mph). On May 24, the center of Mawar passed just off the northern tip of Guam and Andersen Air Force Base as a Category 4-equivalent typhoon with maximum sustained winds up to 140 mph with gusts up to 165 mph around 9 p.m. local time, then slightly weakened. On May 25, the aforementioned eyewall replacement cycle had been completed, and a uniform eye had appeared. Initially cloud-filled, the storm quickly cleared it out and continued strengthening slowly as it moved west-northwestward. By the next day, Mawar reached its peak intensity, attaining 1-minute sustained winds of 305 km/h (190 mph) according to the JTWC, which is equivalent to Category 5 strength on the SSHWS. It also had 10-minute sustained winds of 215 km/h (130 mph) and a minimum central barometric pressure of 900 hPa (26.58 inHg) which was assessed by the JMA. While being large and symmetrical, Mawar again went through another eyewall replacement cycle, resuming its weakening trend from the process. However, its concentric eye still remained large throughout the procedure. By 18:00 UTC of May 26, Mawar entered the Philippine Area of Responsibility (PAR), and PAGASA hence assigned it the name Betty.

On May 27, Mawar slightly weakened under the influence of dry air while moving west along the southern edge of a subtropical high. The structural degradation continued as Mawar's convection fragmented at the northern side of the storm. During that time, Mawar was situated in an area where the sea surface temperatures were 28 °C (82 °F), indicating a cooling trend as the storm's outflow became impacted by it. The CDO shrank from the dry air on May 29, while the convective decay continued on Mawar's northwest quadrant while steering north-northeastward from a subtropical ridge to the northwest and east of the storm. The eye was no longer detected on satellite imagery on May 30 as yet another weak eyewall replacement cycle commenced. As a result, Mawar weakened into a severe tropical storm as the JMA reported on May 31, before exiting the PAR on June 1. Mawar continued to further weaken into a tropical storm on June 2 whilst moving towards Okinawa Island. The following day, Mawar became an extratropical cyclone south of Honshu, as it moved towards the open Pacific.

== Preparations ==
=== Mariana Islands ===
Satellite loop of Mawar as it made its closest approach to Guam on May 24

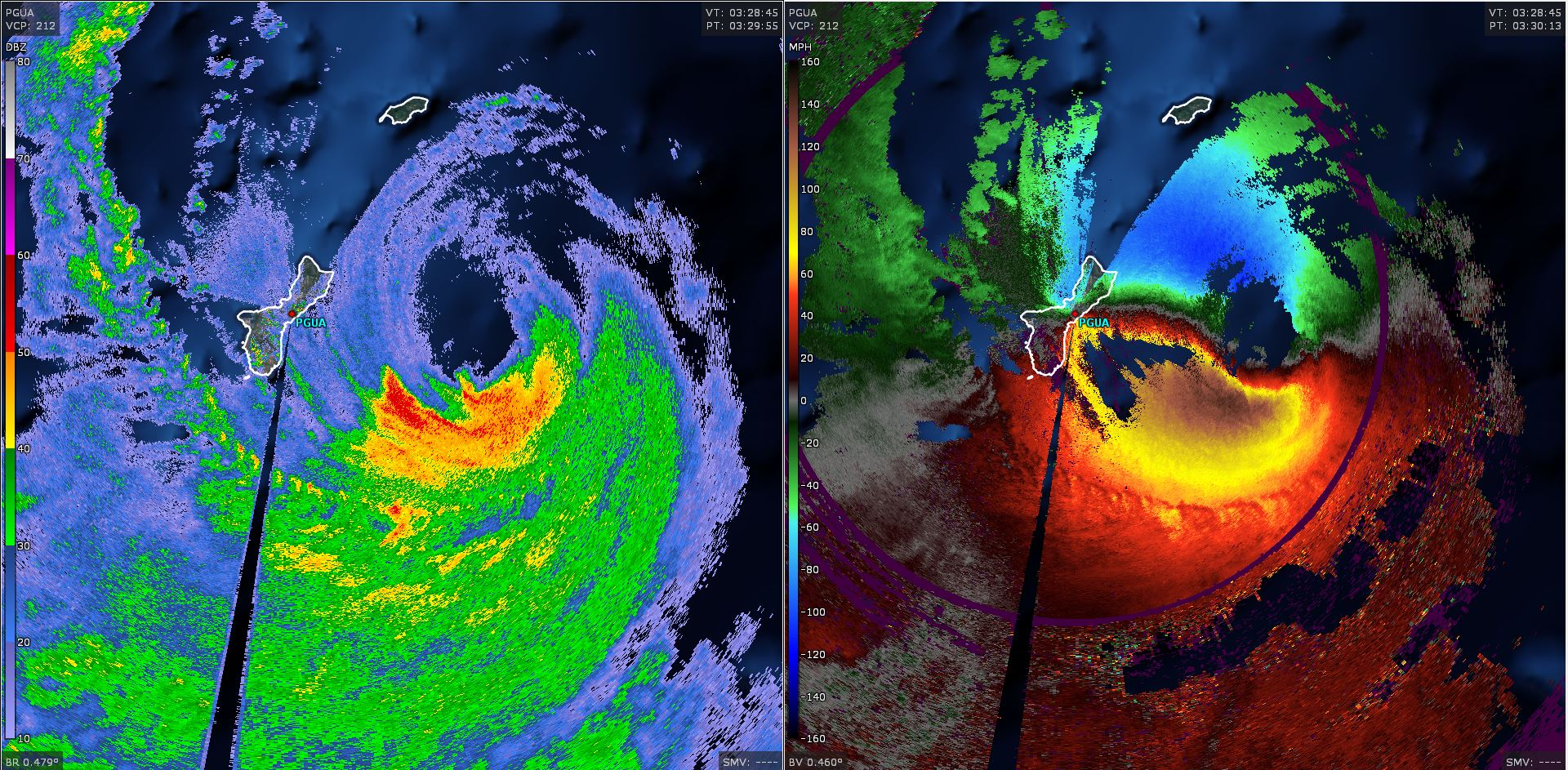
The last NEXRAD radar scans of Typhoon Mawar before the radar went out. The NEXRAD velocity (right side) had a max wind speed of 193 mph (311 km/h) about 400 feet (120 m) above the surface.

A typhoon watch was in effect for the Mariana Islands by May 21; a flood watch was also issued for the islands as the storm neared. Guam Governor Lou Leon Guerrero and Rear Admiral Benjamin Nicholson (commander of Joint Region Marianas) set the Condition of Readiness at level 3 (COR 3) on May 21 while Mawar was a tropical depression some 660 mi (1,060 km) south-southeast of Guam. Military installations on Guam began to secure facilities in response to the anticipated storm. The United States Coast Guard evacuated two of its vessels stationed on the islands out to sea. COR 2 was declared at 8 p.m. ChST later that day, prompting the closure of courts and public schools as the Government of Guam suspended nonessential services. Hospitals and clinics on Guam also curtailed services in response to the COR 2 issuance. Other neighboring islands, such as Rota and Saipan, also closed establishments in preparation for Mawar. All public schools on the Northern Marianas Islands were closed beginning on May 22. Flights to Guam were cancelled between May 22–24. The SCLC caging playoffs were also suspended due to the incoming tempest.

Leon Guerrero declared a state of emergency for Guam on May 22, stating that Mawar presented an "imminent, credible and significant threat to the health, safety and welfare of Guam." President Joe Biden approved emergency declarations for Guam and the Commonwealth of the Northern Mariana Islands the same day, enabling the allocation of federal resources to the threatened islands COR 1 was placed in effect for Guam at 1 p.m. ChST on May 23. Leon Guerrero issued an evacuation order for the Guam's low-lying coastal districts, ordering residents to evacuate to higher ground by 6 p.m. ChST later that day. Villages subject to the evacuation order included Hågat, Humåtak, Malesso, and Talo'fo'fo. The evacuation order also directed the Guam National Guard to assist evacuations. The Guam Department of Education opened emergency shelters at 12 schools at 8 a.m. ChST on May 23. By 9 p.m. ChST, 862 people were housed in government-operated shelters. The evacuation of people on military installations in threatened areas was also authorized by Nicholson.

=== Elsewhere ===
Typhoon Mawar moving away from Guam after concluding an eyewall replacement cycle on May 25

Ahead of the storm, PAGASA has issued Tropical Cyclone Wind Signal No. 1 for the eastern part of Cagayan, including the islands of Babuyan and Camiguin, as well as the eastern portion of Isabela. The agency also began raising Signal No. 2 warnings in parts of Northern Luzon. A total of 689,885 family food packages have been pre-positioned nationwide by the Department of Social Welfare and Development (DSWD) in preparation of possible landfall of Mawar. The NDRRMC has activated its emergency preparedness and response protocols. The Department of Public Works and Highways (DPWH) has begun preparing staff and equipment for the potential effects of Mawar. President Bongbong Marcos said that funds and food supplies have been set up, and emergency teams are on standby. Classes were also suspended in some areas on May 26. Five Aurora towns had their tourism activities suspended by local authorities. According to the NDRRMC, 5,990 people were preemptively evacuated.

In Taiwan, a sea warning was issued by the Central Weather Bureau. Heavy rain was anticipated in northern and eastern Taiwan. The Ministry of Transportation and Communications reported that over 25 ships on six different routes, including ferries traveling from Keelung, Taipei, Chiayi, and Pingtung County to the Matsu Islands and Penghu as well as Orchid and Green Islands, ceased operation on May 30. Due to the storm, 28 domestic flights were canceled and one was delayed. Residents of Japan's southern Sakishima Islands group, which includes the Okinawa Islands, were already preparing for the storm.

The US military, which had approximately 20,000 troops stationed in several facilities on Okinawa, stated it would take precautionary measures as the storm approaches, depending on the necessity. Flood warnings were issued by the JMA for the Okinawa island chain, as well as areas of Shikoku and Honshu islands, with 350 mm (14 in) of rain anticipated for western Honshu. Additionally, the nearby city of Yokohama received warnings of heavy rain and mudslides. According to the Fire and Disaster Management Agency, about 1.3 million people were urged to evacuate across Japan. The Ministry of Transport reported that around 300 flights and 52 ferries had been canceled on June 2.

== Impact and aftermath ==
=== Guam ===
Power outages began affecting parts of Guam on May 22 as winds from Mawar intensified up to 140 mph (230 km/h) sustained, with gusts approaching 165 mph (266 km/h). During the evening of May 24, the eye of Typhoon Mawar passed through the northern coast of Guam as it traversed the Rota Channel and Andersen Air Force Base. The local National Weather Service office issued an extreme wind warning at 5:22 p.m in effect until 6:45 p.m., but then was later extended to 10:45 p.m. for May 24th for the northern half of Guam. Antonio B. Won Pat International Airport had also recorded winds up to 104.7 miles per hour (168.5 km/h) as Mawar impacted the island when the Extreme Wind Warning was still in effect, but the office later lost its wind sensors before the height of the storm around 9 pm. The Weather Prediction Center reported that multiple locations in Guam received at least 20 inches (510 mm) of rain during Typhoon Mawar, with most of it falling in just three hours. A United States Geological Survey rain gauge in Dededo, Guam measured the most rainfall at 28.42 inches (722 mm).

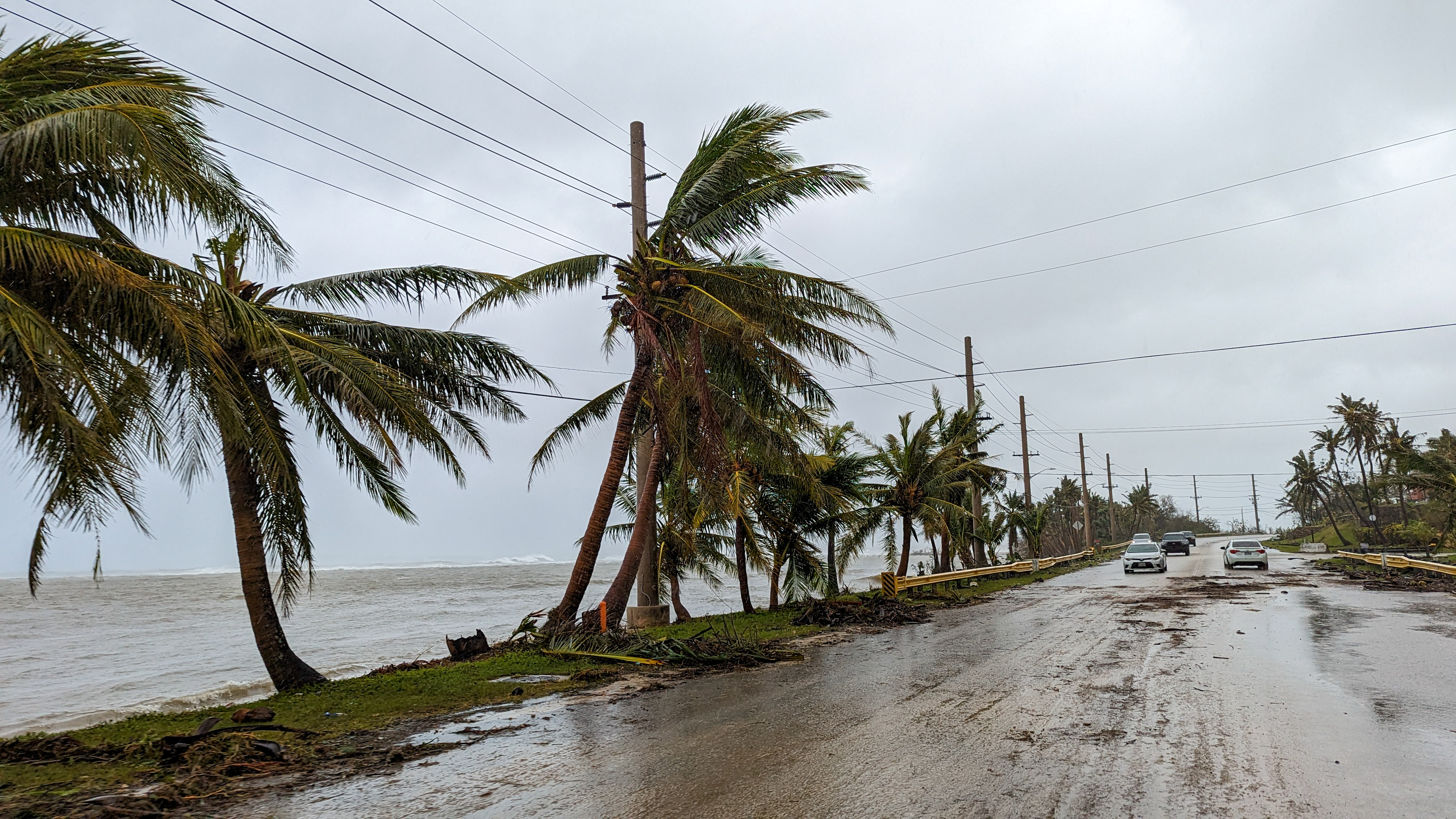
Damage in Guam from the typhoon

Despite being the strongest storm to strike the island in over 20 years, overall structural damage was relatively limited. However, the typhoon's powerful winds did defoliate and uproot trees, topple billboards, and tear tin roofing from buildings. Floodwaters in Yona were reported to be waist-deep. Guam Memorial Hospital suffered some damage as typhoon shutters gave out, walls collapsed, and windows broke. Torrential rains pouring through damaged areas of the building caused staircases to flood with water. The hospital's kitchen caught fire during the storm, leaving it useless. Four piers operated by Mobil were damaged at the Port of Guam. Along Piti Channel, three barges, two mobile crane barges, and a derelict vessel were grounded. Two tugboats sank during the storm, forcing crew members to abandon ship. A dry dock at Cabras Island sank. The Sumay Cove Marina at Naval Base Guam suffered damage. Navy Rescue 21 Search and Rescue towers were rendered inoperable. Two men were swept out to sea off Guam in separate incidents on May 25. Efforts to locate them would have no results by May 27 and the two men are presumed dead.

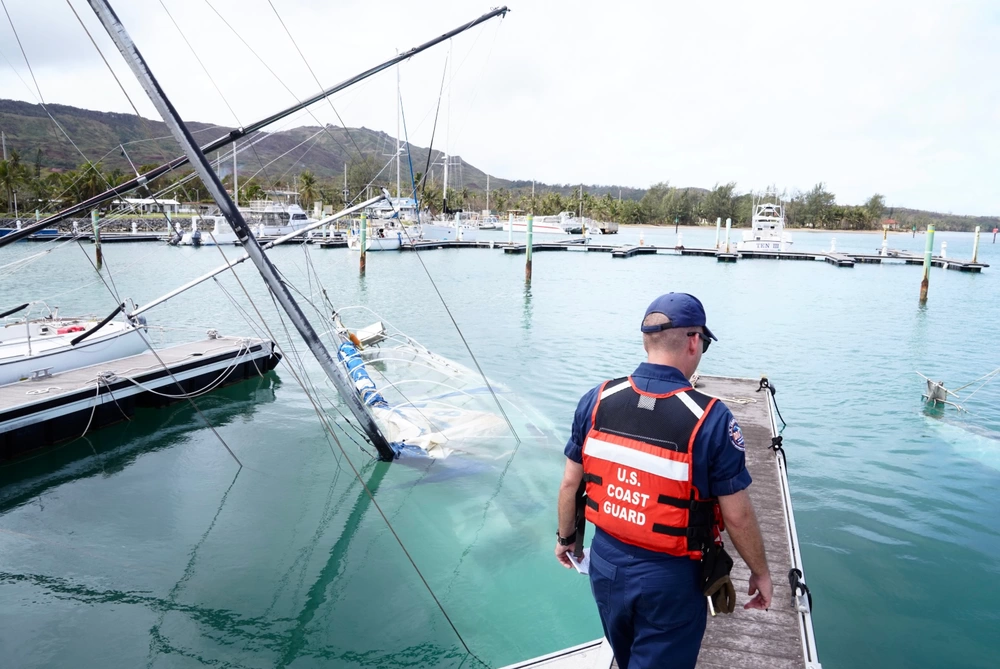
Several vessels in Agat Marina were submerged as the typhoon moved through

On the afternoon of May 26, 41.4% of Guam Power Authority substations had been energized and 3.8% of system load for customers had been restored. Additionally, the Guam Waterworks Authority (GWA) reported that 50% of operable water wells were online, with connections yet to be restored to Navy-supplied sources in Sånta Rita-Sumai and Nimitz Hill Annex. Eight public water tanks from the GWA were set up across Guam by May 28 as wat er service was slowly restored. A boil water advisory remained in place for residents with access to tap water. Telecommunication providers Docomo Pacific, GTA Teleguam (GTA), and IT&E worked to restore service. Docomo suspended data caps and distributed generators to keep services running. GTA reported repair work would not begin until power was restored. IT&E's fiber-optic network was damaged in southern Guam . As of May 30, 2023, the FCC reported that 163 cell towers remained offline: seven due to damage, but the remainder due to a lack of power. Another 120 towers were operating on backup power. A lack of power and fuel for generators, along with damage to studios and transmission facilities, kept radio and television stations off the air after the storm, too. Approximately 3,000 Korean tourists were stranded on the island as the island's international airport remained shut down due to damage caused by Typhoon Mawar. The Guam Visitors Bureau provided them with meal vouchers and refunds. Damages from Mawar to businesses were estimated to be US$111.8 million, The Guam Memorial Hospital's reported damages were at least US$12 million, and The Port Authority of Guam has estimated US$8.2 million in damages, excluding the assessments of fuel piers. The prison in Guam sustained US$2 million.

President Joe Biden declared Guam a major disaster area on May 27, enabling the distribution of federal funds. A total of 150 Federal Emergency Management Agency (FEMA) personnel were on the island by this point. Guam Delegate James Moylan penned a request to FEMA for the distribution of supplies from a warehouse containing over 1 million units of water and 900,000 meals. The Port of Guam reopened on May 28, with three United States Coast Guard Sentinel-class cutters and the Matson, Inc. cargo ship Maunawili docking with emergency supplies and food. The USCGC Sequoia (WLB-215) and Navy Explosive Ordinance Disposal Mobile Unit Five conducted sweeps around the port entrance to ensure no debris would hinder maritime traffic. Carrier Strike Group 11 with the flagship USS Nimitz was directed to Guam to assist in relief efforts. An HC-130 Hercules aircraft was sent from Coast Guard Air Station Barbers Point in Hawaii with supplies. Gas station lines reached 1 mi (1.6 km) long at times as residents flocked to refuel their cars. Supplies of fuel were available but distribution was hampered by damaged fuel piers at the Port of Guam. The Guam Police Department coordinated with fuel companies to escort fuel trucks to gas stations. The Antonio B. Won Pat International Airport opened one runway on May 28 to allow cargo planes carrying supplies and personnel to land. On May 30, more than 180 trained Red Cross disaster workers from all over the United States are on the islands, distributing relief supplies, supporting feeding efforts in community-run shelters, and assessing residential damage to help and support people affected by Mawar.

During the passage of Mawar, it had damaged a NEXRAD site in Barrigada. Initially being restored back into operation, the installment had suffered ongoing issues and as of May 25, 2025, it had been reported as "unserviceable" in NOTAMS.

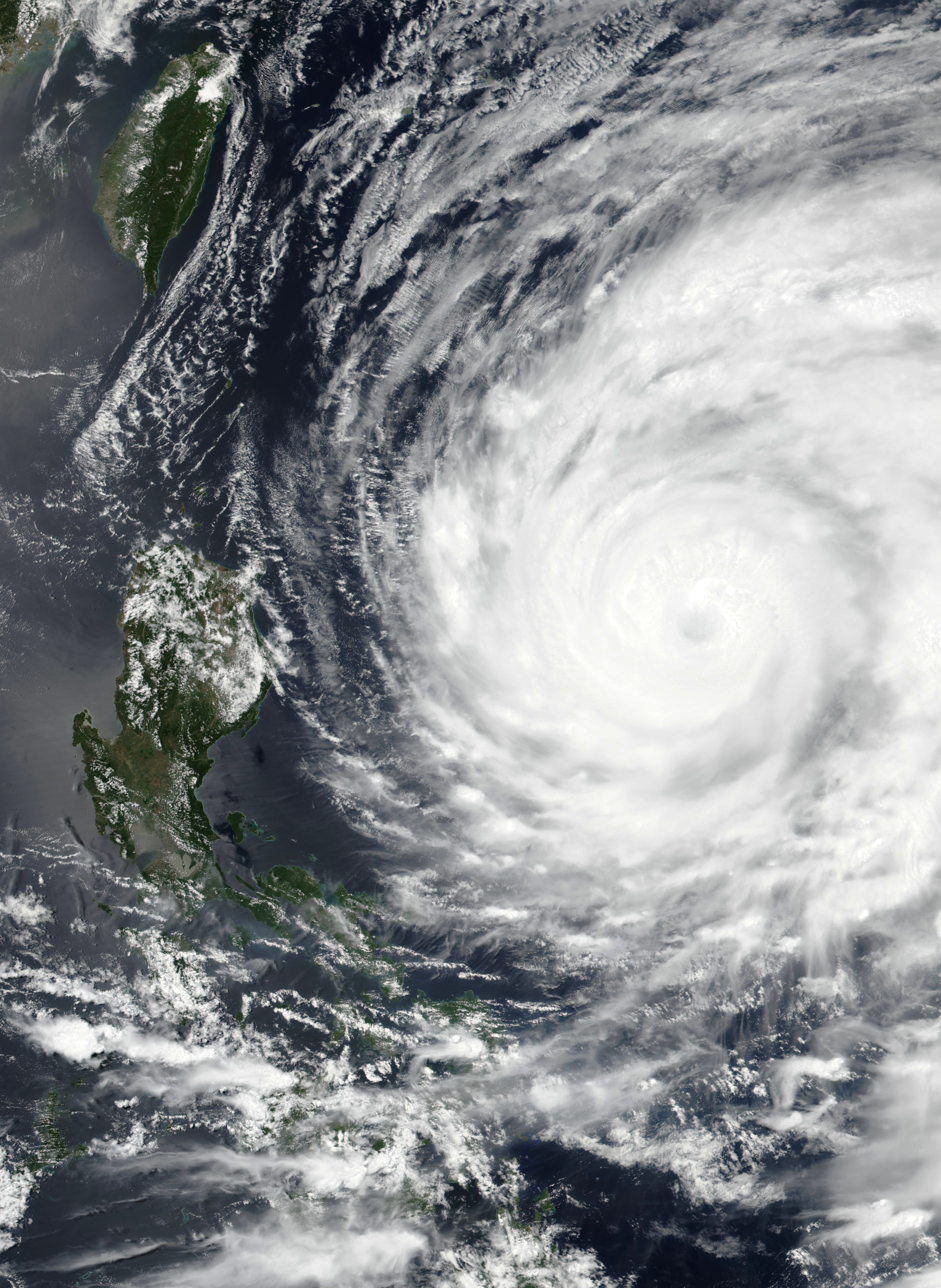
Typhoon Mawar undergoing an eyewall replacement cycle while off the coast of Luzon on May 28

=== Northern Mariana Islands ===
North of Guam, Rota suffered some damage from the storm. Trees and debris littered roadways and many residents were left without power. By May 27, only 21 people remained in shelters and were allowed to return home that day. The Commonwealth Utilities Corporation reported water service was restored by May 27. The company also offered 50 US gal (190 L) to all residents while still advising them to boil water. Roadways were cleared within a few days of the storm. The local chapter of the Red Cross planned to distribute emergency supplies. The Commonwealth of the Northern Mariana Islands Homeland Security and Emergency Management Office and the Federal Emergency Management Agency (FEMA) flew in to Rota conduct damage assessments on May 27.

=== Elsewhere ===
In the Philippines, Mawar caused a warehouse to collapse which is the only reported damage, there was one person who suffered a minor injury was reported. The NDRRMC reported 104,305 affected people. In addition, 11 houses were destroyed and 91 others were damaged. A storm surge caused by Mawar destroyed parts of the coastal town of Baler, Aurora, causing some residents to lose their homes. Mawar caused power outages in parts of Cagayan. Over 40 nipa huts from the Aeta village in San Luis, Aurora, were destroyed by the strong winds. Some tourists are stranded on the island of Batanes. A man died from a lightning strike on May 31 while fishing off the coast of Nabas, Aklan. Agricultural damages are estimated by the NDRRMC at ₱133,000, with infrastructural damages estimated at ₱68,696. In total, the NDRRMC estimates at least ₱201,696 (US$3,584) in damages.

In Taiwan, A 13-year-old boy was found dead, and a 12-year-old girl and a 25-year-old man were swept out to sea. The man made it back to land while the 12-year-old is still missing. 330 travelers were stranded on Green Island and 478 on Orchid Island, according to the MOTC. Several rivers were near the tops of their banks by mid-afternoon, and flooding was reported in Shizuoka Prefecture. A total of 8,900 homes experienced power outages.

In Okinawa's southern prefecture, one person suffered a serious injury and seven others were injured. Mawar killed two people and left four people missing. At least nine people were hospitalized with storm-related injuries in the southern prefecture of Okinawa on June 2.

== See also ==
- Weather of 2023
- Tropical cyclones in 2023
- List of typhoons in Guam
- Typhoon Karen (1962) – the most powerful typhoon to strike Guam on record
- Typhoon Pamela (1976) – an intense, May typhoon that struck Guam
- Typhoon Tip (1979) – the largest and most intense tropical cyclone ever recorded; took a similar track to Mawar
- Typhoon Omar (1992) – another powerful typhoon that struck Guam and inflicted widespread damage
- Typhoons Chataan and Pongsona (2002) – two strong typhoons which caused severe damage in the Mariana Islands
- Typhoon Songda (2011) – another powerful May typhoon that passed close to the Philippines
- Typhoon Noul (2015) – another powerful May typhoon that passed close to the Philippines
- Typhoons Mangkhut and Yutu (2018) – another pair of typhoons that affected the Marianas, with the latter becoming the most powerful typhoon to strike the archipelago
- Typhoon Surigae (2021) – another early but very powerful typhoon that brushed past the Philippines
- Typhoons Sinlaku and Bavi (2026) – two strong typhoons which caused severe damage in the Mariana Islands
