= Hurricane local statement =

Weather advisory in the United States

A hurricane local statement (HLS) is a weather statement produced for the public by the local Weather Forecast Offices of the National Weather Service in the U.S. for areas affected or forecast to be affected by a tropical storm or hurricane that provides an overview of the storm's local effects, including expected weather conditions, evacuation decisions made by local officials, and precautions necessary to protect life and property. The National Weather Services considers the HLS to be the "flagship product" available to Weather Forecast Offices for outlining tropical cyclone watches and warnings and impacts, and is their most visible product during such events. Descriptions of the affected areas, relevant tropical cyclone watches and warnings, recommendations for precautionary measures, and expected timing and severity of possible threats are typically included in an HLS. The HLS can incorporate projected impacts from pre-written descriptions tailored for different storm intensities; these template descriptions were developed in the 1990s and became widely available to forecasters for use in the HLS by 2001. The bulletin issued by the Weather Forecast Office in Slidell, Louisiana, as Hurricane Katrina approached on August 28, 2005, known as "The Bulletin", was lauded by the National Weather Service as having further encouraged vulnerable individuals to evacuate. Not all forecast offices can issue an HLS.

Locally-tailored statements regarding hurricanes have been a part of the National Weather Service's hurricane warning program since the inception of the modern National Weather Service in 1970 and were carried over from the U.S. Weather Bureau that preceded it. Such statements were formalized as the Hurricane Local Statement following the advent of the Automation of Field Operations and Services (AFOS) within the National Weather Service in 1978. Within the Advanced Weather Interactive Processing System, HLS was initially composed of two components: an automated section providing meteorological information using the National Digital Forecast Database (also known as a TCV) and a tailored section with input from the local Weather Forecast Office describing potential impacts. In 1999, the Weather Forecast Office in Melbourne, Florida, began accompanying the HLS with a suite of graphics known as a graphical HLS (gHLS). In 2009, the National Weather Service made this graphical product available for all Weather Forecast Offices along the Gulf of Mexico and Atlantic Ocean.

The original HLS format was often criticized for being unwieldy. In its service assessment following Hurricane Andrew in 1992, the National Weather Service found the HLS to be too long, redundant, and constrained by the timing of the National Hurricane Center's products. During Hurricane Irene in 2011, forecast offices in the Mid-Atlantic states and Northeastern U.S. criticized the HLS for its excessive length and broad scope. On average, there was a one-hour gap between the issuance of the TCV segment and the remainder of the HLS among the 12 Weather Forecast Offices impacted by Irene. Forecasters were also forced to debug the software responsible for issuing the statement as events unfolded. The National Weather Service later proposed that the automated and human-driven components of the HLS be issued as two separate products as part of a broader effort to improve the readability, timing, and usefulness of the product. This proposal came to fruition in 2015, scaling back the HLS to a summary product and separating it from the TCV.

== Example ==
The following hurricane local statement was issued by the National Weather Service office in Key West, Florida prior to the arrival of Hurricane Wilma.

 105   
 WTUS82 KEYW 232334 AAA  
 HLSEYW  
 FLZ076-077-078-GMZ031-032-033-052-053-054-072-073-074-075-240030-  
   
 HURRICANE WILMA LOCAL STATEMENT...UPDATED PREPAREDNESS ACTIONS  
 NATIONAL WEATHER SERVICE KEY WEST FL  
 735 PM EDT SUN OCT 23 2005  
    
 ..A HURRICANE WARNING IS IN EFFECT FOR THE FLORIDA KEYS  
    
 ..A MANDATORY EVACUATION IS IN EFFECT FOR THE FLORIDA KEYS  
   
 ..A FLOOD WATCH IS IN EFFECT FOR THE FLORIDA KEYS  
   
 ..A TORNADO WATCH IS IN EFFECT FOR THE FLORIDA KEYS  
  
   
 ..NEW INFORMATION SINCE LAST ISSUANCE  
  
 STORM INFORMATION HAS BEEN UPDATED.  
 WIND IMPACTS HAVE BEEN UPDATED.  
 PRECAUTIONARY/PREPAREDNESS ACTIONS.  
    
 ..AREAS AFFECTED  
  
 THIS STATEMENT IS SPECIFIC TO THE FLORIDA KEYS OF MONROE COUNTY.  
    
 ..WATCHES AND WARNINGS  
  
 A HURRICANE WARNING IS IN EFFECT FOR ALL OF THE FLORIDA KEYS   
 INCLUDING DRY TORTUGAS AND FLORIDA BAY...AND ALL SURROUNDING WATERS.   
 THIS MEANS THAT HURRICANE CONDITIONS ARE EXPECTED WITHIN 24 HOURS. A   
 FLOOD WATCH IS IN EFFECT FOR ALL THE FLORIDA KEYS. A TORNADO WATCH   
 IS IN EFFECT.  
    
 ..STORM INFORMATION  
   
 AT 500 PM EDT THE CENTER OF HURRICANE WILMA WAS LOCATED NEAR   
 LATITUDE 23.5 NORTH...LONGITUDE 84.9 WEST...ABOUT 210 MILES WEST   
 SOUTHWEST OF KEY WEST. WILMA WAS MOVING TOWARD THE NORTHEAST NEAR 14   
 MPH. A CONTINUED NORTHEASTWARD MOTION AND A GRADUAL INCREASE IN   
 FORWARD SPEED ARE EXPECTED TONIGHT AND MONDAY. MAXIMUM SUSTAINED   
 WINDS WERE NEAR 105 MPH WITH HIGHER GUSTS. WILMA IS A CATEGORY TWO   
 HURRICANE. SOME INCREASE IN STRENGTH IS POSSIBLE TONIGHT AND EARLY   
 MONDAY...AND WILMA COULD BE NEAR CATEGORY THREE STRENGTH AS IT NEARS   
 THE SOUTHWESTERN FLORIDA COAST. THE ESTIMATED MINIMUM CENTRAL   
 PRESSURE WAS 959 MB...OR 28.32 INCHES OF MERCURY.  
   
 ..PRECAUTIONARY/PREPAREDNESS ACTIONS  
  
 MONROE COUNTY EMERGENCY MANAGEMENT OFFICIALS HAVE RELEASED A   
 SCHEDULE TO TERMINATE THE EVACUATION OF THE FLORIDA KEYS DUE TO   
 HURRICANE WILMA. EVACUATIONS ENDED IN THE LOWER KEYS AND KEY WEST AS   
 OF 5 PM. EVACUATIONS ARE TO END AT 6 PM IN THE MIDDLE KEYS INCLUDING   
 MARATHON...AND AT 7 PM IN THE UPPER KEYS INCLUDING ISLAMORADA...KEY   
 LARGO...OCEAN REEF...AND MAINLAND MONROE COUNTY. RESIDENTS AND   
 MOTORISTS SHOULD SEEK SAFE AND STURDY SHELTER. RESIDENTS WHO HAVE   
 NOT EVACUATED AND WHO DO NOT FEEL SAFE IN THEIR HOMES...ESPECIALLY   
 IN MOBILE HOMES...CAN GO TO A REFUGE OF LAST RESORT AS FOLLOWS...KEY   
 WEST HIGH SCHOOL AT 2100 FLAGLER AVENUE...SUGARLOAF SCHOOL MILE   
 MARKER 19...STANLEY SWITLIK ELEMENTARY SCHOOL MILE MARKER 48...CORAL   
 SHORES HIGH SCHOOL MILE MARKER 90...SHERATON KEY LARGO BEACH RESORT   
 MILE MARKER 98 KEY LARGO...AND MARRIOT KEY LARGO BAY BEACH RESORT   
 MILE MARKER 103 KEY LARGO. EFFECTIVE IMMEDIATELY...THE CROWNE LA   
 CONCHA HOTEL IS NO LONGER AVAILABLE. OFFICIALS EMPHASIZE REFUGES OF   
 LAST RESORT WILL NOT BE MANNED BY LAW ENFORCEMENT OFFICIALS...AND   
 THERE WILL BE NO SUPPLIES FOR EVACUEES. EVACUEES MUST BRING THEIR   
 OWN WATER...BEDDING...AND SUPPLIES. NO PETS ARE PERMITTED AT REFUGES   
 OF LAST RESORT. MONROE COUNTY OFFICES AND COURTS ARE TO BE CLOSED   
 MONDAY AND TUESDAY. MONROE COUNTY SCHOOLS ARE TO BE CLOSED MONDAY   
 AND TUESDAY. MONROE COUNTY SCHOOL DAYTIME CUSTODIANS SHOULD REPORT   
 TUESDAY. ALL CAMPUSES OF FLORIDA KEYS COMMUNITY COLLEGE ARE TO BE   
 CLOSED MONDAY. THE CITY OF KEY WEST WILL ENACT A CURFEW FROM 10 PM   
 SUNDAY TO 7 AM MONDAY. THERE IS ALSO A VOLUNTARY CURFEW ON ALCOHOL   
 SALES AT LOCAL BARS.  
    
 ..WIND IMPACTS  
   
 SUSTAINED TROPICAL STORM FORCE WINDS WILL ARRIVE ACROSS THE LOWER   
 AND MIDDLE KEYS DURING THE NEXT FEW HOURS...AND ACROSS THE UPPER   
 KEYS BY LATE THIS EVENING. CONDITIONS ARE DETERIORATING ACROSS THE   
 LOWER KEYS AND DRIVING IS NO LONGER RECOMMENDED. RESIDENTS IN THE   
 MIDDLE AND UPPER KEYS HAVE JUST A FEW HOURS LEFT FOR EVACUATION.   
     
 ..MARINE IMPACTS  
   
 SMALL CRAFT SHOULD REMAIN IN PORT. AS THE STORM APPROACHES...WIND   
 DIRECTION WILL BE FROM THE SOUTHEAST INITIALLY. AS WILMA PASSES JUST   
 WEST AND NORTH OF THE KEYS...THE MAXIMUM WINDS WILL COME FROM THE   
 SOUTHWEST THEN WEST.   
    
 ..STORM SURGE FLOOD AND STORM TIDE IMPACTS  
   
 STORM TIDES OF 2 TO 4 FEET ON THE ATLANTIC SIDE ARE EXPECTED LATE   
 TONIGHT. THEN AS WINDS SHIFT TO THE WEST MONDAY MORNING...STORM   
 TIDES OF 5 TO 8 FEET ABOVE NORMAL ARE INDICATED ON THE GULF SIDE AND   
 THE BAY SIDE. HIGH TIDE WILL OCCUR MONDAY AT 230 AM IN KEY   
 WEST...123 AM AT VACA CUT...208 AM AT WHALE HARBOR...AND 217 AM THE   
 TAVERNIER CREEK BRIDGE OVER ROUTE 1.  
    
 ..TORNADO IMPACTS  
   
 ISOLATED TORNADOS EMBEDDED IN OUTER RAINBANDS ARE A SIGNIFICANT   
 THREAT WITH HURRICANE WILMA. A VIOLENT WATERSPOUT WAS SPOTTED 5 NM   
 WEST OF KEY WEST AT 4 PM. THE GREATEST THREAT OF TORNADOS WILL OCCUR   
 FROM THIS AFTERNOON THROUGH TOMORROW MORNING.   
    
 ..RAINFALL IMPACTS  
   
 RAINFALL TOTALS OF 4 TO 8 INCHES WITH LOCALLY HIGHER AMOUNTS ARE   
 POSSIBLE THROUGH TUESDAY. THE HEAVIEST RAINS ARE EXPECTED TONIGHT   
 AND MONDAY. SEVERE FLOODING IS POSSIBLE. IF YOU LIVE IN A HIGHLY   
 FLOOD-PRONE AREA TAKE ACTION TO PROTECT PROPERTY.   
   
 ..NEXT UPDATE  
  
 THE NEXT HURRICANE WILMA LOCAL STATEMENT WILL BE ISSUED AROUND 830   
 PM...OR SOONER IF NEW INFORMATION BECOMES AVAILABLE. VISIT OUR KEY   
 WEST NATIONAL WEATHER SERVICE WEBSITE AT WWW.WEATHER.GOV/KEYWEST.  

== See also ==
- Tropical cyclone watches and warnings
