= Tropical Storm Jangmi (2026) =

Pacific severe tropical storm in 2026

Severe Tropical Storm Jangmi (Domeng)
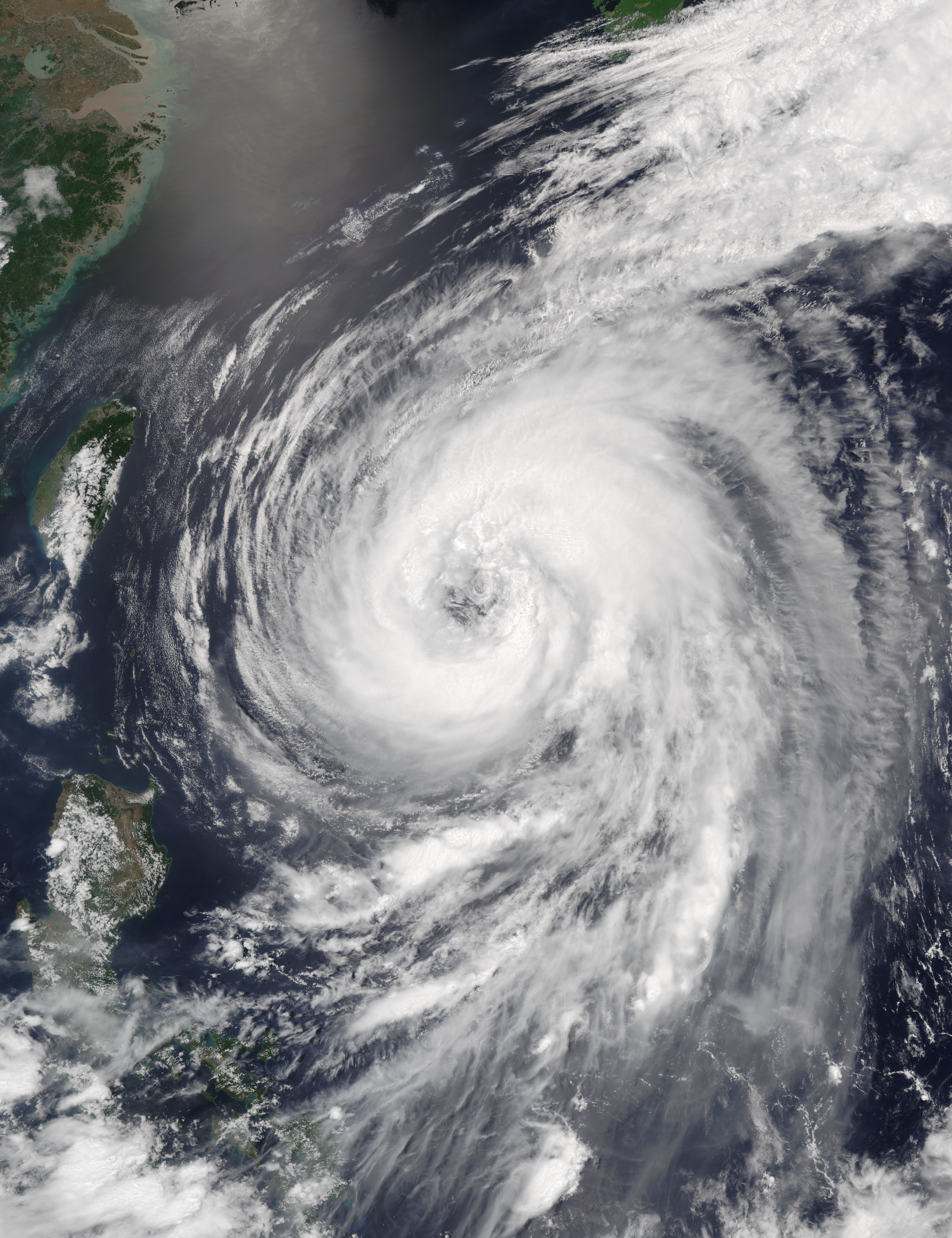
- Jangmi at its peak intensity near Ryukyu Islands on May 31

Meteorological history
- Formed: May 26, 2026
- Extratropical: June 3, 2026
- Dissipated: June 6, 2026

Severe tropical storm
- 10-minute sustained (JMA)
- Highest winds: 110 km/h (70 mph)
- Lowest pressure: 970 hPa (mbar); 28.64 inHg

Category 1-equivalent typhoon
- 1-minute sustained (SSHWS/JTWC)
- Highest winds: 130 km/h (80 mph)
- Lowest pressure: 976 hPa (mbar); 28.82 inHg

Overall effects
- Injuries: 35
- Damage: >$3.1 million (2026 USD)
- Areas affected: Philippines, Japan (particularly Ryukyu Islands, Amami Ōshima, Kyushu, Shikoku, Kansai region, Kantō region)
- Part of the 2026 Pacific typhoon season

Severe Tropical Storm Jangmi (Note: The name Jangmi (Korean: 장미, [t͡ɕa̠ŋmi]) was contributed by South Korea and means rose in Korean.), known in the Philippines as Typhoon Domeng, was a large and moderately strong tropical cyclone that enhanced the southwest monsoon in the Philippines, which indirectly affected the country in late May, and then hit the Ryukyu Islands and mainland Japan in early June. It is also the sixth named storm of the 2026 Pacific typhoon season.

The precursor disturbance to Jangmi formed on May 25, over 400 km east-southeast of Yap. Its chances for development later rose as it moved into more favorable conditions. The JMA identified the system as a tropical depression on May 26, before it intensified into a tropical storm on May 27, assigning it the name Jangmi. The Joint Typhoon Warning Center (JTWC) followed suit that day, designating the system as Tropical Depression 06W. On May 29, Jangmi entered the Philippine Area of Responsibility (PAR), receiving the local name Domeng from PAGASA, before it was upgraded into a severe tropical storm. The JTWC upgraded the storm into a Category 1 typhoon on May 30, although it would be downgraded back to a tropical storm on June 1 as it encountered less favorable conditions. On June 3, Jangmi landfall over Wakayama Prefecture in Japan, before skirting eastwards past the rest of mainland Japan over the next day. By the next morning local time, Jangmi had completed its transition into an extratropical cyclone, and ultimately ceased to exist as a weather system on June 6.

Damage to infrastructure caused by Jangmi in the Philippines topped to ₱3.4 million, specifically in the Bangsamoro Autonomous Region of Muslim Mindanao (BARMM) region. In Japan, several airline companies in the country, including the Haneda Airport, have cancelled nearly 900 international and nationwide flights, while some bullet train and railway services, including the East Japan Railway were suspended in some areas of the country. 57 houses were partially damaged, while 23 injuries were also reported in the country nationwide. Some road intersections, especially in the Tokyo area, were either flooded or collapsed due to the storm.

== Meteorological history ==
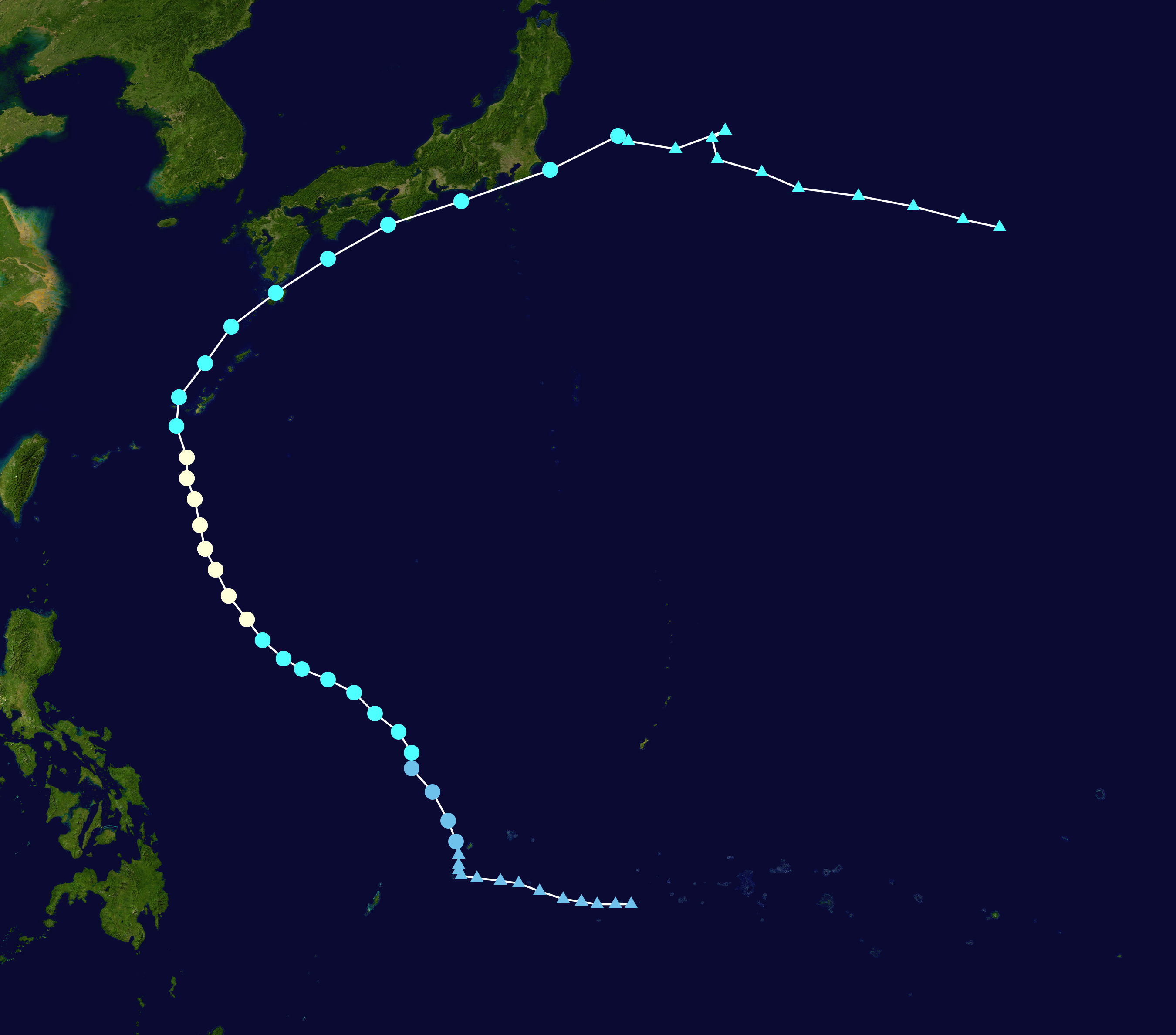
Map plotting the storm's track and intensity, according to the Saffir–Simpson scale Map key Saffir–Simpson scale Tropical depression (≤38 mph, ≤62 km/h) Tropical storm (39–73 mph, 63–118 km/h) Category 1 (74–95 mph, 119–153 km/h) Category 2 (96–110 mph, 154–177 km/h) Category 3 (111–129 mph, 178–208 km/h) Category 4 (130–156 mph, 209–251 km/h) Category 5 (≥157 mph, ≥252 km/h) Unknown Storm type Tropical cyclone Subtropical cyclone Extratropical cyclone, remnant low, tropical disturbance, or monsoon depression

On May 25, the JTWC reportedly marked a low-pressure area for development that spawned 239 nm (443 km) east-southeast of Yap, with satellite imagery indicating that the disturbance was in a moderately favorable environment for tropical cyclogenesis. The system was described as broad and poorly organized partially obscured by flaring convection. At 00:00 UTC of the following day, the disturbance's chances for tropical cyclone development in the next 24 hours were upgraded to medium, as it continued to show signs of organization and development with flaring convection within the southern periphery. At 00:00 UTC on May 26, the JMA initiated its first prognostic reasoning of the system; upgrading it as a tropical depression. The storm slowly moved west-northwestward along the southern portion of a subtropical high. At 15:00 UTC, JTWC issued a Tropical Cyclone Formation Alert (TCFA), predicting tropical cyclone formation within 24 to 48 hours. The storm had a favorable environment with low-to-moderate vertical wind shear, warm sea surface temperatures (SST), and moderate poleward upper-level outflow.

Early on May 27, JMA reportedly upgraded the depression into a tropical storm, receiving the name Jangmi. JTWC later followed suit at 21:00 UTC and designated Jangmi as 06W. Later, the system was cited with an ill-defined low-level circulation center (LLCC), with a stronger mid-level vortex that generates strong relative vorticity. On May 28, the storm moved north-northwestward along the southern periphery of a subtropical high, although it maintained its intensity due to limited firmness. Later at 15:00 UTC, JTWC then upgraded Jangmi into a tropical storm, entering favorable conditions for continuous development, and having a partially exposed LLCC from infrared imagery. At 00:30 PHT on May 29 (16:30 UTC on the previous day), Jangmi entered the Philippine Area of Responsibility (PAR), assigning the local name Domeng by PAGASA.Satellite imagery indicated that Jangmi had significantly improved convective signature associated with the storm as it transits along the southwestern periphery of a building subtropical ridge centered to the northeast. Meanwhile, an animated multispectral satellite imagery (MSI) showed some cumulonimbus clusters gathering around the storm's cloud system center (CSC), forming a curved band.

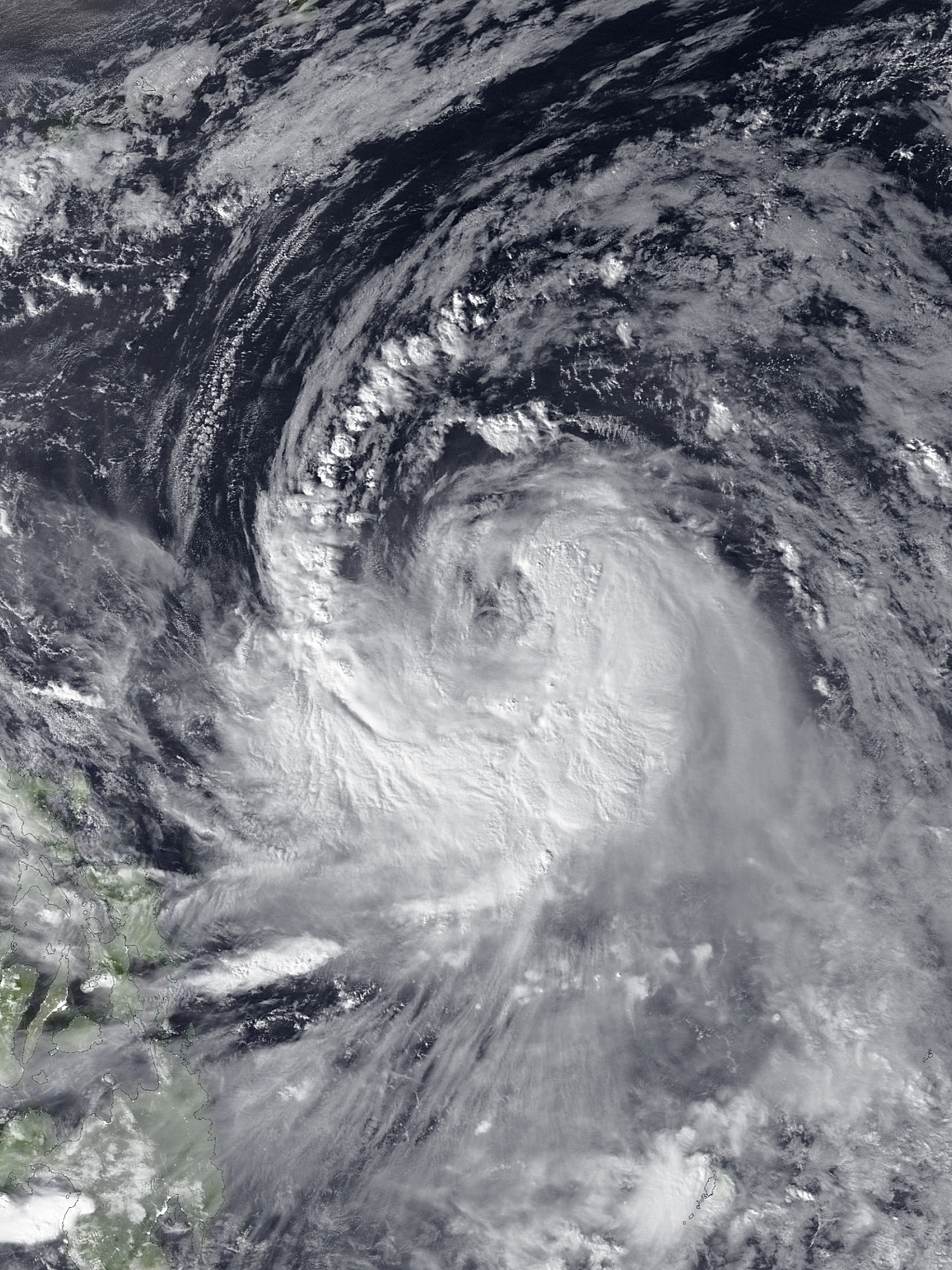
Jangmi intensifying east of the Philippines on May 29

At 23:00 PHT (15:00 UTC), PAGASA upgraded Jangmi into a severe tropical storm. JMA followed suit on the next day, also classifying Jangmi as a severe tropical storm. On May 30, at 09:00 UTC, the presence of favorable environment later helped Jangmi strengthen into a Category 1-typhoon, with satellite imagery depicting an irregular LLCC, and four mesovortices imparting a quasi-quadrilateral eyewall geometry. The JMA reported that the storm had temporal suspension of development, causing it to maintain its intensity. However, the storm later showed good cloud characteristics of anticyclonic outflow. On May 31, satellite imagery reported that Jangmi had a very large (70 nm diameter) eye feature as it depicted the improvement of the convective structure. But at 18:00 UTC, Jangmi entered an insufficient environment, inhibiting further development, while still moving north-northwestwards between two subtropical highs.

On June 1, at 09:00 UTC, the JTWC downgraded Jangmi into a tropical storm with a ragged, cloud-filled LLCC south of Kadena Air Base, due to dry, mid-level subsident air that causes the southwestern eyewall to rapidly degrade. The storm started to move northward, with low sea-surface temperatures, low tropical cyclone heat potential, and weak vertical wind shear. As the storm transited to the south end of Kyushu on June 2, Jangmi discovered highly unfavorable conditions with dry air entrainment and weak poleward outflow. Then, the storm started moving northeastward under the influence of prevailing westerlies concurrent to active convective cloud clusters separating from the CSC. On June 3, at 04:30 JST (19:30 UTC of the previous day), Jangmi made landfall over Wakayama Prefecture in western Japan. Microwave imagery revealed that the storm had poorly defined lower-level cloud banding. At 12:00 UTC, while moving in an east-northeastwards direction, JMA issued their final advisory on Jangmi as the system continued to weaken, declaring it an extratropical cyclone.

== Preparations ==
=== Philippines ===
Although Jangmi did not directly affect the country, it prompted the PAGASA to declare the start of the southwest monsoon on May 30, citing the presence of southwesterly winds over the western section of the country over the past days. PAGASA also mentioned that despite the storm having a small chance of making landfall in the Philippines, its trough could still bring cloudy skies with moderate to heavy rains over Eastern Visayas and Caraga over the weekend.

Early on May 26, the Department of Social Welfare and Development prepared 4.7 million family food packs to be distributed to families who need assistance amid the storm's impact. The department also prepared standby funds and stockpiles that top up to ₱5.3 billion (US$86.17 million) in case if the storm makes an impact to the country. On May 29, the Department of Health (DOH) raised a code white alert for those areas that are going to be affected by the storm. Regional offices of the department were also said to be on guard. Two days later, the Philippine National Police (PNP) Chief General Jose Melencio Nartatez Jr. said that police offices in areas that may be affected by Jangmi were directed to remain alert for possible effects, and to respond to requests for assistance in coordination with local government units (LGUs).

=== Japan ===
On June 1, residents on Okinawa and the Amami islands were urged by authorities to stay on high alert, while elderly people were warned to evacuate in parts of the aforementioned islands. On the same day, during a news conference, government spokesperson Minoru Kihara warned that public transport in Tokyo and nearby cities would face disruptions as the storm approaches on June 3. He also told those who are living in areas that are likely to be storm-affected to stay mindful of early evacuation, and to remain vigilant and take action to protect their lives. On June 2, the Embassy of Singapore in Tokyo advised those Singaporeans in Japan to keep their valuables in waterproof bags to prevent damage to these items. This caused the Singapore Airlines to reschedule at least 14 flights from Singapore to Japan between June 2–3.

Authorities raised a level-4 flood emergency warning near the Kumozu, Kumozu Furukawa, Zenpukuji, Meguro, Kanda, Nogawa, Sengawa, and Tategawa rivers. Another level-4 flood emergency warning was also raised in the Hiroto River of Nichinan, Miyazaki. A level-5 flood emergency warning, which became the highest warning of the country's new weather warning system, was raised in the Kozagawa river of Wakayama Prefecture.

== Impact ==
=== Philippines ===
According to the National Disaster Risk Reduction and Management Council (NDRRMC), 85,295 individuals were displaced by the storm in the Bangsamoro Autonomous Region of Muslim Mindanao (BARMM) alone. Damage to infrastructure in the region reached ₱3.4 million (US$55,055.42), according to the Office of Civil Defense (OCD), which were reported in Sultan sa Barongis, Maguindanao del Sur alone. Authorities said that all affected facilities in the municipality are not serviceable.

=== Japan ===
82,921 people were evacuated across five municipalities in Okinawa Prefecture. Twenty-seven municipalities in the prefecture lost power. On June 1, 250 flights were cancelled across Japan, with 200 of them being cancelled at Haneda Airport. On June 3, Japan Airlines and All Nippon Airways cancelled nearly 900 international and domestic flights. Toyota Motor suspended operations in 13 domestic plants, while Suzuki Motor halted work at all plants in Shizuoka Prefecture.Some bullet train services in Kyūshū and the southwest and west areas of Japan (Kansai, Shikoku, Chūgoku, and Hokuriku regions) were delayed, while the East Japan Railway suspended some services in the Tokyo area.Authorities urged the entire population of Miyazaki City, which is around 390,000 people, to evacuate their homes.Few trees and debris fell and scattered across the Torii Station of Yomitan, Okinawa, while a large banyan tree in Music Town Otoichiba toppled during the storm's onslaught.

17 injuries were reported in Okinawa, while two injuries were reported in Kagoshima Prefecture. The Miyazaki, Tokushima, Nara, and Aichi prefectures each reported one injury, totalling up to 23 injuries. According to the Fire and Disaster Management Agency, 57 houses were partially damaged, including 48 of them, which were reported in Kagoshima. A road intersection in Saiwai-ku, Kawasaki flooded, while a section of a national highway of Ōta, Tokyo inundated. A section of the National Route 371, which runs along the Kozagawa River, collapsed. 1,800 households in Ōme, Tokyo were left without water supply, while some tree branches entangled to overhead wires in the Hachiko Line, specifically between the Haijima and Komagawa stations.The Zenpukuji River in Suginami, Tokyo also got swollen in the middle of heavy rainfall.The Himeji Castle in Hyōgo Prefecture, which is a UNESCO world heritage site in western Japan, sustained damage in its exterior walls.In Tsu City of Mie Prefecture, some riverbanks of the Kumozu and Kumozu Furukawa rivers bursted, while a nearby curry restaurant in the city was badly hit. A part of the National Route 260 highway that connects towns along the east coast of the prefecture collapsed, cutting off access to residents in Minamiise. Some large seawalls got crashed by large waves in the Izu Ōshima island, while some roads in Chiyoda, Tokyo, especially in the Kasumigaseki district, submerged. In Hiratsuka of Kanagawa Prefecture, a large zelkova tree snapped through a university parking lot.

== See also ==
- Weather of 2026
- Tropical cyclones in 2026
- Typhoon Songda (2011; Chedeng) - a strong typhoon which almost had an identical track with Jangmi
- Typhoon Noul (2015; Dodong) - took a similar trajectory up into Japan, although being much stronger
- Tropical Storm Peipah (2025; Kiko) - brushed the Japanese coast and impacted the Ryukyu Islands in a similar manner
