= Japan–Singapore relations =

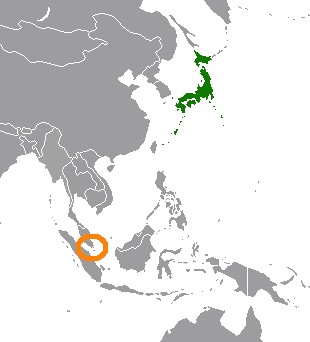
- Japan: Singapore

Diplomatic mission
- Japanese Embassy, Singapore: Embassy of Singapore, Tokyo; Consulate General, Osaka; Consulate General, Nagoya

Envoy
- Ambassador Jun Yamazaki: Ambassador Ong Eng Chuan

Japan–Singapore relations or Singapore–Japan relations (Note: (Japanese: 日本とシンガポールの関係 Nihon to Shingapōru no kankei Malay: Hubungan Singapura-Jepun Chinese: 新加坡－日本關係 Tamil: சிங்கப்பூர்-ஜப்பான் உறவுகள்)) refers to the bilateral relations between Japan and Singapore, two highly developed Asian countries which share historical, economic, and political ties. While the two countries first established bilateral relations in 1966, some of the earliest relations date back from before the 15th century during the Muromachi period as well as the Ryukyu Kingdom. This continued for centuries until the most notable interaction with Japan's invasion of Singapore during World War II. The invasion led to a takeover of the country, after which Japan occupied Singapore for approximately four years before withdrawing following their loss in the war.

The two countries now benefit from heavy mutual trade, formally established through the 2002 Japan–Singapore Economic Partnership Agreement (JSEPA), which was Japan's first ever economic partnership agreement with another country.

Japan maintains an embassy in Tanglin, Singapore. Singapore has an embassy in Minato, Tokyo in addition to consulates-general in Sakai, Osaka and Nagoya. The current Japanese Ambassador to Singapore is Jun Yamazaki and the current Singaporean Ambassador to Japan is Ong Eng Chuan.

== Timeline ==
Empire of Japan
Occupied Japan
Japan
Straits Settlement
Syonan-to
British colony of Singapore
State of Malaysia
Singapore
│
1930
│
1935
│
1940
│
1945
│
1950
│
1955
│
1960
│
1965
│
1970
│
1975
│
1980
│
1985
│
1990
│
1995
│
2000
│
2005
│
2010
│
2015
│
2020
│
2025

Leaders of the two countries (Shōwa period)

Leaders of the two countries (Heisei period)

Leaders of the two countries (Reiwa period)

== History ==
=== First contacts ===
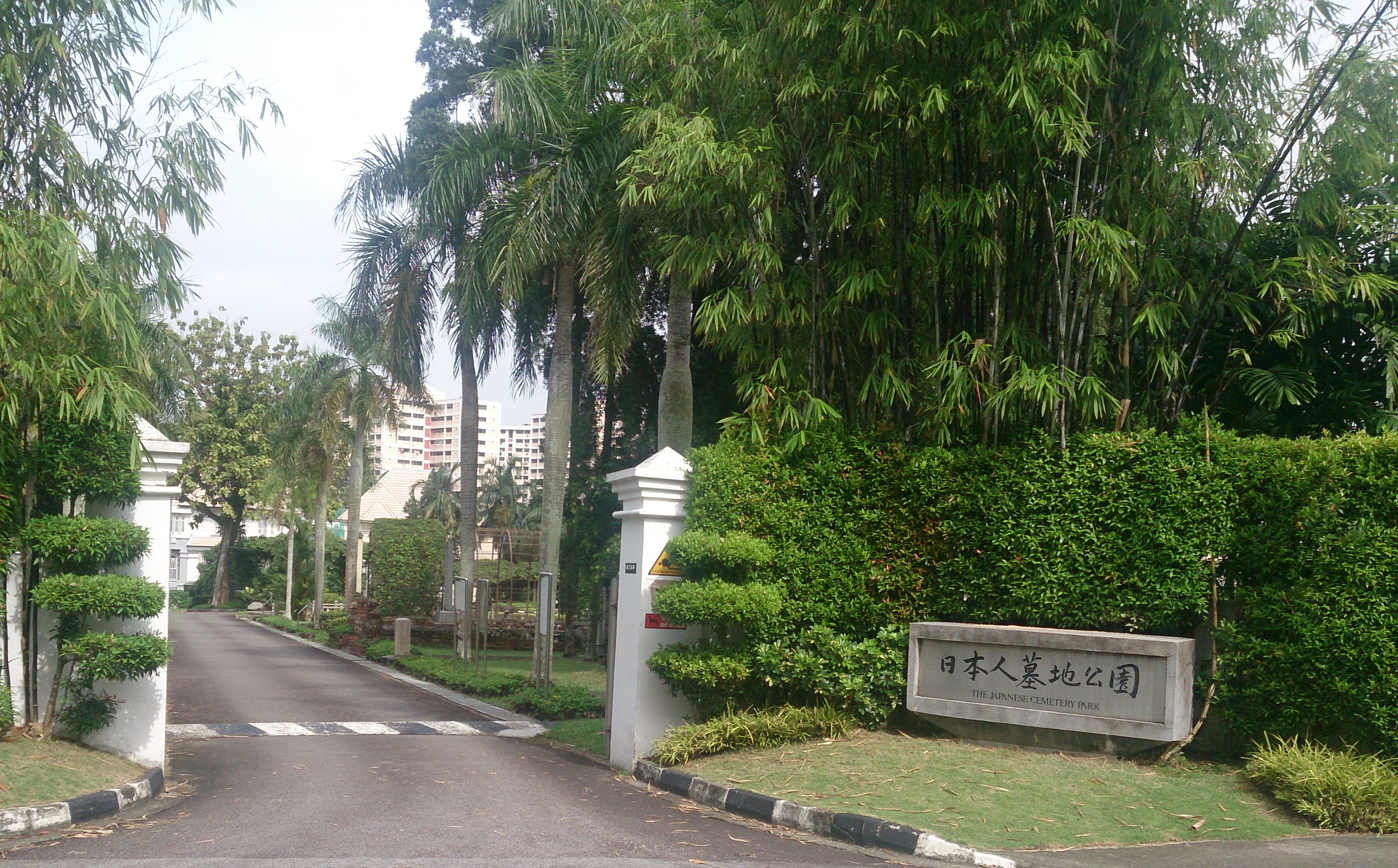
Entrance to the Japanese Cemetery Park

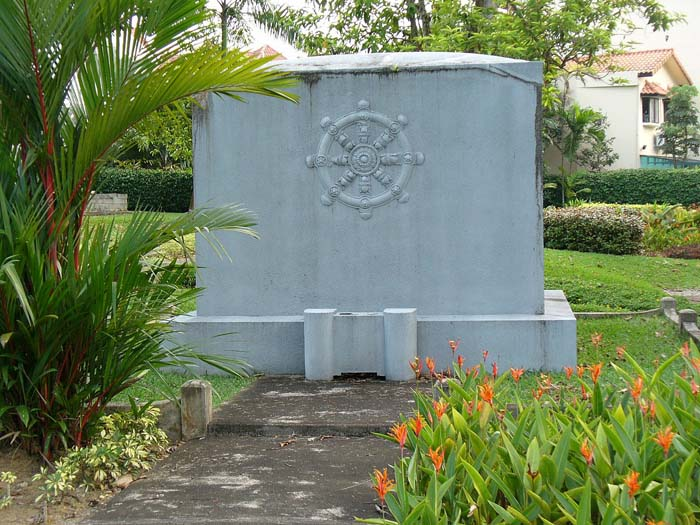
The tombstone of Yamoto Otokichi in Singapore

The Ryūkyū Kingdom held trade relations with Singapore when it was under the Malacca Sultanate in the 15th century. Its maritime trade with the kingdom included Japanese products—silver, swords, fans, lacquerware, folding screens—and Chinese products—medicinal herbs, minted coins, glazed ceramics, brocades, textiles—were traded for sappanwood, rhino horn, tin, sugar, iron, ambergris, ivory and frankincense. Altogether, 150 voyages between the two kingdoms on Ryūkyūan ships were recorded in the Rekidai Hōan, an official record of diplomatic documents compiled by the kingdom, as having taken place between 1424 and the 1630s, with 61 of them bound for Siam, 10 for Malacca, 10 for Pattani and 8 for Java, among others.

=== Colonial era ===
Singapore's first resident of Japanese origin is believed to be Yamamoto Otokichi, originally from Mihama, Aichi. In 1832, he was working as a crewman on a Japanese boat which was caught in a storm and drifted across the Pacific Ocean; after a failed attempt to return home, he began to work as an interpreter and he settled in Singapore in 1862. He died five years later and was buried at the Japanese Cemetery Park (Japanese: 日本人墓地公園 Nihonjin bochi kōen) in Singapore. It opened in 1891 and is the largest Japanese cemetery outside of Japan at 29,359 square metres, consisting of tombstones that contain the remains of members of the Japanese people in Singapore, including young Japanese prostitutes, civilians, soldiers and convicted war criminals executed in Changi Prison. It was gazetted as a memorial park by the Singapore government in 1987.

However, most early Japanese residents of Singapore consisted largely of prostitutes, who would later become known by the collective name of "karayuki-san". The earliest Japanese prostitutes are believed to have arrived 1870 or 1871; by 1889, there were 134 of them. From 1895 to 1918, Japanese authorities turned a blind eye to the emigration of Japanese women to work in brothels in other parts of Asia. According to the Japanese consul in Singapore, almost all of the 450 to 600 Japanese residents of Singapore in 1895 were prostitutes and their pimps, or concubines; fewer than 20 were engaged in "respectable trades". In 1895, there were no Japanese schools or public organisations, and the Japanese consulate maintained only minimal influence over their nationals; brothel owners were the dominating force in the community. Along with victory in the Sino-Japanese War, the Japanese state's increasing assertiveness brought changes to the official status of Japanese nationals overseas; they attained formal legal equality with Europeans. That year, the Japanese community was also given official permission by the government to create their own cemetery, on twelve acres of land in Serangoon outside of the urbanised area; in reality, the site had already been used as a burial ground for Japanese as early as 1888.

However, even with these changes in their official status, the community itself remained prostitution-based. Prostitutes were the vanguard of what one pair of scholars describes as the "karayuki-led economic advance into Southeast Asia". It was specifically seen by the authorities as a way to develop a Japanese economic base in the region; profits extracted from the prostitution trade were used to accumulate capital and diversify Japanese economic interests. The prostitutes served as both creditors and customers to other Japanese: they loaned out their earnings to other Japanese residents trying to start businesses, and patronised Japanese tailors, doctors, and grocery stores. By the time of the Russo-Japanese War, the number of Japanese prostitutes in Singapore may have been as large as 700 and were concentrated around Middle Road. However, with Southeast Asia cut off from European imports due to World War I, Japanese products began making inroads as replacements, triggering the shift towards retailing and trade as the economic basis of the Japanese community.

Singapore abolished licensed Japanese prostitution in 1921. This was part of a larger governmental plan to entirely end legalised prostitution throughout the peninsula. In spite of the ban, many attempted to continue their profession clandestinely; however, both the Singaporean and Japanese governments made efforts to clamp down on the trade. By 1927, there remained roughly 126 independent Japanese prostitutes. Most eventually left Singapore or moved on to other trades. Their departure coincided with a significant shift in the composition of the Japanese population there: the businesses they patronised, such as tailors and hairdressers, run largely by Japanese men, also shut their doors, and their proprietors left as well, to be replaced by salaried employees working in Japanese trading firms. Only 14 Japanese men worked in such professions in 1914, but by 1921 there were 1,478. The shift would continue in the following decade: in 1919, 38.5% of Japanese in Singapore were commodity merchants and 28.0% company and bank employees, but by 1927, these proportions had shifted sharply, to 9.7% merchants and 62.9% employees.

The Japanese population would peak in 1929 and then decline until 1933, as a result of the world-wide Great Depression. However, it would recover somewhat after that, aided by devaluation of the yen and the consequent increase in competitiveness of Japanese products in Southeast Asian markets. Even as other Japanese businesses suffered declines, the number of fishermen grew, from a small base of about 200 individuals in 1920 to a peak of 1,752 in 1936, accounting for between one-quarter and one-third of the resident Japanese population throughout the 1930s.

=== Battle of Singapore ===
Japan's earliest notable interaction as a nation with Singapore occurred while Singapore was still a part of the Straits Settlements. Coinciding with the December 8th surprise attack on the US naval base Pearl Harbor and the same-day attack of the British colony of Hong Kong, the Japanese empire also launched an attack on the Straits Settlements. Japan, having taken control of French Indochina in 1940, was able to launch multiple attacks and, partly due to an alliance with Thailand, took control of large swathes of the Malay Archipelago over the next two months, concurrently bombing Singapore with increasing frequency. On 31 January 1942, Malaya fell to the Japanese, and the last of the retreating Allied forces destroyed the bridge between Malaya and Singapore and began to prepare for a full attack on Singapore.

While destroying the bridge created a slight delay, the Japanese reached Singapore on 8 February, launching into the Battle of Sarimbun Beach. After a successful victory, Japan then launched into their second stage of the attack, during which they sustained heavy casualties but was ultimately victorious due to a miscommunication between Allied officers. From here the Japanese continued to press east, ultimately taking the strategically important Bukit Timah and then moving south to take Pasir Panjang. By 15 February, food and water rations were low, weapon ammunition was almost exhausted, and a final meeting was held in which Allied officers agreed that no counterattack would be possible. At 17:15, Lieutenant-General Arthur Percival surrendered to the Japanese forces, bringing an end to the seven-day battle. The defeat was described by Winston Churchill as the "worst disaster" in British military history, and is ultimately the largest surrender in British military history.

=== Japanese-occupied Singapore ===
Singapore became known as Syonan-to (昭南島 Shōnan-tō), which translates into English as "Light of the South". Throughout the three and a half years of occupation by the Empire of Japan, Singapore, as well as many of the empire's other colonies, were subjected to multiple war crimes. Shortly after arriving in Singapore, the Japanese Kempeitai secret police force began a purge of ethnically-Chinese Singaporeans that were deemed to be threatening to the Japanese Empire. Throughout this two week purge, referred to as Sook Ching, Singaporean men aged between 18 and 50 were subjected to a brief screening process and, if deemed anti-Japanese, were arrested and transported to one of several remote execution sites to be killed. The Japanese attempted to organize a similar purge throughout Malaya, but discarded the screening process and instead engaged in indiscriminate large-scale killings of the ethnically-Chinese residents of Malaya. While Japanese records indicate that the purge resulted in less than 5,000 deaths, Singapore's founder and first prime minister Lee Kuan Yew had estimated a death toll of between 50,000 and 100,000 Singaporean-Chinese men.

While many British and Australian POWs were held in Changi Prison, a number of them were also forced into slavery by the Empire of Japan, sent to work on a number of infrastructure projects throughout Southeast Asia. The Japanese empire also established several comfort women houses in Singapore. The education system emulated those found in other Japanese colonies, in which all students were forced to learn Japanese and discouraged from using their native language.

A new currency was introduced, popularly referred to as banana money. This currency was quickly subjected to major inflation, as Japanese officials would print more whenever they needed it and it was also easily counterfeited. All Singaporeans were subject to food rations, and ration cards were distributed for citizens to redeem on a monthly basis. As food availability decreased, Singaporeans were encouraged to grow their own food in their gardens.

While there were a number of guerrilla attacks on the Japanese, and the United States periodically bombed Japanese bases, the occupation did not end until Japan's military surrender at the end of World War II. The interim period between Japanese occupation and re-establishment of British occupation was marked by major criminal activity and revenge-killings against the Japanese.

== Establishment of relations and economic relationship ==
Japan and Singapore had little interaction following the occupation. In 1959, a request for reparations was submitted to the Japanese government, but Japan refused them on the grounds that Singapore was still a crown colony of Britain, and they had already paid reparations to Britain in 1951. Singapore existed as a crown colony of the United Kingdom until 1963, during which they merged to become a state of Malaysia. However, following major political disagreements and racial disputes, the Malaysian government unanimously voted to expel Singapore from the union, resulting in Singapore's complete independence on 9 August 1965.

In 1963 the Singapore Chinese Chamber of Commerce called for reparations amounting to S$50 million. In October 1966, Japanese Foreign Minister Etsusaburo Shiina visited Singapore, and agreed with Singapore's Foreign Minister S. Rajaratnam to undertake negotiations on reparations. On 21 September 1967 an agreement was signed under which Japan would gift S$25 million to Singapore, and loan an additional S$25 million. However, Japan did not offer an official apology for war crimes committed during the occupation. However, Japan did see the potential for Singapore and became their largest trading partner, as well as their largest overseas investor. In 1980, the Singapore Government initiated a campaign to learn from Japan in terms of corporate management, labour practices and public security. Company labour unions and koban, or neighbourhood police posts, were introduced to Singapore and became institutionalised.

Japan's private sector was instrumental in the economic development of Singapore during its early years, with the Japanese corporations Seiko establishing a major manufacturing hub, and Sumitomo Chemical Corporation establishing Singapore's first-ever petrochemical plant. The Japan Productivity Center also advised Singapore on how to improve their own productivity.

A major milestone in relations occurred in 2002 with the signing of the Japan-Singapore Economic Partnership Agreement (JSEPA) (Japanese: 日本シンガポール新時代経済連携協定 Nihon Shingapōru shin jidai keizai renkei kyōtei). This document served as Japan's first economic partnership agreement with another country. It enabled easier freedom of movement of people, goods, services, capital, information, etc. across the border between the two countries, and to strengthen cooperation in economic activities.

It also eliminated all tariffs on exports from Japan to Singapore. Tariffs on imports from Singapore to Japan was also abolished, excluding agricultural products and leather products.

The Japanese and Singaporean Governments had visited each other on multiple occasions. Both Japan and Singapore are members of the East Asia Summit, Asia-Pacific Economic Cooperation (APEC), ASEAN+3 (APT) and the World Trade Organization (WTO).

Today, the two nations are each other's largest Asian investors.

By 2015, more than 25,000 Japanese lived in Singapore, typically employed by the 1,100 Japanese companies that had operations there or are permanent residents.

== Resident diplomatic missions ==
of Japan in Singapore

- Singapore (Embassy)

of Singapore in Japan

- Tokyo (Embassy)

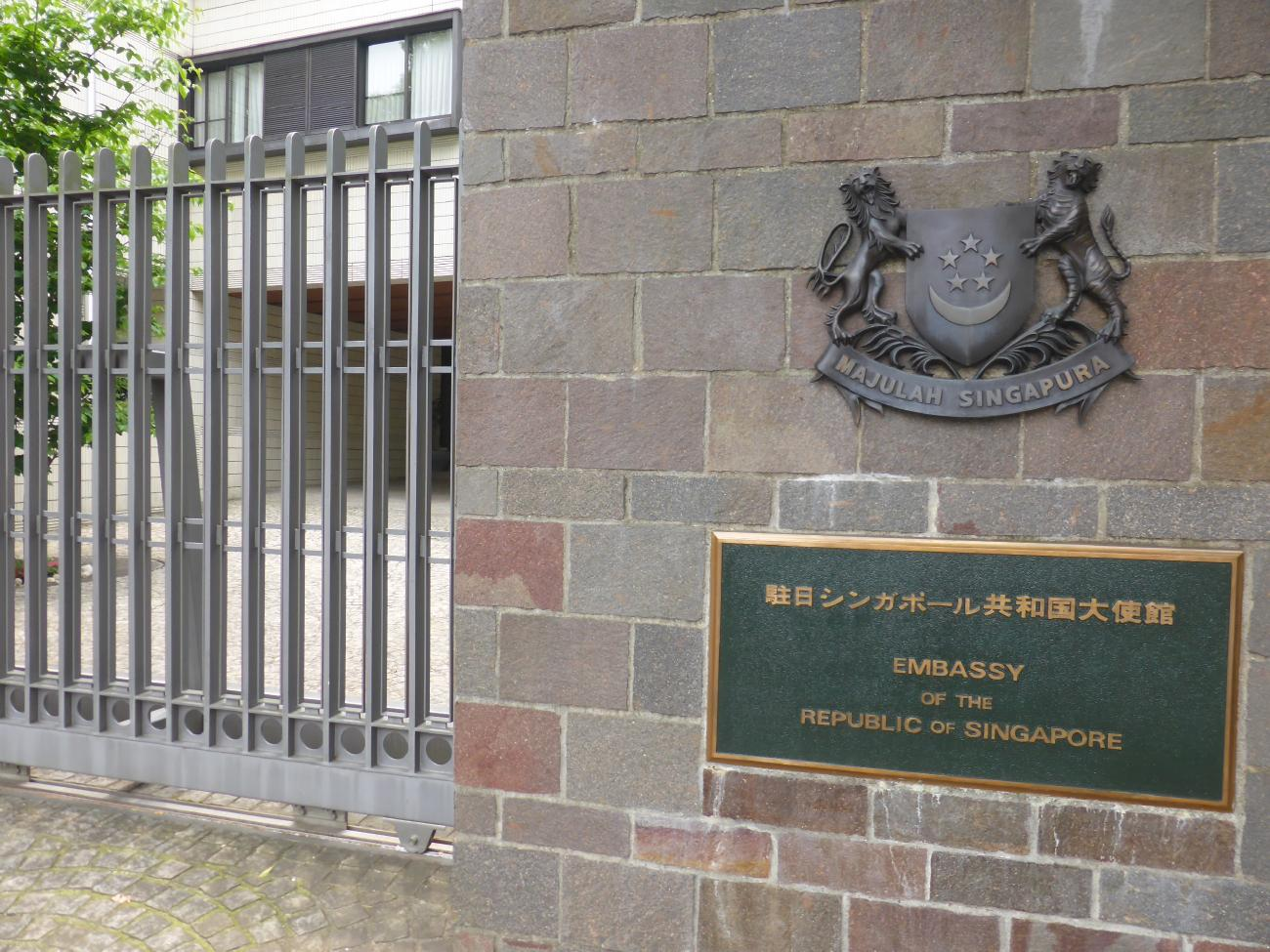
Embassy of Singapore in Tokyo

== Ambassadors ==
Singaporean Ambassadors to Japan

- Dr. Ang Kok Peng (June 1968 to April 1971)
- Dr. Loy Keng Foo (August 1971 to September 1972)
- Wee Mon Cheng (June 1973 to August 1980)
- Wee Kim Wee (September 1980 to April 1984)
- Lee Khoon Choy (June 1984 to July 1988)
- Cheng Tong Fatt (July 1988 to June 1991)
- Lim Chin Beng (July 1991 to November 1997)
- Chew Tai Soo (February 1998 to July 2004)
- Tan Chin Tiong (October 2004 to January 2012)
- Chin Siat Yoon (April 2012 to June 2017)
- Lui Tuck Yew (June 2017 to September 2019)
- Peter Tan Hai Chuan (September 2019 to May 2023)
- Ong Eng Chuan (May 2023 to present)

Consul Generals to Singapore

- Ken Ninomiya (October 1952 to November 1957)
- Seizou Hinata (November 1957 to October 1960)
- Kensaku Maeda (October 1960 to May 1963)
- Hiroto Tanaka (May 1963 to March 1964)
- Tsunemitsu Ueda (March 1964 to April 1966)

The Consulate-General was upgraded to an embassy in 1966.

Japanese Ambassadors to Singapore

- Tsunemitsu Ueda (April 1966 to November 1967)
- Kenichiro Yoshida (November 1967 to September 1969)
- Yasuhiko Nara (September 1969 to October 1972)
- Tokichiro Uomoto (October 1972 to September 1975)
- Shinsuke Hori (September 1975 to February 1978)
- Kiyoaki Kikuchi (February 1978 to March 1980)
- Toshijiro Nakajima (March 1980 to October 1982)
- Hiroshi Fukada (October 1982 to August 1984)
- Hiroshi Hashimoto (August 1984 to March 1987)
- Wasuke Miyake (March 1987 to June 1989)
- Tatsuo Yamaguchi (June 1989 to July 1992)
- Takehiro Togo (July 1992 to November 1993)
- Tomoya Kawamura (November 1993 to February 1996)
- Katsushisa Uchida (February 1996 to March 1998)
- Hiroshi Hashimoto (March 1998 to March 2001)
- Toshiyuki Takano (March 2001 to October 2001)
- Kunihiko Makita (October 2001 to August 2004)
- Kojima Taka-aki (August 2004 to October 2007)
- Makoto Yamanaka (October 2007 to October 2010)
- Yoichi Suzuki (October 2010 to October 2013)
- Haruhisa Takeuchi (October 2013 to April 2016)
- Kenji Shinoda (April 2016 to October 2018)
- Jun Yamazaki (October 2018 to present)

== Cultural relationship ==
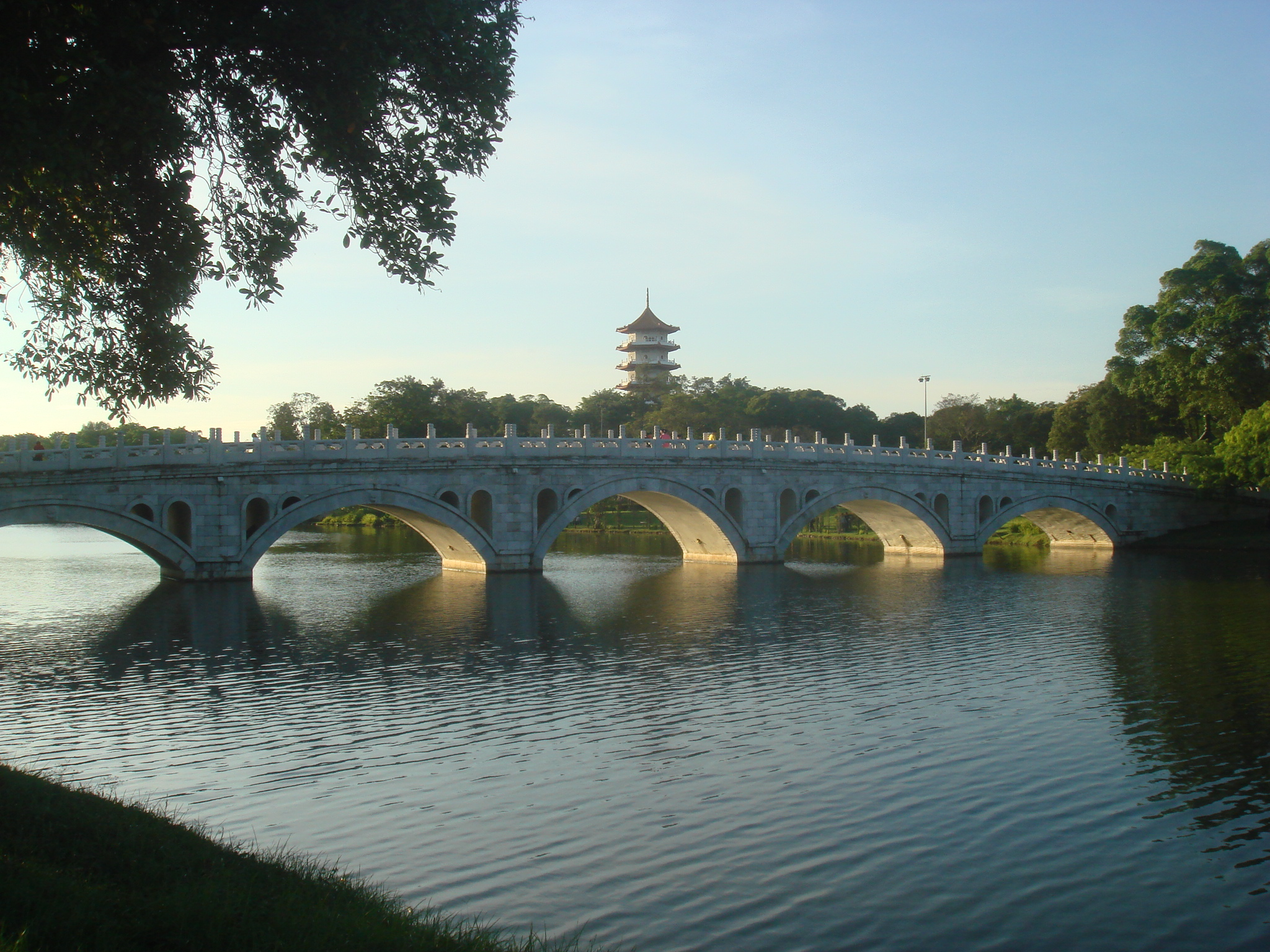
Japanese Garden Bridge

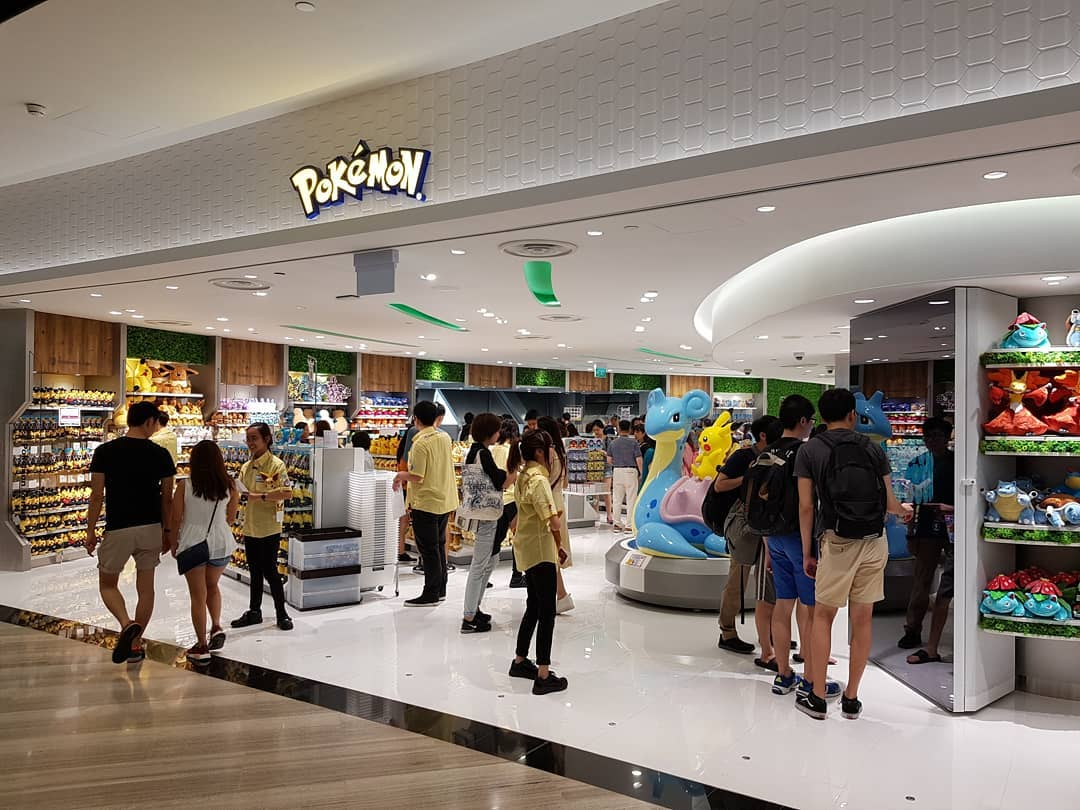
Pokémon Centre Singapore

Japan and Singapore have benefited from a positive relationship over the past few decades. Many aspects of Japan's culture, including their food and media, became popular throughout the 1980s and 1990s throughout Singapore. Over the turn of the millennium, Singaporean culture has also been making inroads in Japan, such as its cultural norms and multicultural cuisines.

Located in Jurong East, Singapore, the Jurong Japanese Garden (Japanese: 星和園ジュロン日本庭園 Seiwa-en Juron Nihon teien) is a park opened in 1974 that was designed to recreate the Muromachi period of 1392 to 1568 and the Azuchi–Momoyama period of 1568 to 1615.

A 2014 study found that approximately 44 percent of Singapore regards the country's relationship with Japan as "very friendly", while 53 percent of Singaporeans believe that Japan can be trusted, though "with some reservations".

Japan and Singapore celebrated 50 years of relations in 2016 dubbed SJ50 with a host of Japanese cultural events held a year-long in Singapore.

Albirex Niigata Singapore FC (Japanese: アルビレックス新潟シンガポール Arubirekkusu Nīgata Shingapōru) is a football club which plays in the Singapore Premier League. The club is a satellite team of Albirex Niigata of Japan, and its players come from Japan with some Singapore players.

Don Quijote (Japanese: 株式会社ドン・キホーテ Kabushiki gaisha Don Kihōte), a discount store widely known in Japan, opened its first ever outlet outside of Japan in Singapore in 2017. As of 2021, it currently has 11 stores in the city-state, the highest amount of stores outside of Japan. The founder of Don Quijote also lives in Singapore, specifically at Sentosa.

The first official permanent Pokémon Center (Japanese: ポケモンセンター Pokemonsentā) outside of Japan opened in Singapore on 11 April 2019, specifically at Jewel Changi Airport. It was the only permanent Pokémon Center outside of Japan for more than four years, until a second one opened in Taipei on 8 December 2023.

Aspects of Singaporean cuisine has also popped up in various locations around Japan with much fanfare. Singaporean coffeehouse chain Ya Kun Kaya Toast opened its first outlet in Japan in the 2010s but was closed after a few years. It reopened a new outlet in Shinjuku in 2020. Bee Cheng Hiang, a Singaporean company famous for its bakkwa, opened its first Japanese outlet in Ginza on 23 September 2016.

The style of community policing is similar in both Japan and Singapore, due to Singapore's adaption of Japanese policing system of kōban to Singapore's neighbourhood police posts.

== Culture and Media ==
=== Music ===
Japanese artists such as Perfume, Kyary Pamyu Pamyu, Official Hige Dandism, Sakura Gakuin, Babymetal, AKB48 and Aimyon, are popular in Singapore. Many Japanese artists tend to tour Singapore due to their highly enthusiastic market for J-pop. Singaporean artists such as Olivia Ong have achieved much success in the large Japanese market, having moved to Tokyo at an early age and forming J-pop group Mirai while being signed to Japanese–Singaporean recording company S2S Pte Ltd.

Amuse, Inc., a Japanese entertainment company that provides artist management services to many J-pop artists in Japan, has a subsidiary office in Singapore.

=== Anime ===
One of the many annual conventions featuring Japanese pop culture is Anime Festival Asia (Japanese: アニメフェスティバルアジア Anime Fesutibaru Ajia), which is held annually at Singapore's Suntec Convention and Exhibition Centre.

== Transportation ==
=== Air ===
There are dozens of direct flights daily between Japan and Singapore with the following airlines: Singapore Airlines, Scoot, All Nippon Airways and Japan Airlines. Singapore Changi Airport is also a focus city for All Nippon Airways. Singapore Airlines and All Nippon Airways have a codeshare agreement with each other. Singapore Airlines, All Nippon Airways and Japan Airlines are rated as 5-star airlines by Skytrax. As of 2019, Singapore Changi Airport was ranked the best airport in the world by Skytrax, with Tokyo Haneda Airport, Chubu Centrair International Airport, and Narita International Airport coming in second, sixth and ninth respectively.

Airlines	Destinations
All Nippon Airways	Singapore, Tokyo–Haneda, Tokyo–Narita
Japan Airlines	Singapore, Tokyo–Haneda, Tokyo–Narita
Singapore Airlines	Singapore, Fukuoka, Nagoya–Centrair, Osaka–Kansai, Sapporo–Chitose, Tokyo–Haneda, Tokyo–Narita
Scoot	Singapore, Osaka–Kansai, Sapporo–Chitose, Okinawa

=== Rail ===
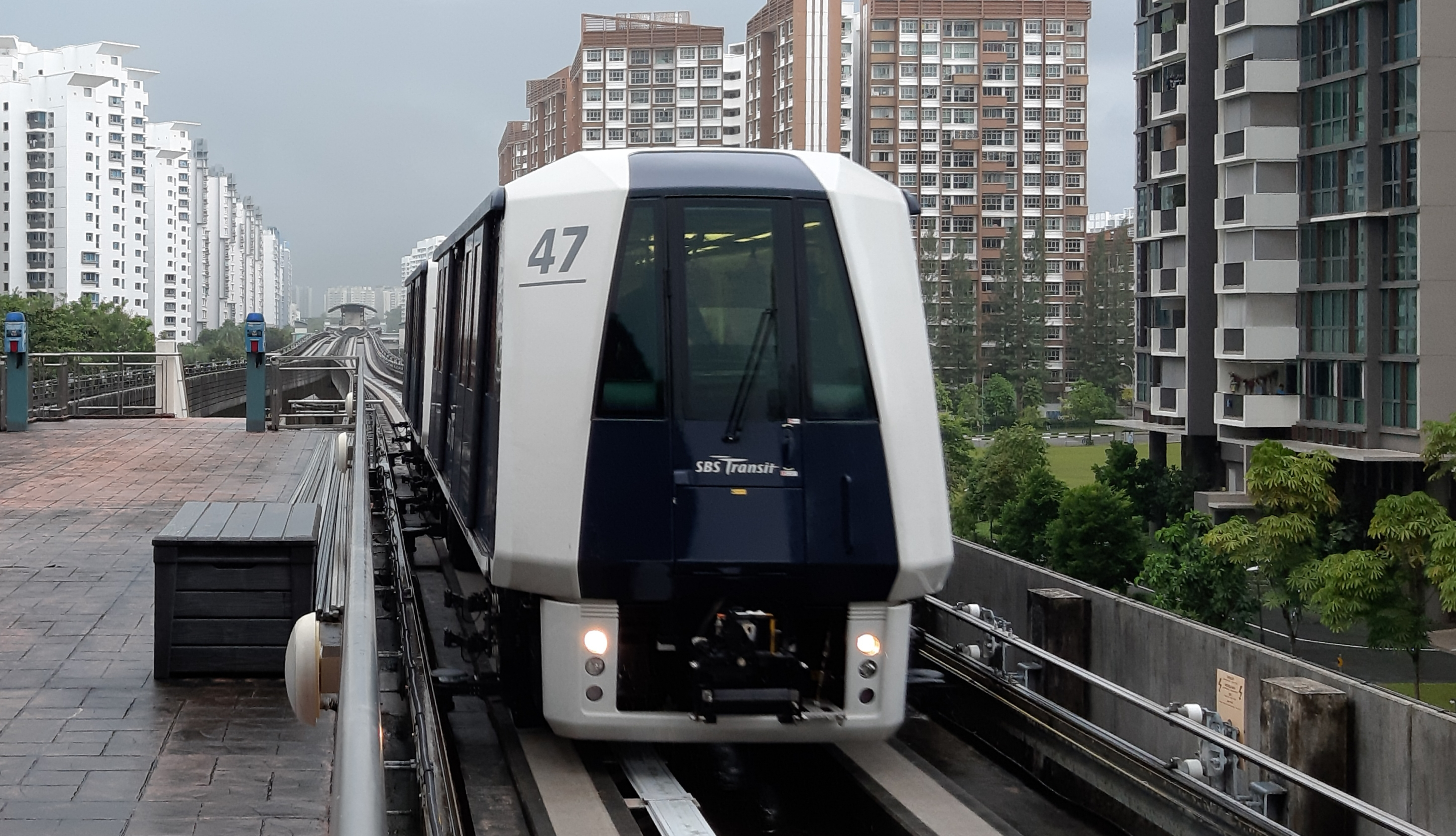
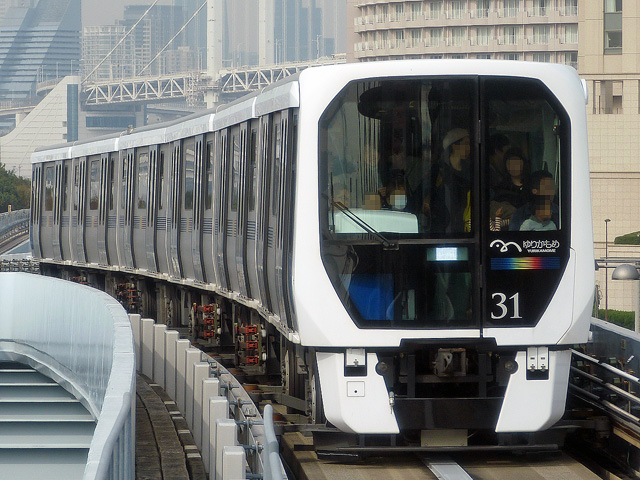
Both the Singapore LRT C810A (left) and the Yurikamome 7300 series (right) are built by Mitsubishi Heavy Industries and use the same guideway technology.

The initial Mass Rapid Transit (MRT) network in Singapore had heavy Japanese involvement in its construction, with 11 out of 30 civil contracts in the initial MRT construction being awarded local joint ventures with the Japanese firms. Many Japanese construction firms have since played a key role in the construction of subsequent MRT lines with examples including Taisei Corporation, Penta-Ocean, Nishimatsu and Tekken Corporation.

Japanese rolling stock companies such as Kawasaki Heavy Industries and Mitsubishi Heavy Industries have also been involved in supplying trains for the Singapore MRT. In particular, Kawasaki supplied 66 six-car MRT trains together with Nippon Sharyo, Tokyu Car Corp and Kinki Sharyo as part from 1986 to 1989 for the initial MRT network and later on, 21 additional trains with Nippon Sharyo from 1999 to 2001 to add capacity to the network. The New Transportation System, a medium-capacity rubber-tyred automated guideway transit solution that has seen applications in systems such as Tokyo's Yurikamome and Kobe's Port Island Line, has also seen use in Singapore on both urban applications such as the Sengkang and Punggol LRT and airport people mover systems such as the Changi Airport Skytrain as the Mitsubishi Crystal Mover.

In 2013, JR East, a major railway operator in eastern Japan and Greater Tokyo, opened an office in Singapore to establish its presence in Asia for future railway projects in the region and as part of a bid for the Kuala Lumpur–Singapore high-speed rail project. In 2016, JR East also opened the first Japan Rail Cafe outside of Japan at Tanjong Pagar Centre (Guoco Tower) to promote rail travel in Japan in the region.

== Tourism ==
In 2018, 829,664 Japanese tourists visited Singapore, while 437,280 Singaporean tourists visited Japan.

Japan allows visa-free access to Singapore for up to 90 days, with possible extension for up to 6 months. Singapore has reciprocated, allowing Japanese visa-free access for up to 30 days. From 2018 to 2021, the Singaporean and Japanese passports have maintained their positions as the world's two most powerful passports.

In addition to Singapore's official languages, Singaporean directional signs at various tourist attractions and Singapore Changi Airport include the Japanese language. A likely reason for this is the high percentage of Japanese tourists. For every year from 1978 to 2000, at least 10% of the tourists that entered Singapore are from Japan.

== Education ==
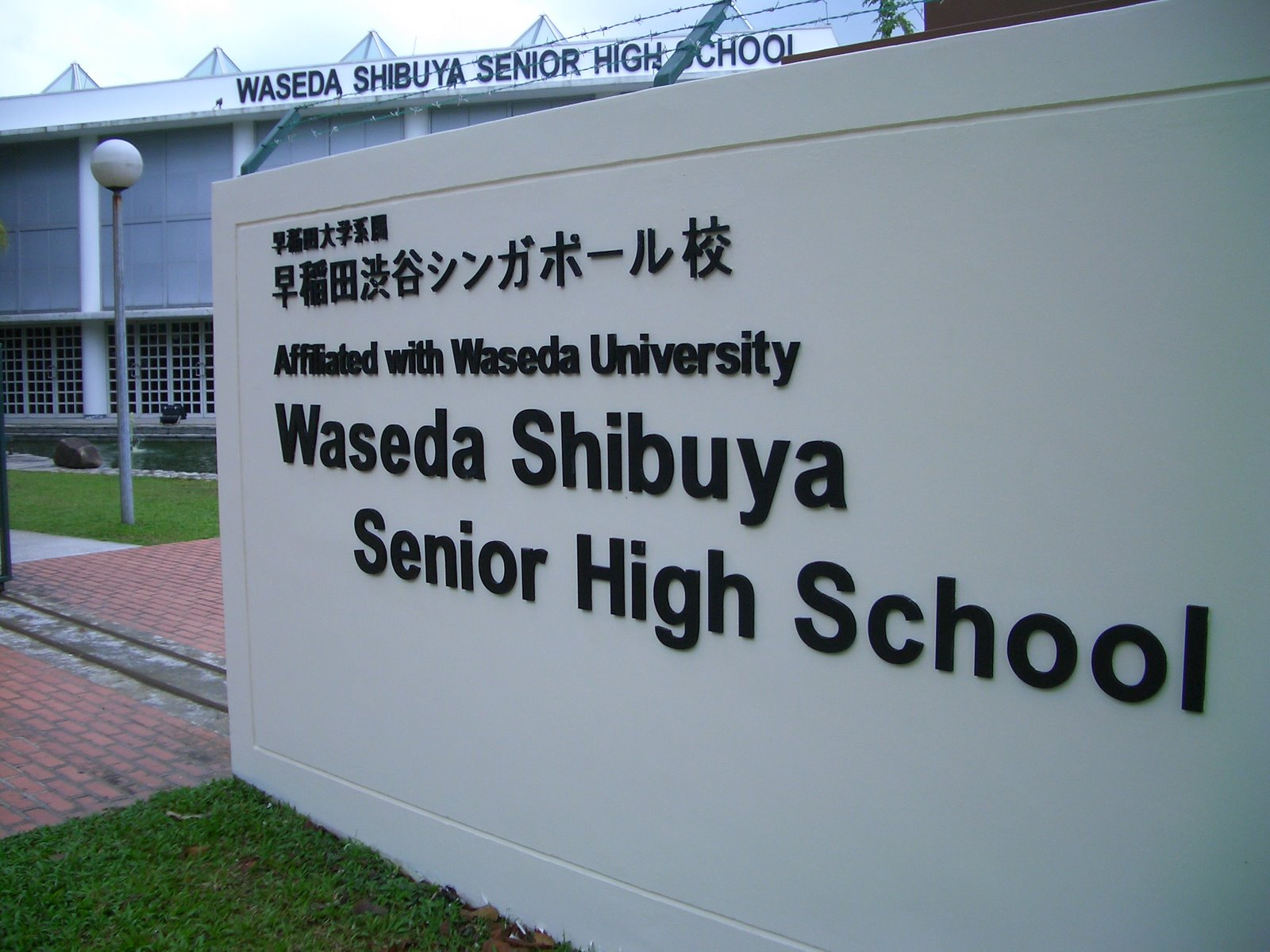
Waseda Shibuya Senior High School in Singapore

Educationally, the Japanese people living in Singapore (Japanese: 在シンガポール日本人 Zai Shingapōru Nihonjin) are served by a number of Japanese-medium educational institutions, including a 400-student kindergarten, a 1,900-student primary school, a 700-student junior high school, and a 500-student senior high school, as well as twelve juku (cram schools) to prepare them for university entrance exams. The schools are situated near Japanese neighbourhoods, and all of the student body and staff are Japanese nationals. Only a small minority of Japanese families send their children to non-Japanese international schools.

The Japanese School Singapore (Japanese: シンガポール日本人学校 Shingapōru Nihonjin Gakkō) serves elementary and junior high students and the Waseda Shibuya Senior High School in Singapore (Japanese: 早稲田大学系属早稲田渋谷シンガポール校 Waseda Shibuya Shingapōru Kō) (formerly Shibuya Makuhari Singapore School) serves high school students. Both schools hold annual festivals open to members of the public who are interested in Japanese culture.

The Japanese Supplementary School Singapore (JSS; シンガポール日本語補習授業校 Shingapōru Nihongo Hoshū Jugyō Kō), a supplementary programme, also operates in Singapore.

== See also ==
- Foreign relations of Japan
- Foreign relations of Singapore
- Japanese people in Singapore
