= Zenpukuji Park =

Park in Suginami Ward, Tokyo, Japan

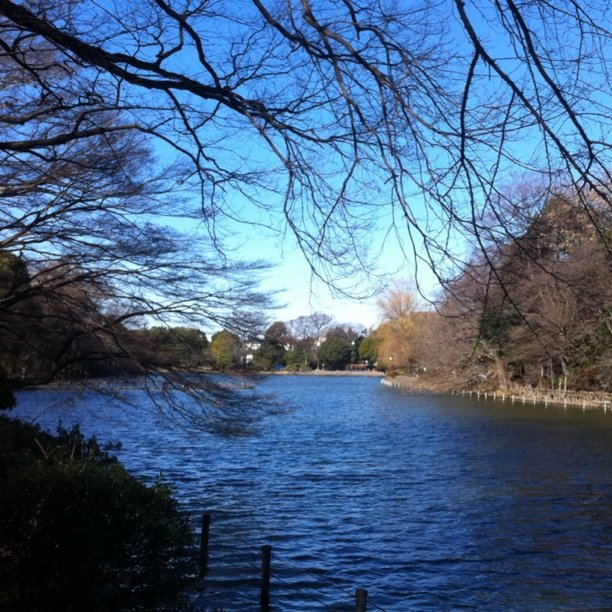
- Zenpukuji Pond

- Location within Special wards of Tokyo
- Location: Suginami Ward, Tokyo, Japan
- Coordinates: 35°42′53.3″N 139°35′27.7″E
- Area: 80,264.47 m^{2} (863,959.6 sq ft)
- Created: June 16, 1961
- Public transit: Nishi-Ogikubo Station, Kami-Shakujii Station

Zenpukuji Park (善福寺公園, Zenpukuji-kōen) is a metropolitan park located in Suginami Ward, Tokyo, under the jurisdiction of the Tokyo Metropolitan Government Bureau of Construction. Zenpukuji Pond is the source of Zenpukuji River.

== Etymology ==
The park is names after the pond, which derives its current name from a temple that once stood along its shores. However, this original Zenpukuji temple was abandoned during the Edo period. Today, there is a new temple called Zenpukuji in the vicinity, but this is a different institution entirely. Originally named Fukujuan, this temple was later renamed to reflect the local place name, leading to potential confusion about the pond's true namesake.

== Zenpukuji Pond ==
Zenpukuji Pond is divided in two ponds, upper and lower. The pond has served as a natural spring-fed water source on the Musashino Plateau since ancient times. During the Edo period, when the surrounding area remained a rural farming community, this pond provided essential water for local residents. The pond was originally known as Osonoi Pond, and the nearby village of Kami-Igusa was correspondingly called Osonoi Village (遅野井村). It is the source of Zenpukuji River.

It is a cherry blossom spot, and visitors can rent rowboats and pedal boats from mid-March until early November.

== Osonoi Falls ==
Within the park stands Osonoi Falls, fed by one of Zenpukuji Pond's springs. According to local legend, the falls originated in 1189 when Minamoto no Yoritomo, on his way to his conquest of Oshu, stopped here seeking drinking water. Finding the area suffering from drought, he used the notch of his bow to dig in seven locations. After a patient wait, water eventually bubbled up from all seven spots. The name Osonoi (遅の井), which means late well is said to come from Yoritomo's words expressing his impatience: It's too late now (今や遅し). While the original well has since dried up, modern conservation efforts have dug the wellhead and added a pumping system, allowing Osonoi Falls to continue flowing with groundwater for contemporary visitors to enjoy.

== See also ==
- Parks and gardens in Tokyo
- National Parks of Japan
