= Typhoon Noul (2015) =

Pacific typhoon in 2015

Typhoon Noul (Dodong)
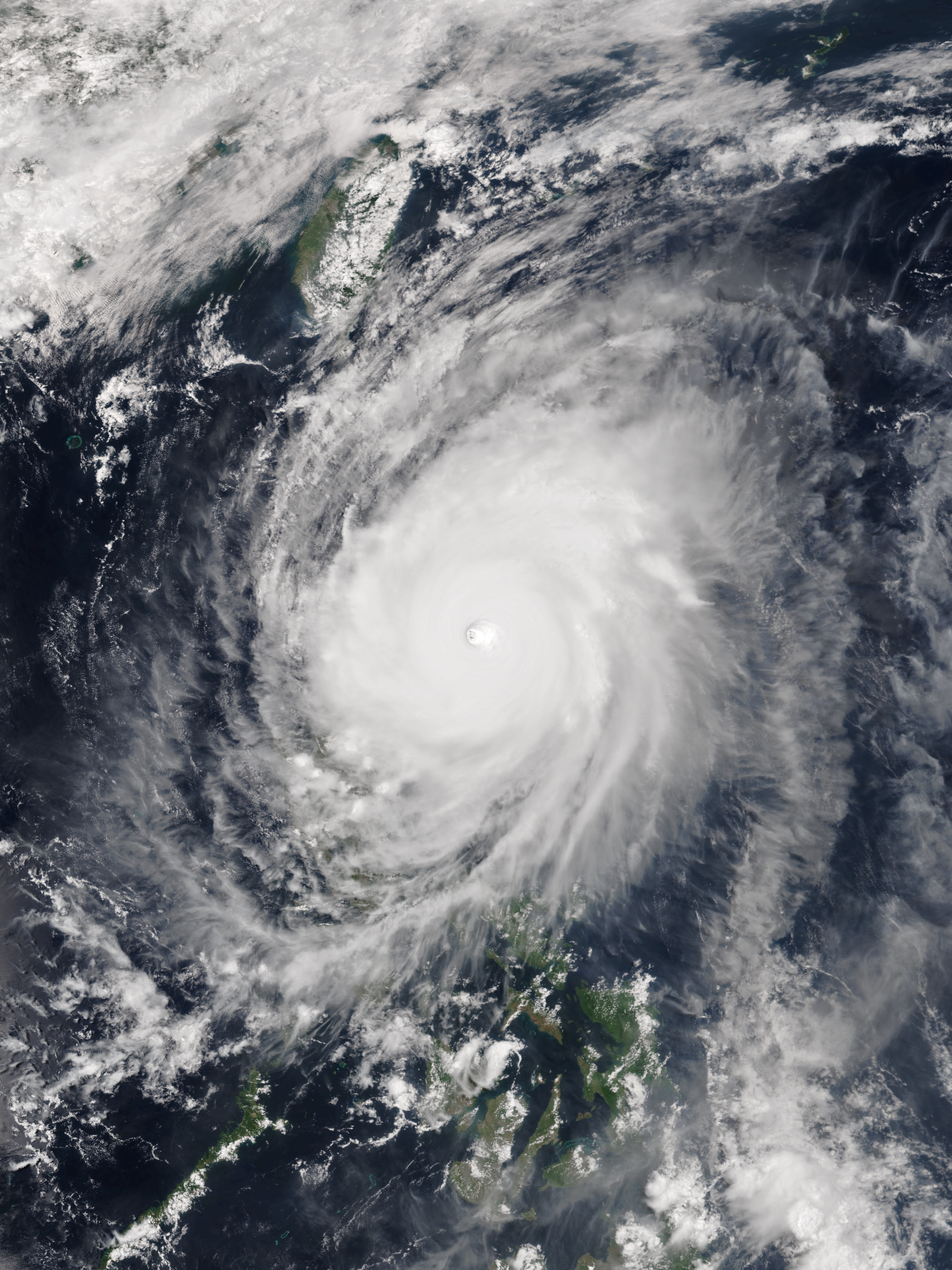
- Noul at peak intensity shortly before landfall on May 10

Meteorological history
- Formed: May 2, 2015
- Extratropical: May 12, 2015
- Dissipated: May 16, 2015

Violent typhoon
- 10-minute sustained (JMA)
- Highest winds: 205 km/h (125 mph)
- Lowest pressure: 920 hPa (mbar); 27.17 inHg

Category 5-equivalent super typhoon
- 1-minute sustained (SSHWS/JTWC)
- Highest winds: 260 km/h (160 mph)
- Lowest pressure: 918 hPa (mbar); 27.11 inHg

Overall effects
- Fatalities: 2 indirect
- Damage: $23.8 million (2015 USD)
- Areas affected: Caroline Islands, Philippines, Taiwan, Japan
- IBTrACS
- Part of the 2015 Pacific typhoon season

Typhoon Noul, known in the Philippines as Super Typhoon Dodong, was a relatively small but powerful tropical cyclone that affected several areas but caused minor damage in early May 2015. The sixth named storm and third typhoon of the annual typhoon season, Noul formed as a tropical depression over the eastern Caroline Islands on May 2, 2015. It moved generally to the west and west-northwest, gradually intensifying into a tropical storm and later typhoon. On May 9, Noul began rapid deepening as it developed a well-defined eye. Early the next day, the Japan Meteorological Agency (JMA) estimated peak 10 minute sustained winds of 205 km/h (125 mph), while the American-based Joint Typhoon Warning Center (JTWC) estimated peak 1 minute winds of 260 km/h (160 mph), equivalent to Category 5 on the Saffir–Simpson hurricane wind scale. Noul struck northeastern Luzon in the Philippines at that intensity and greatly weakened. After passing east of Taiwan, the typhoon accelerated to the northeast and weakened due to unfavorable conditions. On May 12, Noul became extratropical south of Japan, and the remnants continued to the northeast for several days, dissipating on May 16.

The typhoon first affected Yap State in the Federated States of Micronesia, bringing 296 mm (11.65 in) of rainfall and causing about US$100,000 in damage. Noul forced 3,803 people to evacuate in the Philippines and stranded thousands others due to travel cancellations. Two people died while preparing for the storm. Its effects were limited to two provinces, amounting to ₱16.3 million (US$366,000) in damage. Later, heavy rainfall in Taiwan helped ease water restrictions. The storm caused heavy crop damage in the Miyako District of Okinawa, totaling ¥2.8 billion (US$23.3 million).

== Meteorological history ==
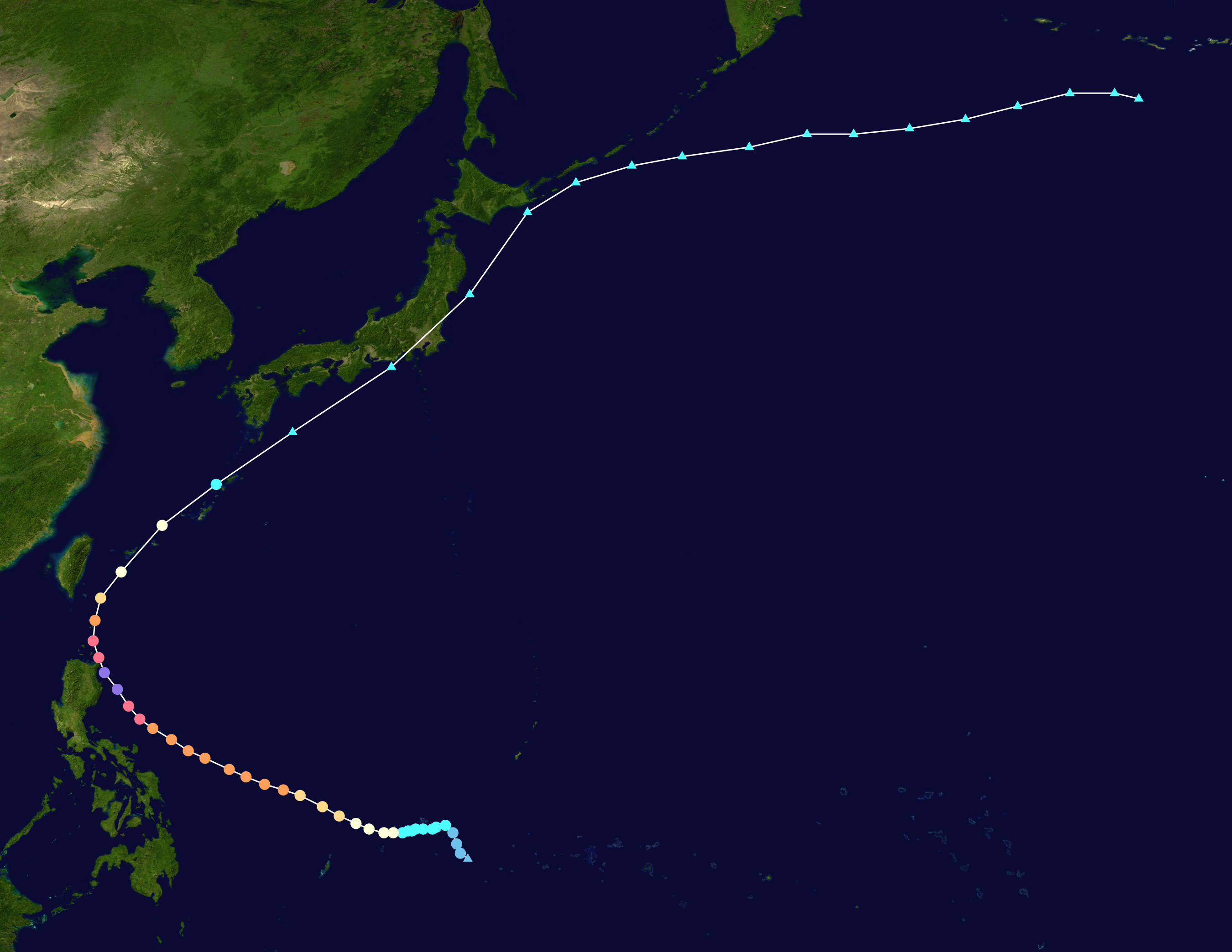
Map plotting the storm's track and intensity, according to the Saffir–Simpson scale Map key Saffir–Simpson scale Tropical depression (≤38 mph, ≤62 km/h) Tropical storm (39–73 mph, 63–118 km/h) Category 1 (74–95 mph, 119–153 km/h) Category 2 (96–110 mph, 154–177 km/h) Category 3 (111–129 mph, 178–208 km/h) Category 4 (130–156 mph, 209–251 km/h) Category 5 (≥157 mph, ≥252 km/h) Unknown Storm type Tropical cyclone Subtropical cyclone Extratropical cyclone, remnant low, tropical disturbance, or monsoon depression

The origins of Noul were related to a strong westerly wind burst that also led to the formation of later Typhoon Dolphin. By April 30, 2015, an area of convection, or thunderstorms, persisted and pulsed about 230 km (140 mi) west-southwest of Chuuk State within the Federated States of Micronesia (FSM). The system had a broad circulation amid an environment favorable for tropical cyclogenesis, including low to moderate wind shear. The circulation slowly consolidated, developing improved outflow and increasingly organized convection. At 06:00 UTC on May 2, the Japan Meteorological Agency (JMA) designated the system as a tropical depression about 850 km (530 mi) west-southwest of Chuuk. At 00:00 UTC the next day, the Joint Typhoon Warning Center (JTWC) classified the system as Tropical Depression 06W.

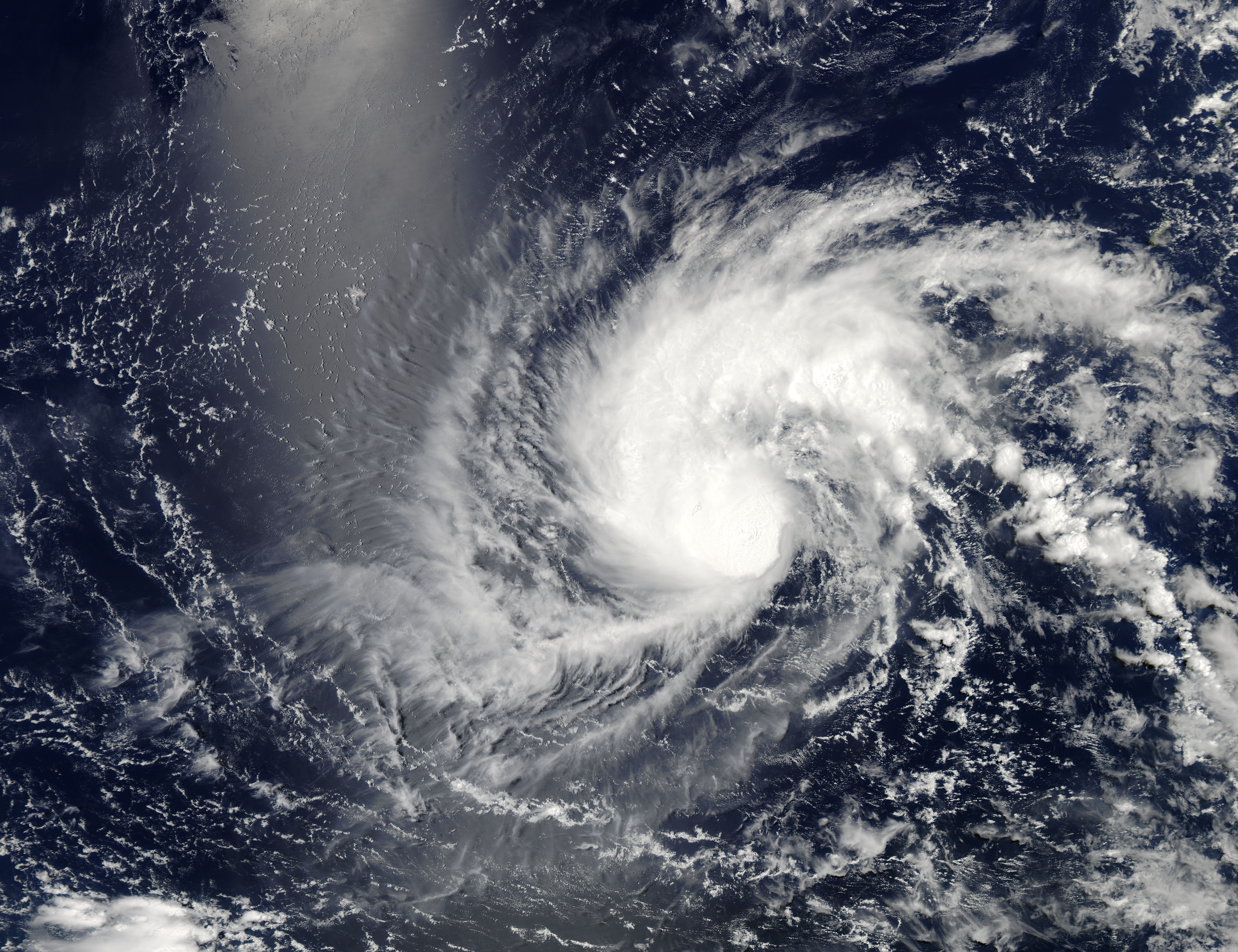
Tropical Storm Noul near Yap on May 5

The nascent tropical cyclone moved northwestward through a weakness in the subtropical ridge. Aided by decreasing wind shear and warm sea surface temperatures, the convection organized into a central dense overcast. At 18:00 UTC on May 3, the JMA upgraded the depression to a tropical storm named Noul. (Note: The name Noul (Korean: 노을, [no̞ɯɭ]) was contributed by North Korea and refers to the glow of sunrise or sunset in Korean.) The strengthening ridge turned the storm to the west toward the Philippines. On May 5, an eye developed in the center of the storm while Noul was near Yap State, prompting the JTWC to upgrade the storm to typhoon status. At 18:00 UTC that day, the JMA upgraded Noul to a severe tropical storm, and later to typhoon status at 06:00 UTC on May 6. The storm's spiral rainbands became increasingly organized, although the eye initially remained cloud-filled. Early on May 7, Noul crossed 135º E into the area of responsibility of PAGASA – the Philippines' weather bureau – who assigned the local name Dodong.

Due to radial outflow, low vertical wind shear, and water temperatures above 30°C, Noul started rapid deepening on May 9 while approaching the Philippine island of Luzon, forming a sharply well-defined 35 km (22 mi) eye embedded in a deepening symmetric core; therefore, the JTWC upgraded it to a super typhoon late on the same day. At 00:00 UTC on May 10, the JMA estimated peak 10 minute sustained winds of 205 km/h (125 mph). At the same time, the JTWC estimated peak 1 minute sustained winds of 260 km/h (160 mph), equivalent to Category 5 on the Saffir–Simpson hurricane wind scale. As the typhoon neared the northeast tip of Luzon, satellite imagery showed rapid deterioration of the storm's core structure and warming of the cloud tops. According to PAGASA Control Room, at around 08:45 UTC on May 10, Noul made landfall in the Philippines at Pananapan Point in Santa Ana, Cagayan. However, the JMA and JTWC tracks do not show landfall, but instead show the center staying offshore. After its closest approach to Luzon, the storm's structure continued to deteriorate, becoming elongated and less organized due to increasing wind shear and land interaction. By late on May 10, the eye largely disappeared from satellite imagery as Noul turned northward over water, steered around the subtropical ridge. A large residual eye persisted in the center of the waning convection, although stronger wind shear increasingly disrupted the storm's structure. An approaching trough steered Noul to the northeast, bringing it east of Taiwan on May 11. By early on May 12, the storm had become increasingly elongated as dry air became entrained in the center, with the structure resembling a "comma"-shape, according to the JTWC. The agency downgraded it to a tropical storm at 00:00 UTC that day as the storm accelerated through Amami Ōshima. Six hours later, the storm became extratropical off the southern coast of Japan.

The extratropical remnants of Noul continued to the northeast. Around 12:00 UTC on May 12, the storm passed through the Kantō region of southeastern Japan. The center quickly moved back over water and passed just east of Hokkaido on May 13. Noul slowed its forward motion while remaining south of the Kuril Islands and Russia's Kamchatka Peninsula. At 06:00 UTC on May 16, the remnants of Noul dissipated near the International Date Line, after being absorbed by another large extratropical storm.

== Preparations and impact ==
=== Federated States of Micronesia ===
Ahead of the storm's arrival, typhoon warnings were issued for Yap State in the Federated States of Micronesia (FSM). In its formative stages, Noul caused minor damage to Fais Island and Ulithi Atoll. On the island of Yap, the typhoon produced gusts to 116 km/h (72 mph) and 296 mm (11.65 in) of rainfall. Damage on the island was estimated at US$100,000. The storm delayed a supply ship to outlying islands of the state that were previously affected by Typhoon Maysak a month prior.

=== Philippines ===
Infrared satellite loop of Typhoon Noul passing near the northeastern tip of Luzon on May 10

Typhoon Noul, known as Typhoon Dodong within the country, entered the Philippine area of Responsibility on May 7. In response to the storm, PAGASA raised warning signal 4, the highest level, for northeastern Cagayan as well as the offshore Batanes and Babuyan Islands. Neighboring provinces had lower warning signals. A total of 3,803 people evacuated their homes in Cagayan and Isabela to 27 storm shelters; families returned home by late on May 10 after the storm moved ashore without causing much damage. Flights and ferry routes were canceled, stranding 10,000 people. The Philippine Army deployed 18 soldiers to assist in storm preparations, utilizing boats and helicopters. Fisherfolk were advised not to go out to sea east of Luzon. People were also evacuated from the vicinity of Mount Bulusan after rains from Noul threatened to cause lahars and mudslides from ash of a recent eruption. They were allowed to return after Noul recurved to the north and the threat did not materialize. Two people in Cagayan died due to electrocution while attempting to fix their roofs ahead of the storm.

Animation of issued PSWS for Typhoon Dodong as it skirts the Philippines

Upon striking the Philippines, the typhoon produced high winds and heavy rainfall to Luzon. Noul knocked down trees and damaged houses, resulting in power outages to seven communities; the power was restored within one day. The storm's rains were beneficial to local farmers after an extended dry spell. In Santa Ana where the storm moved ashore, the storm caused minor damage to seven schools. Across Cagayan, the storm damaged ₱2.7 million (US$61,000) worth of corn and rice crops, as well as minor damage to fisheries. There was minor infrastructure damage in neighboring Ilocos Norte. Overall, Noul caused ₱16.3 million (US$366,000) in damage.

=== Elsewhere ===
In Taiwan, domestic flights from mainland Taiwan to the outlying Green Island and Orchid Island were canceled for May 10. Also in the outlying islands, schools and offices were closed in anticipation of the storm, while boats sought shelter at harbors. Heavy rains from the storm's outer bands and a frontal system brought much needed rain to areas of northern Taiwan suffering from a severe drought. A total of 93 mm (3.7 in) of rain fell at the Shihmen Dam, amounting to an increase of approximately 7 million tonnes of water in the reservoir, and bringing it to 30.5% capacity. Several major cities were able to lift water rationing as a result. Rainfall amounted to 69 mm (2.7 in) at the Baoshan Reservoir, 60.5 mm (2.38 in) at the Mingte Reservoir, and 52.5 mm (2.07 in) at the Feistui Reservoir.

On May 11, Noul impacted the Ryukyu Islands of Japan as a weakening typhoon. The Yaeyama Islands experienced unexpectedly strong winds, with Ishigaki measuring its highest sustained winds during May on record at 104 km/h (65 mph); records there began in 1897. To the east, sustained winds of 131 km/h (81 mph) and gusts to 172 km/h (107 mph) were observed on Shimoji-shima. Across Okinawa, the storm's high winds and waves damaged crops, accounting for ¥2.8 billion (US$23.3 million) in crop damage. Most of the crop damage occurred in the Miyako District, where the storm also caused power outages. On Tokunoshima island, the storm damaged 13 houses and injured six people. The typhoon also caused 47 flights to be canceled, stranding 4,300 people. Noul dropped heavy rainfall across Japan that set daily May records, including 143 mm (5.6 in) on Ishigaki Island. Rainfall also spread into the main islands of Japan, reaching 180 mm (7.1 in) in the Tōkai region. One person in Kyoto sustained significant injuries after falling amid high winds. The storm also delayed oil shipments from Japan's oil refineries.

The remnants of Noul, in conjunction with later Typhoon Dolphin, shifted the broader weather pattern to bring record warmth to Alaska, making the temperatures warmer than that of Washington, D.C.

== See also ==
- Weather of 2015
- Tropical cyclones in 2015
- Typhoon Zeb (1998) – powerful typhoon that took a similar path but was much deadlier
- Typhoon Nida (2004) – another early season powerful typhoon that brushed the Philippines and Japan
- Typhoon Chanthu (2021) – a violent typhoon that skirted through the Northern part of the Philippines
- Severe Tropical Storm Jangmi
