= Jun Yamazaki =

Japanese diplomat (born 1956)

- 山崎潤

Ambassador of Japan to Singapore
- Incumbent
- Assumed office 13 October 2018
- Minister: Toshimitsu Motegi
- Preceded by: Kenji Shinoda

Personal details
- Born: 山崎潤 (Yamazaki Jun); 22 September 1956 (age 70) London, United Kingdom
- Party: Liberal Democratic Party
- Education: The University of Tokyo

Jun Yamazaki (山崎 潤, Yamazaki Jun; born 22 September 1956) is a Japanese diplomat and the current Ambassador of Japan to Singapore. He was formerly a United Nations Assistant Secretary-General at the Office of Programme Planning, Budget and Accounts, and Controller. He was appointed to the position by United Nations Secretary-General Ban Ki-moon in August 2008.

Yamazaki worked the Japanese Ministry of Foreign Affairs for a number of years. He was Counsellor in the Embassy of Japan in Indonesia. He also acted as deputy director in the United Nations Administration Division of the Multilateral Cooperation Department of the Ministry of Foreign Affairs. In this capacity, he was in charge of administrative and budgetary affairs of the United Nations. He later became Director of the International Peace Cooperation Division and Deputy Director-General for Global Issues in the International Cooperation Bureau of the Ministry of Foreign Affairs in Japan and served until August 2008. From 2003 to 2007, he was a member of the United Nations Advisory Committee on Administrative and Budgetary Questions (ACABQ).

Yamazaki obtained his BA degree in international relations from The University of Tokyo.

== Honours ==
- Netherlands: Grand Officer of the Order of Orange-Nassau (29 October 2014)
