= Bakkwa =

Salty-sweet dried meat product

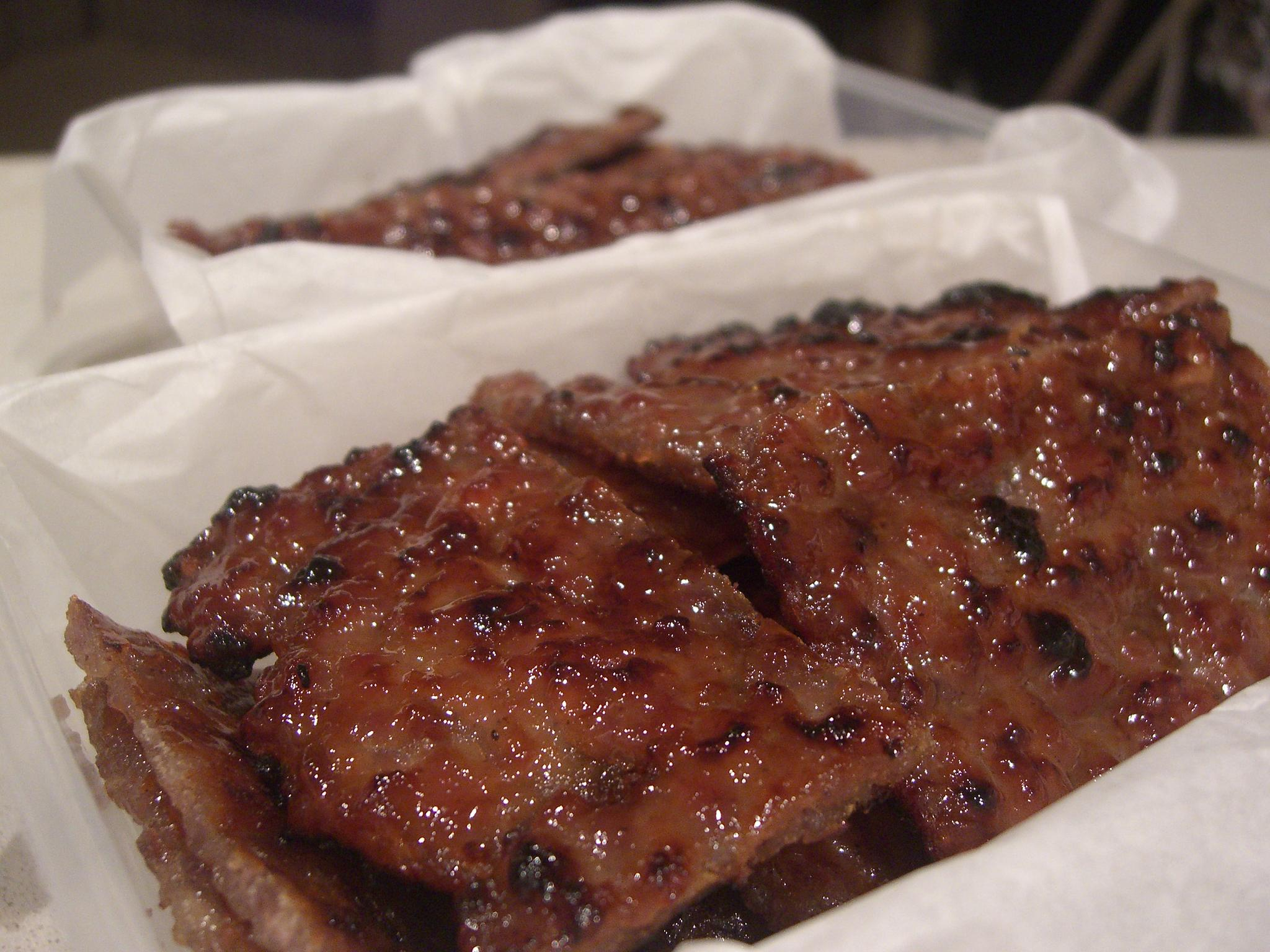
- Chinese bakkwa made from pork
- Alternative names: Rougan
- Place of origin: China
- Region or state: Fujian
- Serving temperature: Hot or cold
- Main ingredients: Dried meat

Bakkwa
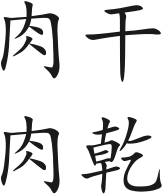
- Bakkwa in Simplified Chinese (top) and Traditional Chinese characters (below)
- Traditional Chinese: 肉乾
- Simplified Chinese: 肉干
- Literal meaning: dried meat
Transcriptions
Standard Mandarin
- Hanyu Pinyin: ròugān
- IPA: [ɻôʊkán]
Yue: Cantonese
- Yale Romanization: yuhk gōn
- Jyutping: juk6 gon1
Southern Min
- Hokkien POJ: bah-koaⁿ
- Tâi-lô: bah-kuann

Bakkwa (simplified Chinese: 肉干; traditional Chinese: 肉乾; Pe̍h-ōe-jī: bah-koaⁿ; pinyin: ròugān) is a Chinese salty-sweet dried meat product similar to jerky.

Bakkwa is made with a meat preservation and preparation technique originating from China. The general method of production has remained virtually unchanged throughout the centuries, but the techniques have been gradually improved. It is traditionally made of pork, beef, or mutton, which is prepared with spices, sugar, salt and soy sauce, then dried on racks at around 50 to 60 °C (122 to 140 °F) to a final water activity between 0.60 and 0.69.

Nowadays, products with a softer texture, lighter color and less sugar are preferred. The shafu type of bakkwa products has a higher water content, and thus has a softer texture and lower sugar content. Whereas the traditional bakkwa has a water activity below 0.7, shafu bakkwa tends to be closer to a water activity of about 0.79. Nevertheless, shafu can have a similar shelf life to other types of bakkwa.

Bakkwa is very popular in Singapore and Malaysia where it is traditionally eaten during the Chinese New Year. When Chinese immigrants brought this delicacy over to Singapore and Malaysia, it began to take on local characteristics. For instance, the meat is grilled over charcoal after air-drying, imparting a smokier flavor. The Singaporean and Malaysian versions of bakkwa are also sweeter than their mainland China counterparts with many different variations having developed to suit local palates, such as chili bakkwa.

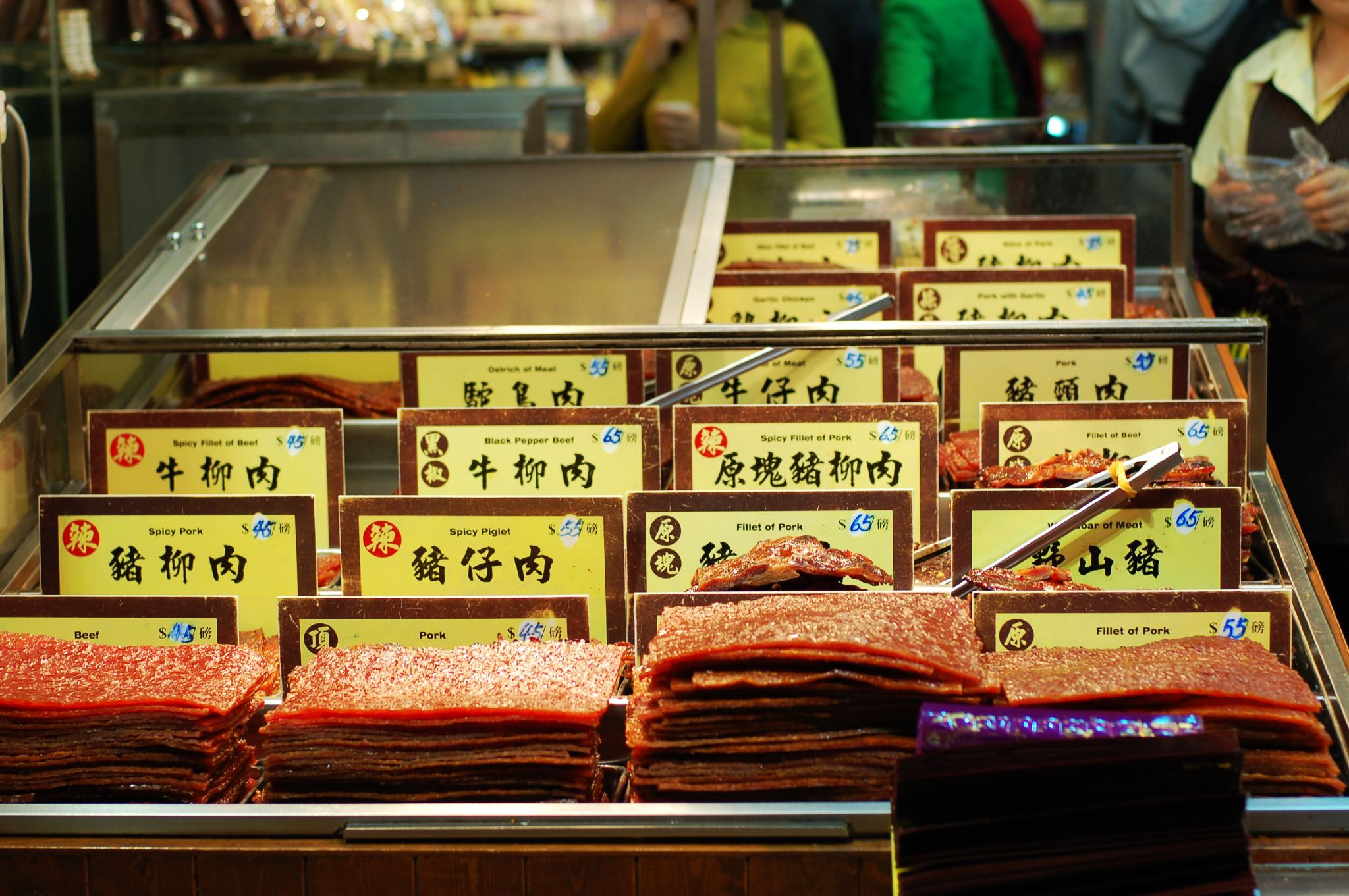
Different kinds of bakkwa on display, Hong Kong

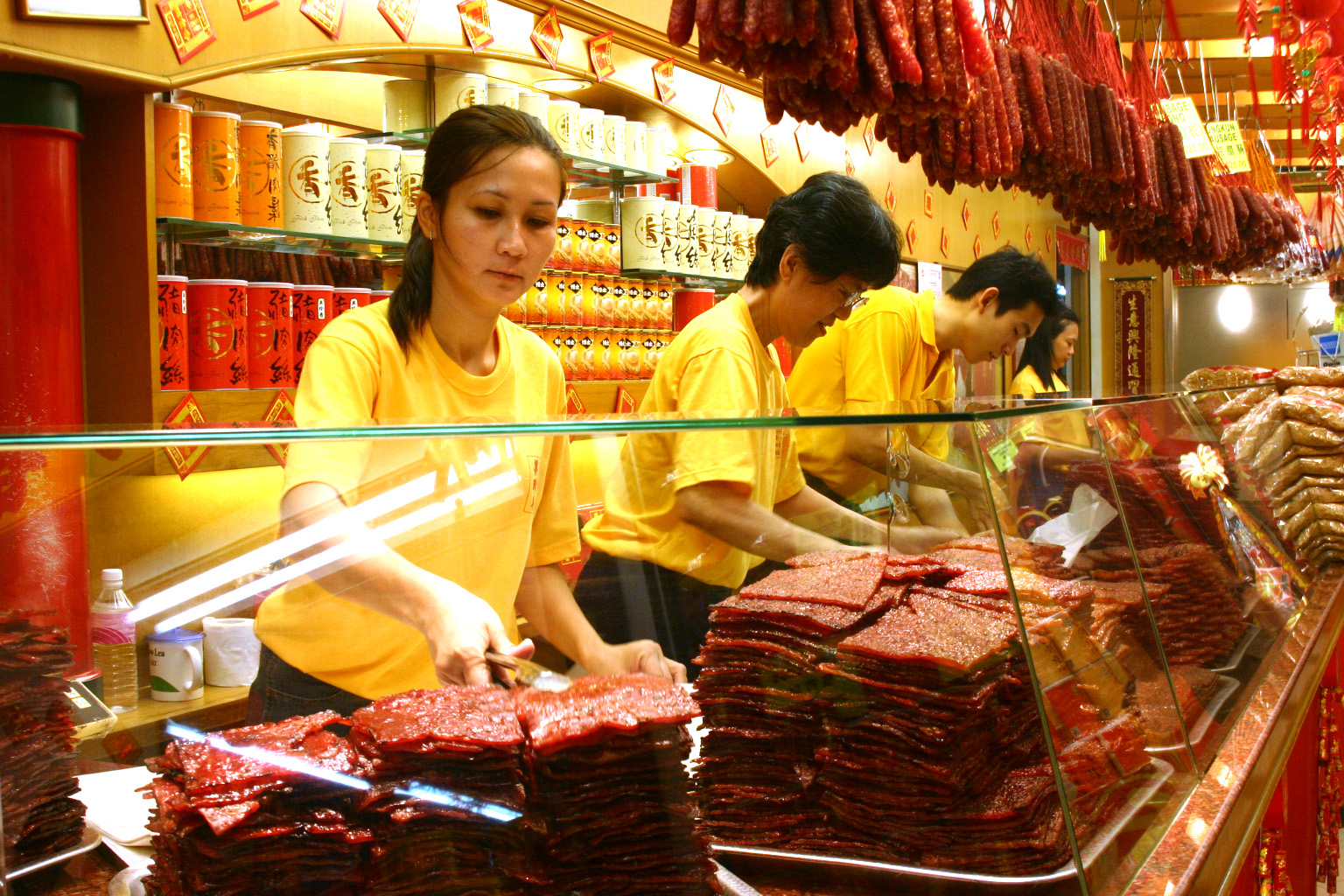
Bakkwa at a Bee Cheng Hiang shop in Singapore

== See also ==
- Bee Cheng Hiang
- Dendeng
- Dried shredded squid
- Rousong
