= Zenpukuji River =

River in Tokyo, Japan

Coordinates: 35°41′17″N 139°39′48″E

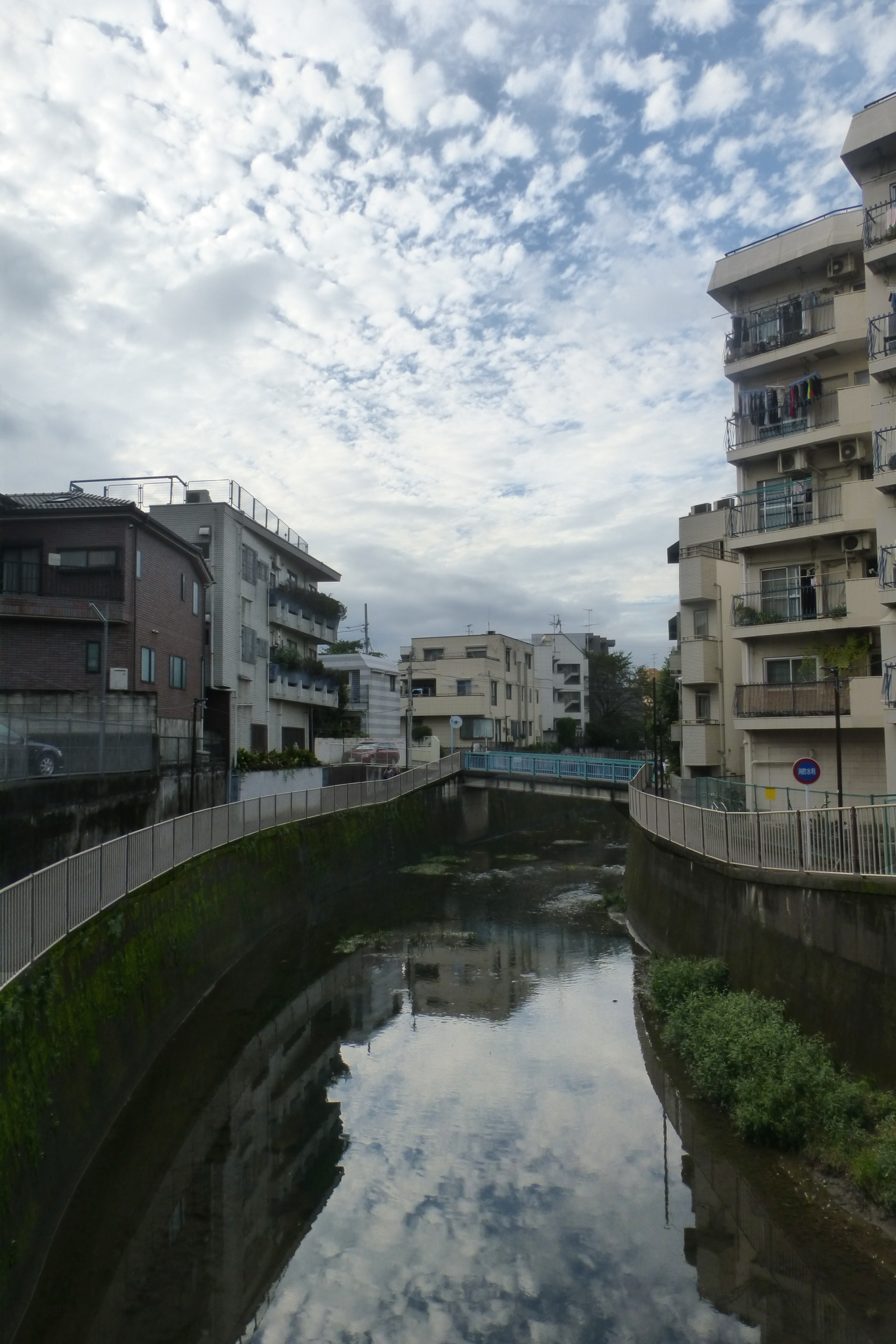

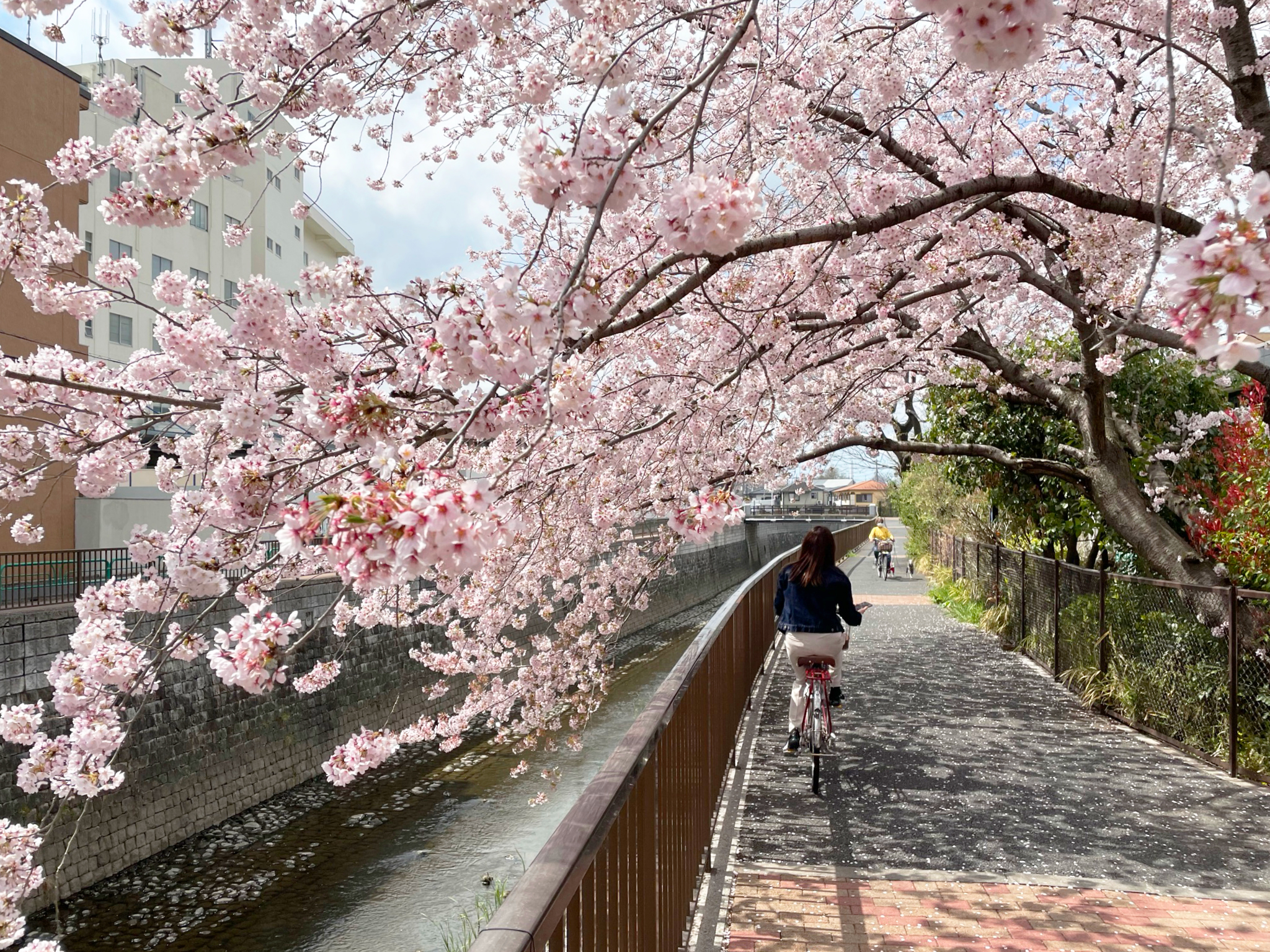
Horinouchi Bridge in Suginami Ward.

Zenpukuji River (善福寺川, Zenpukujigawa) is a class A river that flows through Tokyo and is a tributary of the Kanda River, which is part of the Arakawa River system.

Its source is Zenpukuji Pond, and its stream starts in Minoyama Bridge, block 32, Zenpukuji 2nd Street, Suginami Ward, Tokyo. Its stream ends when it meets with the Kanda River River system.

== History ==
Zenpukuji River was designated a class A river in 1965. With urbanization, the water volume decreased dramatically, and from around 1975, there was almost no water flowing upstream. In 1989, as part of the Tokyo Metropolitan Government's Clean River Restoration Project, the highly treated sewage water that had been channeled into the Senkawa Aqueduct was diverted from the Sekimachi 1st Street intersection, where the open channel of the Senkawa Aqueduct ends, to the foot of Minoyama Bridge, where the water flows out of Zenpukuji Pond, in order to make effective use of it.
