= Kumozu River =

Kumozu River 雲出川
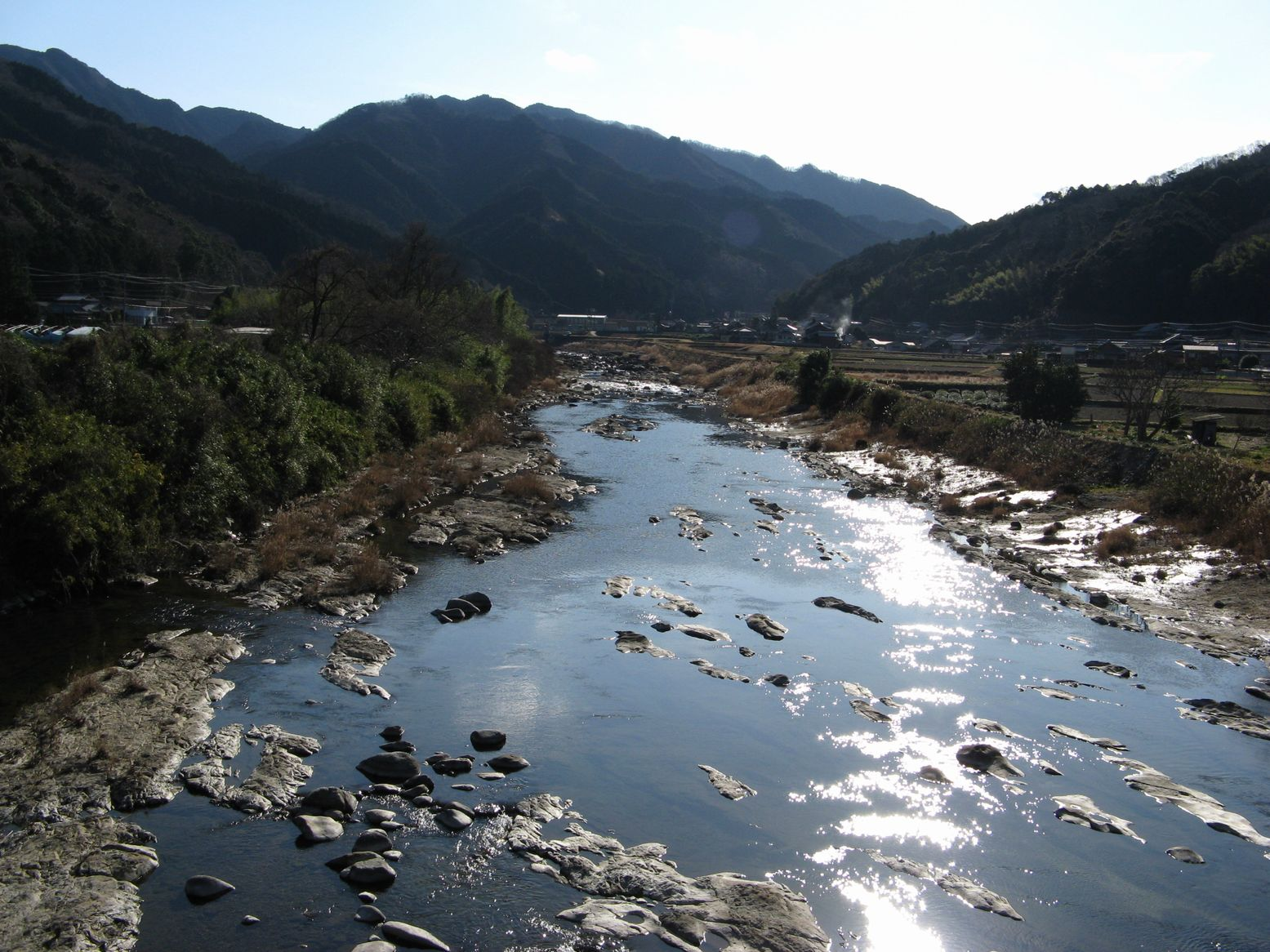
- Kumozu River in 2008

- Location within Japan

Location
- Country: Japan
- State: Honshu
- Region: Mie

Physical characteristics
- Source: Mount Miune
  - elevation: 1,235 m (4,052 ft)
- Mouth: Ise Bay
  - coordinates: 34°38′08″N 136°32′56″E
- Length: 55 km (34 mi)
- Basin size: 550 km^{2} (210 sq mi)

The Kumozu River (Japanese: 雲出川) is a class A river in Mie Prefecture, Japan.
