= Embassy of Singapore, Tokyo =

Embassy of Singapore, Tokyo 駐日シンガポール大使館 Kedutaan Besar Singapura di Jepun 新加坡駐日本大使館
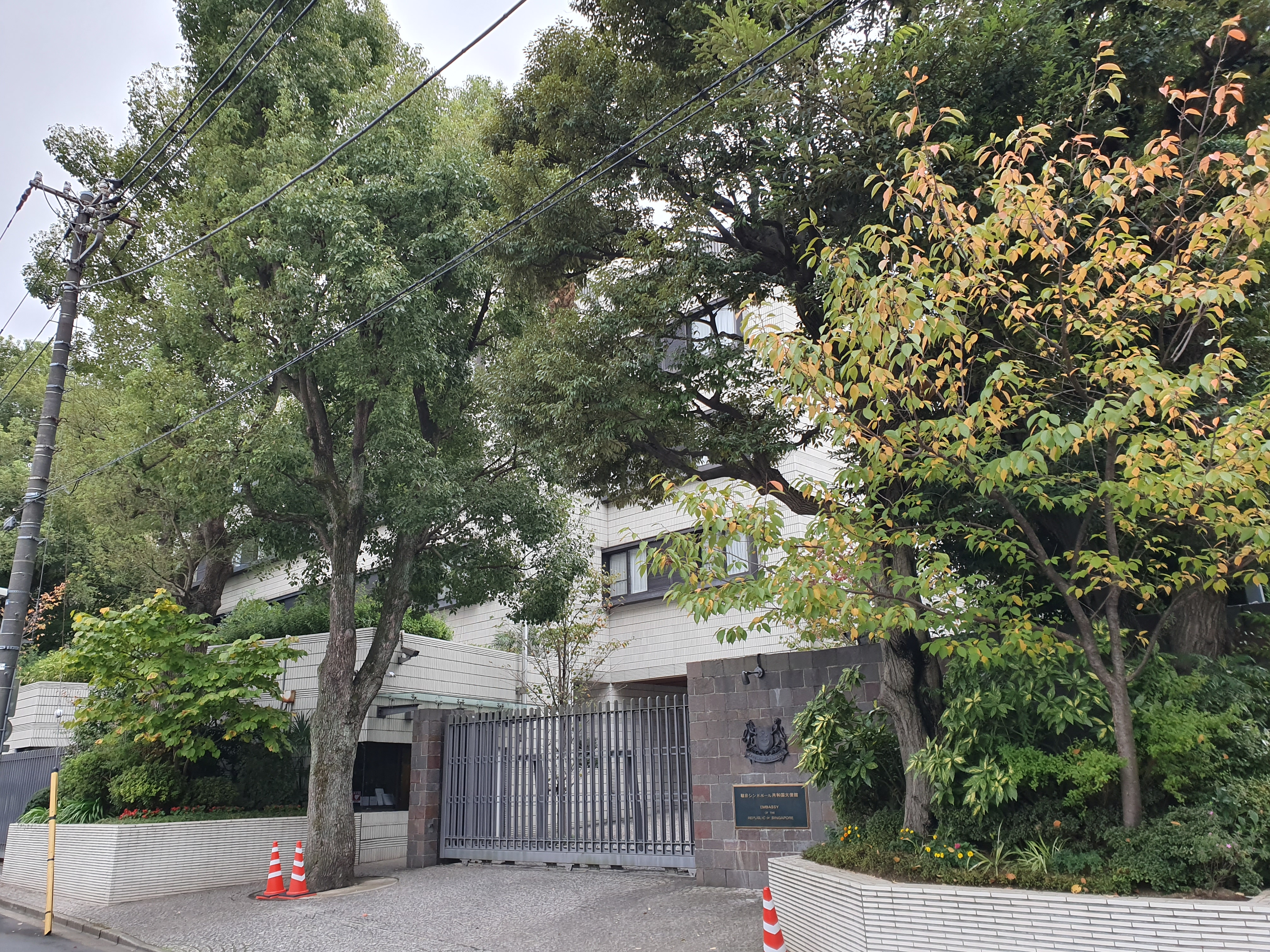
- Location: Tokyo
- Address: 5-12-3 Roppongi, Minato, Tokyo
- Opened: 1966
- Ambassador: Ong Eng Chuan
- Website: https://www.mfa.gov.sg/tokyo

The Embassy of Singapore, Tokyo is Singapore's main diplomatic mission to Japan. It is located at 5-12-3 Roppongi, Minato, Tokyo.

== Overview ==
Japan and Singapore established diplomatic relations on 26 April 1966, a few months after Singapore was expelled from Malaysia and became an independent country. The construction of the current embassy was completed in 1978. It was designed by the Japanese architect Shin'ichi Okada (岡田新一). The garden of the embassy was designed by the Japanese landscape architect Junichi Inada (稲田純一), who played a central role in planning Singapore's national parks for nearly half a century. His last work there was "The Canyon" at the Gardens by the Bay, completed in 2016.

The incumbent ambassador since April 2023 is Ong Eng Chuan, who earned a Bachelor of Engineering degree from Tokyo Institute of Technology in 1993. Before being posted in Tokyo for the second time in his career, he served as Ambassador to Belgium with concurrent accreditation to the European Union, the Netherlands, and Luxembourg from April 2012 to April 2016, and as Deputy Secretary of the Ministry of Foreign Affairs from May 2016 to May 2023.

== Incident ==
=== Voyeuristic photographing ===
On 27 February 2024, Japanese newspaper Yomiuri Shimbun reported that a Singaporean counsellor, Sim Siong Chye, then aged 55, used his mobile phone to voyeuristically photographed a first-year middle school student in the changing room of a public bath in Minato, Tokyo, near the embassy during his tenure as a diplomat.

Staff of the public bath reported the incident to the Tokyo Metropolitan Police Department. Sim was investigated on the spot by the Japanese police and was found having around 700 photos of similar photos of other male customers. The photos were deleted on the spot by Sim after being requested by the Japanese police. Sim refused to go to the police station for further investigation and Japanese police did not arrest him due to his diplomatic immunity. The Metropolitan Police Department was investigating the case with a view to charges of violation of the Act on Prohibition of Child Prostitution and Pornography (production) and the Act on Punishment of Persons for Taking Photographs of Sexual Desire (filming).

The Ministry of Foreign Affairs of Singapore (MFA) said it was notified of the allegations on 1 May after Japanese media outlets contacted the ministry. Sim had returned to Singapore mid April at the end of his tour but did not inform the ministry of the incident until he was asked by the ministry. He was subsequently suspended from duties. The ministry said it was prepared to waive diplomatic immunity if needed. Metropolitan Police Department requested the Ministry of Foreign Affaries, via Japan's Ministry of Foreign Affairs, to bring back Sim for further investigations. SIm returned to Japan on 9 June and on 13 June, fined 300,000 Japanese yen by a court in Japan for trespassing and violating the Tokyo Metropolitan Government's Anti-Nuisance Ordinance. On 2 April 2025, Sim was fired by MFA.

== See also ==
- Japan–Singapore relations
- List of ambassadors of Singapore to Japan
