= Bee Cheng Hiang =

Singaporean food company

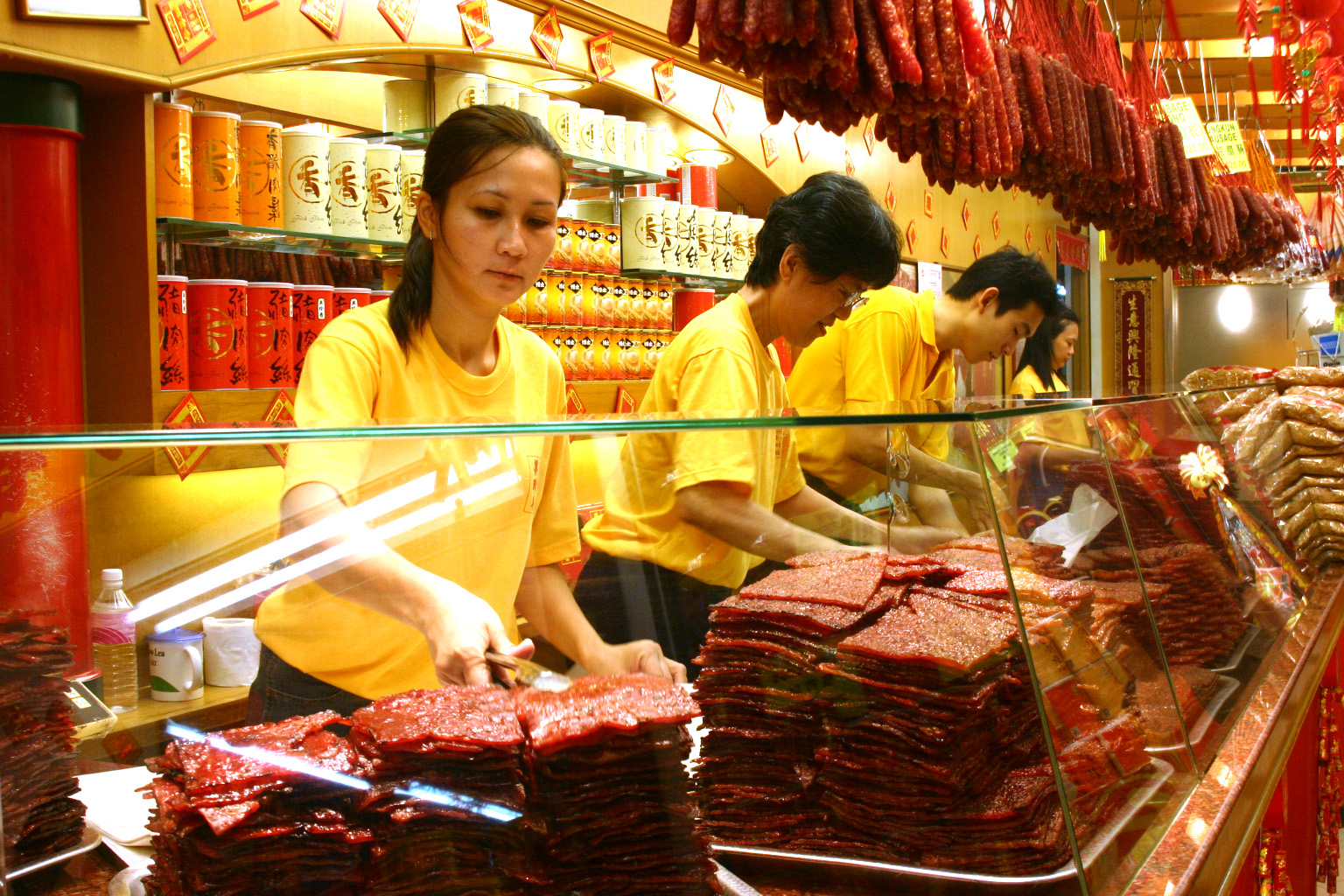
Bakkwa (roasted pork pieces) at a Bee Cheng Hiang store in Singapore

Bee Cheng Hiang (Chinese: 美珍香; Pe̍h-ōe-jī: Bí-chin-hiang; pinyin: Měizhēnxiāng, in English "Beauty-Flavor-Aroma") is a Singaporean company that produces Chinese-style foodstuffs, especially that of Singaporean cuisine. Starting as a market stall in 1933 in Singapore, the company has expanded its operations beyond Singapore to more than 370 retail outlets located in 72 cities, across 13 territories—mainland China, Hong Kong, Macau, Taiwan, South Korea, Indonesia, Malaysia, Japan, Vietnam, and the Philippines.

Its best-known product is bakkwa—smoked and roasted pieces of pork with a consistency similar to jerky. Bee Cheng Hiang introduced "Gourmet Bakkwa" in 2003 (which is bacon-like slices of bakkwa), and, in 2005, the "Chilli Gourmet Bakkwa". Over the years the company has expanded its offerings to include prawn rolls, crispy pork floss, cuttlefish, and sausages, etc.

Bee Cheng Hiang said it is seeing more customers turning to e-commerce. To cut down on delivery costs, it has added a new self-pickup feature on its mobile app.

== Overseas Expansion ==
- Opened first outlet In Malaysia in 1985
- Opened first outlet In Hong Kong in 1992
- Opened first outlet In Indonesia in 1996
- Opened first outlet In Taiwan in 2000
- Opened first outlet In China in 2002
- Opened first outlet In South Korea in 2010
- Opened first outlet In Macau in 2012
- Opened first outlet In Thailand in 2015
- Opened first outlet in Japan in 2016
- Opened first outlet in Cambodia in 2018
