= List of violent typhoons =

Typhoon Champi at its third peak intensity on 20 October 2026

Violent typhoon is the highest category used by the Japan Meteorological Agency (JMA) to classify tropical cyclones in the Northwest Pacific basin. The basin is limited to the north of the equator between the 100th meridian east and the 180th meridian. A violent typhoon is defined as a tropical cyclone that has 10-minute sustained wind speeds of at least 105 knots (194 km/h; 121 mph).

== Background ==
RSMC Tokyo's Tropical Cyclone Intensity Scale
Category	Sustained winds
Violent Typhoon	≥105 knots ≥194 km/h
Very Strong Typhoon	85–104 knots 157–193 km/h
Typhoon	64–84 knots 118–156 km/h
Severe Tropical Storm	48–63 knots 89–117 km/h
Tropical Storm	34–47 knots 62–88 km/h
Tropical Depression	≤33 knots ≤61 km/h

The Northwest Pacific basin covers a vast area in the Pacific Ocean, located north of the equator, between 100°E and 180°E. Several weather agencies monitor this basin, however it is officially monitored by the Japan Meteorological Agency (JMA, RSMC Tokyo), who is responsible for forecasting, naming and issuing warnings for tropical cyclones. Unofficially, the Joint Typhoon Warning Center also monitors the basin, however these warnings measures 1-minute sustained wind speeds, comparing their scale to the Saffir–Simpson scale. The JMA uses a simpler scale on classifying tropical cyclones adapted by the ESCAP/WMO Typhoon Committee measuring 10-minute sustained wind speeds, ranging from a tropical depression, tropical storm, severe tropical storm and typhoon. Furthermore, the JMA divides the typhoon category into three sub-categories for domestic purposes – a strong typhoon, very strong typhoon and violent typhoon.

This article covers a list of systems developing in the Northwest Pacific basin that were classified by the JMA's category of a violent typhoon. The category of a violent typhoon ranges with 10-minute sustained winds of 105 kn (54 m/s; 121 mph; 194 km/h) or greater.

== Systems ==
Key

- † Discontinuous duration (weakened below a "Violent" typhoon then restrengthened to that classification at least once.
- Italicised rows indicate information that is operational. The storm's duration, wind speeds, or pressure could change after its post-analysis.

=== 20th century ===
Name	System dates	Duration (hours)	Sustained wind speeds	Pressure	Areas affected	Damage	Deaths (USD)	Refs
Vera	July 30 – 31, 1977	18†	205 km/h (125 mph)	925 hPa (27.32 inHg)	Taiwan, Ryukyu Islands, East China	Unknown	5	
Babe	September 8, 1977	24	205 km/h (125 mph)	905 hPa (26.72 inHg)	Caroline Islands, Ryukyu Islands, East China	$23 million	23	
Lucy	December 3 – 4, 1977	12	205 km/h (125 mph)	920 hPa (27.17 inHg)	Caroline Islands	None	None	
Rita	October 22 – 26, 1978	96	220 km/h (140 mph)	880 hPa (25.98 inHg)	Micronesia, Philippines	$100 million	>300	
Viola	November 22, 1978	6	195 km/h (120 mph)	910 hPa (26.97 inHg)	Caroline Islands	None	None	
Hope	July 31 – August 1, 1979	24	205 km/h (125 mph)	900 hPa (26.58 inHg)	Mariana Islands, Philippines, Taiwan, South China, Indochina, Bangladesh	Unknown	12	
Judy	August 19 – 20, 1979	24	205 km/h (125 mph)	910 hPa (26.87 inHg)	Mariana Islands, Ryukyu Islands, Taiwan, East China, South Korea	Unknown	111	
Tip	October 11 – 13, 1979	72	260 km/h (160 mph)	870 hPa (25.69 inHg)	Micronesia, Ryukyu Islands, Japan	Unknown	99	
Vera	November 4 – 5, 1979	24	205 km/h (125 mph)	915 hPa (27.02 inHg)	Caroline Islands, Philippines	Unknown	Unknown	
Wynne	October 9 – 11, 1980	54	220 km/h (140 mph)	890 hPa (26.28 inHg)	Mariana Islands, Ryukyu Islands, Japan	10	Unknown	
Elsie	September 27 – 30, 1981	72	220 km/h (140 mph)	895 hPa (26.43 inHg)	None	None	None	
Irma	November 22 – 23, 1981	30†	205 km/h (125 mph)	905 hPa (26.72 inHg)	Philippines	593	$63.3 million	
Bess	July 28 – 30, 1982	42	230 km/h (145 mph)	900 hPa (26.58 inHg)	Japan	95	$2.32 billion	
Cecil	August 8, 1982	12	205 km/h (125 mph)	920 hPa (27.17 inHg)	Taiwan, East China, Korean Peninsula	54	Unknown	
Mac	October 5, 1982	18	220 km/h (140 mph)	895 hPa (26.43 inHg)	Japan	None	$1.5 million	
Wayne	July 24, 1983	18	205 km/h (125 mph)	925 hPa (27.32 inHg)	Philippines, South China	147	Unknown	
Abby	August 8 – 13, 1983	96†	220 km/h (140 mph)	895 hPa (26.43 inHg)	Caroline Islands, Japan	7	Unknown	
Ellen	September 6, 1983	18	205 km/h (125 mph)	925 hPa (27.32 inHg)	Philippines, Taiwan, South China	23	$79.7 million	
Forrest	September 22 – 25, 1983	48†	205 km/h (125 mph)	885 hPa (26.13 inHg)	Mariana Islands, Japan, South Korea	21	Unknown	
Marge	October 4 – 5, 1983	36	220 km/h (140 mph)	895 hPa (26.43 inHg)	Mariana Islands	None	None	
Orchid	November 23, 1983	12	205 km/h (125 mph)	930 hPa (27.46 inHg)	Caroline Islands, Philippines	170	Unknown	
Vanessa	October 25 – 18, 1984	72	220 km/h (140 mph)	880 hPa (25.97 inHg)	Caroline Islands	3	$1.7 million	
Agnes	November 4, 1984	6	195 km/h (120 mph)	925 hPa (27.32 inHg)	Philippines, Indochina	1,029	$96.6 million	
Dot	October 16 – 17, 1985	42	220 km/h (140 mph)	895 hPa (26.43 inHg)	Philippines, South China, Vietnam	90	$68 million	
Lola	May 19 – 20, 1986	42	220 km/h (140 mph)	910 hPa (26.87 inHg)	Caroline Islands	None	None	
Peggy	July 6 – 7, 1986	12	205 km/h (125 mph)	900 hPa (26.58 inHg)	Philippines, Taiwan, South China	422	$2.5 million	
Kim	December 2 – 3, 1986	36	205 km/h (125 mph)	905 hPa (26.72 inHg)	Mariana Islands	None	None	
Betty	August 11 – 12, 1987	18	205 km/h (125 mph)	890 hPa (26.28 inHg)	Philippines, Vietnam, Thailand	92	$100 million	
Holly	September 8 – 10, 1987	48	205 km/h (125 mph)	900 hPa (26.58 inHg)	Marshall Islands	None	None	
Freda	September 10, 1987	18	195 km/h (120 mph)	915 hPa (27.02 inHg)	Caroline Islands, Mariana Islands	None	None	
Lynn	October 20, 1987	6	195 km/h (120 mph)	915 hPa (27.02 inHg)	Mariana Islands, Philippines, Taiwan, South China	49	$42.3 million	
Flo	September 16 – 18, 1990	42	220 km/h (140 mph)	890 hPa (26.28 inHg)	Caroline Islands, Mariana Islands, Japan	38	$4 billion	
Page	November 27, 1990	18	195 km/h (120 mph)	910 hPa (26.87 inHg)	Caroline Islands, Philippines, Japan	None	None	
Ruth	October 24 – 26, 1991	60	215 km/h (130 mph)	895 hPa (26.43 inHg)	Mariana Islands, Philippines	30	Unknown	
Yuri	November 26 – 28, 1991	54	220 km/h (140 mph)	895 hPa (26.43 inHg)	Marshall Islands, Caroline Islands, Mariana Islands	None	$36 million	
Gay	November 20 – 21, 1992	36	205 km/h (125 mph)	900 hPa (26.58 inHg)	Caroline Islands, Mariana Islands, Japan	1	None	
Koryn	June 24 – 25, 1993	24	195 km/h (120 mph)	905 hPa (26.87 inHg)	Caroline Islands, Philippines, South China	37	$224 million	
Melissa	September 16, 1994	18	205 km/h (125 mph)	910 hPa (26.87 inHg)	Marshall Islands, Japan	3	None	
Seth	October 7 – 8, 1994	24	205 km/h (125 mph)	910 hPa (26.87 inHg)	Ryukyu Islands, Japan, Korean Peninsula	9	$2.3 million	
Zelda	November 4 – 5 1994	24	195 km/h (120 mph)	910 hPa (26.87 inHg)	Marshall Islands, Japan	3	None	
Angela	November 1 – 2, 1995	36	215 km/h (130 mph)	910 hPa (26.87 inHg)	Philippines, Vietnam	936	$315 million	
Ivan	October 17 – 18, 1997	30	195 km/h (120 mph)	905 hPa (26.72 inHg)	Caroline Islands, Mariana Islands, Philippines	14	$9.6 million	
Joan	October 17 – 20, 1997	72	195 km/h (120 mph)	905 hPa (26.72 inHg)	Caroline Islands, Mariana Islands	1	$200,000	
Keith	November 2 – 3, 1997	36	205 km/h (125 mph)	910 hPa (26.87 inHg)	Marshall Islands, Caroline Islands, Mariana Islands	None	$15 million	
Zeb	October 13 – 14, 1998	18	205 km/h (125 mph)	900 hPa (26.58 inHg)	Philippines, Japan	122	$576 million	

=== 21st century ===
Name	System dates	Duration (hours)	Sustained wind speeds	Pressure	Areas affected	Deaths	Damage (USD)	Refs
Bilis	August 21 – 22, 2000	24	220 km/h (140 mph)	920 hPa (27.17 inHg)	Philippines, Taiwan, China	71	$668 million	
Faxai	December 22 – 23, 2001	12	195 km/h (120 mph)	915 hPa (27.02 inHg)	Mariana Islands	2	$1 million	
Maemi	September 10 – 11, 2003	18	195 km/h (120 mph)	910 hPa (26.87 inHg)	Japan, Korean Peninsula	120	$4.1 billion	
Chaba	August 22 – 25, 2004	78	205 km/h (125 mph)	910 hPa (26.87 inHg)	Japan, Ryukyu Islands, South Korea	20	$2 billion	
Haitang	July 16 – 17, 2005	24	195 km/h (120 mph)	920 hPa (27.17 inHg)	Taiwan, Ryukyu Islands, East China	13	$1.1 billion	
Saomai	August 9, 2006	12	195 km/h (120 mph)	925 hPa (27.32 inHg)	Mariana Islands, Ryukyu Islands, Taiwan, China	458	$2.5 billion	
Ioke	August 30 – 31, 2006	36	195 km/h (120 mph)	920 hPa (27.17 inHg)	Wake Island	None	None	
Shanshan	September 15 – 16, 2006	24	205 km/h (125 mph)	919 hPa (27.14 inHg)	Taiwan, Ryukyu Islands, Korean Peninsula	11	$2.5 billion	
Yagi	September 21, 2006	12	195 km/h (120 mph)	910 hPa (26.87 inHg)	Japan	None	None	
Durian	November 29, 2006	24	195 km/h (120 mph)	915 hPa (27.02 inHg)	Philippines, Vietnam, Thailand, Malaysia	1,501	$530 million	
Sepat	August 15 – 16, 2007	36	205 km/h (125 mph)	910 hPa (26.87 inHg)	Philippines, Taiwan, China	43	$693 million	
Krosa	October 5 – 6, 2007	27	195 km/h (120 mph)	925 hPa (27.32 inHg)	Taiwan, East China	5	$1.7 billion	
Rammasun	May 10, 2008	12	195 km/h (120 mph)	915 hPa (27.02 inHg)	Japan	4	$9.6 million	
Jangmi	September 27, 2008	18	215 km/h (130 mph)	905 hPa (26.72 inHg)	Taiwan, Japan	8	$87.8 million	
Choi-wan	September 15 – 16, 2009	36	195 km/h (120 mph)	915 hPa (27.02 inHg)	Mariana Islands	None	Unknown	
Melor	October 4 – 5, 2009	36	205 km/h (125 mph)	910 hPa (26.87 inHg)	Caroline Islands, Mariana Islands, Japan	3	$1.5 billion	
Nida	November 25 – 26, 2009	36	215 km/h (130 mph)	905 hPa (26.72 inHg)	Caroline Islands, Mariana Islands	None	None	
Megi	October 17 – 18, 2010	36	230 km/h (145 mph)	885 hPa (26.13 inHg)	Philippines, Taiwan, East China	69	$709 million	
Songda	May 26 – 27, 2011	24	195 km/h (120 mph)	920 hPa (27.17 inHg)	Philippines, Japan	17	$287 million	
Sanba	September 13 – 14, 2012	24	205 km/h (125 mph)	900 hPa (26.58 inHg)	Japan, Korean Peninsula	6	$379 million	
Jelawat	September 24 – 26, 2012	60	205 km/h (125 mph)	905 hPa (26.72 inHg)	Philippines, Taiwan, Japan	2	$27.4 million	
Utor	August 11, 2013	6	195 km/h (120 mph)	925 hPa (27.32 inHg)	Philippines, South China	97	$3.55 billion	
Usagi	September 19 – 20, 2013	36	205 km/h (125 mph)	910 hPa (26.87 inHg)	Philippines, Taiwan, South China	39	$4.32 billion	
Francisco	October 18 – 20, 2013	36	195 km/h (120 mph)	920 hPa (27.17 inHg)	Mariana Islands, Japan	None	$150,000	
Lekima	October 22 – 24, 2013	54	215 km/h (130 mph)	905 hPa (26.87 inHg)	Mariana Islands	None	None	
Haiyan	November 6 – 8, 2013	42	230 km/h (145 mph)	895 hPa (26.43 inHg)	Caroline Islands, Philippines, Vietnam	6,352	$2.98 billion	
Halong	August 2 – 3, 2014	24	195 km/h (120 mph)	920 hPa (27.17 inHg)	Caroline Islands, Mariana Islands, Japan	12	$72.8 million	
Genevieve	August 7 – 8, 2014	18	205 km/h (125 mph)	915 hPa (27.02 inHg)	None	None	None	
Vongfong	October 7 – 9, 2014	48	215 km/h (130 mph)	900 hPa (26.58 inHg)	Caroline Islands, Mariana Islands, Taiwan, Japan, South Korea	9	$161 million	
Nuri	November 2 – 3, 2014	36	205 km/h (125 mph)	910 hPa (26.87 inHg)	Japan	None	Unknown	
Hagupit	December 4 – 5, 2014	42	215 km/h (130 mph)	905 hPa (26.72 inHg)	Caroline Islands, Philippines, Vietnam	18	$114 million	
Maysak	March 31 – April 1, 2015	42	195 km/h (120 mph)	910 hPa (26.87 inHg)	Caroline Islands, Philippines	4	$8.5 million	
Noul	May 10, 2015	18	205 km/h (125 mph)	920 hPa (27.17 inHg)	Caroline Islands, Philippines, Taiwan, Japan	2	$23.8 million	
Soudelor	August 3 – 4, 2015	30	215 km/h (130 mph)	900 hPa (26.58 inHg)	Mariana Islands, Taiwan, East China	59	$4.09 billion	
Dujuan	September 27 – 28, 2015	36	205 km/h (125 mph)	925 hPa (27.32 inHg)	Mariana Islands, Taiwan, East China	3	$407 million	
Nepartak	July 6 – 7, 2016	36	205 km/h (125 mph)	900 hPa (26.58 inHg)	Taiwan, Ryukyu Islands, East China	111	$1.89 billion	
Meranti	September 12 – 14, 2016	42	220 km/h (140 mph)	890 hPa (26.28 inHg)	Mariana Islands, Philippines, Taiwan, China	47	$4.79 billion	
Chaba	October 3, 2016	18	215 km/h (130 mph)	905 hPa (26.72 inHg)	Mariana Islands, Japan, South Korea	10	$1.29 billion	
Haima	October 18 – 19, 2016	30	215 km/h (130 mph)	900 hPa (26.58 inHg)	Caroline Islands, Philippines, Taiwan, China	19	$972 million	
Nock-ten	December 24 – 25, 2016	24	195 km/h (120 mph)	915 hPa (27.02 inHg)	Caroline Islands, Philippines	13	$123 million	
Jelawat	March 30, 2018	12	195 km/h (120 mph)	915 hPa (27.02 inHg)	Caroline Islands, Mariana Islands	2	Unknown	
Maria	July 9, 2018	18	195 km/h (120 mph)	915 hPa (27.02 inHg)	Mariana Islands, Ryukyu Islands, Taiwan, East China	1	$626 million	
Jebi	August 31 – September 1, 2018	36	195 km/h (120 mph)	915 hPa (27.02 inHg)	Mariana Islands, Japan	20	$18.6 billion	
Mangkhut	September 11 – 14, 2018	90	205 km/h (125 mph)	905 hPa (26.72 inHg)	Mariana Islands, Philippines, South China, Vietnam	134	$3.77 billion	
Trami	September 24 – 25, 2018	18	195 km/h (120 mph)	915 hPa (27.02 inHg)	Mariana Islands, Taiwan, Japan	4	$2.69 billion	
Kong-rey	October 1 – 2, 2018	30	215 km/h (130 mph)	900 hPa (26.58 inHg)	Caroline Islands, Taiwan, Japan, Korean Peninsula	3	$172 million	
Yutu	October 24 – 27, 2018	48†	215 km/h (130 mph)	900 hPa (26.58 inHg)	Caroline Islands, Mariana Islands, Philippines, Taiwan, South China	30	$854 million	
Wutip	February 23 – 24, 2019	18	195 km/h (120 mph)	920 hPa (27.17 inHg)	Caroline Islands, Mariana Islands	None	$3.3 million	
Lekima	August 8, 2019	6	195 km/h (120 mph)	925 hPa (27.32 inHg)	Caroline Islands, Philippines, Ryukyu Islands, Taiwan, China, South Korea	90	$9.28 billion	
Hagibis	October 7 – 19, 2019	72	195 km/h (120 mph)	915 hPa (27.02 inHg)	Mariana Islands, Japan, Russia Far East	98	$15 billion	
Halong	November 5 – 6, 2019	30	215 km/h (130 mph)	905 hPa (26.72 inHg)	None	None	None	
Haishen	September 4, 2020	12	195 km/h (120 mph)	910 hPa (26.87 inHg)	Ryukyu Islands, Japan, Korean Peninsula	4	$100 million	
Goni	October 30 – 31, 2020	36	220 km/h (140 mph)	905 hPa (26.72 inHg)	Philippines, Vietnam, Laos	26	$393 million	
Surigae	April 17 – 19, 2021	42	220 km/h (140 mph)	895 hPa (26.43 inHg)	Caroline Islands, Philippines	10	$10.5 million	
Chanthu	September 10 – 11, 2021	42	215 km/h (130 mph)	905 hPa (26.72 inHg)	Philippines, Taiwan, East China, Ryukyu Islands, South Korea, Japan	None	$30 million	
Mindulle	September 26, 2021	18	195 km/h (120 mph)	920 hPa (27.17 inHg)	Mariana Islands	None	None	
Rai	December 16 – 18, 2021	12†	195 km/h (120 mph)	915 hPa (27.02 inHg)	Caroline Islands, Palau, Philippines, Spratly Islands, Vietnam, South China, Hong Kong, Macau	410	$1.02 billion	
Hinnamnor	August 30 – September 1, 2022	18†	195 km/h (120 mph)	920 hPa (27.17 inHg)	Japan, Philippines, Taiwan, Eastern China, South Korea, North Korea, Russian Far East	20	$1.81 billion	
Nanmadol	September 16 – 18, 2022	18	195 km/h (120 mph)	910 hPa (26.78 inHg)	Japan, South Korea, Russian Far East	4	$1.2 billion	
Mawar	May 25 – June 3, 2023	72	215 km/h (130 mph)	900 hPa (26.58 inHg)	Federated States of Micronesia, Guam, Rota, Northern Mariana Islands	6	$136 million	
Saola	August 22 – September 3, 2023	51	195 km/h (120 mph)	920 hPa (27.17 inHg)	Philippines, South China, Macau, Taiwan, Hong Kong, Northern Vietnam	3	$545 million	
Bolaven	October 11 – 13, 2023	45	215 km/h (130 mph)	905 hPa (26.58 inHg)	Federated States of Micronesia, Guam, Northern Mariana Islands, Bonin Islands	None	Unknown	
Yagi	September 5 – 6, 2024	48	195 km/h (120 mph)	915 hPa (27.02 inHg)	Palau, Philippines, South China, Hong Kong, Macau, Vietnam, Laos, Thailand	924	>$14 billion	
Krathon	October 1, 2024	12	195 km/h (120 mph)	920 hPa (27.17 inHg)	Philippines, Taiwan, Ryukyu Islands	18	$48.1 million	
Man-yi	November 16–17, 2024	18†	195 km/h (120 mph)	920 hPa (27.17 inHg)	Guam, Northern Mariana Islands, Caroline Islands, Palau, Philippines, Taiwan, South China, Hong Kong, Macau	14	$65 million	
Ragasa	September 21–23, 2025	36	205 km/h (125 mph)	905 hPa (26.72 inHg)	Philippines, Taiwan, Ryukyu Islands, Southern China, Vietnam, Laos, Cambodia, Thailand	29	$2.85 billion	
Sinlaku	April 12–14, 2026	42	215 km/h (130 mph)	905 hPa (26.72 inHg)	Micronesia, Mariana Islands	17	$1.55 billion	
Bavi	July 4–6, 2026	66	215 km/h (130 mph)	900 hPa (26.58 inHg)	Marshall Islands, Mariana Islands	23	>$141 million	
Dolphin	July 29 – August 1, 2026	54	205 km/h (125 mph)	915 hPa (27.02 inHg)	Marshall Islands, Ryukyu Islands, Taiwan, East China, Philippines	(6)	>$5.02 million	
Champi	October 19–22, 2026	63†	215 km/h (130 mph)	900 hPa (26.58 inHg)	Micronesia, Mariana Islands, Philippines, Taiwan, Ryukyu Islands	None	Unknown	

== Climatology ==
Violent typhoons by month
Month	Number of storms
January	0
February	1
March	2
April	2
May	6
June	1
July	9
August	17
September	24
October	27
November	18
December	6

Violent typhoons by decade
Period	Number of storms
1977–79	9
1980s	23
1990s	14
2000s	16
2010s	34
2020s	19

== See also ==
- List of super typhoons
- Typhoon
- Pacific typhoon season
- 2026 Pacific typhoon season
