= Typhoon Ivan =

Pacific typhoon in 1997

Typhoon Ivan (Narsing)
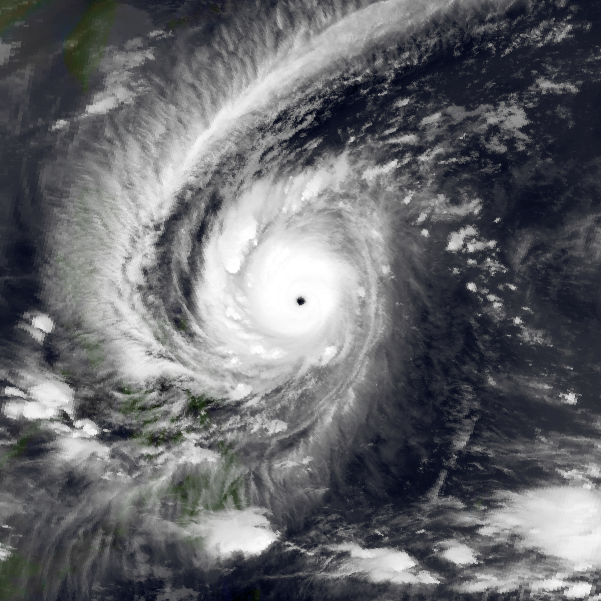
- Ivan approaching Luzon at peak intensity on October 17

Meteorological history
- Formed: October 13, 1997
- Extratropical: October 25, 1997
- Dissipated: October 26, 1997

Violent typhoon
- 10-minute sustained (JMA)
- Highest winds: 195 km/h (120 mph)
- Lowest pressure: 905 hPa (mbar); 26.72 inHg

Category 5-equivalent super typhoon
- 1-minute sustained (SSHWS/JTWC)
- Highest winds: 295 km/h (185 mph)
- Lowest pressure: 872 hPa (mbar); 25.75 inHg

Overall effects
- Fatalities: 14 total
- Missing: 2
- Damage: $9.6 million (1997 USD)
- Areas affected: Marshall Islands, Guam and the Philippines
- IBTrACS
- Part of the 1997 Pacific typhoon season

Typhoon Ivan, known in the Philippines as Super Typhoon Narsing, was an extremely intense tropical cyclone that existed simultaneously with another storm of the same intensity, Typhoon Joan, in October 1997. Forming out of an area of disturbed weather on October 13, Ivan gradually intensified into a typhoon as it tracked steadily to the west-northwest. On October 15, the storm underwent rapid intensification and reached an intensity corresponding to Category 5 status on the Saffir–Simpson Hurricane Scale. Late on October 17, Ivan reached its peak strength with winds of 295 km/h (183 mph) and a barometric pressure of 905 hPa (mbar). Shortly thereafter, the typhoon began to weaken as it approached the Philippines. Ivan eventually made landfall in northern Luzon with winds of 220 km/h (140 mph) on October 20, before weakening to a tropical storm the next day. The storm then curved northeastward and became extratropical on October 25. It dissipated the following day.

Although Ivan was a powerful storm at landfall, its effects were relatively minor compared to its intensity; however, 14 people were killed during the storm and two others were listed as missing. Agricultural industries sustained the most severe damage, as thousands of animals drowned in the storm. Total damage was estimated at $9.6 million (1997 USD; $13.1 million 2009 USD). A total of 1,779 homes were destroyed, 13,771 others were damaged and 4,600 hectares of farmland were flooded.

== Meteorological history ==
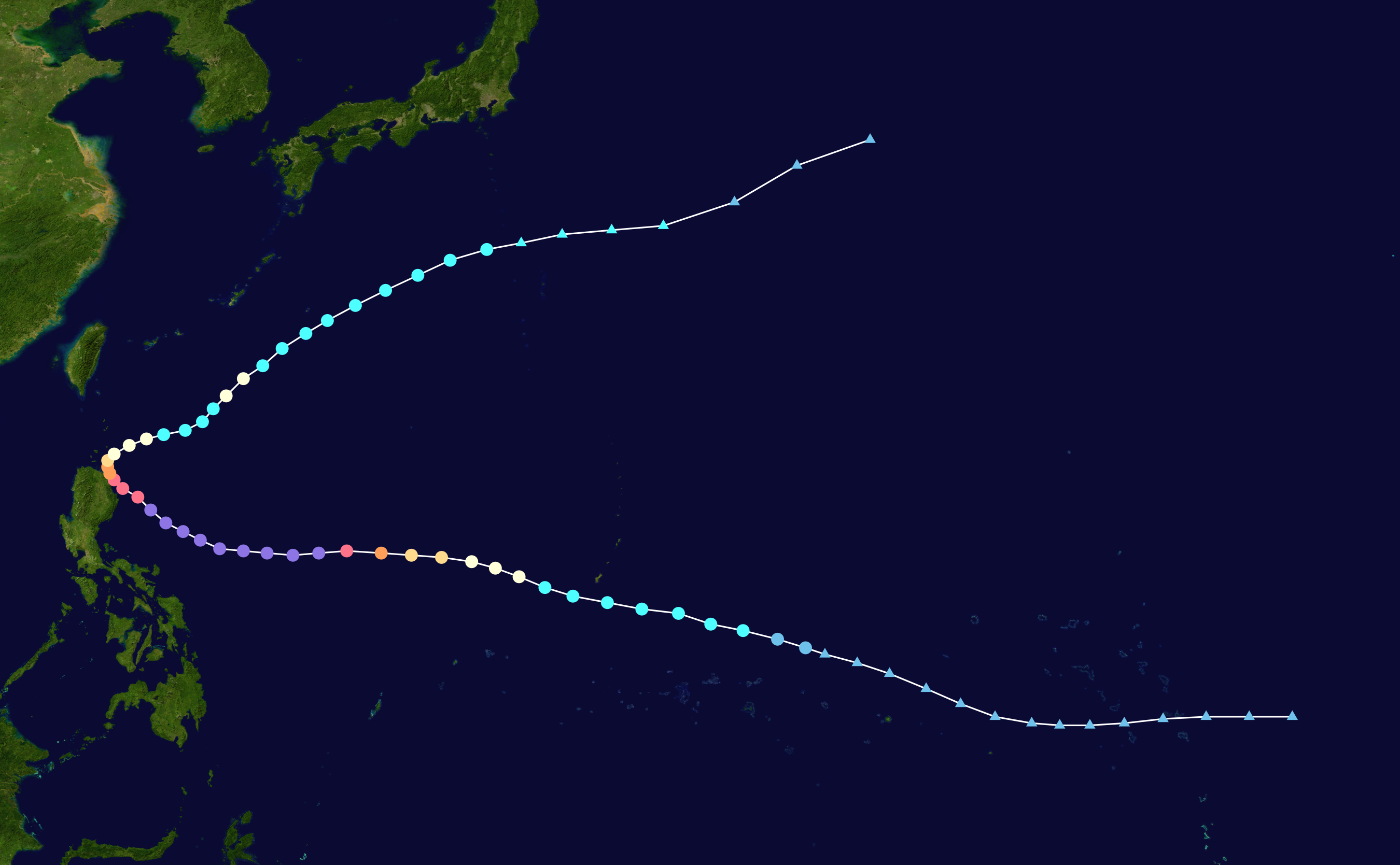
Map plotting the storm's track and intensity, according to the Saffir–Simpson scale Map key Saffir–Simpson scale Tropical depression (≤38 mph, ≤62 km/h) Tropical storm (39–73 mph, 63–118 km/h) Category 1 (74–95 mph, 119–153 km/h) Category 2 (96–110 mph, 154–177 km/h) Category 3 (111–129 mph, 178–208 km/h) Category 4 (130–156 mph, 209–251 km/h) Category 5 (≥157 mph, ≥252 km/h) Unknown Storm type Tropical cyclone Subtropical cyclone Extratropical cyclone, remnant low, tropical disturbance, or monsoon depression

Typhoon Ivan originated from an area of disturbed weather near the equator during the first week of October 1997. Two equatorial troughs, one in the Northern Hemisphere and one in the Southern Hemisphere, developed from this system. Three resultant areas of low pressure formed: one in the Southern Hemisphere developed into Tropical Cyclone Lusi on October 8, and two north of the equator steadily tracked westward. The eastern low developed into Typhoon Joan, while the western cyclone became the system that would intensify into Typhoon Ivan. Situated in an environment without significant convective activity, this system initially struggled to become organized. However, the disturbance began to mature, and by October 11, the Joint Typhoon Warning Center (JTWC) discovered a low-level circulation center, prompting the issuance of a Tropical Cyclone Formation Alert the following day.

The system quickly tracked toward the west-northwest at a forward speed of 33 km/h (21 mph). The JTWC issued its first advisory on the storm early on October 13, designating it Tropical Depression 27W. Around this time, the Japan Meteorological Agency (JMA) also classified the cyclone as a tropical depression.

Convective banding features developed late on October 13. The JTWC upgraded the depression to a tropical storm and gave it the name Ivan. Early the next day, the JMA also upgraded Ivan to a tropical storm. Later on October 14, Ivan passed roughly 100 km (62 mi) south of Guam and subsequently intensified. Several hours afterwards, the JMA upgraded Ivan to a typhoon. During a 24-hour span, Ivan's winds increased from 120 to 270 km/h (75 to 168 mph), making it a Category 5 super typhoon, the eighth of the season, as well as being a twin Category 5 with Joan. Just 18 hours after Typhoon Joan reached the same peak windspeed, at 1800 UTC on October 17, Ivan attained its peak intensity with winds of 295 km/h (183 mph) and an official barometric pressure of 905 hPa (mbar). However, the JTWC reported an unofficial pressure of 872 hPa (mbar), which would tie Ivan for the second strongest tropical cyclone worldwide with Typhoons Gay, Angela, Joan, Keith, Zeb and Hurricane Patricia.

Due to the storm's proximity to Typhoon Joan, forecast models anticipated Ivan to re-curve before reaching the Philippines; however, the storm maintained its track and did not take the northward turn until impacting the country. The typhoon began to slow and weaken, and on October 20, its center made landfall in extreme northern Luzon with winds of 220 km/h (140 mph). After emerging into the Luzon Strait, Ivan turned to the north-northeast and weakened to a tropical storm. On October 22, the storm briefly re-attained typhoon status before accelerating in forward speed. The system steadily weakened and the JTWC issued its final advisory on the storm on October 24. The JMA continued to monitor Ivan as a tropical cyclone for another day before classifying it as extratropical. The remnants of the powerful typhoon eventually dissipated on October 26.

== Preparations and impact ==
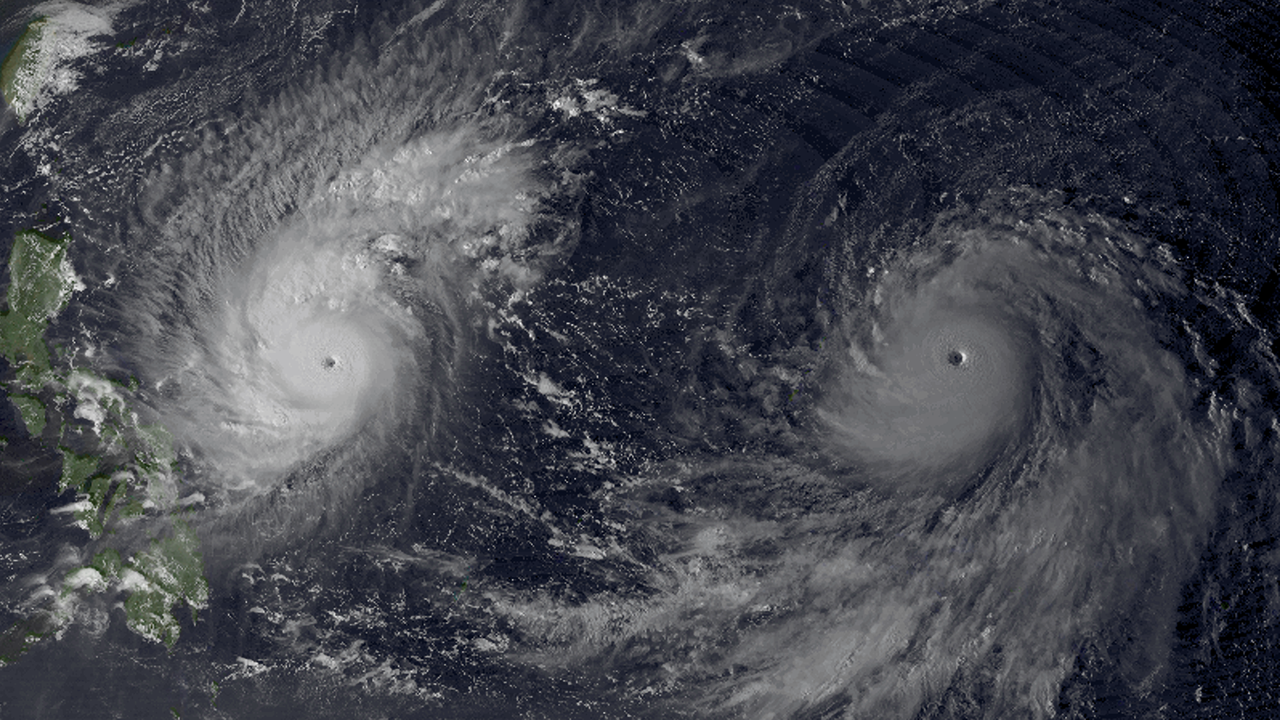
Typhoons Ivan (left) and Joan (right) on October 17

Thousands of people evacuated from northern areas of the Philippines as Ivan approached. Power was shut off prior to the storm to reduce the risk of electrocution. Four flights were cancelled in Taiwan, Hong Kong, and the Philippines due to the storm. Residents in Taiwan were advised to take precautions for Typhoon Ivan, though autumn typhoons are rare on the island. Vessels were urged to stay at port due to rough seas throughout the Philippines. Disaster agencies were put on high alert; relief supplies were then stockpiled, the navy was placed on standby, and military search and rescue vehicles were prepared.

On October 20, Ivan made landfall in the northern Philippines, producing torrential rains that triggered waist-deep flooding in localized areas. Severe crop losses were reported throughout northern Luzon. One person drowned in floodwaters in Cagayan. Elsewhere in the country, two other people drowned in floodwaters. Numerous power lines and trees were downed throughout the region, and rain-triggered landslides blocked several roads. Throughout the country, a total of 14 people were killed and two others were listed as missing. Poultry farms and fisheries sustained significant damage; an estimated $3.6 million in losses resulted from lost stocks in the two businesses. Several thousand animals drowned during the storm. Total damage was estimated at $9.6 million (1997 USD; $13.1 million 2009 USD). A total of 1,779 homes were destroyed, 13,771 others were damaged and 4,600 hectares of croplands were inundated by Typhoon Ivan. Rainfall from the storm was considered to be helpful as the area impacted had been suffering from below average rainfall for several months. Minor damage was also reported in the Marshall Islands. The island of Tiyan recorded 5.26 in (134 mm) of precipitation, contributing to above-average rainfall during the month of October.

== See also ==
- Typhoon Ruth (1991)
