= Typhoon Champi =

Pacific typhoon in 2026

Typhoon Champi (Rosal)
- Champi at peak intensity east of the Philippines on October 22

Meteorological history
- Formed: October 11, 2026
- Extratropical: October 25, 2026
- Dissipated: October 27, 2026

Violent typhoon
- 10-minute sustained (JMA)
- Highest winds: 215 km/h (130 mph)
- Lowest pressure: 900 hPa (mbar); 26.58 inHg

Category 5-equivalent super typhoon
- 1-minute sustained (SSHWS/JTWC)
- Highest winds: 295 km/h (185 mph)
- Lowest pressure: 894 hPa (mbar); 26.40 inHg

Overall effects
- Fatalities: 1+
- Injuries: 616+
- Damage: ≥$32.2 million (2026 USD)
- Areas affected: Northern Mariana Islands; Japan (particularly Ryukyu Islands, Kyushu, Shikoku, Southern Honshu); Taiwan; South Korea
- Part of the 2026 Pacific typhoon season

Typhoon Champi, also known in the Philippines as Rosal, was a large, long-lived, and extremely powerful tropical cyclone that affected the Guam, Taiwan, the Ryukyu Islands, and parts of Japan in late October 2026. The thirtieth named storm, thirteenth typhoon, and fourth violent typhoon of the active 2026 Pacific typhoon season, Champi originated from a disturbance near Micronesia that was upgraded by JMA to a tropical depression on October 11. Tracking generally northwestward, the system gradually organized and was also later upgraded to a tropical depression by the Joint Typhoon Warning Center (JTWC) as 29W on October 14. The next day, the system strengthened into a tropical storm on both JMA and JTWC's scales, and was named Champi by the former. Favorable environmental conditions allowed Champi to undergo rapid intensification on October 16, and it quickly intensified from a severe tropical storm into a typhoon. Gathering more strength, Champi attained Category 5-equivalent super typhoon status as it neared Guam and the Northern Mariana Islands by October 17. Following an eyewall replacement cycle that caused a temporary fluctuation in its intensity, Champi quickly regained Category 5 strength. On October 20, the Philippine Atmospheric, Geophysical and Astronomical Services Administration (PAGASA) assigned the local name Rosal to Champi as it approached the Philippine Area of Responsibility (PAR).

== Meteorological history ==
Map plotting the storm's track and intensity, according to the Saffir–Simpson scale Map key Saffir–Simpson scale Tropical depression (≤38 mph, ≤62 km/h) Tropical storm (39–73 mph, 63–118 km/h) Category 1 (74–95 mph, 119–153 km/h) Category 2 (96–110 mph, 154–177 km/h) Category 3 (111–129 mph, 178–208 km/h) Category 4 (130–156 mph, 209–251 km/h) Category 5 (≥157 mph, ≥252 km/h) Unknown Storm type Tropical cyclone Subtropical cyclone Extratropical cyclone, remnant low, tropical disturbance, or monsoon depression

On 11 October, the Japan Meteorological Agency (JMA) reported that a tropical depression formed near Micronesia. A few hours later, the Joint Typhoon Warning Center (JTWC) designated a disturbance 306 nautical miles east-northeast of Saipan, Northern Mariana Islands. On 14 October, the JTWC recognized the disturbance as a tropical depression, assigning it the designation 29W. A day later, the JMA upgraded the depression into a tropical storm, assigning it the name Champi. Later that day, the JTWC followed suit and upgraded the system into a tropical storm. On 16 October, the JMA upgraded the system into a severe tropical storm. Later that day, the JMA upgraded the system into a typhoon, with the JTWC following suit later that day, saying it had started rapid intensification. Champi then attained one-minute sustained winds of 220 km/h (140 mph) on 17 October as it neared Guam, before becoming a Category 5-equivalent super typhoon with 1-minute sustained winds of 270 km/h (165 mph) After the initial peak, an eyewall replacement cycle occurred, temporarily weakening it back to a Category 4-equivalent typhoon. After completing the eyewall replacement cycle, Champi reintensified to a Category 5-equivalent typhoon with 1-minute sustained winds of 260 km/h (160 mph) before a second eyewall replacement cycle again weakened it to a Category 4-equivalent typhoon. After completing this eyewall replacement cycle, Champi intensified into a Category 5-equivalent super typhoon for the third time, and reached its peak intensity as a violent typhoon, with 10-minute sustained winds of 215 km/h (130 mph), 1-minute sustained winds of 295 km/h (185 mph), and a pressure of 900 hPa (26.58 inHg).

Lower sea surface temperatures and oceanic heat content caused the storm to begin weakening on 21 October. The system further weakened to a Category 2-equivalent typhoon on 22 October due to increasing wind shear. However, on 23 October, the system managed to slightly organize and re-intensified into a Category 3-equivalent typhoon as it approached the Ryukyu Islands due to brief favourable conditions. Later that day, Champi's eyewall passed very close to Yonaguni and made an anti-clockwise loop east of Taiwan before recurving north-eastwards. Shortly after, lower sea surface temperatures and increasing wind shear led to the storm weakening back to a minimal typhoon. Champi further weakened to a tropical storm as it approached Japan and became extratropical on 25 October.

== Preparations ==
Typhoon Champi passing just south of the Mariana Islands late on October 17

=== Guam and Mariana Islands ===
Typhoon Champi passed within 12 miles (19 km) of Guam's southern tip on 18 October (local time), ultimately sparing the island from the strongest winds of the cyclone. While the eye's core of extreme winds remained mostly offshore, it was still close enough to cause notable damage to homes and knock down trees on the island.

=== Japan ===
Ahead of Champi, four Japanese airlines cancelled over 160 flights. All Nippon Airways suspended all flights to and from Miyako Airport and New Ishigaki Airport in Okinawa Prefecture on October 23.

=== Philippines ===
On October 17 at 21:00 UTC (October 18 at 05:00 PHT), PAGASA began issuing advisories for the system in anticipation of its entry to the country's area of responsibility. On October 20 at 03:00 UTC (11:00 PHT), PAGASA issued Signal 1 warnings on Batanes, the eastern portions of the Babuyan Islands and mainland Cagayan, and the northeastern portions of Isabela and Catanduanes.

=== Taiwan ===
School and work were cancelled across most of the nation. Weather authorities in Taipei issued a marine warning for waters east and north of the main island.

=== Alaska ===
On October 28, the National Weather Service issued a coastal flood advisory for areas between Hooper Bay to Kotlik, with water levels potentially rising 2 to 4 feet (0.6-1.2 m) above the high tide line. The Seward Peninsula region was also forecasted for possible high surf and coastal erosion.

== Impact ==
=== Guam ===
World Central Kitchen reported an estimated 50% of the island lost power.

=== Taiwan ===
One man died in Liuqiu Island due to strong waves, while 616 people were injured. Champi also caused over power outages in 146,000 homes. Storm surges of over 6–10 metres (20–33 ft) tall were recorded across the east coast of Taiwan with the tallest being recorded at Fugang Harbor with a storm surge height of 10 metres (33 ft). Agricultural damage from Champi reached NT$997 million (US$30.6 million).

=== Japan ===
At least 8,400 households lost power, according to the Okinawa Electric Power Company as of 14:00 local time on October 23. Haterumajima Island also faced power outage and temporary water supply disruption. Agricultural damage across Okinawa Prefecture amounted to ¥252 million (US$1.61 million).

=== South Korea ===
Champi brought torrential rainfall across South Korea, particularly with 440 millimetres (17 in) recorded on Mount Hallasan in Jeju, 147 millimetres (5.8 in) recorded in Busan, and 113 millimetres (4.4 in) recorded in Yeosu.

=== Alaska ===
The renmants of Champi caused significant impacts in the state of Alaska. Wind gusts in the state peaked at 79 mph (127 km/h) in Anchorage, with Seward recording 3.3 in (84 mm) of rain. In the mountains, rainfall totals were estimated in the 4–5 in (100–130 mm) range. Additionally, snow fell in the Alaska Range.

== See also ==
- Weather of 2026
- Tropical cyclones in 2026
- Other storms of the same name
- List of violent typhoons
- Typhoon Mekkhala (2026) – weaker typhoon earlier in the year that took a similar trajectory towards Japan
- Typhoon Bavi (2026) – similarly long-lived Category 5-equivalent typhoon that also tracked through the Mariana Islands, also earlier in the year
