= Typhoon Fengshen (2002) =

Pacific typhoon in 2002

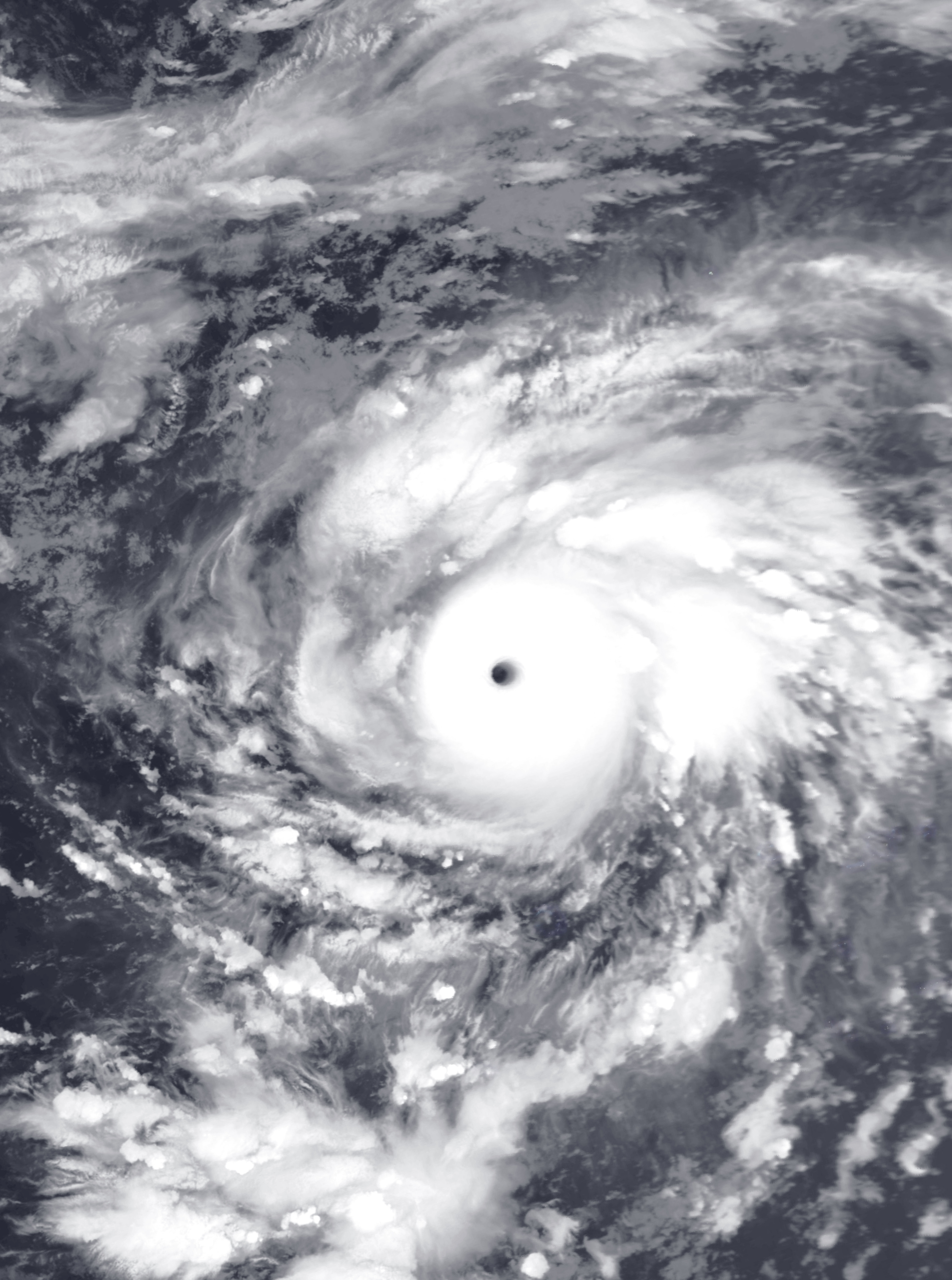
- Typhoon Fengshen near peak intensity on July 18

Meteorological history
- Formed: July 13, 2002
- Dissipated: July 28, 2002

Very strong typhoon
- 10-minute sustained (JMA)
- Highest winds: 185 km/h (115 mph)
- Lowest pressure: 920 hPa (mbar); 27.17 inHg

Category 5-equivalent super typhoon
- 1-minute sustained (SSHWS/JTWC)
- Highest winds: 270 km/h (165 mph)
- Lowest pressure: 892 hPa (mbar); 26.34 inHg

Overall effects
- Fatalities: 5 total
- Damage: $4 million (2002 USD)
- Areas affected: Japan, China
- IBTrACS
- Part of the 2002 Pacific typhoon season

Typhoon Fengshen was the strongest storm of the 2002 Pacific typhoon season. It developed on July 13 from the monsoon trough near the Marshall Islands, and quickly intensified due to its small size. By July 15, Fengshen attained typhoon status, and after initially moving to the north, it turned toward the northwest. On July 18, the typhoon reached its peak intensity of 185 km/h (115 mph 10‑minute winds), according to the Japan Meteorological Agency. The Joint Typhoon Warning Center estimated peak winds of 270 km/h (165 mph 1‑minute winds), and the agency estimated that Fengshen was a super typhoon for five days. This broke the record for longest duration at that intensity, previously set by Typhoon Joan in 1997, and which was later tied by Typhoon Ioke in 2006.

While near peak intensity, Typhoon Fengshen underwent the Fujiwhara effect with Typhoon Fung-wong, causing the latter storm to loop to its south. Fengshen gradually weakened while approaching Japan, and it crossed over the country's Ōsumi Islands on July 25 as a severe tropical storm. The typhoon washed a freighter ashore, killing four people and forcing the other 15 crew members to be rescued. In the country, Fengshen dropped heavy rainfall that caused mudslides and left $4 million (¥475 million 2002 JPY), (Note: All damage totals are in 2002 United States dollars unless otherwise noted.) in crop damage. There was an additional death in the country. After affecting Japan, Fengshen weakened in the Yellow Sea to a tropical depression, before moving across China's Shandong Peninsula and dissipating on July 28.

== Meteorological history ==
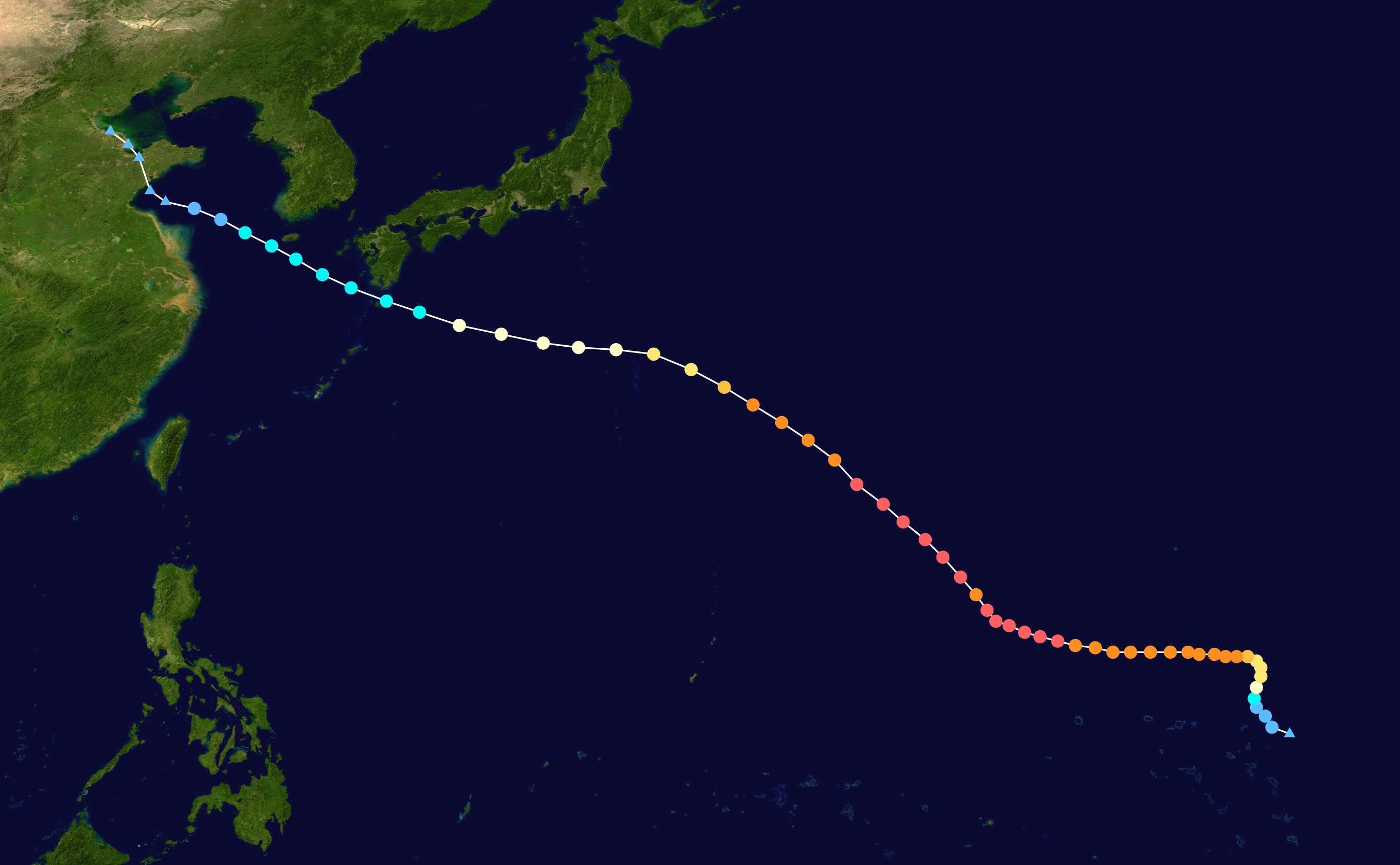
Map plotting the storm's track and intensity, according to the Saffir–Simpson scale Map key Saffir–Simpson scale Tropical depression (≤38 mph, ≤62 km/h) Tropical storm (39–73 mph, 63–118 km/h) Category 1 (74–95 mph, 119–153 km/h) Category 2 (96–110 mph, 154–177 km/h) Category 3 (111–129 mph, 178–208 km/h) Category 4 (130–156 mph, 209–251 km/h) Category 5 (≥157 mph, ≥252 km/h) Unknown Storm type Tropical cyclone Subtropical cyclone Extratropical cyclone, remnant low, tropical disturbance, or monsoon depression

Late on July 13, a tropical depression developed near the Marshall Islands northeast of Kwajalein Atoll. The cyclone quickly strengthened into Tropical Storm Fengshen just six hours after forming. (Note: The name Fengshen (Mandarin: 风神, [fɤŋ˥ ʂən˧˥]) was contributed by China and literally means "god of wind" in Mandarin.) On July 14, the Joint Typhoon Warning Center (JTWC) (Note: The Joint Typhoon Warning Center is a joint United States Navy – United States Air Force task force that issues tropical cyclone warnings for the western Pacific Ocean and other regions.) initiated warnings on Fengshen just two hours after first monitoring the disturbance. By that time, the system consisted of a distinct circulation with developing convection, located in an area of weak wind shear. The storm initially moved northwestward, emerging from the monsoon trough as a small cyclone. Quick intensification followed, and an upper-level low to the northwest assisted in providing outflow. After a 13 km (8 mi) wide eye developed, the Japan Meteorological Agency (JMA) (Note: The Japan Meteorological Agency is the official Regional Specialized Meteorological Center for the western Pacific Ocean.) upgraded Fengshen to a typhoon on July 15 to the southwest of Wake Island; the JTWC also upgraded the storm the same day.

On July 16, Fengshen turned sharply westward due to a subtropical ridge to its northwest, and it maintained that movement for the next four days. By late on July 18, the JMA estimated that Fengshen attained maximum sustained winds of 185 km/h (115 mph 10‑minute), around the same time the JTWC upgraded the storm to a super typhoon. After maintaining its peak intensity for 24 hours, Fengshen weakened slightly and began a turn to the northwest. The weakening was possibly due to an eyewall replacement cycle, and although previously it was a small storm, the typhoon gradually increased in size. Around that time of its weakening, Fengshen began undergoing the Fujiwhara effect with Typhoon Fung-wong; the latter looped to the south of Fengshen and dissipated on July 29. On July 21, Fengshen began re-intensifying, and the JMA reported that the typhoon again reached winds of 185 km/h (115 mph 10‑minute). At around the same time, the JTWC estimated winds of 270 km/h (165 mph 1‑minute). Fengshen retained much of its intensity until July 22, being a super typhoon for five days. This set the record for greatest duration at the intensity, surpassing the previous record of 114 hours set by Typhoon Joan in 1997; Fengshen's record was later tied by Typhoon Ioke in 2006.

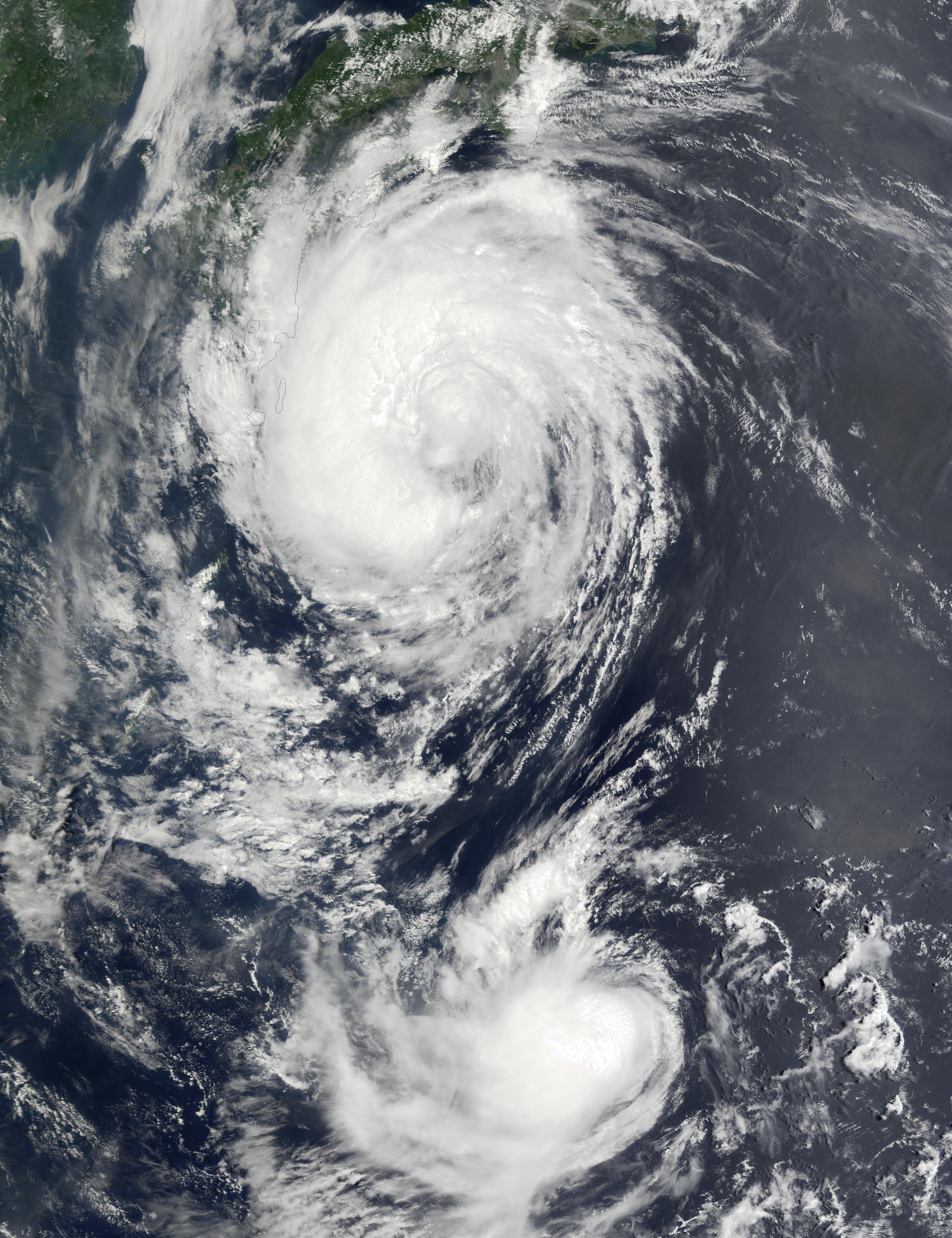
Typhoons Fengshen (north) and Fung-wong (south) undergoing the Fujiwhara effect on July 25

After several days as a powerful typhoon, Fengshen began a weakening trend due to decreased outflow and dry air. It weakened below super typhoon status after being at that intensity for five days. On July 24, Fengshen turned more to the west while passing to the south of mainland Japan, and the next day it weakened below typhoon intensity. At 1145 UTC on July 25, Fengshen made landfall on Yakushima in Japan's Ōsumi Islands, while a severe tropical storm. The next day, the storm passed a short distance southwest of Jeju Island offshore South Korea. After entering the Yellow Sea, Fengshen weakened into a tropical depression, and on July 27 the JTWC discontinued advisories, after much of the convection had dissipated. The JMA continued tracking the system, and Fengshen made landfall on China's Shandong Peninsula late on July 27. The next day, the depression dissipated over the Bohai Sea.

== Preparations and impact ==
Before Fengshen affected Japan, airline officials canceled more than 30 flights, and train and bus service was also interrupted. Along the coast of Kyushu, Fengshen washed a freighter onshore and split it in two, which was traveling from New Orleans, Louisiana to Kagoshima Prefecture. Four people were drowned while escaping the broken vessel, while the remaining crew of 19 were rescued. The typhoon produced strong winds and heavy rain in the country. A station in Miyazaki Prefecture reported the highest rainfall in Japan with a total of 717 mm (28.2 in). Most of the precipitation fell in a 24‑hour period, and the heaviest 1 hour total was 52 mm (2.0 in) in Taira, Toyama. The highest winds in Japan was 101 km/h (63 mph) recorded in Kōchi Prefecture. The storm left about 8,200 homes in Kagoshima Prefecture without power. High rainfall caused at least six mudslides, one of which damaged a county road. A total of 20 homes were damaged in the country, and 200 families were evacuated. High rains damaged 5,699 hectares (14,083 acres) of crop fields, totaling $4 million (¥475 million 2002 JPY). (Note: The total was originally reported in Yen. Total converted via the Oanda Corporation website.) Fengshen killed one person and severely injured another person in the country.

The remnants of Fengshen produced heavy rainfall in northeastern China. The storm affected the capital city of Beijing, becoming the first storm to produce significant impact there since Typhoon Rita in 1972. In a two-day period, a station in the city reported 41.4 mm (1.63 in) of rainfall. The heaviest rainfall was in Jilin province, where 104.9 mm (4.13 in) was recorded in Yushu.

== See also ==
- Other tropical cyclones named Fengshen
