= List of storms named Gay =

The name Gay has been used for five tropical cyclones in the northwest Pacific Ocean and for one within the Australian region of the Indian Ocean.

In the northwest Pacific:

- Typhoon Gay (1981) (T8124, 24W, Walding), a Category 2 typhoon that weakened to a Category 1 before brushing the eastern coast of Japan
- Typhoon Gay (1985) (T8503, 03W, Bining), a Category 3 typhoon that remained well off the coast of Japan
- Tropical Storm Gay (1988) (T8816, 13W), a minimal tropical storm that stayed well out to sea
- Typhoon Gay (1989) (T8929, 32W), a severe tropical cyclone that struck Thailand then crossed into the Indian Ocean Basin becoming a Category 5 tropical cyclone before striking India
- Typhoon Gay (1992) (T9231, 31W, Seniang) – long-lived Category 5 super typhoon storm that affected the Marshall Islands and struck Guam

In the Australian region:

- Cyclone Gay (1965)
