= Typhoon Joan (1997) =

Pacific typhoon in 1997

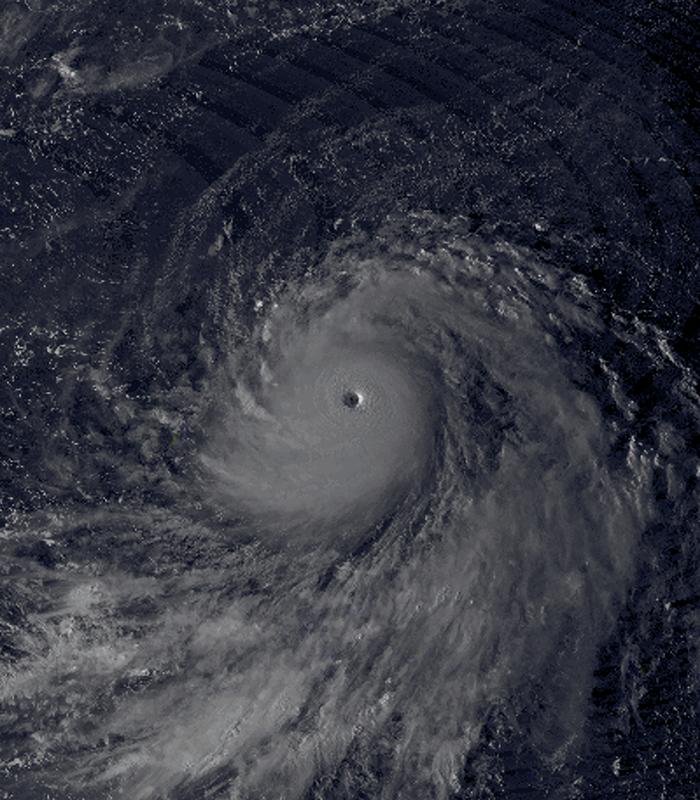
- Typhoon Joan at peak intensity on October 17

Meteorological history
- Formed: October 13, 1997
- Extratropical: October 24, 1997
- Dissipated: October 26, 1997

Violent typhoon
- 10-minute sustained (JMA)
- Highest winds: 195 km/h (120 mph)
- Lowest pressure: 905 hPa (mbar); 26.72 inHg

Category 5-equivalent super typhoon
- 1-minute sustained (SSHWS/JTWC)
- Highest winds: 295 km/h (185 mph)
- Lowest pressure: 872 hPa (mbar); 25.75 inHg

Overall effects
- Fatalities: 1 confirmed, 2 missing
- Damage: $200,000
- Areas affected: Marshall Islands, Guam
- IBTrACS
- Part of the 1997 Pacific typhoon season

Typhoon Joan was the longest-lasting super typhoon at the time, maintaining 1-minute maximum sustained winds of at least 240 km/h (150 mph) for 4.5 days. (Note: Tropical cyclone intensities are measured by maximum sustained winds. In the western Pacific Ocean, the Japan Meteorological Agency estimates sustained winds over a duration of 10 minutes, while the Joint Typhoon Warning Center estimates sustained winds over 1 minute. Winds sustained over 1 minute are roughly 12% higher than 10 minute winds.) Joan, concurrently with Typhoon Ivan to its west, also became the strongest typhoons at the same time in the northwest Pacific Ocean. The 25th named storm during the hyperactive 1997 Pacific typhoon season, Joan developed from the same trough as Typhoon Ivan on October 11. It moved northwestward and later to the west, undergoing explosive deepening to its peak intensity on October 15. One typhoon warning agency estimated that Joan was among the strongest storms on record in the basin, and that Ivan and Joan marked the first occurrence of simultaneous super typhoons. While near peak intensity, Joan passed between Anatahan and Saipan in the Northern Marianas Islands. Later, the typhoon weakened and turned to the north and east, becoming extratropical on October 24.

On Saipan, Typhoon Joan destroyed 37 houses and caused an island-wide power outage. Three people were injured due to boarding up their house during the storm. On nearby Anatahan, high winds caused $200,000 (1997 USD) worth of crop and property damage. Later, high waves affected southern Japan and northwestern Hawaii. On Chichi-jima, Joan caused a boat to capsize, killing one of its occupants and leaving two others missing.

== Meteorological history ==
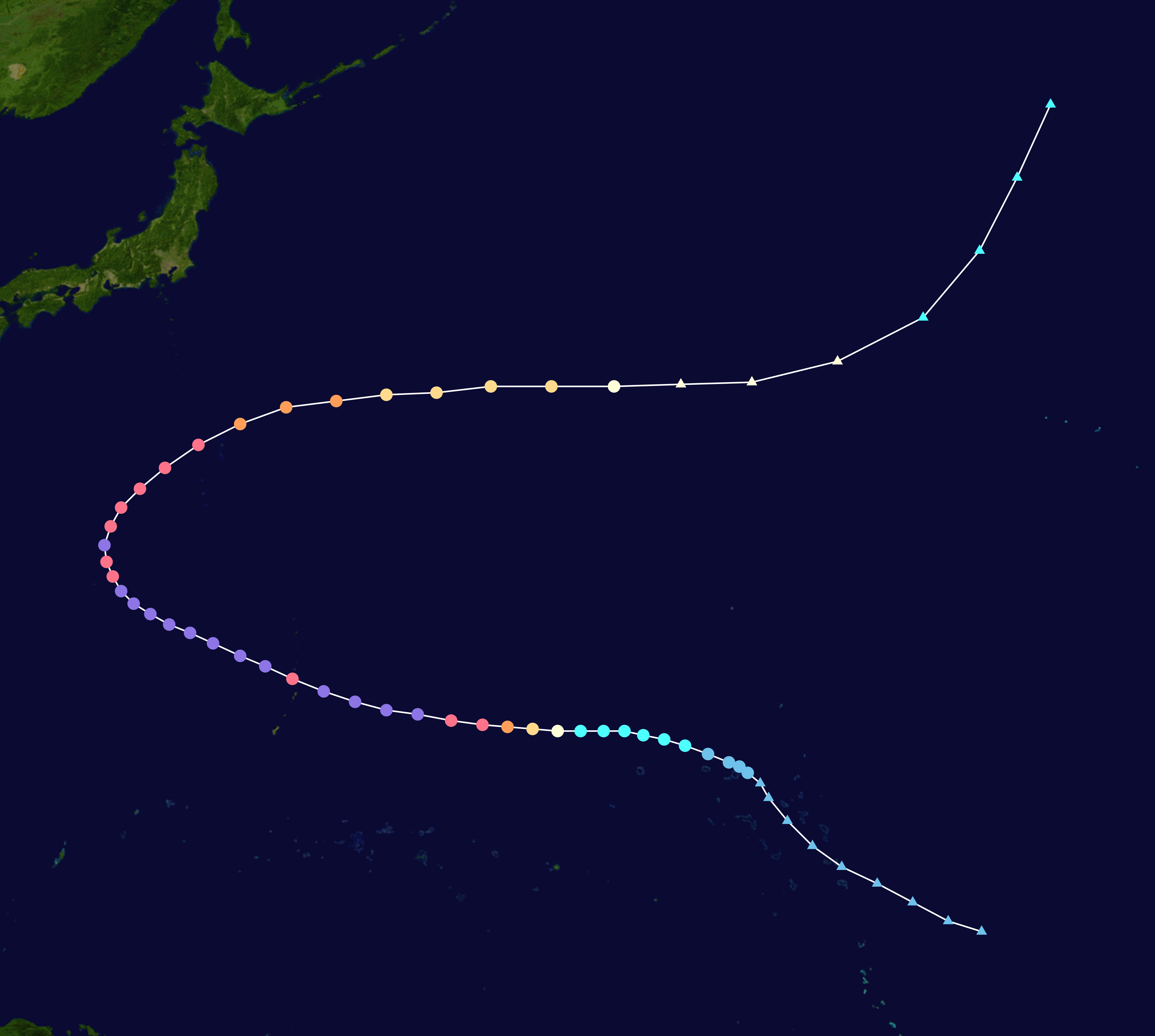
Map plotting the storm's track and intensity, according to the Saffir–Simpson scale Map key Saffir–Simpson scale Tropical depression (≤38 mph, ≤62 km/h) Tropical storm (39–73 mph, 63–118 km/h) Category 1 (74–95 mph, 119–153 km/h) Category 2 (96–110 mph, 154–177 km/h) Category 3 (111–129 mph, 178–208 km/h) Category 4 (130–156 mph, 209–251 km/h) Category 5 (≥157 mph, ≥252 km/h) Unknown Storm type Tropical cyclone Subtropical cyclone Extratropical cyclone, remnant low, tropical disturbance, or monsoon depression

In the first week of October 1997, westerly winds near the equator in the western Pacific Ocean produced troughs – extended areas of low pressure – at a low latitude in the northern and southern hemisphere. The system in the South Pacific eventually developed into Tropical Cyclone Lusi, while the trough in the northern hemisphere eventually spawned two systems – Typhoon Ivan formed to the west, and the system that would eventually become Typhoon Joan developed along the eastern periphery. By October 10, the eastern system consisted of an area of poorly-organized convection, moving slowly to the northwest. On the next day, satellite imagery suggested a circulation had developed. The system increased in size and the convection organized further, prompting the Joint Typhoon Warning Center (JTWC) (Note: The Joint Typhoon Warning Center is a joint United States Navy – United States Air Force task force that issues tropical cyclone warnings for the western Pacific Ocean and other regions.) to initiate advisories on Tropical Depression 28W on October 13. Also on that day, the Japan Meteorological Agency (JMA) (Note: The Japan Meteorological Agency is the official Regional Specialized Meteorological Center for the western Pacific Ocean.) estimated that a tropical depression had developed near the Marshall Islands.

After its development, the depression turned more to the west, intensifying into Tropical Storm Joan on October 14. Early in the storm's duration, neither the JTWC nor most tropical cyclone forecast models anticipated significant strengthening beyond 1-minute winds of 185 km/h (115 mph); this was due to a fairly weak monsoon trough and normal atmospheric pressures in the region. Late on October 15, the JTWC upgraded Joan to typhoon status, and the JMA followed suit the next day. Over a 36‑hour period beginning at 1800 UTC on October 15, the JTWC estimated that the pressure decreased by 100 mbar (3.0 inHg), or roughly 2.4 mbar (0.071 inHg) per hour; based on the agency's assessment, Joan underwent explosive deepening during that time, reaching an estimated minimum pressure of 872 mbar (25.8 inHg), and maximum 1-minute sustained winds of 295 km/h (183 mph). Near peak intensity, Joan had a well-defined eye within a circular area of very deep convection, organized to such an extent that it warranted a Dvorak rating of at least T8.0, the highest number on the scale used to estimate tropical cyclone intensities via satellite imagery. If the estimate were correct, it would make Joan among the top five Pacific typhoons on record. At 0000 UTC on October 17, the JTWC estimated peak 1-minute sustained winds of 295 km/h (183 mph), making Joan a super typhoon, the ninth of the season, only 18 hours before Typhoon Ivan would also reach the same peak windspeed. By contrast, the JMA estimated peak 10-minute winds in Joan of 195 km/h (121 mph) with a pressure of 905 mbar (26.7 inHg).

While near peak intensity on October 17, Joan was located about 2,100 km (1,300 mi) east of Typhoon Ivan, which had also reached super typhoon status; the JTWC later noted that it was "the first observation of two tropical cyclones of such extreme intensity existing simultaneously in the Northwest Pacific." Despite the proximity to Ivan, the two typhoons did not undergo the Fujiwhara effect. The JTWC estimated that Joan weakened slightly after reaching peak winds, although the JMA maintained the typhoon at peak intensity for nearly three whole days. Joan gradually turned more to the northwest, passing between Anatahan and Saipan in the Northern Marianas Islands (NMI) on October 18. On October 20, the JMA estimated that the typhoon began weakening, and on the same day Joan turned sharply to the north. On the next day, Joan weakened below super typhoon intensity for the first time in 4.5 days, a record at the time based on JTWC analysis. This record was later surpassed by Typhoon Fengshen in 2002 and Typhoon Ioke in 2006. By October 21, the typhoon had accelerated to the east and was quickly weakening. The next day, Joan passed about 230 km (140 mi) north of the Japanese island of Iwo Jima. On October 24, the typhoon turned to the northeast while losing tropical characteristics, and that day the JMA ceased tracking Joan. The JTWC declared the typhoon as extratropical on October 25 around the same time it crossed the International Date Line. Former Typhoon Joan merged with a cold front and re-intensified while approaching the Aleutian Islands, and was noted by the Mariners Weather Log as an extratropical storm on October 26.

== Impact ==
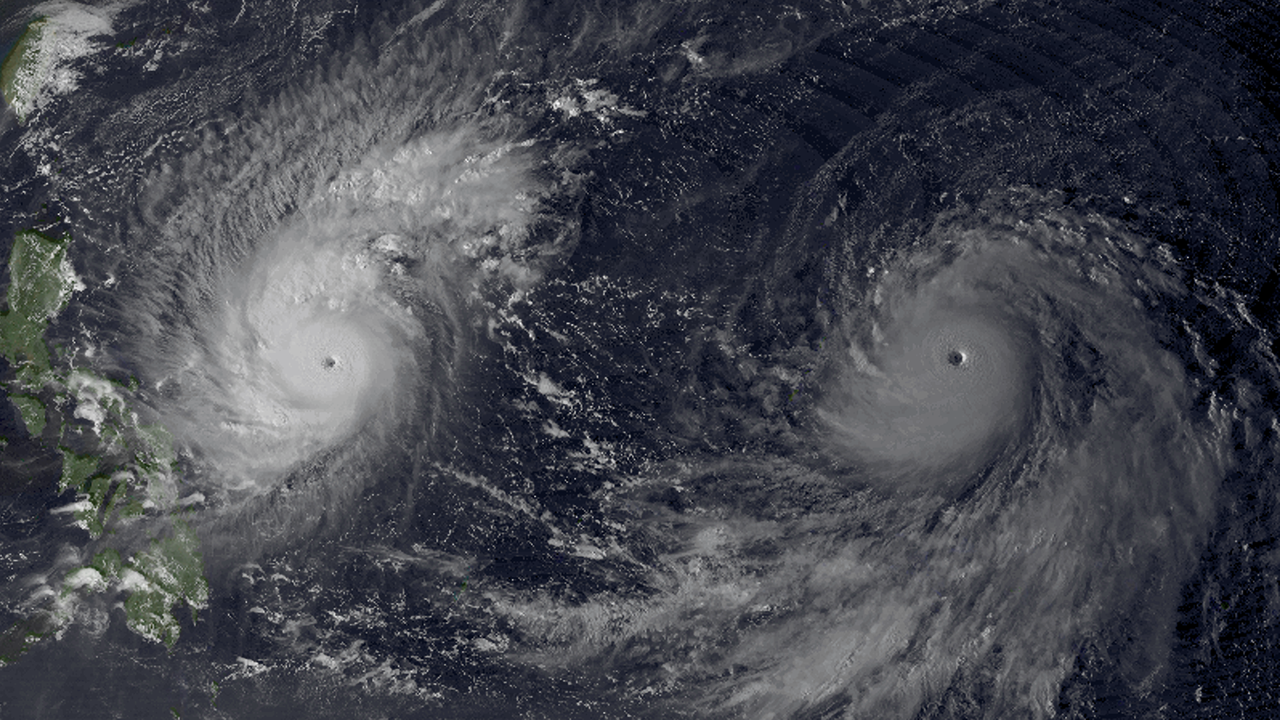
Typhoons Ivan (left) and Joan (right) on October 17

While passing about 80 km (50 mi) of Saipan, Joan produced wind gusts of 157 km/h (98 mph), strong enough to destroy 37 homes and damage the roofs of several other houses. Residents were slow to prepare for the typhoon, and as a result, three people were injured while boarding up their house during the arrival of the strong winds. The passage of Joan left the entire island of Saipan without power, although electrical crews quickly worked to restore the outages. During the storm's passage, about 900 people stayed in shelters, after the government opened six schools for residents. In nearby Anatahan, Joan left heavy damage to boats, machinery, and public buildings. The typhoon damaged various crops, and monetary damage was estimated at $200,000 (1997 USD). As a result of the damage, both islands within the NMI were declared disaster areas, which allowed residents and businesses to apply for federal loans through the United States Small Business Administration.

While passing between Saipan and Anatahan in the NMI, the eye of Joan was visible by NEXRAD from Guam, despite being 285 km (177 mi) north of the island. An outer rainband moved across the island, producing 56 mm (2.2 in) of rainfall at Anderson Air Force Base and a wind gust of 66 km/h (41 mph) at the National Weather Service office in Tiyan.

Typhoon Joan produced waves as high as 7 m (23 ft) in the southern islands of Japan. In Chichi-jima, the typhoon dropped 115 mm (4.5 in) and brought winds as strong as 91 km/h (57 mph). The combination of strong winds and high waves on the island broke a boat from a moorings, causing it to capsize when the boat struck rocks. Of the five people on board, two swam safely to shore, two were reported missing, and one person was confirmed killed. The extratropical remnants of Joan also produced high swells in Hawaii, with wave heights of 4.6 m (15 ft) along northern shores.

== See also ==
- Other tropical cyclones named Joan
- Typhoon Hester (1952)
- Typhoon Keith (1997)
- Typhoon Fengshen (2002)
- Typhoon Yuri (1991)
