= Typhoon Gay (1992) =

Pacific typhoon in 1992

Typhoon Gay (Seniang)
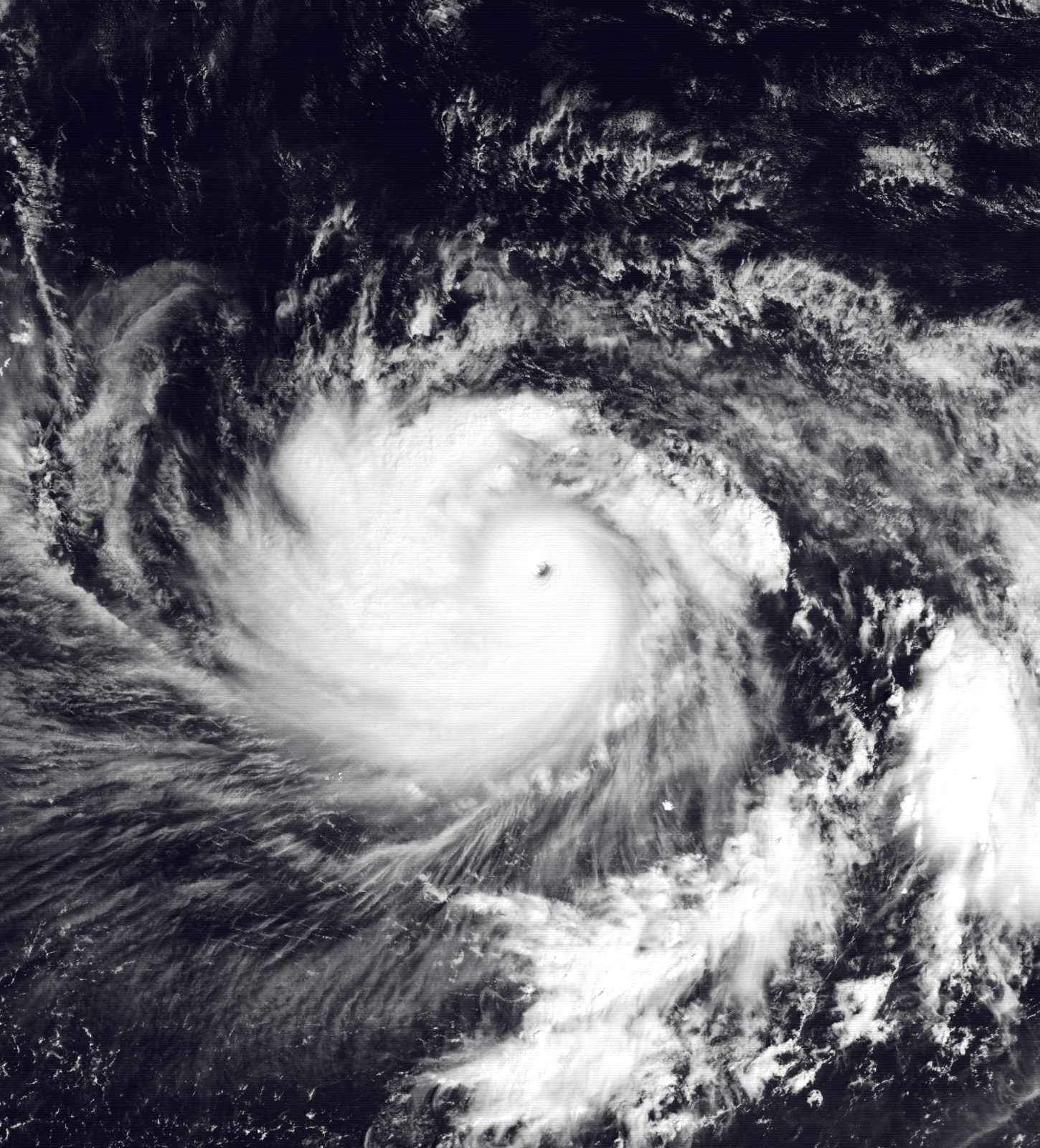
- Gay near peak intensity on November 20

Meteorological history
- Formed: November 14, 1992
- Extratropical: November 29, 1992
- Dissipated: December 1, 1992

Violent typhoon
- 10-minute sustained (JMA)
- Highest winds: 205 km/h (125 mph)
- Lowest pressure: 900 hPa (mbar); 26.58 inHg

Category 5-equivalent super typhoon
- 1-minute sustained (SSHWS/JTWC)
- Highest winds: 295 km/h (185 mph)
- Lowest pressure: 872 hPa (mbar); 25.75 inHg

Overall effects
- Fatalities: 1 total
- Damage: None
- Areas affected: Marshall Islands, Caroline Islands, Mariana Islands, Guam, Japan, Aleutian Islands
- IBTrACS
- Part of the 1992 Pacific typhoon season

Typhoon Gay, known in the Philippines as Super Typhoon Seniang, was the strongest and longest-lasting storm of the 1992 Pacific typhoon season and most intense globally in 1992. It formed on November 14 near the International Date Line from a monsoon trough, which also spawned two other systems. Typhoon Gay later moved through the Marshall Islands as an intensifying typhoon, and after passing through the country it reached its peak intensity over open waters. The Joint Typhoon Warning Center (JTWC) estimated peak winds of 295 km/h (183 mph) and a minimum barometric pressure of 872 mb (25.8 inHg). However, the Japan Meteorological Agency (JMA), which is the official warning center in the western Pacific, estimated winds of 205 km/h (127 mph), with a pressure of 900 mbar (27 inHg). Gay weakened rapidly after peaking because of interaction with another typhoon, and it struck Guam with winds of 160 km/h (99 mph) on November 23. The typhoon briefly re-intensified before weakening and becoming extratropical south of Japan on November 30.

The typhoon first affected the Marshall Islands, where 5,000 people became homeless and heavy crop damage was reported. The nation's capital of Majuro experienced power and water outages during the storm. There were no fatalities among Marshall Islands citizens, although the typhoon killed a sailor traveling around the world. When Gay struck Guam, it became the sixth typhoon of the year to affect the island. Most of the weaker structures had been destroyed during Typhoon Omar earlier in the year, resulting in little additional damage from Gay. Because of its substantial weakening, the typhoon had a disrupted inner-core and produced minimal rainfall. However, strong winds scorched the plants on Guam with saltwater, causing extensive defoliation. Further north, high waves from the typhoon destroyed a house on Saipan, and heavy rainfall in Okinawa, Japan, caused flooding and power outages.

== Meteorological history ==
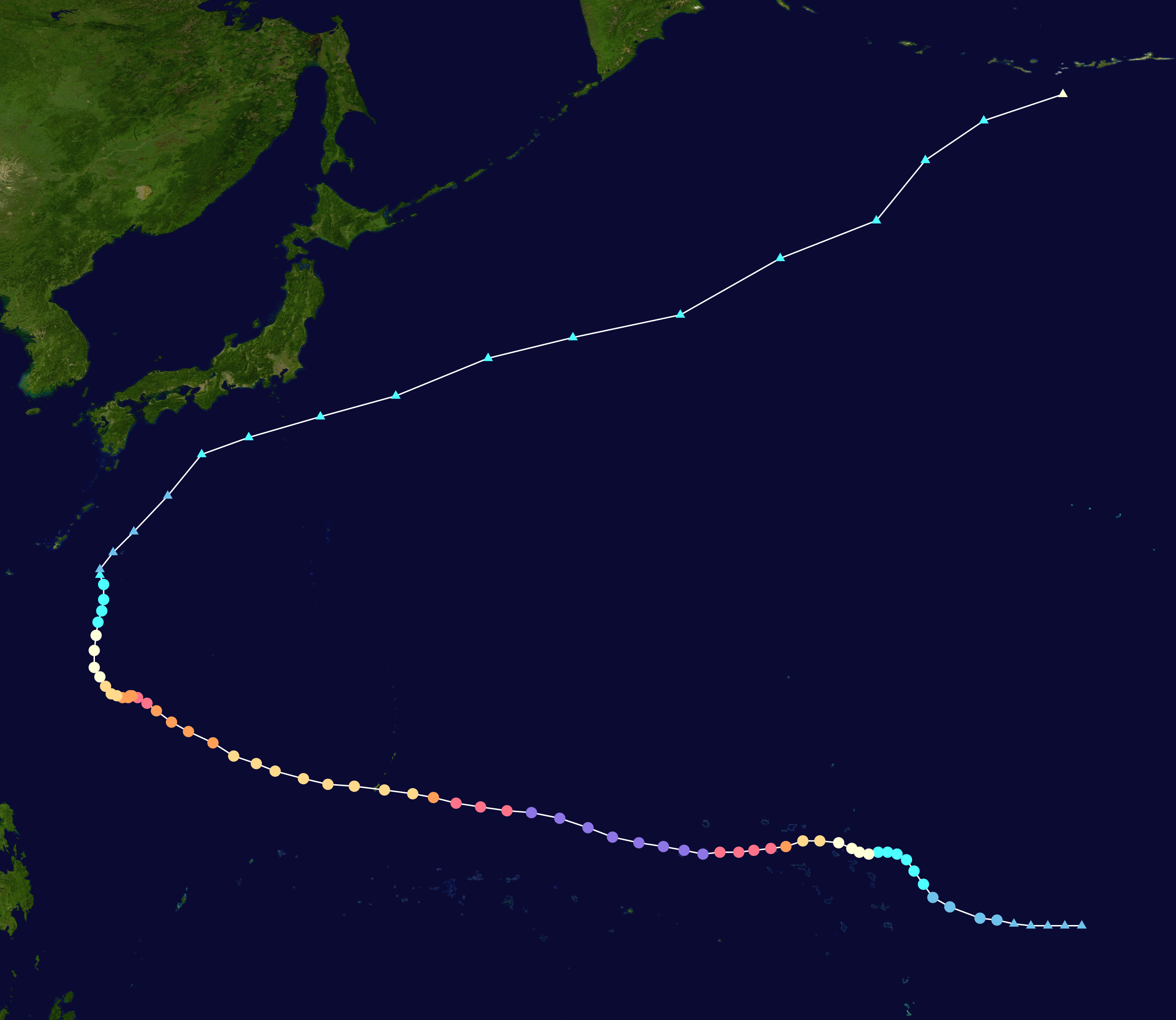
Map plotting the storm's track and intensity, according to the Saffir–Simpson scale Map key Saffir–Simpson scale Tropical depression (≤38 mph, ≤62 km/h) Tropical storm (39–73 mph, 63–118 km/h) Category 1 (74–95 mph, 119–153 km/h) Category 2 (96–110 mph, 154–177 km/h) Category 3 (111–129 mph, 178–208 km/h) Category 4 (130–156 mph, 209–251 km/h) Category 5 (≥157 mph, ≥252 km/h) Unknown Storm type Tropical cyclone Subtropical cyclone Extratropical cyclone, remnant low, tropical disturbance, or monsoon depression

The origins of Typhoon Gay were from a tropical disturbance east of the International Date Line along a monsoon trough that extended west to the South China Sea in mid-November 1992. The same trough had earlier spawned Tropical Storm Forrest and would later create Typhoon Hunt. The tropical disturbance moved westward across the dateline and gradually became better organized with increased convection. On November 14, the Joint Typhoon Warning Center (JTWC) (Note: The Joint Typhoon Warning Center is a joint United States Navy – United States Air Force task force that issues tropical cyclone warnings for the western Pacific Ocean and other regions.) issued a Tropical Cyclone Formation Alert. At 1800 UTC that day, the agency initiated advisories on Tropical Depression 31W, located to the east of the Marshall Islands. The Japan Meteorological Agency (JMA) (Note: The Japan Meteorological Agency is the official Regional Specialized Meteorological Center for the western Pacific Ocean.) also assessed that the depression had developed by that time. The next day, the depression intensified into Tropical Storm Gay.

For most of Typhoon Gay's existence, a strong anticyclone to its north steered the storm to the west or west-northwest. The JTWC upgraded the storm to typhoon status early on November 17, and the JMA followed suit the next day. Gay first affected Mejit Island and eventually crossed the central portion of the Marshall Islands. Owing to favorable sea surface temperatures and upper-level wind patterns, the storm entered a phase of rapid deepening similar to other November typhoons near that location. On November 19, the JTWC upgraded Gay to a super typhoon, which is a typhoon with 1-minute sustained winds of 240 km/h (150 mph). Gradual intensification ensued, and based on satellite estimates, the JTWC estimated that Typhoon Gay attained peak winds of 295 km/h (183 mph) at 0000 UTC on November 21. The agency also estimated that the typhoon reached a minimum barometric pressure of 872 mb (25.8 inHg), which would have made Gay the most intense typhoon since Typhoon Tip in 1979, tying with Hurricane Patricia in 2015 for the second-strongest tropical cyclone worldwide. At the same time, the JMA estimated peak 10-minute sustained winds of 205 km/h (127 mph), with a pressure of 900 mbar (27 inHg).

After Gay attained its peak intensity, outflow from Typhoon Hunt to its northwest increased the wind shear over the typhoon. The wind shear deteriorated Gay's northern eyewall, causing the typhoon to weaken. In the 24 hours after Gay reached its peak intensity, the JTWC estimated that the winds had decreased by 65 km/h (40 mph) to below super typhoon status; such rapid weakening is uncommon for a storm over open waters. Tropical cyclone forecast models had anticipated Gay to make a turn to the north and northeast, but it maintained a west-northwest track toward Guam. Despite weakening steadily, the typhoon maintained a large size with a wind diameter of 1,480 km (920 mi). Around 0000 UTC on November 23, Gay made landfall on Guam, becoming the third typhoon in three months to strike the island—the others were Typhoon Omar in August and Typhoon Brian in October. Both the JTWC and the JMA estimated the typhoon to have had winds of 160 km/h (99 mph) at landfall. The influence from Typhoon Hunt diminished after Gay affected Guam, allowing it to begin restrengthening. Late on November 25, the JTWC estimated that the typhoon attained a secondary peak intensity of 215 km/h (134 mph). Gay subsequently slowed while moving along the western periphery of the subtropical ridge, and it turned north while gradually weakening. On November 28, the JMA downgraded Gay to a tropical storm, and the JTWC followed suit the next day. The JMA assessed that Gay became an extratropical cyclone at 0000 UTC on November 30; however, the JTWC continued issuing advisories until December 1, making it the longest-lasting typhoon of the season with 63 advisories. The remnant of Gay accelerated and turned to the northeast, passing to the southeast of Japan and crossing the International Date Line.

== Preparations and impact ==
=== Marshall Islands ===
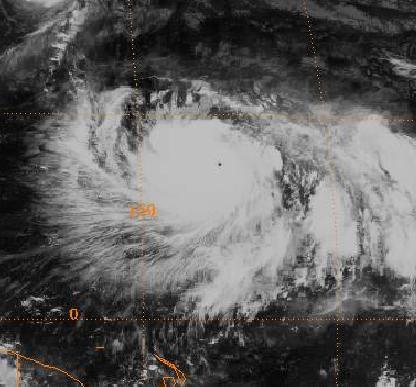
Satellite image of Gay at peak intensity

Typhoon Gay first affected the Marshall Islands, striking several atolls in the archipelago with typhoon-force winds. On Mejit Island, the first island to be affected, the typhoon destroyed every wooden structure and left most of the islanders homeless. High winds downed all of the island's trees and destroyed 75% of the crops. Nearby, Ailuk Atoll experienced similar winds, though house damage was minor despite similar crop losses. The large wind field extended to the south, affecting Maloelap and Aur atolls with winds that damaged 30% of the houses and crops. Further south, the Marshall Islands capital city of Majuro experienced lightning strikes from the typhoon, which caused an island-wide power outage and cuts to the water supply and radio communication. Debris from the storm closed the Marshall Islands International Airport for two days. On Ujae Atoll, the typhoon destroyed an automated meteorological observing station that had been installed in 1989. The typhoon left over 5,000 people homeless across the country, but there were no native deaths and only one injury in the archipelago owing to well-executed warnings and preparations. However, large waves from the typhoon sank a boat in a small lagoon, killing one of the boat's two sailors.

=== Guam and Northern Marianas ===
After affecting the Marshall Islands, Gay tracked toward Guam and became the fifth typhoon to come within 110 km (68 mi) of the island in six months. Extensive preparations were made, including the sending of ships to mitigate damage and flying United States Air Force planes to other bases in the region. The schools, government buildings, airport, and port were closed, and about 4,300 people evacuated to storm shelters. Further north, 1,639 people evacuated to storm shelters on Saipan, which set the record for the most storm evacuees at the time.

Despite weakening greatly from its peak intensity, Gay struck Guam with sustained winds of 160 km/h (99 mph), with gusts to 195 km/h (121 mph) on Nimitz Hill. The winds were strong enough to disrupt power and water utilities, as well as destroy a few houses. As a result of its weakening, Gay had a disrupted inner-core with little precipitation, which prompted the JTWC to label it as a "dry typhoon"; rainfall totals on the island ranged from only 40–90 mm (1.6–3.5 in). Despite the extreme winds, little wind-thrown trees or snapped branches were observed. The combination of the winds and light rainfall, however, sprayed saltwater over the island's vegetation, leading to near island-wide loss of leaves. Majority of the local dicots withered and lost their leaves within two days after the storm, while other plants such as palms, cycads and gymnosperms retained their foliage but turned brown. The defoliation led to significant losses for crop farmers; in some locations, the crops did not recover for four years. Along the east coast of Guam, Gay produced a storm surge of 1.2–1.8 m (3.9–5.9 ft). The surge reached 3.4 m (11 ft) on Cabras Island in northern Guam, washing sand and water onto coastal roads and breaking a boat from its moorings. The JTWC estimated that damage would have been worse had Typhoon Omar not destroyed the weaker structures three months earlier; little additional damage occurred to the island's capital of Hagåtña. The typhoon destroyed four iron roofs on Tinian Island, located north of Guam. On Saipan to its north, the storm surge destroyed one house and threatened the foundation of several others; twelve families required rescue by emergency workers. The storm caused power outages, and one house sustained fire damage due to candles and kerosene lamps.

=== Japan ===
While Gay was becoming extratropical, Okinawa Prefecture experienced heavy rainfall. The highest total was 322 mm (12.7 in), and one station recorded 27 mm (1.1 in) in a ten-minute period. The rains flooded four buildings and inundated crop fields. Rough winds with gusts peaking at 82 km/h (51 mph) caused isolated power outages and the cancellation of two airline flights.

== Aftermath ==
Marshall Islands president Amata Kabua declared nine islands as disaster areas. United States president George H. W. Bush also declared the Marshall Islands a disaster area on December 16. Despite being an independent nation, the Marshall Islands were eligible to the same funding from the Federal Emergency Management Agency as a U.S. state or territory. The United States provided a loan of $508,245 (1994 USD) for emergency assistance and to train locals to mitigate future events. After the storm, workers near Majuro planted seeds to regrow the damaged crops.

The rapid succession of typhoons in 1992 caused a significant drop in tourism in Guam. During typhoons Omar and Gay, there was little communication between residents on the island. As a result, the Guam Communications Network was created to facilitate future relief efforts during storms.

A research paper published ten years after the storm suggested that Gay could have been stronger than Typhoon Tip, which attained the lowest barometric pressure ever recorded. While at its peak intensity, Gay registered a rating of 8.0 for nine consecutive hours using the Dvorak technique, indicating sustained wind speeds of at least (315 km/h (196 mph). In addition, the cyclone had a significantly colder band of clouds around the eye. Typhoon Angela in 1995 presented similar features and could have been stronger than Gay. Neither of the two had direct observations into their eyes, however, making it impossible to confirm such intensity.

== See also ==
- Other storms named Gay
- Typhoon Angela
