= Typhoon Keith =

Pacific typhoon in 1997

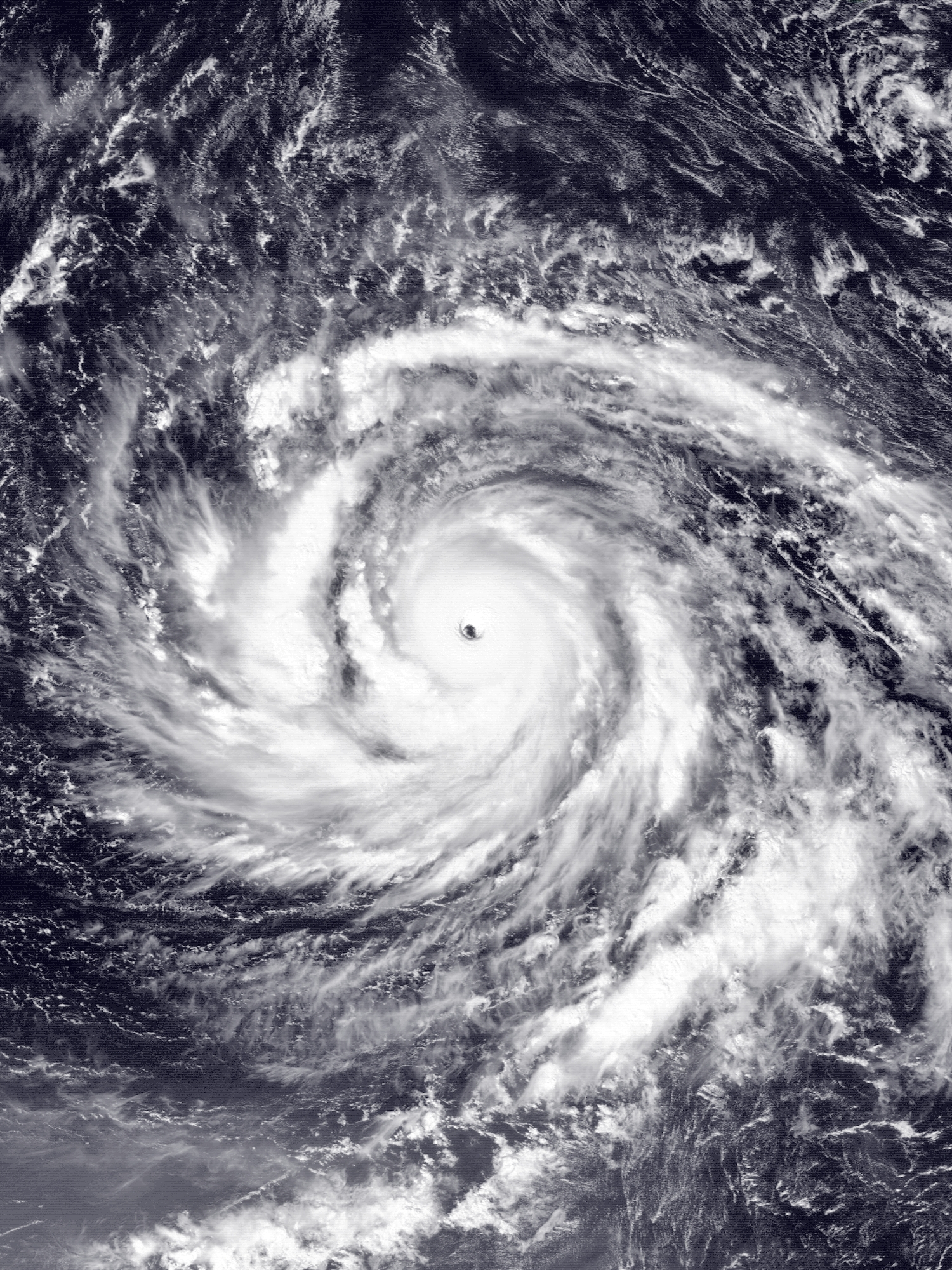
- Typhoon Keith at peak intensity on November 1 as it neared the Northern Mariana Islands

Meteorological history
- Formed: October 26, 1997
- Extratropical: November 8, 1997
- Dissipated: November 11, 1997

Violent typhoon
- 10-minute sustained (JMA)
- Highest winds: 205 km/h (125 mph)
- Lowest pressure: 910 hPa (mbar); 26.87 inHg

Category 5-equivalent super typhoon
- 1-minute sustained (SSHWS/JTWC)
- Highest winds: 285 km/h (180 mph)
- Lowest pressure: 878 hPa (mbar); 25.93 inHg

Overall effects
- Fatalities: 1 total
- Damage: $15 million
- Areas affected: Japan, Northern Mariana Islands and Guam
- IBTrACS
- Part of the 1997 Pacific typhoon season

Typhoon Keith was an extremely powerful tropical cyclone and the tenth of a record eleven super typhoons to develop during the unusually intense 1997 Pacific typhoon season. Originating from a near-equatorial trough on October 26, the precursor depression to Keith slowly organized into a tropical storm. After two days of gradual strengthening, the storm underwent a period of rapid intensification on October 30 as winds increased to 195 km/h (121 mph). On November 1, the storm further intensified into a super typhoon and later attained peak winds of 285 km/h (177 mph). The following day, the powerful storm passed between Rota and Tinian in the Northern Mariana Islands. After fluctuating in strength over the following few days, a steady weakening trend established itself by November 5 as the typhoon accelerated towards the northeast. On October 8, Keith transitioned into an extratropical cyclone and was last noted early the following day near the International Dateline.

Despite Typhoon Keith's close passage to the islands of Rota and Tinian as a powerful storm, neither island received sustained winds over 160 km/h (99 mph). However, these winds resulted in significant damage across the island chain. More than 800 homes were damaged or destroyed by the storm and losses amounted to $15 million (1997 USD). There were no reports of fatalities in relation to the storm; however, one person was injured.

== Meteorological history ==
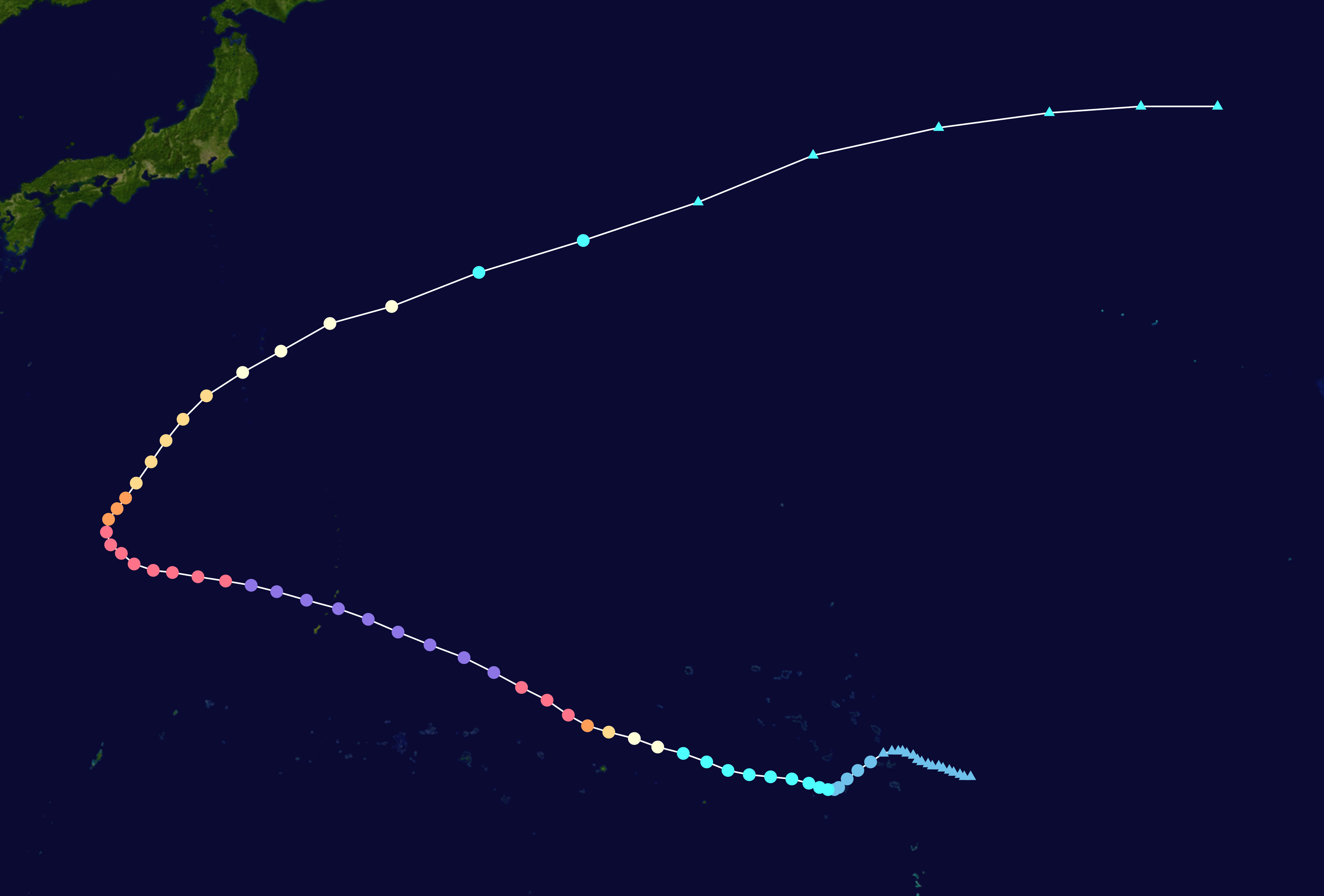
Map plotting the storm's track and intensity, according to the Saffir–Simpson scale Map key Saffir–Simpson scale Tropical depression (≤38 mph, ≤62 km/h) Tropical storm (39–73 mph, 63–118 km/h) Category 1 (74–95 mph, 119–153 km/h) Category 2 (96–110 mph, 154–177 km/h) Category 3 (111–129 mph, 178–208 km/h) Category 4 (130–156 mph, 209–251 km/h) Category 5 (≥157 mph, ≥252 km/h) Unknown Storm type Tropical cyclone Subtropical cyclone Extratropical cyclone, remnant low, tropical disturbance, or monsoon depression

Typhoon Keith originated during the third week of October 1997 from a near-equatorial trough near the Marshall Islands. Along with its Southern Hemisphere twin, convection persisted around a weak low-level circulation, beginning on October 18. Slowly tracking westward, the system remained fairly disorganized before conditions allowed it to develop. By October 26, convection consolidated around the center of circulation and symmetrical outflow became established over the storm. Later that day, the JTWC issued a Tropical Cyclone Formation Alert (TCFA) for the system as they anticipated development into a tropical cyclone. Hours later, the Japan Meteorological Agency (JMA) began monitoring the system as a tropical depression. Despite favorable conditions, the low initially failed to develop further, prompting the issuance of a second TCFA on October 27. Later that day, the JTWC issued their first advisory on the depression, classifying it as 29W.

Early on October 28, the depression intensified into a tropical storm, at which time it was named Keith by the JTWC. Tracking west-northwestward in response to a subtropical ridge, the storm slowly intensified at roughly half the rate initially forecast. However, on October 30, the storm suddenly underwent a period of rapid intensification, with sustained winds increasing from 100 to 195 km/h (62 to 121 mph) in a 24-hour span. Additionally, the barometric pressure decreased by 43 mbar (hPa; 1.27 inHg) during this time. Throughout the following day, the typhoon continued to intensify, becoming a super typhoon – a storm with winds of at least 240 km/h (150 mph) – late on October 31. Later, the system attained its peak winds of 285 km/h (177 mph) and an estimated pressure of 878 mbar (878 hPa; 25.9 inHg). According to the JMA, however, Keith's peak ten-minute sustained winds were 205 km/h (127 mph) and the pressure was 910 mbar (910 hPa; 27 inHg).

Maintaining super typhoon status, Keith moved through the Northern Mariana Islands between 0600–1200 UTC on November 2 with winds of 260 km/h (160 mph). The center of the typhoon moved between the islands of Rota and Tinian; however, it was discovered that the storm had a very compact field of intense hurricane-force winds, estimated to be 55 km (34 mi) across. After moving through the islands, Keith briefly weakened below super typhoon status on November 3 as the eye became partially obscured due to an eyewall replacement cyclone. However, it re-attained winds of 250 km/h (160 mph) the following day as it began to turn towards the north and later northeast. Once the storm completed its turn, Keith accelerated and steadily weakened as it entered the westerly flow north of the ridge previously steering it westward. Early on November 8, the storm transitioned into an extratropical cyclone as it was downgraded to a tropical storm. The extratropical remnants of Keith were last noted by the JMA on October 9 near the International Dateline.

== Impact ==
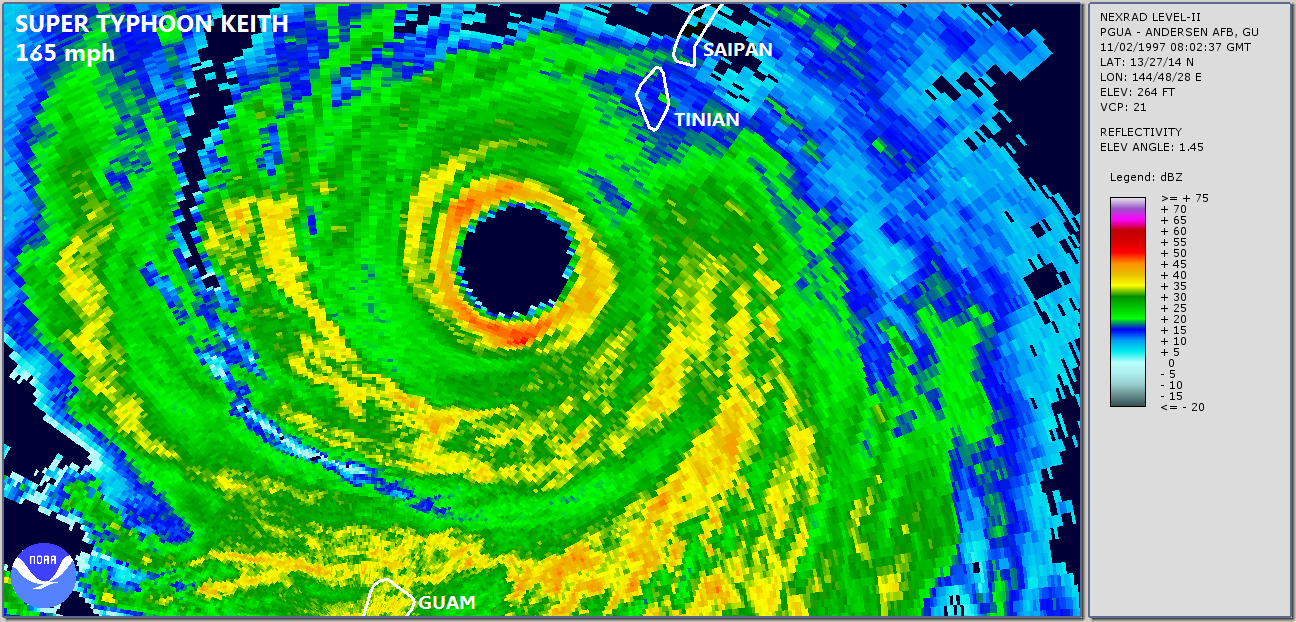
Radar image from Guam showing Typhoon Keith at its closest approach to the Mariana Islands

Prior to the storm's arrival, more than 1,000 residents evacuated to storm shelters set up in the Northern Marianas Islands. Women who were more than seven months pregnant were also urged to check into hospitals, as doctors warned that changes in pressure could trigger labor.

On November 2, Typhoon Keith passed through the 95 km (59 mi) wide channel between Rota and Tinian. Despite the storm's close passage between both islands, the maximum sustained winds above 115 mph (185 km/h) did not extend far enough out to reach either island. However, maximum sustained winds on Saipan were 158 km/h (98 mph) with gust to 175 km/h (109 mph). On Rota, winds reached 93 km/h (58 mph) with gust to 130 km/h (81 mph). On Tinian winds reached 111 km/h (69 mph) with gust to 130 km/h (81 mph). The strongest winds reported across Guam were 66 km/h (41 mph) with gust to 101 km/h (63 mph).

Across the Northern Mariana Islands, more than 800 homes were damaged or destroyed and power was lost to most of the islands, leaving roughly 25,000 people without electricity. Most of the damage took place on Saipan, where 130 homes were destroyed, 436 had major damage, and 226 others received minor damage. On Rota, 24 homes were destroyed and 156 others were damaged to varying degrees. Despite the severity of damage, there were no reports of loss of life and only one injury in relation to the typhoon. Throughout the Northern Mariana Islands, monetary losses from Keith amounted to $15 million (1997 USD).

In the wake of the typhoon, President Bill Clinton declared the Mariana Islands as a disaster area, allowing the affected islands to receive government aid. Red Cross workers were deployed to the islands to assist with relief efforts days after the storm. Typhoon Keith was one of 23 events in the United States during the 1997-98 El Niño event which warranted federal aid; combined, the disasters cost $289.1 million, of which $5,813,784 was attributed to Keith.

In Japan, one person was killed in a high wave by Keith.

== See also ==
- Typhoon Isa
- Typhoon Joan (1997)
- Typhoon Dolphin (2015)
- Typhoon Lekima (2013)
