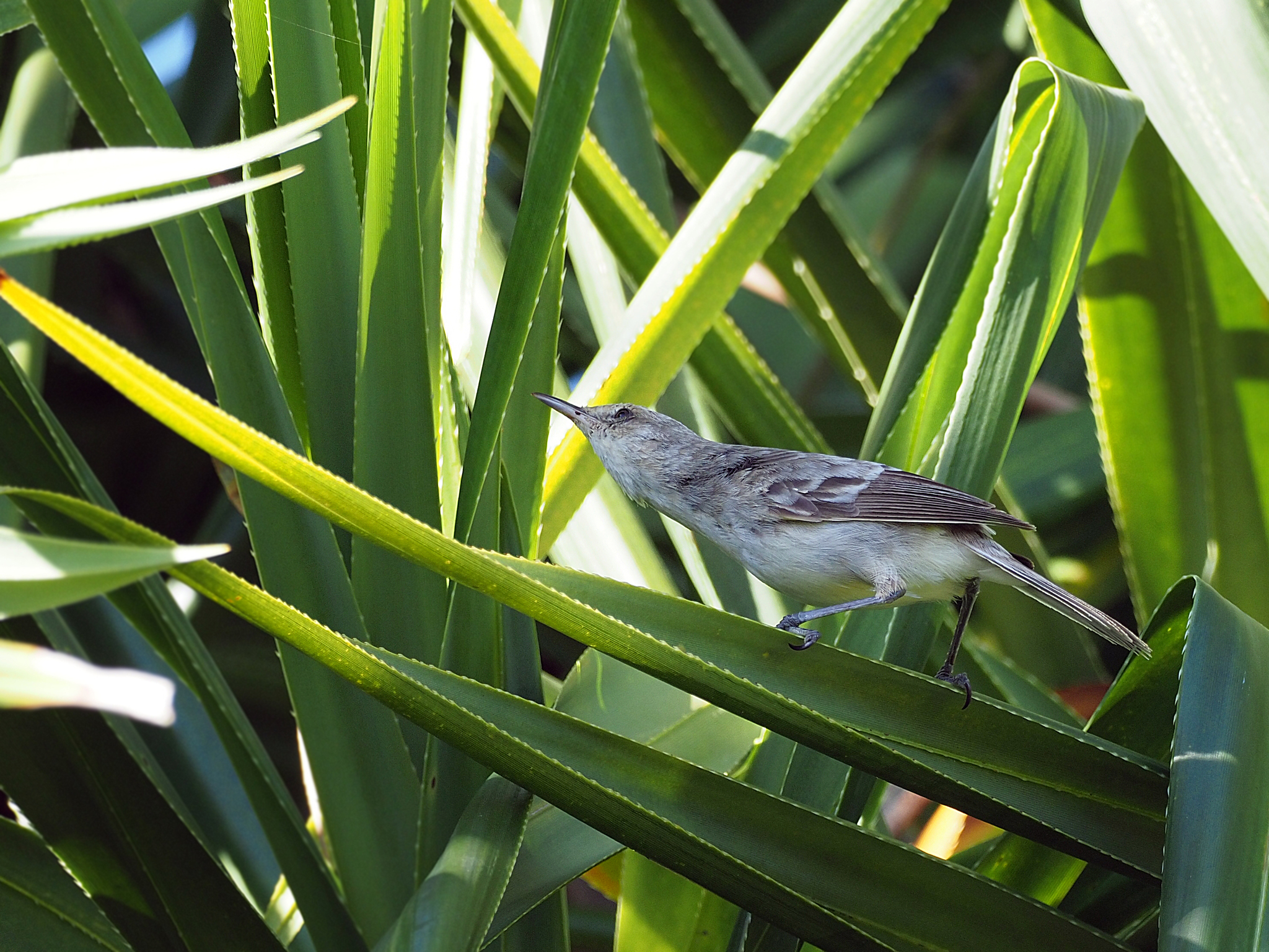

Conservation status
- Vulnerable (IUCN 3.1)

Scientific classification
- Kingdom: Animalia
- Phylum: Chordata
- Class: Aves
- Order: Passeriformes
- Family: Acrocephalidae
- Genus: Acrocephalus
- Species: A. taiti

Binomial name
- Acrocephalus taiti Ogilvie-Grant, 1913
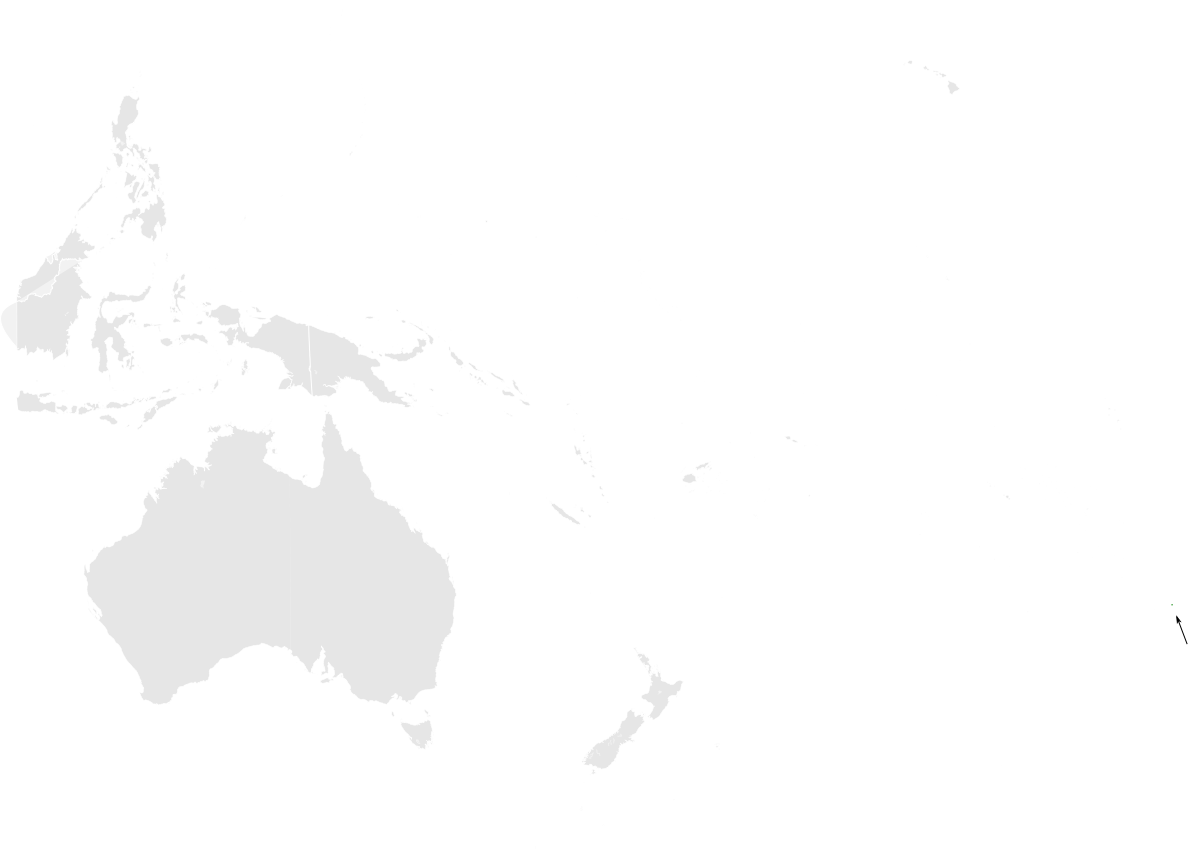

= Henderson reed warbler =

Species of bird

The Henderson reed warbler (Acrocephalus taiti), also known as the Henderson reed-warbler or the Henderson Island reed warbler, is a species of Old World warbler in the family Acrocephalidae. It is found only on Henderson Island, part of the Pitcairn Islands. Its natural habitat is subtropical or tropical dry forests. It is threatened by habitat loss.

== Taxonomy ==
The Henderson reed warbler was described as Acrocephalus taiti by the Scottish ornithologist William Robert Ogilvie-Grant in 1913 on the basis of specimens collected from Henderson Island. Historically, the species was treated as being conspecific with the Pitcairn reed warbler, Rimatara reed warbler, and Cook reed warbler based on morphological similarities between the species. In 1992, the American ornithologist Gary Graves split the taxa into distinct species, citing differences in the pattern of leucistic plumage between the species.

The name of the genus is derived from the Ancient Greek akros meaning 'topmost, highest', and kephalē, meaning 'head'. The species is named after David R. Tait, a collector who worked on Henderson Island. Henderson reed warbler is the official common name designated by the International Ornithologists' Union (IOU); the species is also known as the Henderson Island warbler.

A 2011 study of mitochondrial DNA found the Henderson reed warbler to be part of a group of Acrocephalus found only in eastern Polynesia. Within this group, it was sister to the Pitcairn reed warbler. These two species were basal within the group and sister to all the other species in the radiation, including the Rimatara reed warbler.

== Description ==
The Henderson reed warbler is a large, short-billed warbler, with an average length of 17 cm (6.7 in). Males weigh 22.5–30.5 g (0.79–1.08 oz) on average and females weigh 21–25 g (0.74–0.88 oz) on average. The head is white, with a blotched olive-brown and white crown and a dark eyestripe. The upperparts are olive-brown, while the underparts are white with a light yellow wash. The wing feathers have pale borders, and some wing feathers can be entirely white. The distribution and extent of leucistic patches on the body is variable and some birds can be almost entirely white. The iris is brown, although it can appear blackish. The bill is short and somewhat decurved. The upper mandible is dark grayish brown, while the lower mandible is dark-tipped silvery-pink. Some adults have wholly dark bills. The gape and inside of the mouth are light pink. The long legs and large feet are slate to blackish in adults, occasionally with a dark blue tint. Immature birds may have a stronger blue wash to their feet, but the reliability of this characteristic is unclear.

Males typically have more white feathers than females, while juveniles have fewer white feathers than adults. The Henderson reed warbler is very similar-looking to the Pitcairn and Rimatara reed warblers, but the ranges of these species are hundreds of miles apart and do not overlap. They also differ in their patterns of leucism; Henderson reed warblers typically have leucistic patterns on their upperparts, secondaries, and rectrices, unlike Pitcairn reed warblers (primaries, secondaries, and rectrices) and Rimatara reed warblers (across the entire body).

=== Vocalisations ===
The warbler's calls include a monotonous chirp, a short (<0.13 s) high-pitched note (4–8 kHz), and a series of thin notes and chirps one to five seconds long. The last of these sounds similar to a song, but it is not known if this species sings.

== Distribution and habitat ==
The Henderson reed warbler is endemic to Henderson Island in the Pitcairn Islands. It is a sedentary generalist species that inhabits forest and scrub habitats across the whole island. In coastal areas, it inhabits coconut groves and patches of dense scrub, as well as coastal woodland with Cordia subcordata, Thespesia populnea, coconut trees, and Tournefortia argentea. In the interior, it inhabits low undisturbed forests with dense understoreys. The forests are characterised by species such as Pisonia grandis, Pandanus tectorius, and Xylosma suaveolens.

== Behaviour and ecology ==
The Henderson reed warbler feeds on a variety of insects, such as moths, ants, wasps, flies, cockroaches, beetles, and butterflies, as well as snails and fruit. Caterpillars might be an important food source for nestlings. Foraging takes place at all levels in the forest and involves picking food items from vegetation and off the ground.
