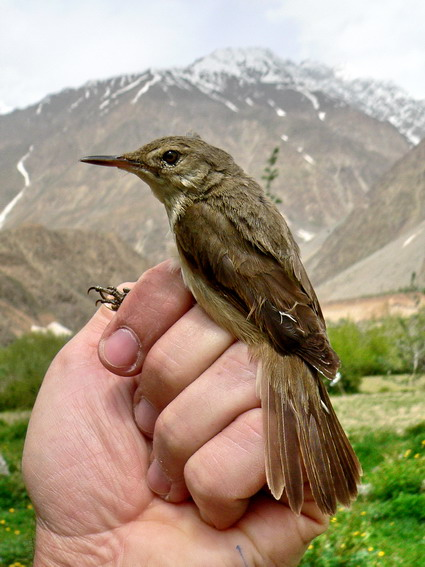
- An adult large-billed reed warbler caught at breeding grounds in the Pamir Mountains, Tajikistan

Conservation status
- Least Concern (IUCN 3.1)

Scientific classification
- Kingdom: Animalia
- Phylum: Chordata
- Class: Aves
- Order: Passeriformes
- Family: Acrocephalidae
- Genus: Acrocephalus
- Species: A. orinus

Binomial name
- Acrocephalus orinus Oberholser, 1905
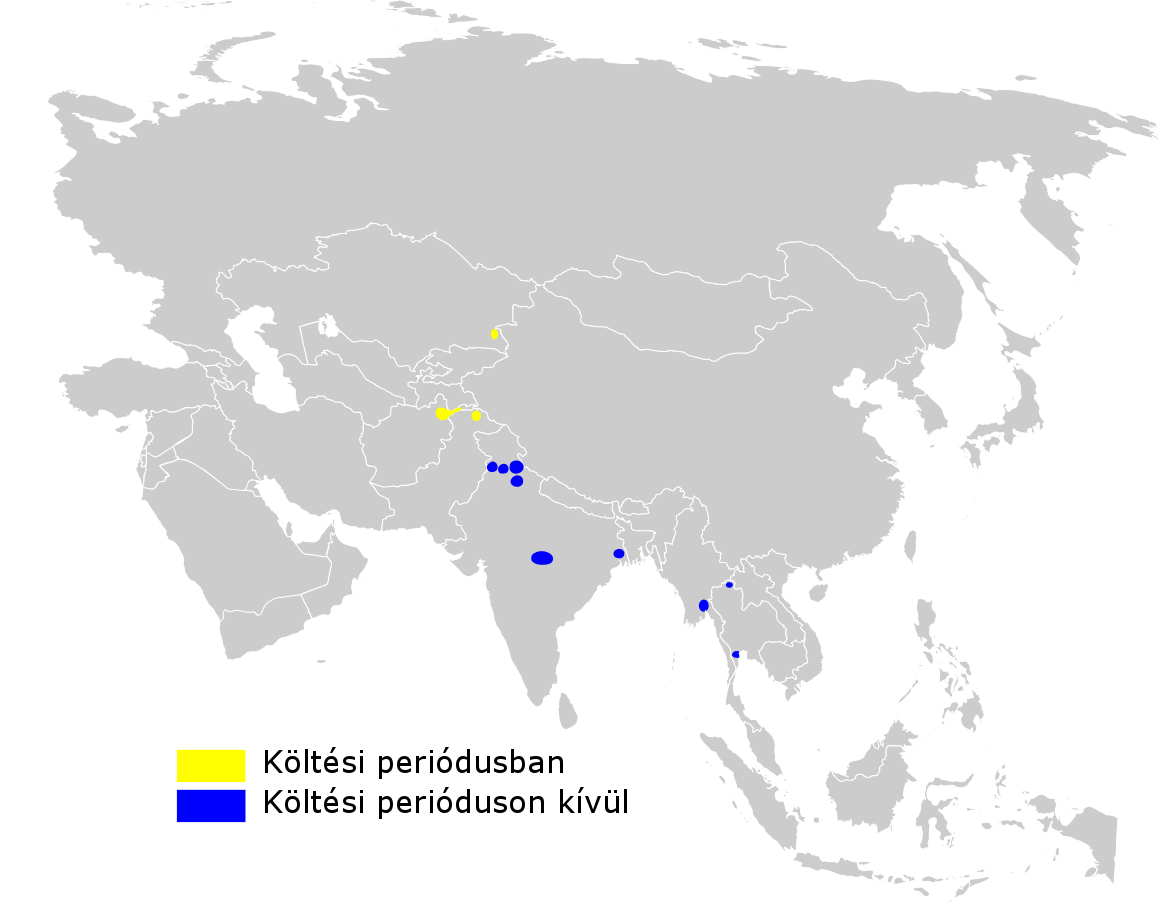
- Distribution of Large-billed Reed Warbler Breeding Non-breeding

= Large-billed reed warbler =

Species of bird

The large-billed reed warbler (Acrocephalus orinus) is an Old World warbler in the genus Acrocephalus. The species has been dubbed as "the world's least known bird". It was known from a single specimen collected in India in 1867 and rediscovered in the wild in Thailand in 2006. The identity of the bird caught in Thailand was established by matching DNA sequences extracted from feathers; the bird was released. After the rediscovery in the wild a second specimen was discovered amid Acrocephalus dumetorum specimens in the collections of the Natural History Museum at Tring. A breeding area was found in Afghanistan in 2009 and studies in 2011 pointed to its breeding in Kazakhstan and Tajikistan. One bird was found in the Baikka Wetland in Srimangal, Bangladesh on 7 December 2011.

== Description ==
Primary tip shape

This species has the upper plumage and visible portions of wings and tail olive-brown while the underside is pale creamy with the underwing and axillaries paler.

The length is about 5 in (130 mm) with the tail being 2.3 in (58 mm) and the wing 2.4 in (61 mm) long. The tarsus is 0.85 in (22 mm) while the bill from gape is 0.8 in (20 mm). The first primary measures 0.35 in (8.9 mm) while the second is intermediate in length between the ninth and tenth. The closed tail appears graduated with the difference between the longest and shortest feathers being 0.4 in (10 mm). The type specimen was obtained in the Sutlej valley ("Sukedje valley") not far from Rampur.

The upper mandible is dark, but the cutting edges and entire lower mandible are pale. The tarsi, toes and claws appear pale brown. The hind claw is longer than in A. dumetorum. The tips of the tail feathers are pointed and more acutely lanceolate than in A. dumetorum or A. concinens. The primary tips are broad and rather squarer. Recent observers note that it has a habit of fanning out its tail open as it forages.

The specimens from Afghanistan and Kazakhstan suggest that they breed in Central Asia and moult indicates that they migrate along the Himalayas to winter in northern India and Southeast Asia. Sequence variation points to a stable or shrinking population structure.

== History ==
It was first collected by Allan Octavian Hume in the Sutlej Valley near Rampur, Himachal Pradesh, India on 13 November 1867. This specimen (BMNH registration no. 1886.7.8. 1742) was first provisionally described as Phyllopneuste macrorhyncha (Hume, 1869) but the name was changed two years later to Acrocephalus macrorhynchus (Hume, 1871). H C Oberholser, however, pointed out in 1905 that this was unacceptable because a specimen from Egypt described by von Müller in 1853 as Calamoherpe macrorhyncha turned out to be Acrocephalus stentoreus; Acrocephalus macrorhynchus was abandoned in favour of A. orinus. The identity of the species was in question and until 2002 was considered as a synonym of the clamorous reed warbler (A. stentoreus). Some others considered it an aberrant Blyth's reed warbler. A recent re-check of the morphology and the mtDNA suggested that it was a distinct species. An additional ten new specimens in collections were identified in 2008. These included specimens collected by John Biddulph from Gilgit and W N Koelz from Zebak.

== Rediscovery ==
On 27 March 2006 a living specimen was caught at the Laem Phak Bia Environmental Research and Development Project in Phetchaburi, Thailand by ornithologist Philip Round of Mahidol University. The bird was ringed and two feathers were extracted; DNA from them was found to match the DNA of the 1867 specimen.

Based on the short and rounded wings, earlier studies had suggested that the species was likely to be a short-distant migrant or a resident. The rediscoveries of a second museum specimen from a different location and the wild specimen from Thailand suggest that this may not be so.

Some field identifications from West Bengal and central India were subsequently reported based on behaviour, but captured specimens did not appear to match the species.

A breeding site of the large-billed reed warbler, Acrocephalus orinus, was discovered in the Wakhan Corridor of the Pamir of north-eastern Afghanistan by researcher Robert Timmins of the Wildlife Conservation Society, who was studying avian communities in the Pamir Mountains. He came across a small brown warbler and recorded its song. Dr. Timmins did not realize the importance of his discovery until he visited a Natural History Museum in Tring, England. There he examined a specimen of a large-billed reed warbler, which looked identical to the bird he had seen and recorded.

A team of ornithologists, including Afghan scientists of the Wildlife Conservation Society, confirmed his discovery by capturing, sampling and releasing almost 20 specimens of the bird in 2009, the largest number ever recorded, using a combination of field observations, museum specimens, DNA sequencing, and also the first known audio recording of the species that were already made in 2008.

A study by Russian ornithologists in 2011 indicated that the species had been misidentified as A. dumetorum in museum collections and that the species may be breeding in Tajikistan, Kyrgyzstan, eastern Uzbekistan and south-eastern Kazakhstan. Nests were found in 2011 in the Panj river valley, Tajikistan.
