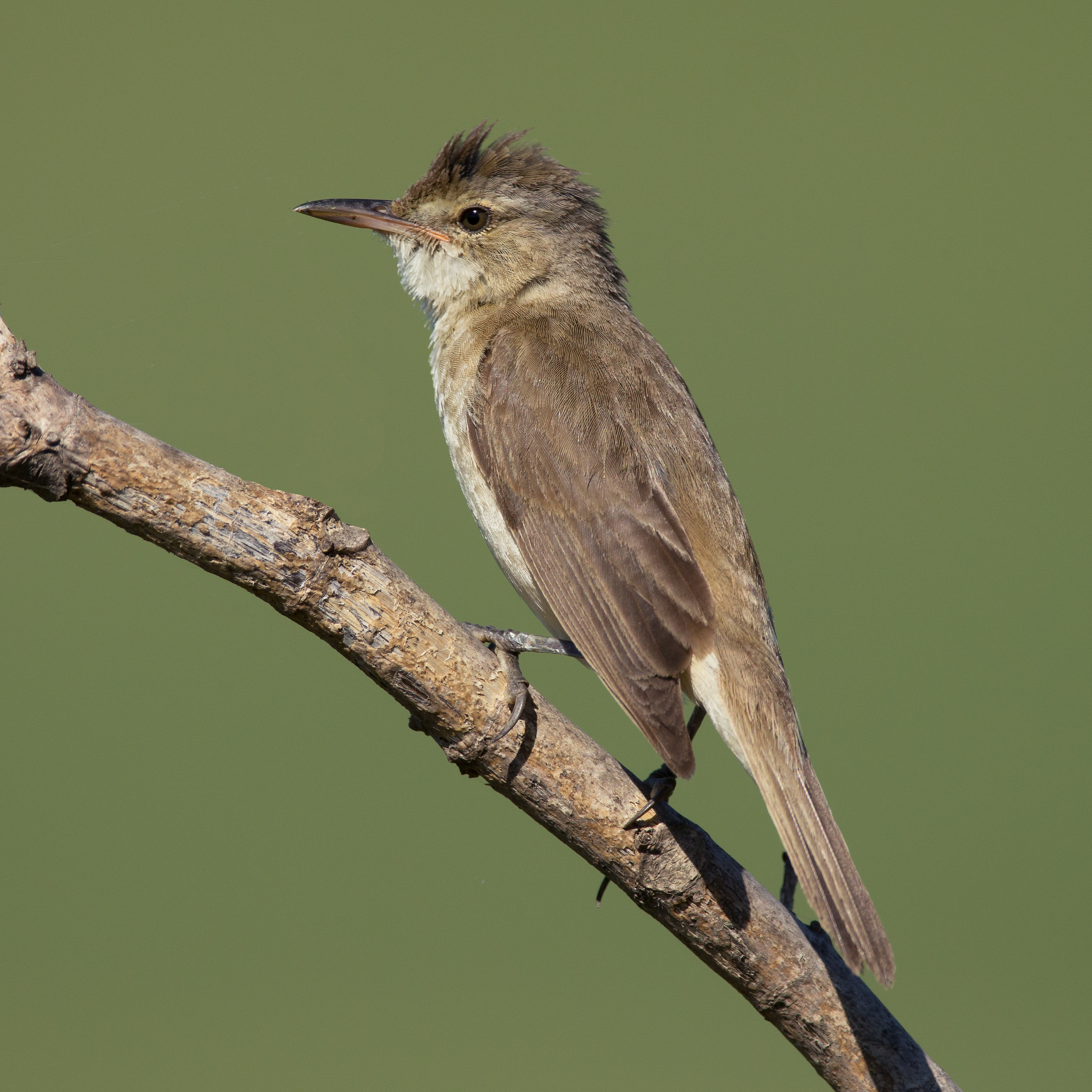
- At Bushell's Lagoon, New South Wales, Australia

Conservation status
- Least Concern (IUCN 3.1)

Scientific classification
- Kingdom: Animalia
- Phylum: Chordata
- Class: Aves
- Order: Passeriformes
- Family: Acrocephalidae
- Genus: Acrocephalus
- Species: A. australis

Binomial name
- Acrocephalus australis (Gould, 1838)
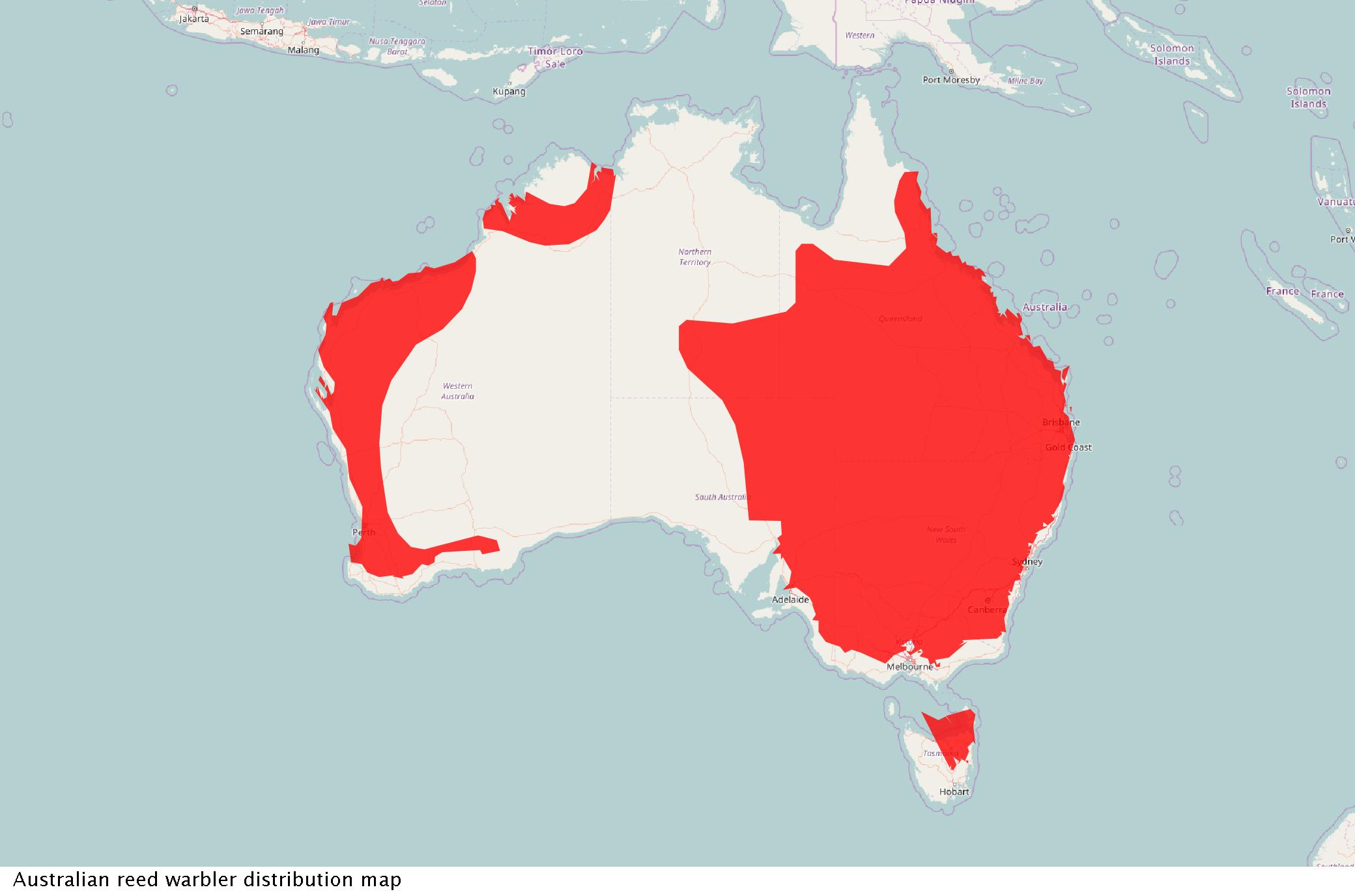
- Distribution of Australian reed warbler (Acrocephalus australis) shown in red

= Australian reed warbler =

Species of bird

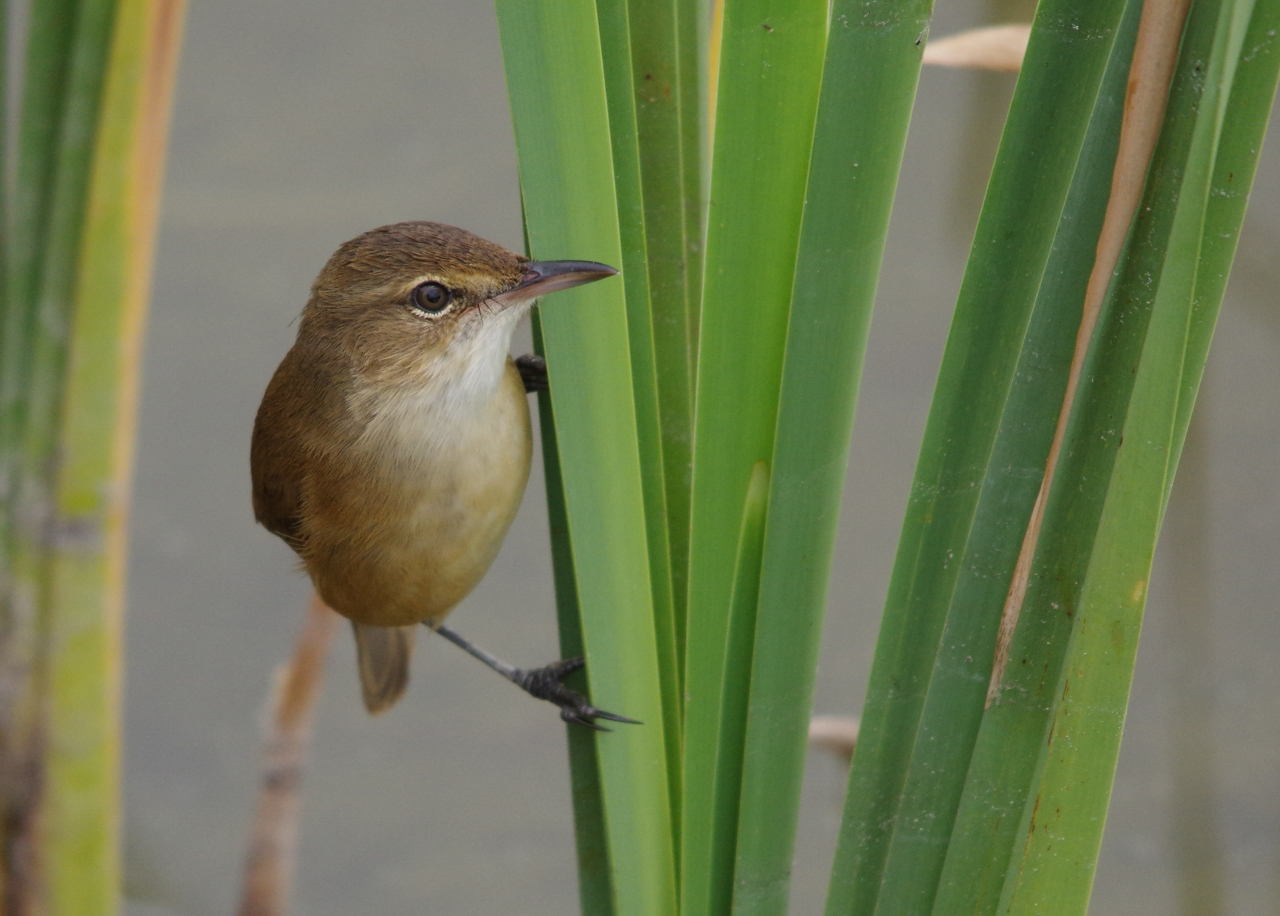
Australian reed warbler perched on reeds

The Australian reed warbler (Acrocephalus australis) is an acrocephalid warbler in the genus Acrocephalus and is the only Acrocephalus species native to Australia. It has also been observed in Papua New Guinea and nearby islands. The name Acrocephalus refers to the peaked crown found on reed warblers in this genus and can be translated to mean "topmost head" in Greek. The species name australis is translated to mean "southern" in Latin, and refers to the species range, Australia. In its western range the Australian reed warbler is also known as "Koordjikotji" (pronounced core'chee'caw'chee) in the local Aboriginal language of Perth and its surrounds.

== Taxonomy and evolution ==
Formerly placed in the then "wastebasket" family Sylviidae, the genus Acrocephalus is now included in the family Acrocephalidae, which encompasses 60 species in 7 genera widespread across Africa, Europe, Asia and the western Pacific regions. Within the Acrocephalidae, the Australian reed warbler is recognised as belonging to a monophyletic group consisting of Palearctic and Australasian region species. However, recent mitochondrial DNA analysis infers that pacific Acrocephalus warblers can be divided into two main clades; Micronesian (except Guam), two Polynesian, southern Marquesas and Australian species in one clade, and remaining Polynesian taxa in the other clade. This analysis results in dividing the main Pacific group into a Micronesian group and a Polynesian group. The closest relative of the Australian reed warbler was previously recognised as the Pitcairn reed warbler (Acrocephalus vaughani), endemic to South Polynesia. Most recent phylogenetic analysis, however, finds the closest relative to the Australian reed warbler is the Caroline reed warbler (Acrocephalus syrinx).

=== Subspecies ===
There are two recognised subspecies:

- Acrocephalus australis australis Gould, 1838 - East and Southeast Australia including Tasmania (nominate race, see detailed description following).
- Acrocephalus australis gouldi J.C. Dubois, 1901 – North and Southwest Australia (darker plumage on upper and under body parts, the bill is longer, stouter and less decurved and the overall body size is slightly larger).

== Description and field identification ==
This species appears long (15–18 cm), slender and plain, with drab brown plumage that varies with wear. Wing tips fall short of the uppertail-coverts giving the wings a short appearance. The beak is long and thin (17-23mm) with a slightly decurved bill that has a slight hook at the tip. The tarsus and feet appear long compared to the tibia which is short and feathered. Sexes are monomorphic. In fresh plumage, birds have russet brown plumage extending from the crown down to the back. The uppertail-coverts are rufous, the tail measurers between 51–71 mm, the underparts and belly plumage is a duller rufous brown than the back, and white plumage is found on the throat and chin. An indistinct pale brown supercilium extends from close to the bill to midway on the ear-coverts, the feathers on the crown are slightly elongated and they are often raised to form a crest during song. Juveniles are very similar to adults but have yellowish-brownish uppertail-coverts and underparts. Worn plumage on rump and uppertail-coverts is duller and the upperparts have a grey or olive tinge, the underparts become faded and appear to merge into the paler throat plumage and the supercilium fades to white.

== Song ==
Described as a sweet melodious warble with rich fluty notes as well as hard and metallic sounding notes, Australian reed warbler song is loud and varied. The song of this species consists of sets of short sequences consisting of a pattern of sounds that is repeated, after a 3-5 second interval, in varied combinations. Song is believed to be a sexually selected trait in Australian reed warblers, used as a signal to advertise a male's fitness to females and other males, as well as having a role in establishing and defending breeding territories.

== Habitat ==
Australian reed warblers are found in a wide range of natural and man-made wetlands including fresh, brackish and saltwater environments. Dense vegetation with vertical structures such as reeds (Phragmites), reedmace (Typha) and rushes (Juncus) are frequented in breeding and non-breeding season and Australian reed warblers are often observed perched sideways midway along a reed stem. This species is occasionally observed in shrublands and riparian woodlands surrounding water bodies where it can be observed foraging.

== Ecology ==
=== Feeding ===
This species forages mainly individually but sometimes in pairs, in dense vegetation on insects and spiders and occasionally molluscs and seeds. The Australian reed warbler forages amongst dense riparian vegetation and in surrounding shrubs and woodlands where it can be seen gleaning arthropods from vegetation. This species is also known to sometimes forage on open mud near reeds and rushes.

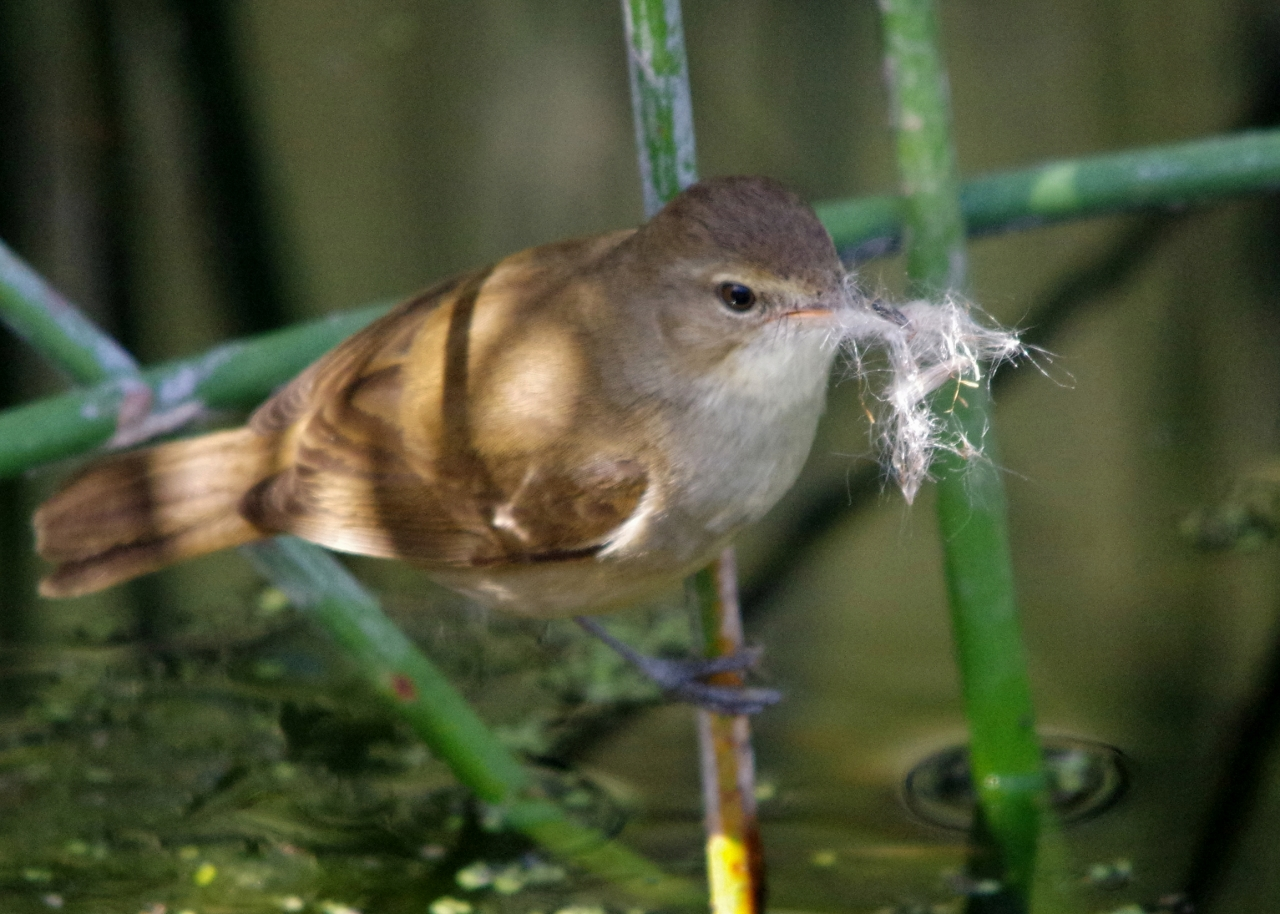
Australian reed warbler building nest

=== Breeding ===
This species forms a socially monogamous seasonal breeding pair; nest building and chick feeding are carried out by the pair for the season. The same male and female pairings are not typically repeated in following seasons. Australian reed warblers are known to be polygynous/polyandrous and engage in extra-pair copulations. Unlike all other Acrocephalus species which are sedentary, the Australian reed warbler migrates seasonally. The Australian reed warbler migrates to Southwest and Southeast Australia to breed from overwinter grounds throughout Eastern and Northern Australia. Males arrive at the breeding grounds from July to August onwards. Breeding season is from October to December in south-eastern Australia and September to December in southern Australia. Both males and females build the nest; however, the females contribute more than the males. The nest is a deep cup (6.4 – 9 cm diameter and 7 – 18.5 cm height) made from dead and fresh vegetation usually supported by fresh and dead reed stems found between 30–200 cm off the ground or water surface. Incubation is carried out by the female for 13 – 15 days and clutch size is between 2 and 4 eggs. Chicks are fed by both the male and female in the nest for a period of 10–13 days and parents continue to feed fledglings outside the nest until they are more than 28 days old. Australian reed warblers have a nesting success of 58%, and nest predation is the major cause of nesting losses.

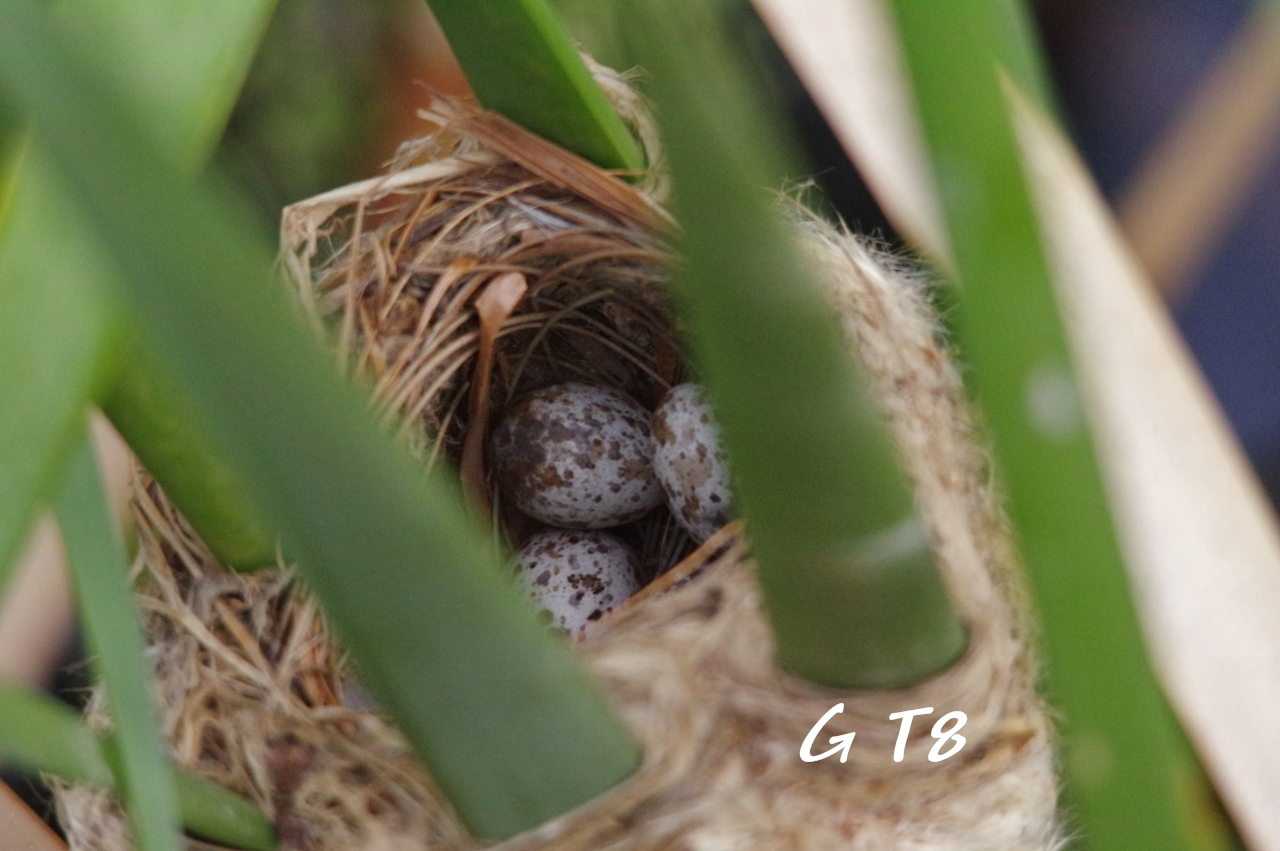
Nest with 4 eggs

=== Courtship and breeding behaviour ===
Males arrive at breeding sites before females to establish a breeding territory. During breeding season, it is believed that males use song to establish and defend their territories as well as to advertise their fitness to other males and to females. Males use song extensively throughout the breeding season and can be observed singing from a perched position on breeding ground reeds with their fore crown feathers raised and throat feathers puffed out whilst singing. Whilst males and females build the nest used for incubating eggs and raising chicks, males build a different type of nest structure during courtship. These nest-like structures lack the strength and shape to be suitable for eggs and chicks, and are constructed prior to breeding commencement. This behaviour and the resultant nest-like structure is believed to be driven by mate selection, as well as the selection of a breeding territory during the formation of breeding pairs.

== Threats and human interaction ==
This species is vulnerable to loss of suitable habitat through burning, clearing or draining of waterbodies and reed vegetation surrounding the waterbodies. Migratory birds in south-east Australia are undergoing changes in breeding ground arrival and departure dates as a result of the effects of climate change. The extent of these effects specifically on Australian reed warblers is unknown.
