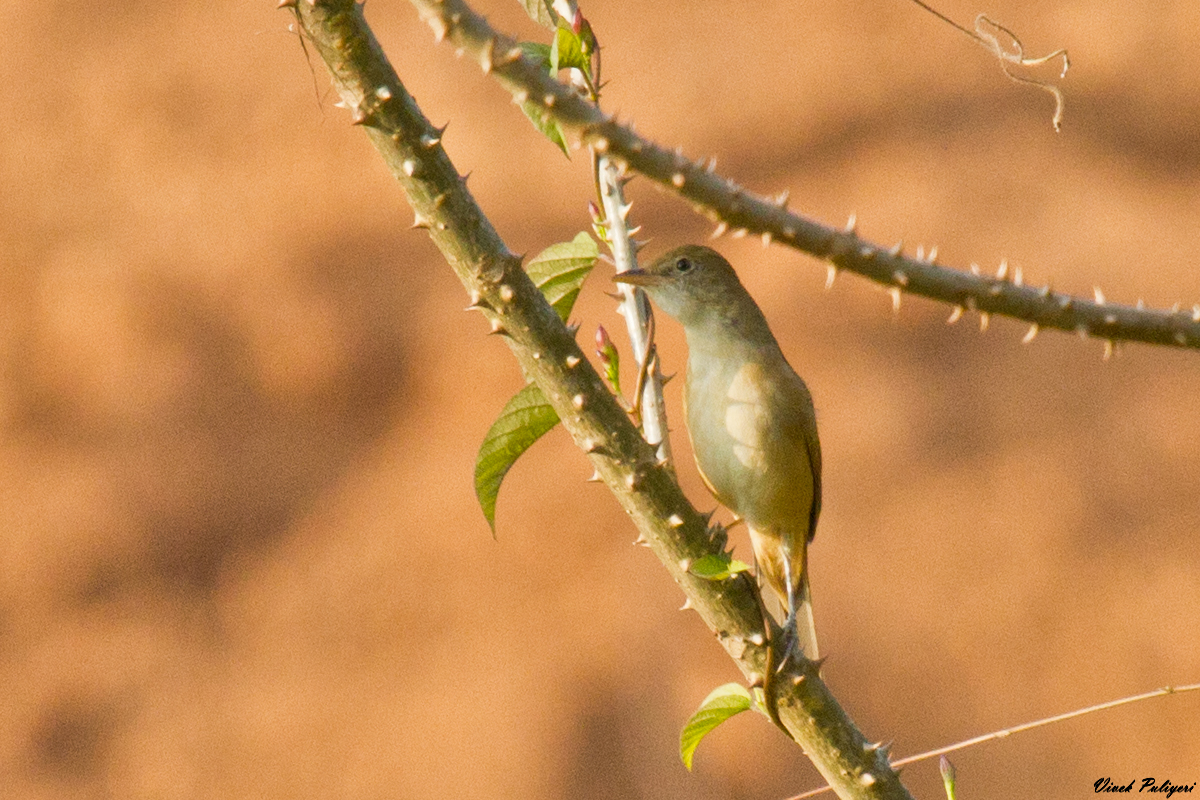

Conservation status
- Least Concern (IUCN 3.1)

Scientific classification
- Kingdom: Animalia
- Phylum: Chordata
- Class: Aves
- Order: Passeriformes
- Family: Acrocephalidae
- Genus: Arundinax; Blyth, 1845
- Species: A. aedon

Binomial name
- Arundinax aedon (Pallas, 1776)

Subspecies
- A. a. aedon - (Pallas, 1776); A. a. rufescens - (Stegmann, 1929)
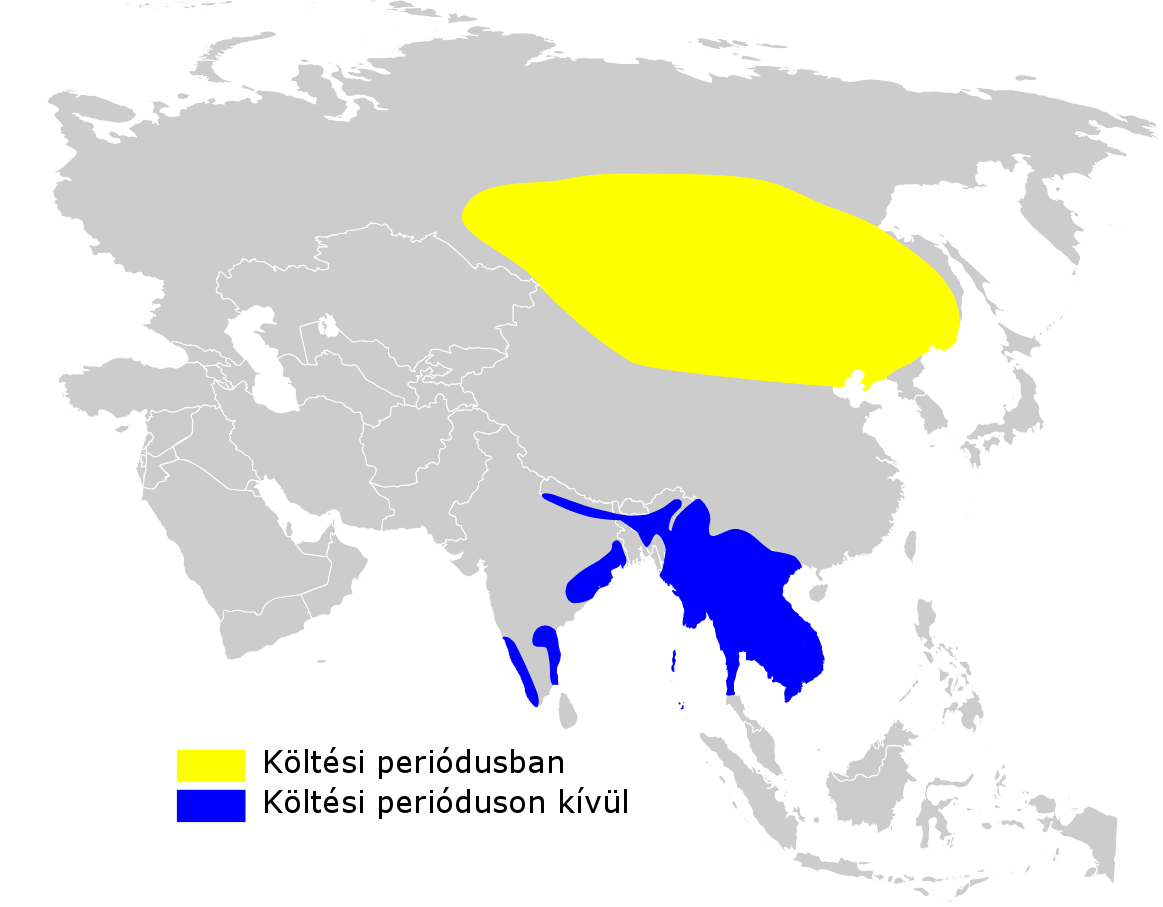
- Distribution of Thick-billed Warbler Breeding Non-breeding

Synonyms
- Acrocephalus aedon; Phragamaticola aedon; Iduna aedon

= Thick-billed warbler =

Species of bird

The thick-billed warbler (Arundinax aedon) breeds in the temperate east Palearctic, from south Siberia to west Mongolia. It is migratory, wintering in tropical South Asia and South-east Asia. It is a very rare vagrant to western Europe.

This passerine bird is a species found in dense vegetation such as reeds, bushes and thick undergrowth. Five or six eggs are laid in a nest in a low tree.

This is a large warbler, at 16–17.5 cm (6.3–6.9 in) long, which is nearly as big as the great reed warbler. The adult has an unstreaked brown back and buff underparts, with few obvious distinctive plumage features. The forehead is rounded, and the bill is short and pointed. The sexes are identical, as with most warblers, but young birds are richer buff below. Like most warblers, it is insectivorous, but will take other small prey items.

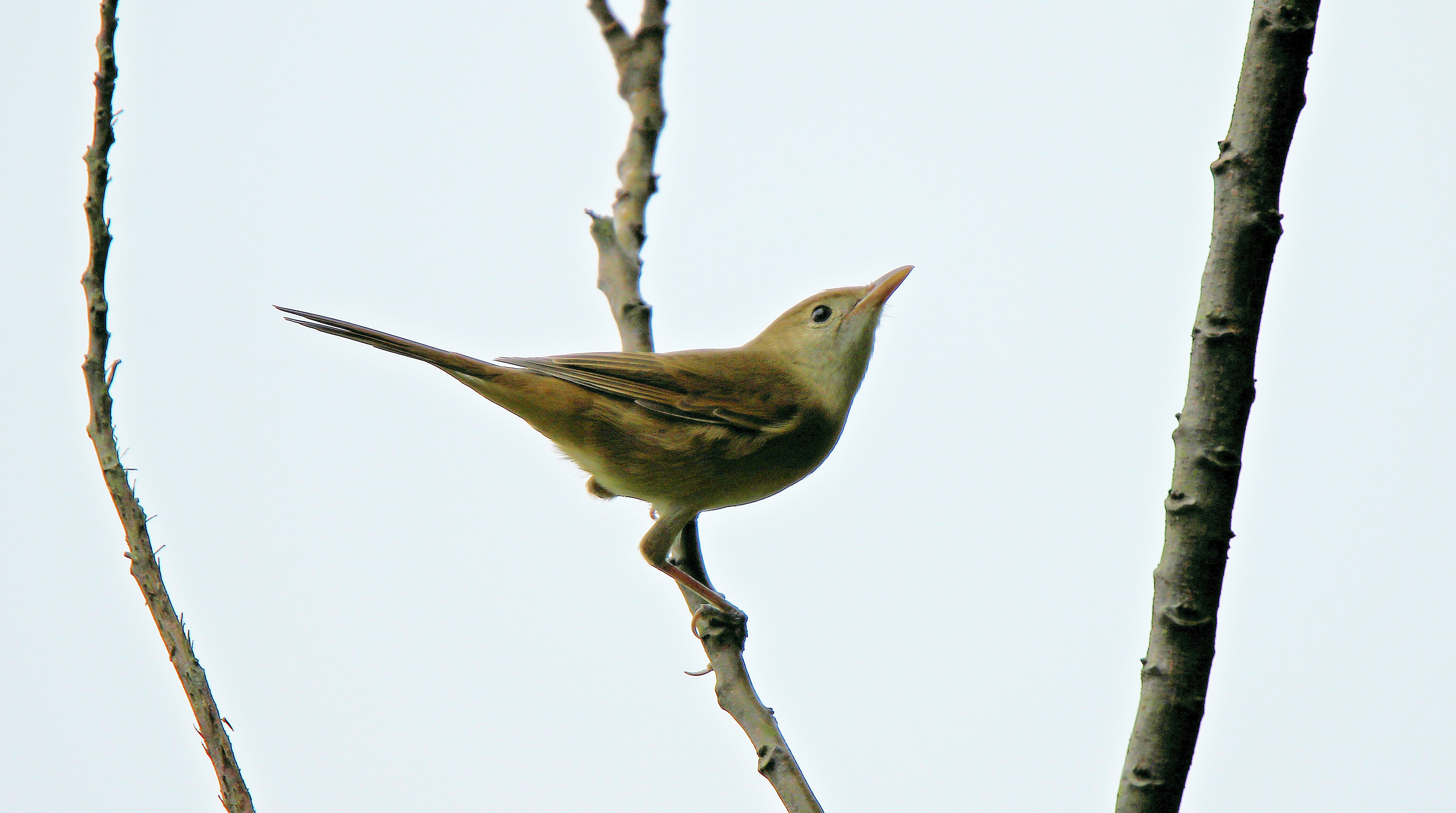
Thick-billed warbler

The song is fast and loud, and similar to the marsh warbler, with much mimicry and typically acrocephaline whistles added.

It was sometimes placed in the monotypic genus Phragmaticola (or Phragamaticola) and for a long time as Acrocephalus and in 2009 suggested as being within the Iduna clade. However, a 2014 phylogeny study based on more loci indicated that it did not fit into the Iduna clade, and therefore suggested a resurrection of the genus Phragamaticola or Arundinax; the latter, being the older available genus name, has priority.

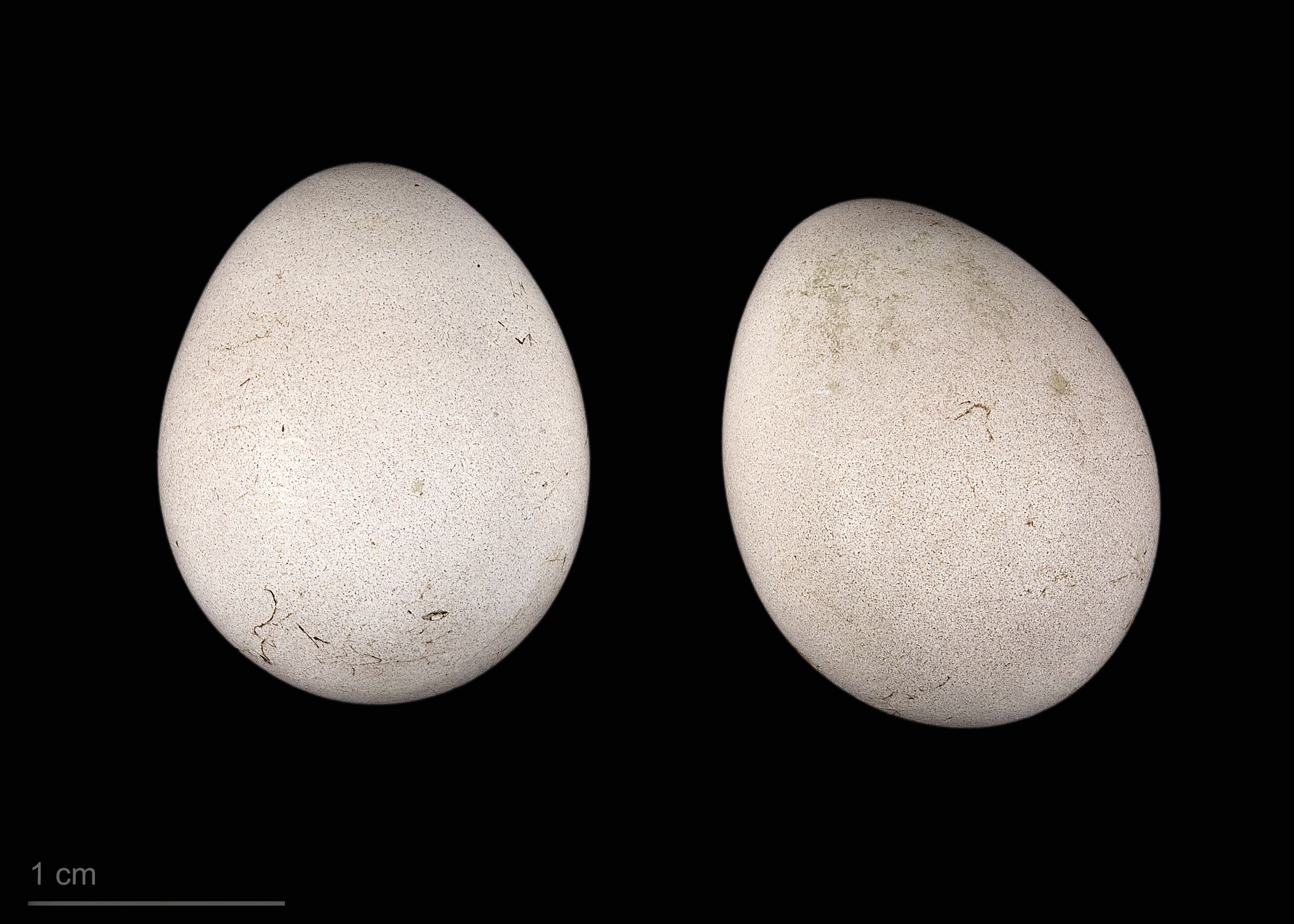
Arundinax aedon aedon - MHNT

The genus Arundinax is from Latin arundo, arundinis meaning "reed" and Ancient Greek anax which means "master". The specific aedon is from Ancient Greek aedon and means nightingale. In Greek mythology, Queen Aëdon was changed into a nightingale after killing her own son Itylus while attempting to murder one of the sons of her sister-in-law Niobe.
