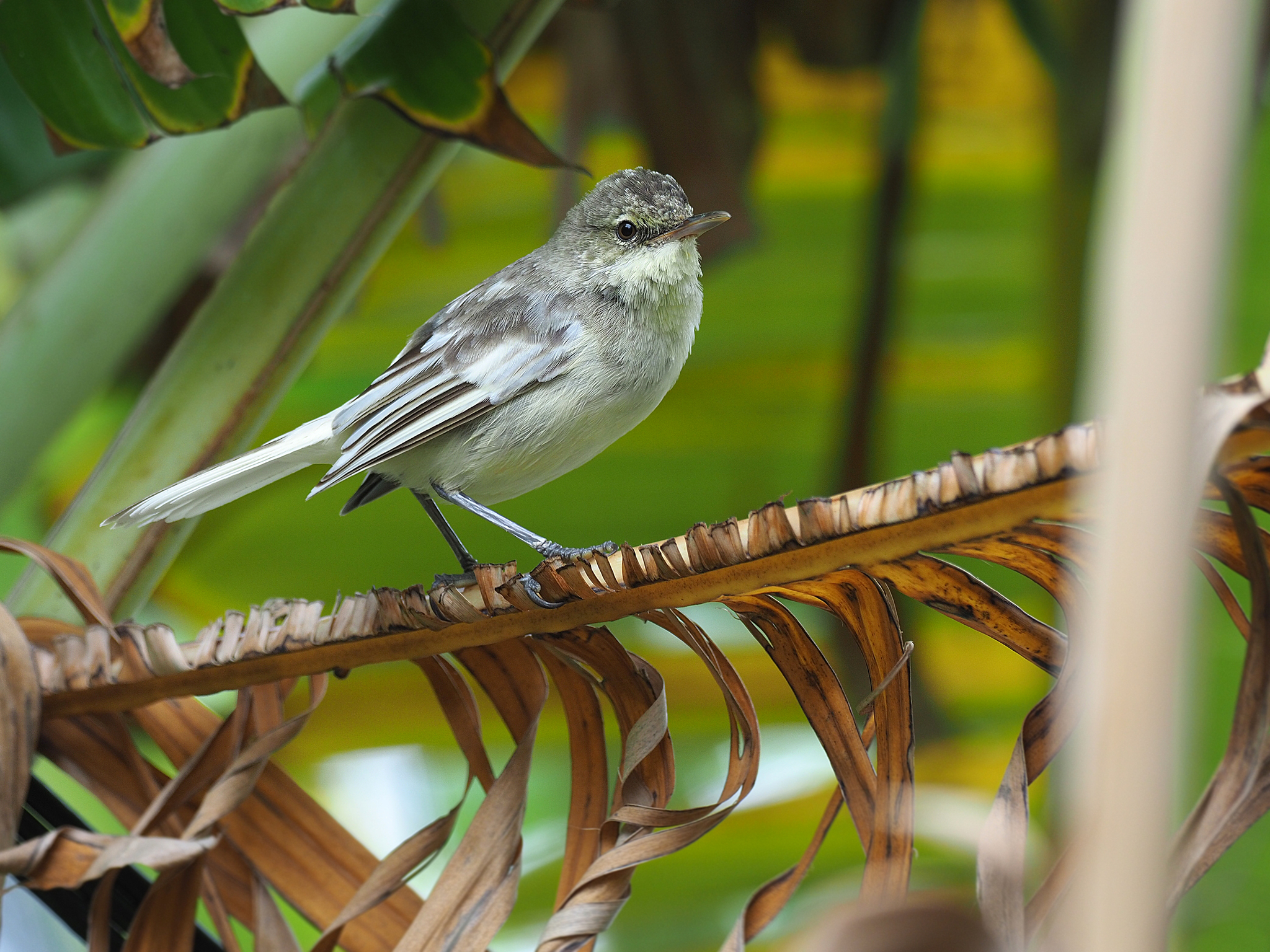

Conservation status
- Endangered (IUCN 3.1)

Scientific classification
- Kingdom: Animalia
- Phylum: Chordata
- Class: Aves
- Order: Passeriformes
- Family: Acrocephalidae
- Genus: Acrocephalus
- Species: A. vaughani

Binomial name
- Acrocephalus vaughani (Sharpe, 1900)
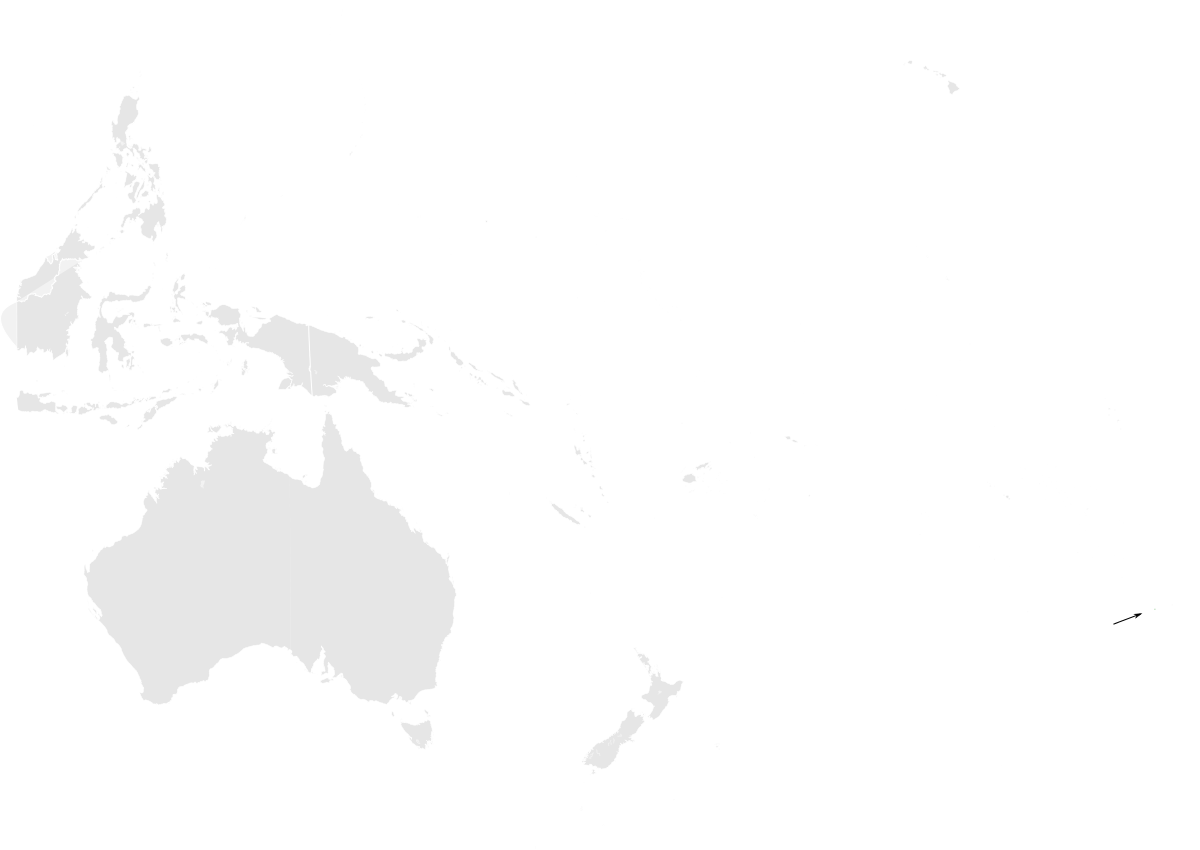

= Pitcairn reed warbler =

Species of bird

The Pitcairn reed warbler (Acrocephalus vaughani) is a songbird in the genus Acrocephalus. Formerly placed in the "Old World warbler" assemblage (Sylviidae), it is now in the newly recognized marsh-warbler family Acrocephalidae.

It is endemic to Pitcairn Island in the southern Pacific. Locally known as the "sparrow" (true sparrows are not found on Pitcairn), it used to be common throughout the island, where it is the only land bird.

== Taxonomy ==
Historically, the species was treated as being conspecific with the Henderson reed warbler, Rimatara reed warbler, and Cook reed warbler based on morphological similarities between the species. In 1992, the American ornithologist Gary Graves split the taxa into distinct species, citing differences in the pattern of leucistic plumage between the species.

A 2011 study of mitochondrial DNA found the Pitcairn reed warbler to be part of a group of Acrocephalus found only in eastern Polynesia. Within this group, it was sister to the Henderson reed warbler. These two species were basal within the group and sister to all the other species in the radiation, including the Rimatara reed warbler.

== Distribution and habitat ==
The warbler is endemic to Pitcairn Island in the South Pacific Ocean. It is a generalist species and is widespread on the island, especially in stands of introduced rose apple trees and scrubland in gardens. It avoids Pandanus monocultures, grass fern fields, and bare ground.

== Conservation ==
It was formerly classified as a vulnerable species by the IUCN due to its small range. But new research has shown it to be rarer than it was believed. Consequently, it was uplisted to endangered status in 2008.
