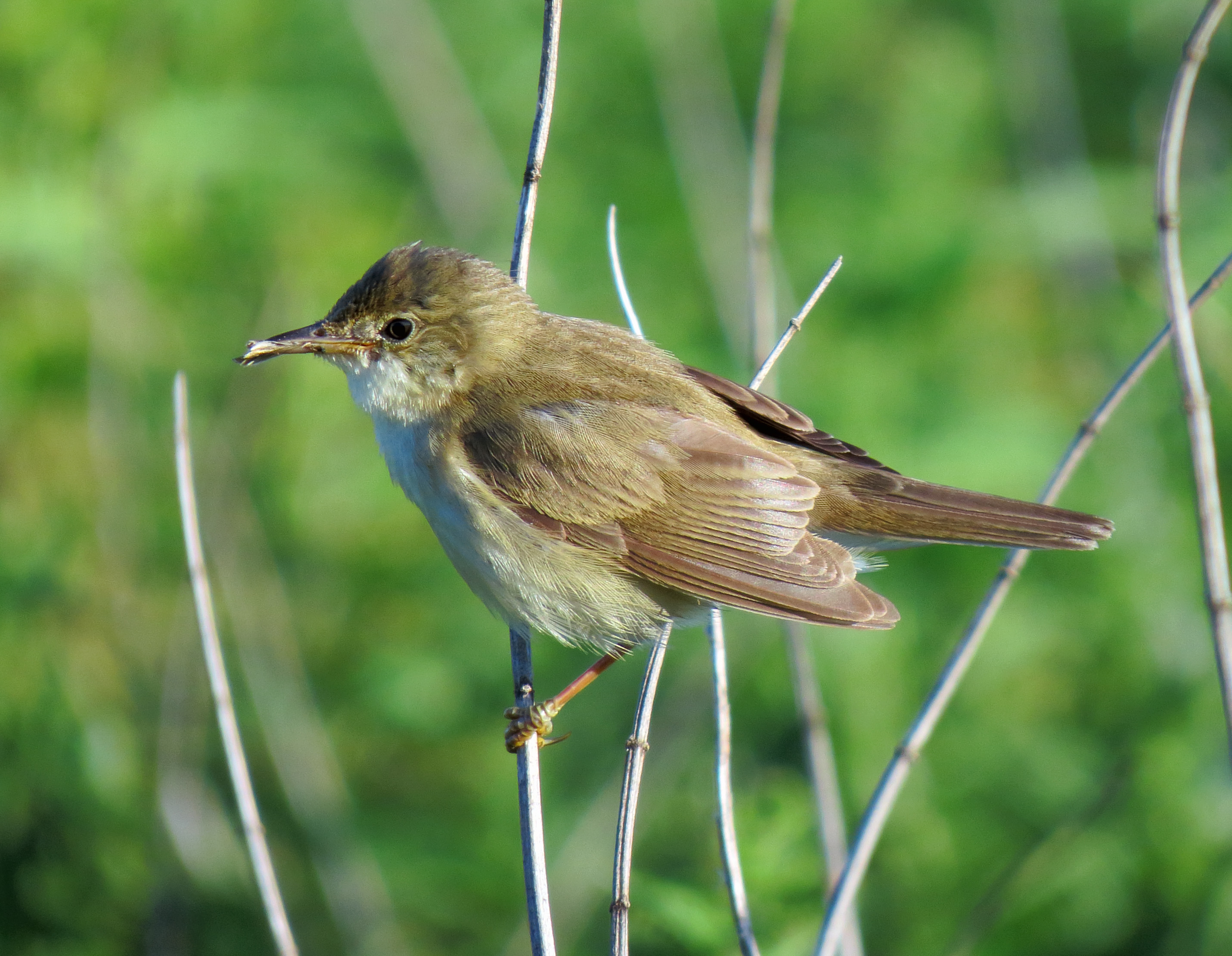
- In Irpin, Ukraine

Conservation status
- Least Concern (IUCN 3.1)

Scientific classification
- Kingdom: Animalia
- Phylum: Chordata
- Class: Aves
- Order: Passeriformes
- Family: Acrocephalidae
- Genus: Acrocephalus
- Species: A. palustris

Binomial name
- Acrocephalus palustris (Bechstein, 1798)
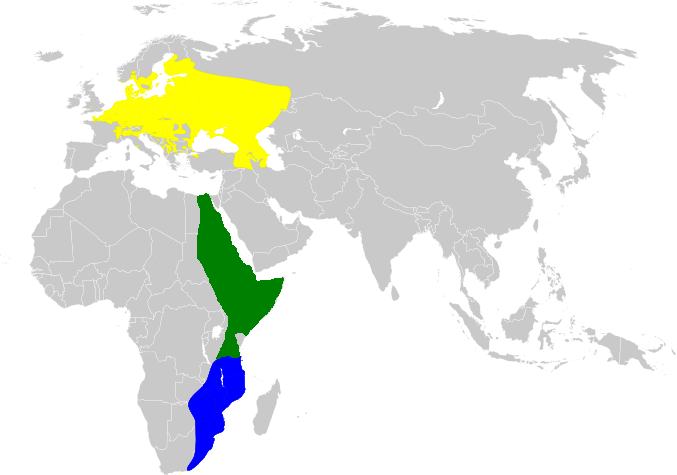
- Breeding Passage Nonbreeding

Audio
- Recorded in Worcestershire, England

= Marsh warbler =

Species of bird

The marsh warbler (Acrocephalus palustris) is an Old World warbler currently classified in the family Acrocephalidae. It breeds in temperate Europe and the western Palearctic and winters mainly in southeast Africa. It is notable for incorporating striking imitations of a wide variety of other birds into its song.

The marsh warbler breeds in a variety of mostly damp habitats, but in Africa winters mainly in dry, well-vegetated areas. It is common over much of its breeding range and expanding its distribution in some areas. However, in Britain it is now virtually extinct as a breeding bird, though the reasons for its decline are unclear. This insectivorous warbler can be easily confused with several close relatives, but the imitative song of the male is highly distinctive.

== Taxonomy ==
The marsh warbler was formally described in 1798 by the German naturalist Johann Matthäus Bechstein under the scientific name Motacilla s. Sylvia palustris. The type locality is Germany. The marsh warbler is now one of around 40 species placed in the genus Acrocephalus that was introduced by Johann Andreas Naumann and his son Johann Friedrich Naumann in 1811. The genus name Acrocephalus is from Ancient Greek άκρος (akros) 'highest' and κεφαλή (kephale) 'head'. It is possible that the Naumanns thought akros meant 'sharp-pointed'. The specific palustris is from Latin and means 'marshy'. The species is considered as monotypic, and there is no significant geographical variation.

== Description ==
This is a medium-sized warbler. It is very similar in appearance to several other acrocephaline warblers, such as the reed warbler which also occurs in wetlands and has a similar breeding range. The male's distinctive song is useful for identification, as no other member of the genus mimics other birds to any significant extent. The marsh warbler also tends to avoid the stands of pure reed which are the reed warbler's favoured habitat. The sexes are alike in appearance. Hybridisation with both reed warbler and Blyth's reed warbler has been occasionally recorded.

The marsh warbler is best known for the highly imitative song uttered by males, and very occasionally by females. Each male marsh warbler incorporates imitations of a wide range of other birds into its song. Other passerines are most commonly imitated, but the calls of other kinds of bird such as waders, hornbills and pigeons have been noted too. On average, each male bird incorporates imitations of 75 other species into its song, with rather more African than northern species mimicked. All learning seems to take place in the summer the bird is hatched in Europe or Asia, and in its first winter in Africa. The calls of birds heard in subsequent years are not added to the warbler's repertoire. Females may utter a simple, non-imitative song, and a range of other calls are also known.

== Distribution and habitat ==
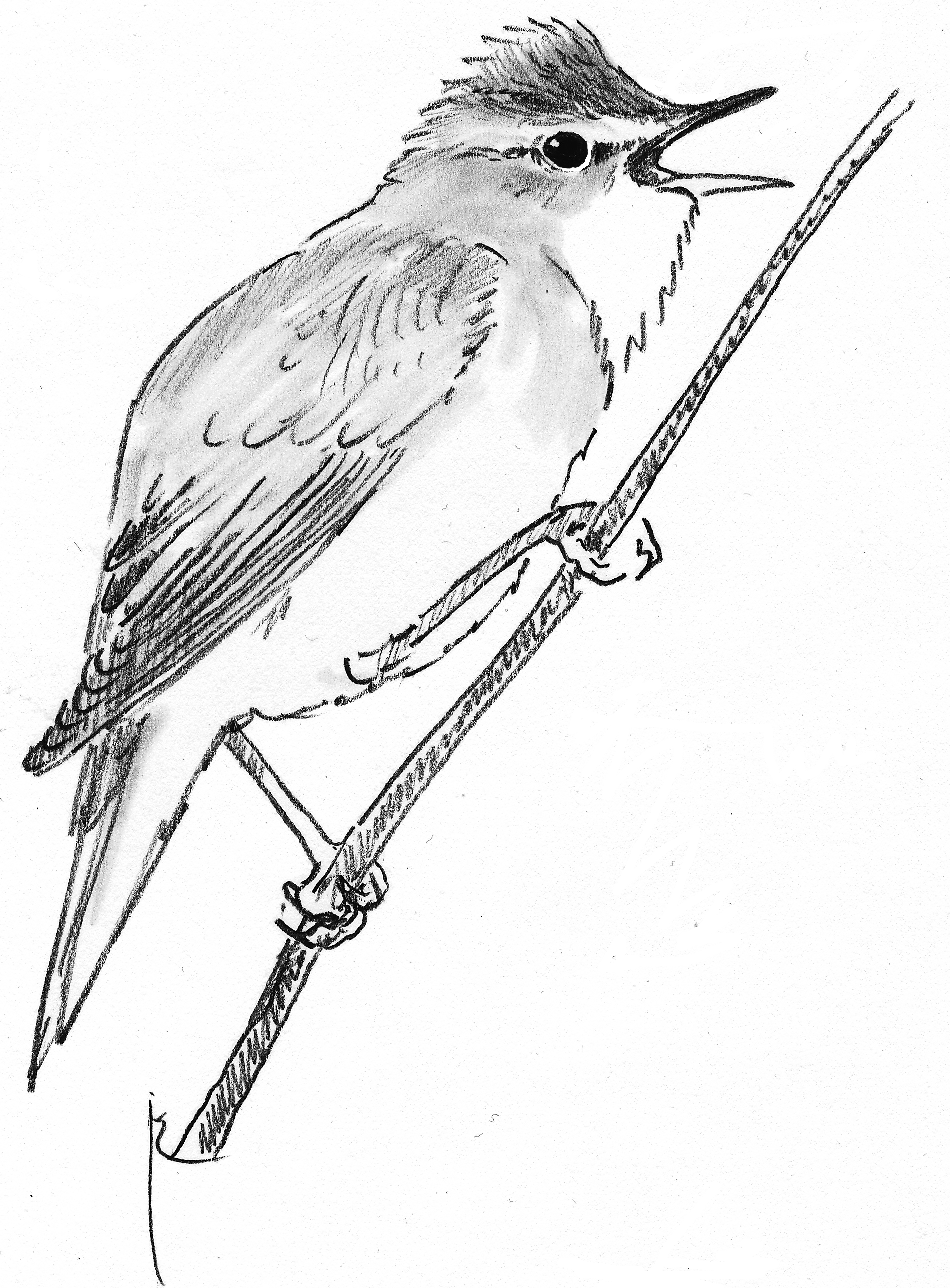
Drawing by Jos Zwarts

The marsh warbler breeds in the middle latitudes of Europe and western Asia, from the English Channel to about 70 degrees east. It mainly occupies areas with a continental climate, but breeds, or has bred, in Britain and northern France as well. It is principally a bird of the lowlands, but occurs at altitudes of up to 3000m in Georgia. In recent decades it has expanded its range to the north, with increasing numbers of birds breeding in Scandinavia and north-west Russia. Singing males are occasionally heard in Ireland, most recently in 2017.

In western Europe the marsh warbler breeds mainly in rank vegetation on damp or seasonally flooded soils, and is particularly attracted to tall herbaceous vegetation such as nettles, meadowsweet, willowherbs and to young osiers and other low woody plants. It may breed in urban brownfield sites with suitable vegetation, for instance in Berlin, and also occasionally in arable crops. In the eastern part of its range, it breeds on dry hillsides with shrubs and in open woodland, as well as the kind of damper habitats it frequents in the west.

The marsh warbler winters mainly in south-east Africa, from Cape Province north to Zambia and Malawi. It makes use of a range of well-vegetated habitats, from moist scrub to dense thickets and woodland edge, at altitudes up to 2400m. Marsh warblers tend to migrate from Europe to Africa via the Middle East, with many crossing Arabia and arriving in Africa on Sudan's Red Sea coast. Adults usually leave their breeding grounds soon after their young are independent, with their offspring following about two weeks later. On the Red Sea coast most birds arrive from mid-August to mid-September, with numbers of adults peaking in August and of young birds in September. Birds tend to spend much of the autumn somewhere in north-east or east Africa, before continuing south to arrive on their wintering grounds in December or January.

In spring, marsh warblers leave their wintering grounds in March or April. They are thought to follow broadly similar routes to their autumn migration. Birds breeding in south-east Europe, for instance on the Black Sea coast, may arrive there by late April. In other parts of their range, the majority of birds do not arrive until mid-May. On the western and northern edge of their range, such as in England, birds do not tend to arrive until the end of May or early June.

As a vagrant, the species has been recorded as far away as Iceland and Madeira.

== Behaviour ==
=== Breeding ===
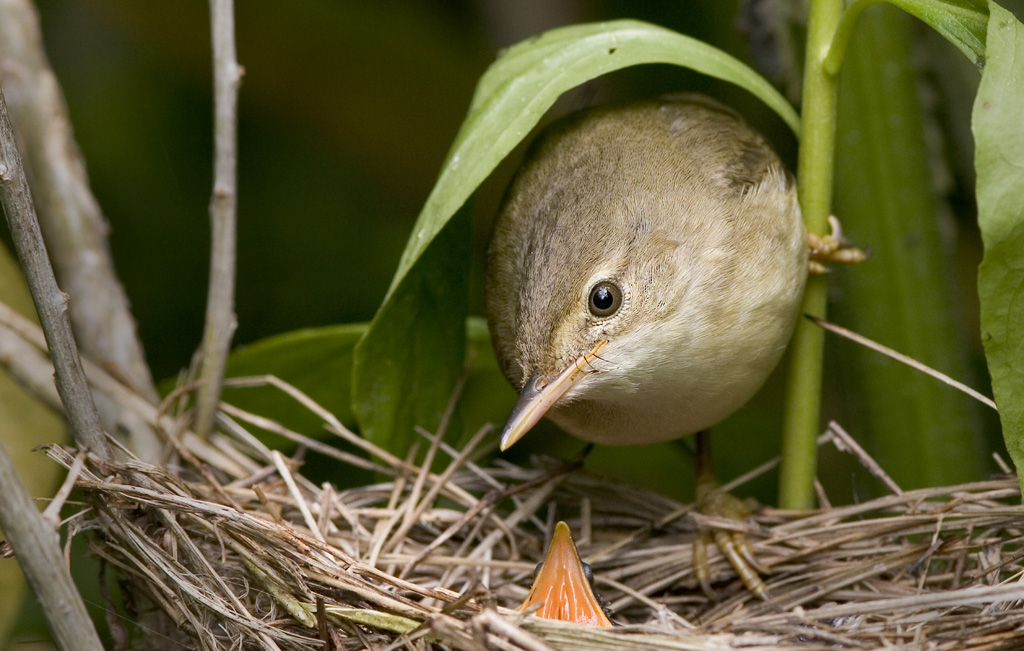
Marsh warbler with a cuckoo nestling.

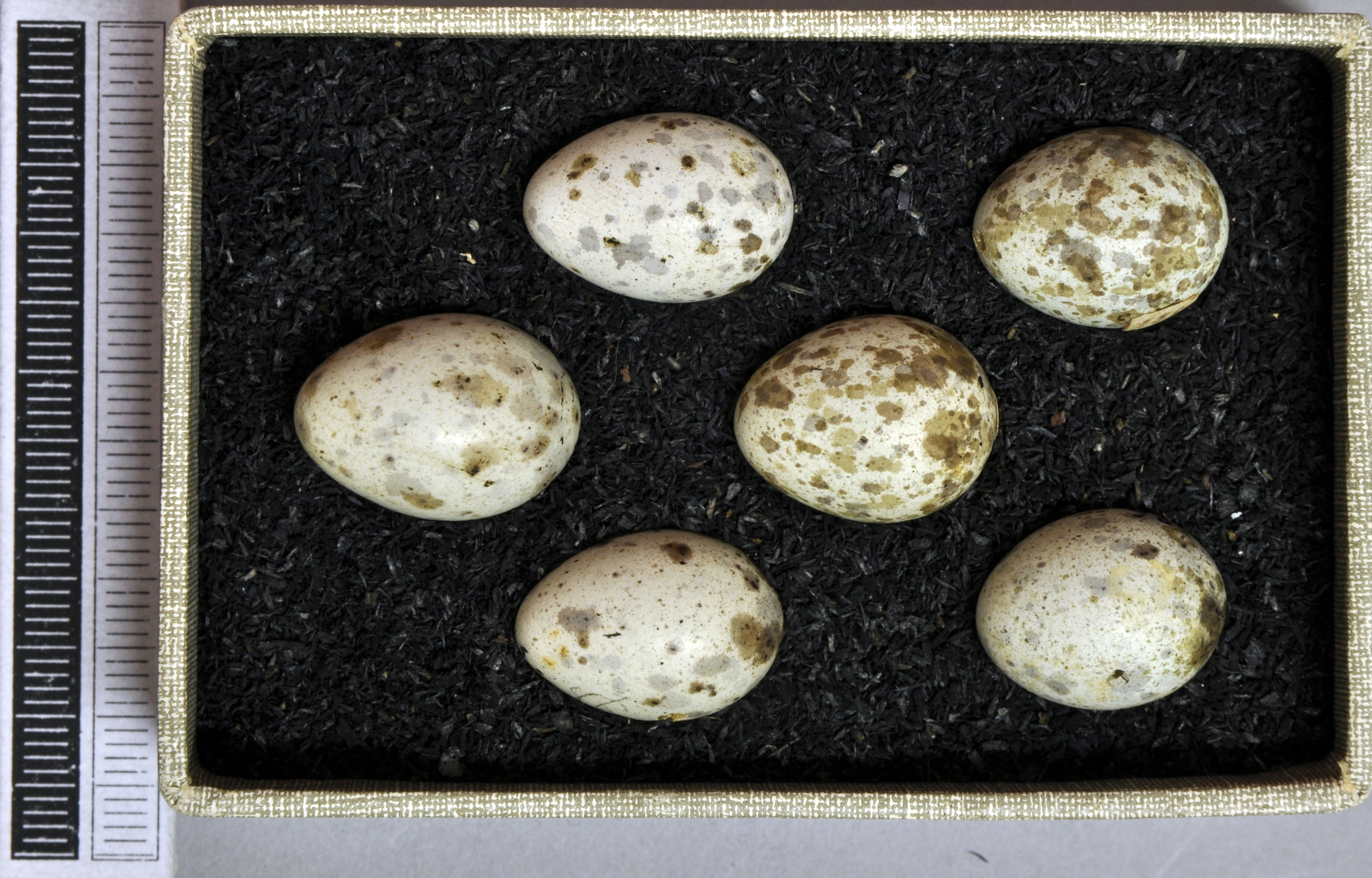
Eggs, Collection Museum Wiesbaden

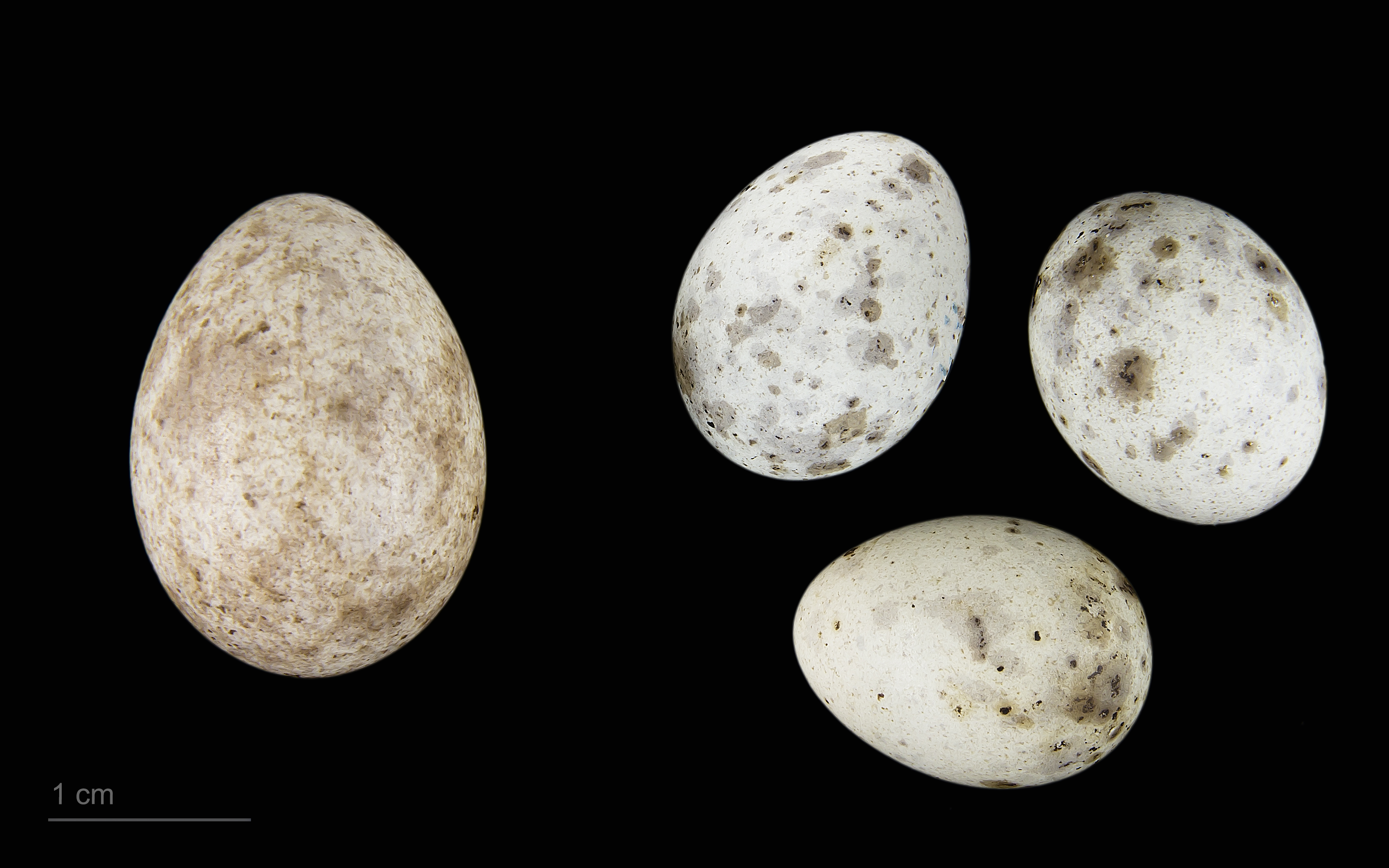
Cuculus canorus canorus in a clutch of Acrocephalus palustris - MHNT

The species is usually monogamous. Marsh warblers tend to choose new mates each year and do not necessarily return to breed in the same area as previous years. On their breeding grounds they are territorial, with territories often grouped into loose colonies. In Africa, they are essentially solitary, and may defend territories to some extent. The nest is a cup, made mostly from leaves and plant stems, and is usually in dense vegetation, at varying heights. Three to six eggs are laid. Both sexes bring food to the nestlings. In continental Europe at least, the species has a short breeding season, of 52–55 days. In some areas, such as Bulgaria, marsh warblers suffer significant levels of parasitism by common cuckoos.

=== Food and feeding ===
The marsh warbler is mostly insectivorous, but also takes some spiders and small numbers of snails. It generally gleans insects from vegetation but sometimes catches them on the ground or in mid-air. In autumn small numbers of berries may be eaten. There have been no detailed studies of the bird's diet in Africa, though foraging techniques during winter are known to be very similar to those in other seasons.

== Conservation ==
Globally, the population is believed to be increasing, and the IUCN categorises the species as of least concern. It is estimated to have a total population of 10 to 27 million individuals.

In Britain the species was never widespread, and disappeared from many areas from the 1930s onwards. By the 1970s marsh warblers bred in significant numbers only in Worcestershire, where 40-70 pairs were recorded each year. This population was effectively extinct by the end of the 1990s. From the 1970s and 1980s onwards, a very small population slowly developed in south-east England. However, this population is also now close to extinction. The reasons for the population decline in Britain are not completely understood, despite there appearing to be much suitable habitat. The Biodiversity Action Plan for the species further comments that it is not clear what can be done to conserve the species apart from protecting habitat at known breeding sites and protecting birds from egg collectors and from disturbance.
