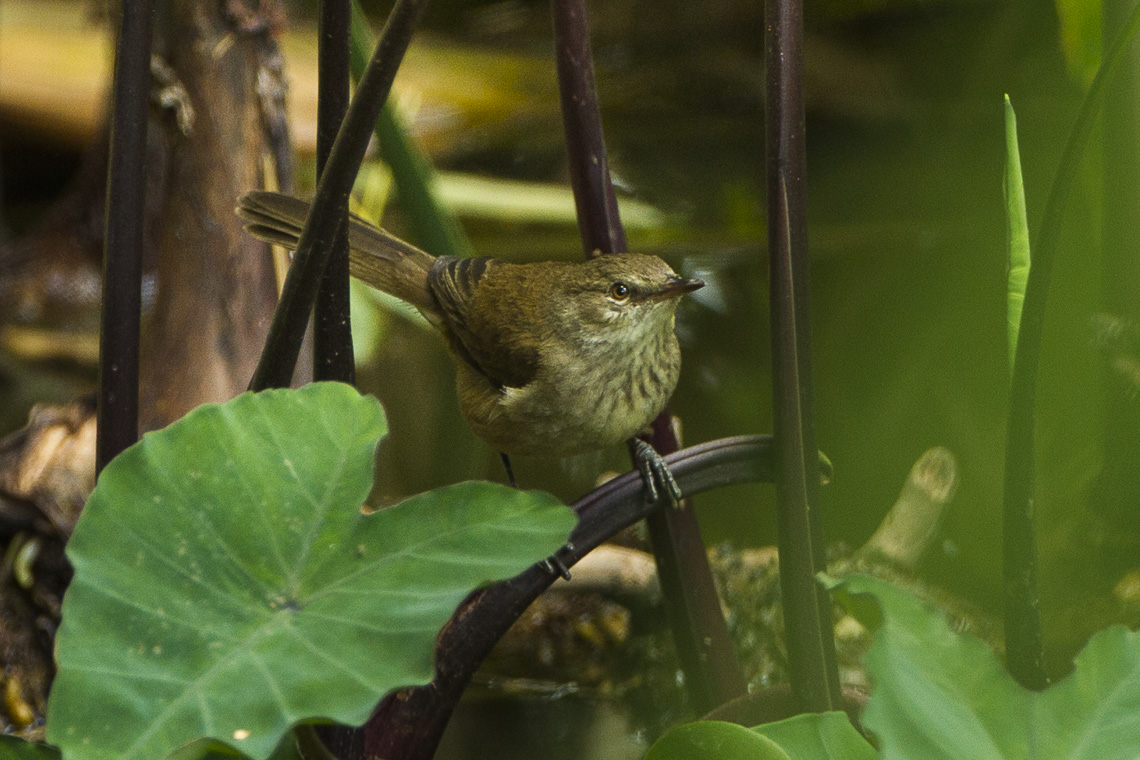

Conservation status
- Least Concern (IUCN 3.1)

Scientific classification
- Kingdom: Animalia
- Phylum: Chordata
- Class: Aves
- Order: Passeriformes
- Family: Acrocephalidae
- Genus: Acrocephalus
- Species: A. newtoni

Binomial name
- Acrocephalus newtoni (Hartlaub, 1863)
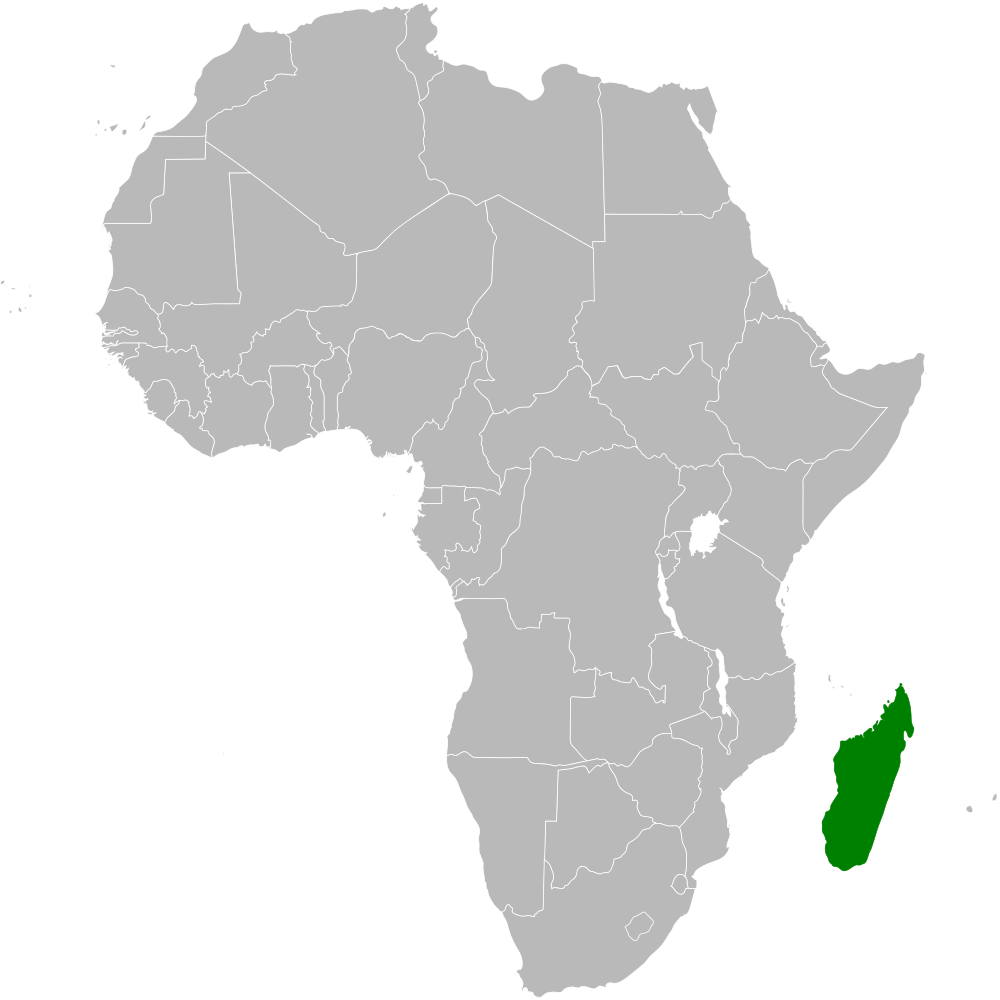

= Madagascar swamp warbler =

Species of bird

The Madagascar swamp warbler (Acrocephalus newtoni) is a species of Old World warbler in the family Acrocephalidae. It is found only in Madagascar. Its natural habitat is swamps.
