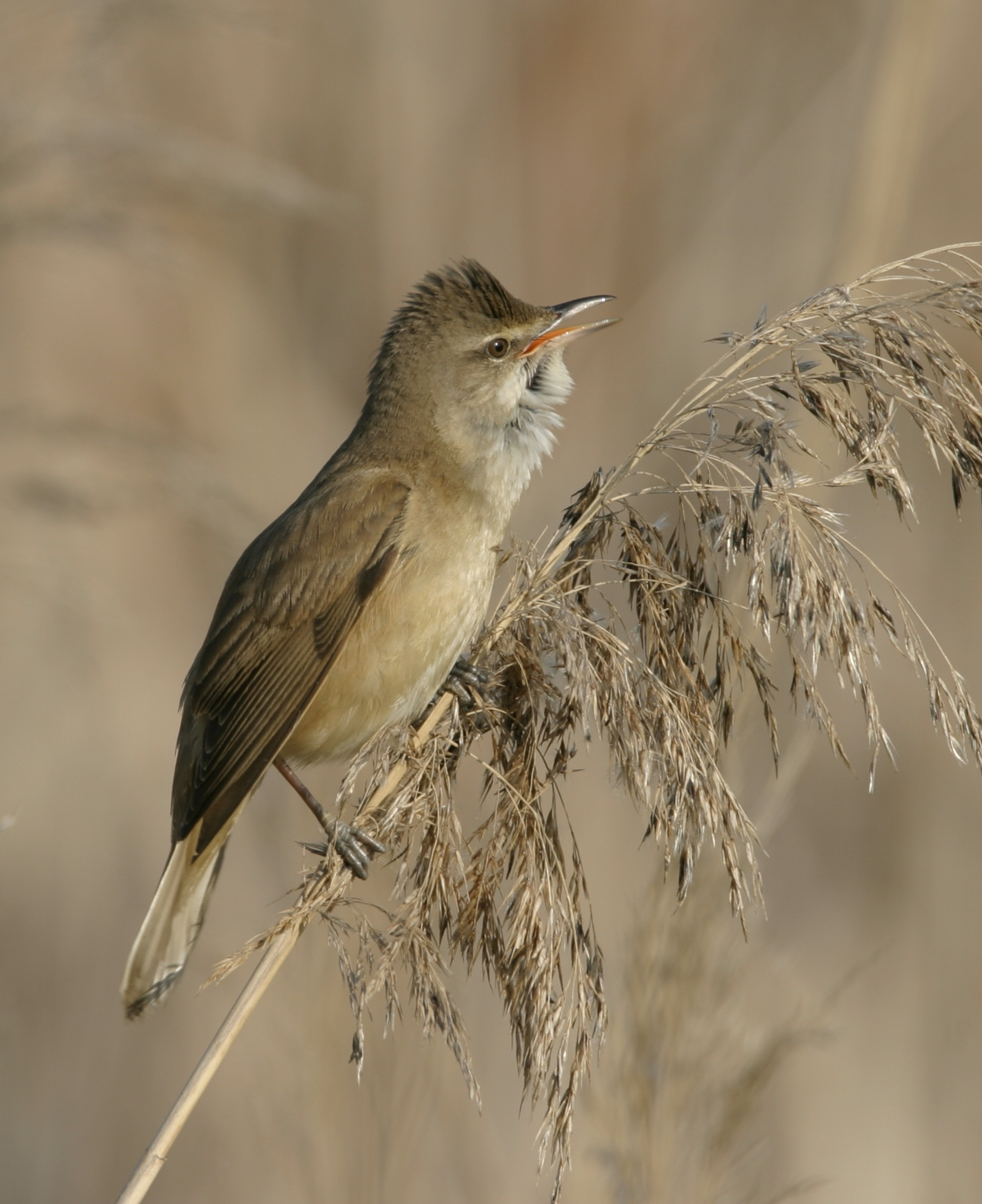
- Great reed warbler (Acrocephalus arundinaceus)

Scientific classification
- Kingdom: Animalia
- Phylum: Chordata
- Class: Aves
- Order: Passeriformes
- Superfamily: Locustelloidea
- Family: Acrocephalidae; Salvin, 1882

Genera
- Graueria; Nesillas; Acrocephalus; Arundinax; Iduna; Calamonastides; Hippolais

= Acrocephalidae =

Family of birds

The Acrocephalidae (the reed warblers, marsh- and tree-warblers, or acrocephalid warblers) are a family of oscine passerine birds, in the superfamily Locustelloidea.

The species in this family are usually rather large "warblers". Most are rather plain olivaceous brown above with much yellow to beige below. They are usually found in open woodland, reedbeds, or tall grass. The family occurs mostly in southern to western Eurasia and surroundings, but also ranges far into the Pacific, with some species in Africa.

== Species ==
Image	Genus	Living species
	Acrocephalus J. A. Naumann & J. F. Naumann, 1811	Marsh-warblers. About 43 species; para- or polyphyletic.: Moustached warbler, Acrocephalus melanopogon; Aquatic warbler, Acrocephalus paludicola; Sedge warbler, Acrocephalus schoenobaenus; Speckled reed warbler, Acrocephalus sorghophilus; Black-browed reed warbler, Acrocephalus bistrigiceps; Paddyfield warbler, Acrocephalus agricola; Manchurian reed warbler, Acrocephalus tangorum; Blunt-winged warbler, Acrocephalus concinens; Common reed warbler, Acrocephalus scirpaceus; Caspian reed warbler, Acrocephalus (scirpaceus) fuscus; Mangrove reed warbler, Acrocephalus (scirpaceus) avicenniae; Blyth's reed warbler, Acrocephalus dumetorum; Marsh warbler, Acrocephalus palustris; Great reed warbler, Acrocephalus arundinaceus; Oriental reed warbler, Acrocephalus orientalis; Clamorous reed warbler, Acrocephalus stentoreus; Large-billed reed warbler, Acrocephalus orinus; Basra reed warbler, Acrocephalus griseldis; Australian reed warbler, Acrocephalus australis; †Nightingale reed warbler, Acrocephalus luscinius; Saipan reed warbler, Acrocephalus hiwae; †Aguiguan reed warbler, Acrocephalus nijoi – extinct (c.1997); †Mangareva reed warbler, Acrocephalus astrolabii – extinct (mid-19th century?); †Pagan reed warbler, Acrocephalus yamashinae extinct (1970s); Caroline reed warbler, Acrocephalus syrinx; Nauru reed warbler, Acrocephalus rehsei; Millerbird, Acrocephalus familiaris; †Laysan millerbird, Acrocephalus familiaris familiaris – extinct (late 1910s); Bokikokiko, Acrocephalus aequinoctialis; Tahiti reed warbler, Acrocephalus caffer; Moorea reed warbler, Acrocephalus longirostris; †Garrett's reed warbler, Acrocephalus garretti – extinct (19th century?); †Raiatea reed warbler, Acrocephalus caffer musae – extinct (19th century?); Tuamotu reed warbler, Acrocephalus atyphus; Rimatara reed warbler, Acrocephalus rimatarae; Pitcairn reed warbler, Acrocephalus vaughani; Henderson reed warbler, Acrocephalus taiti; Northern Marquesan reed warbler, Acrocephalus percernis; Southern Marquesan reed warbler, Acrocephalus mendanae; Cook reed warbler, Acrocephalus kerearako; Greater swamp warbler, Acrocephalus rufescens; Cape Verde warbler, Acrocephalus brevipennis; Lesser swamp warbler, Acrocephalus gracilirostris; Madagascar swamp warbler, Acrocephalus newtoni; Rodrigues warbler, Acrocephalus rodericanus; Seychelles warbler, Acrocephalus sechellensis; Grande Comore brush warbler, Acrocephalus brevicaudata
	Arundinax Blyth, 1845	Thick-billed warbler, Arundinax aedon
	Iduna Keyserling & Blasius, 1840	Booted warbler, Iduna caligata; Sykes's warbler, Iduna rama; Eastern olivaceous warbler, Iduna pallida; Western olivaceous warbler, Iduna opaca; African yellow warbler, Iduna natalensis; Mountain yellow warbler, Iduna similis
	Hippolais von Baldenstein, 1827	Upcher's warbler, Hippolais languida; Olive-tree warbler, Hippolais olivetorum; Melodious warbler, Hippolais polyglotta; Icterine warbler, Hippolais icterina
	Calamonastides Grant & Mackworth-Praed, 1940	Papyrus yellow warbler, Calamonastides gracilirostris
	Graueria Hartert, 1908	Grauer's warbler, Graueria vittata
	Nesillas Oberholser, 1899	Brush warblers. 5 living species, 1 recently extinct.: Anjouan brush warbler, Nesillas longicaudata; Malagasy brush warbler, Nesillas typica; Grand Comoro brush warbler, Nesillas brevicaudata; Moheli brush warbler, Nesillas mariae; Subdesert brush warbler, Nesillas lantzii; † Aldabra brush warbler, Nesillas aldabrana (extinct: c.1984)
