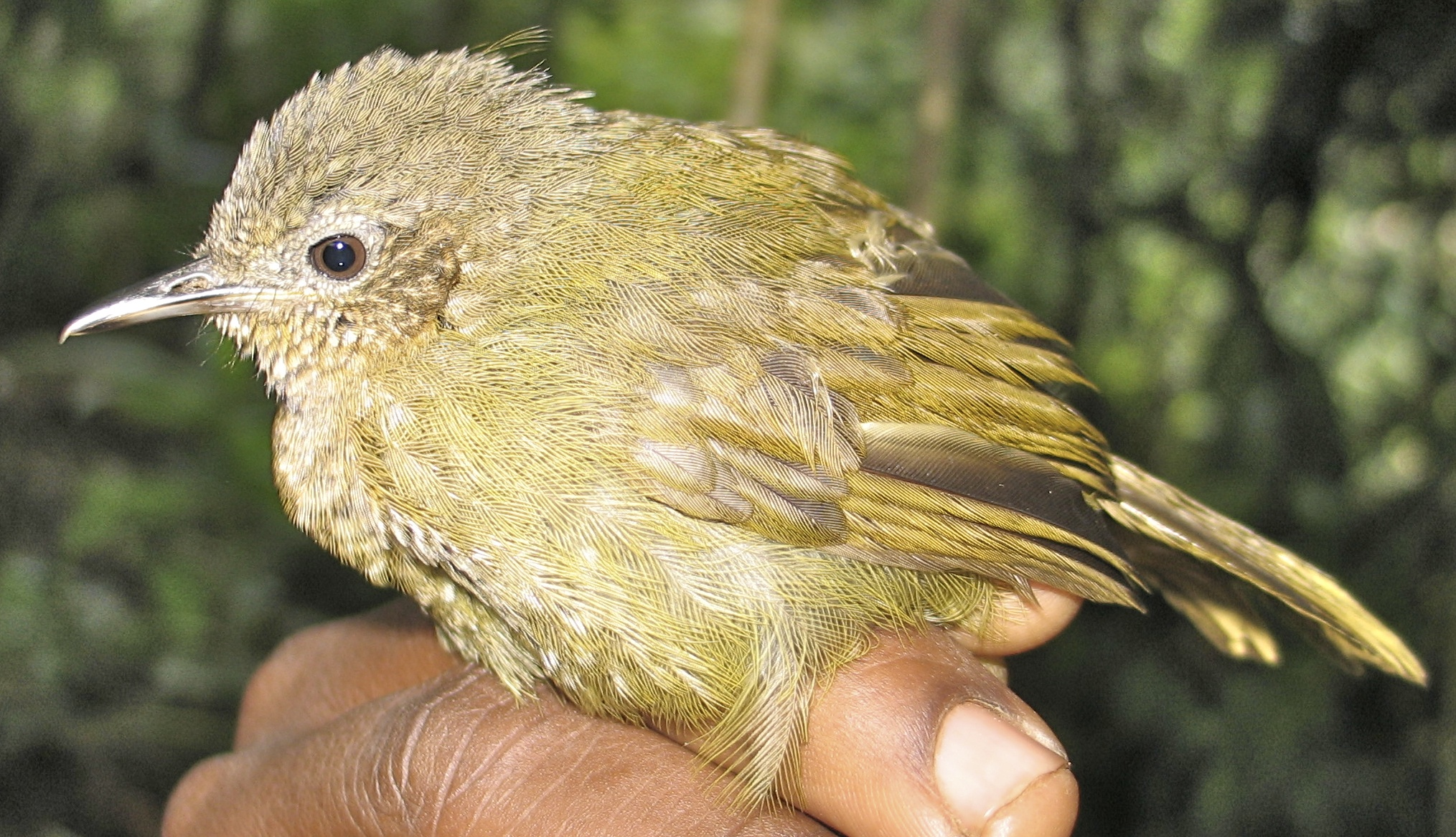

Conservation status
- Least Concern (IUCN 3.1)

Scientific classification
- Kingdom: Animalia
- Phylum: Chordata
- Class: Aves
- Order: Passeriformes
- Superfamily: Locustelloidea
- Family: Acrocephalidae
- Genus: Graueria; Hartert, 1908
- Species: G. vittata

Binomial name
- Graueria vittata Hartert, 1908

= Grauer's warbler =

Species of bird

Grauer's warbler (Graueria vittata) is a species of Old World warbler in the family Acrocephalidae.

It is native to the Albertine Rift montane forests.

Its name commemorates Austrian zoologist Rudolf Grauer, who collected natural history specimens in the Belgian Congo.
