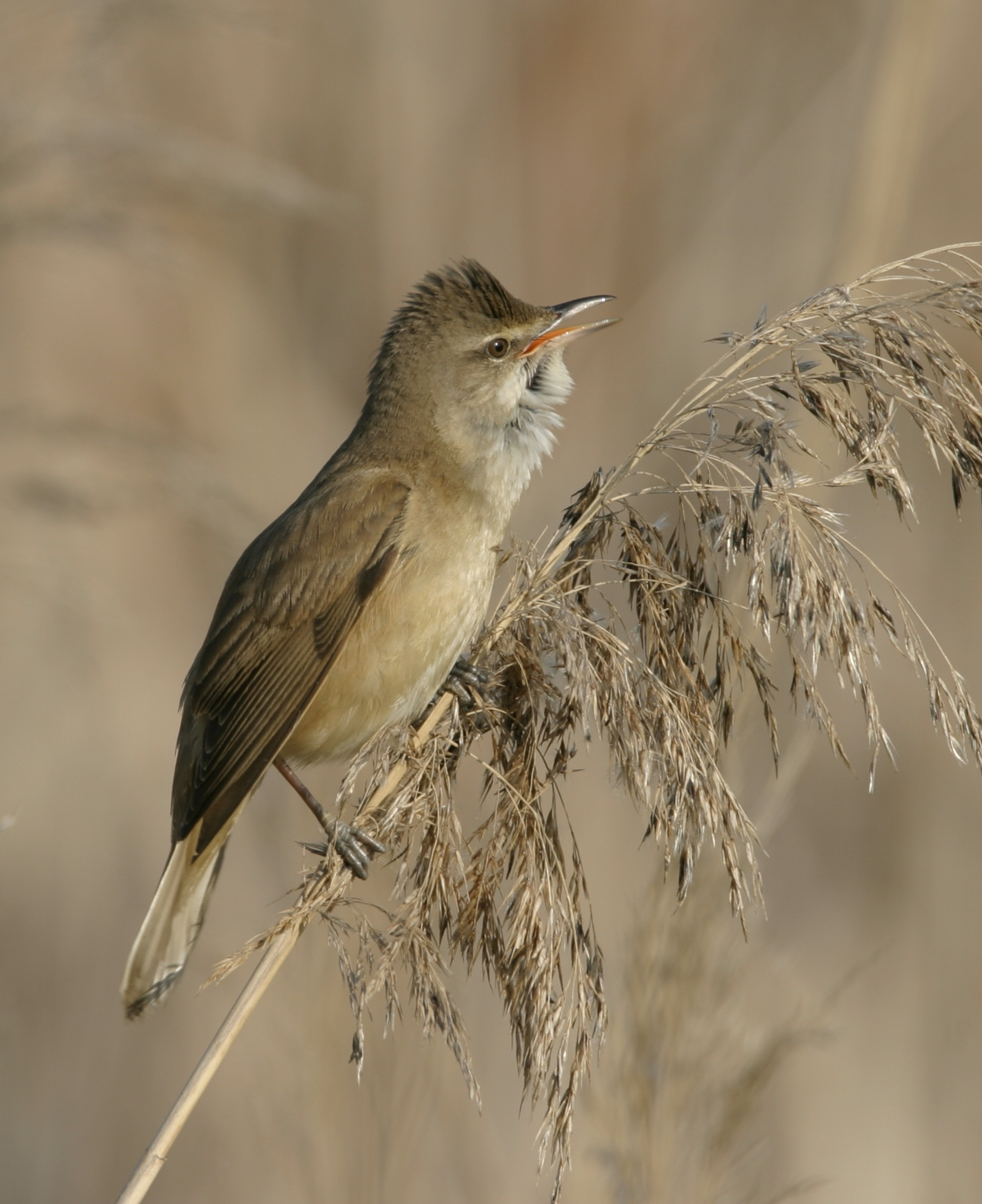
- Great reed warbler, Acrocephalus arundinaceus

Scientific classification
- Kingdom: Animalia
- Phylum: Chordata
- Class: Aves
- Order: Passeriformes
- Family: Acrocephalidae
- Genus: Acrocephalus; J. A. Naumann and J. F. Naumann, 1811

Type species
- Turdus arundinaceus Linnaeus, 1758

Species
- See text

= Acrocephalus (bird) =

Genus of birds

The Acrocephalus warblers are small, insectivorous passerine birds belonging to the genus Acrocephalus. Formerly in the paraphyletic Old World warbler assemblage, they are now separated as the namesake of the marsh and tree warbler family Acrocephalidae. They are sometimes called marsh warblers or reed warblers, but this invites confusion with marsh warbler and reed warbler.

These are rather drab brownish warblers usually associated with marshes or other wetlands. Some are streaked, others plain. Many species breeding in temperate regions are migratory.

This genus has heavily diversified into many species throughout islands across the tropical Pacific. This in turn has led to many of the resulting insular endemic species to become endangered. Several of these species (including all but one of the species endemic to the Marianas and two endemic to French Polynesia) have already gone extinct.

The most enigmatic species of the genus, the large-billed reed warbler (A. orinus), was rediscovered in Thailand in March, 2006; it was found also in a remote corner of Afghanistan in the summer of 2009. Prior to these recent sightings, it had been found only once before, in 1867.

== Taxonomy ==
The genus Acrocephalus was introduced in 1811 by the German naturalist Johann Andreas Naumann and his son Johann Friedrich Naumann. The type species was designated as Turdus arundinaceus Linnaeus, 1758, by the English zoologist George Gray in 1840. This is the great reed warbler. Many species have a flat head profile, which gives rise to the genus name, Acrocephalus from Ancient Greek akros, "highest", and kephale, "head". It is possible that the Naumanns thought akros meant "sharp-pointed".

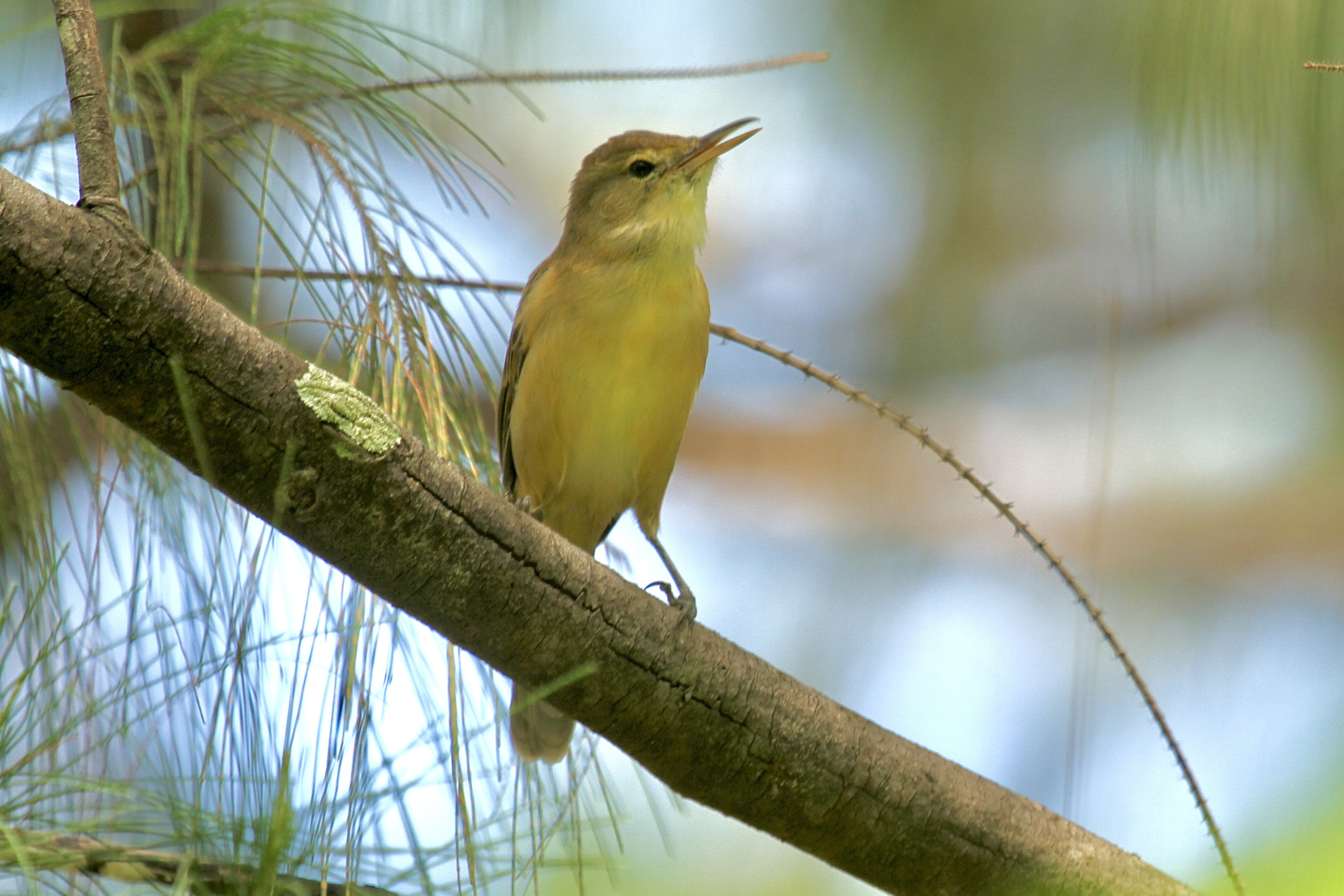
Nauru reed warbler

== List of species in taxonomic order ==
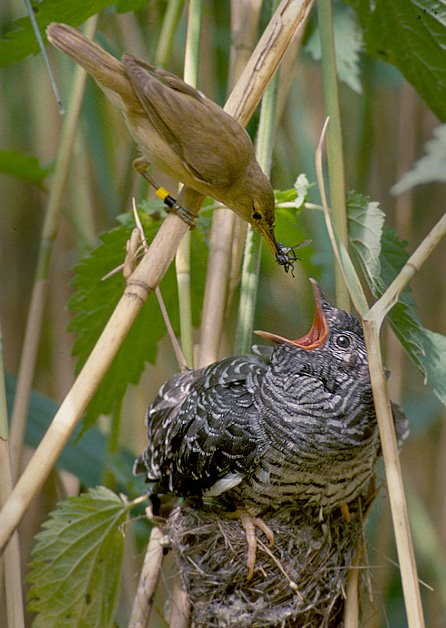
This Eurasian reed warbler is raising the young of a common cuckoo.

The genus contains 42 species of which 6 insular forms are now extinct:

Image	Common name	Scientific name
	Bokikokiko	Acrocephalus aequinoctialis
	Paddyfield warbler	Acrocephalus agricola
	Great reed warbler	Acrocephalus arundinaceus
	† Mangareva reed warbler	Acrocephalus astrolabii (extinct in the mid-19th century)
	Tuamotu reed warbler	Acrocephalus atyphus
	Australian reed warbler	Acrocephalus australis
	Black-browed reed warbler	Acrocephalus bistrigiceps
	Cape Verde warbler	Acrocephalus brevipennis
	Tahiti reed warbler	Acrocephalus caffer
	Blunt-winged warbler	Acrocephalus concinens
	Blyth's reed warbler	Acrocephalus dumetorum
	Millerbird	Acrocephalus familiaris
	Lesser swamp warbler	Acrocephalus gracilirostris
	Basra reed warbler	Acrocephalus griseldis
	Saipan reed warbler	Acrocephalus hiwae
	Cook reed warbler	Acrocephalus kerearako
	Moorea reed warbler	Acrocephalus longirostris
	† Nightingale reed warbler	Acrocephalus luscinius (extinct since 1969)
	Moustached warbler	Acrocephalus melanopogon
	Southern Marquesan reed warbler	Acrocephalus mendanae
	† Garrett's reed warbler	Acrocephalus musae (extinct, possibly in the 19th century)
	Madagascar swamp warbler	Acrocephalus newtoni
	† Aguiguan reed warbler	Acrocephalus nijoi (extinct since 1995)
	Oriental reed warbler	Acrocephalus orientalis
	Large-billed reed warbler	Acrocephalus orinus
	Aquatic warbler	Acrocephalus paludicola
	Marsh warbler	Acrocephalus palustris
	Northern Marquesan reed warbler	Acrocephalus percernis
	Nauru reed warbler	Acrocephalus rehsei
	Rimatara reed warbler	Acrocephalus rimitarae
	Rodrigues warbler	Acrocephalus rodericanus
	Greater swamp warbler	Acrocephalus rufescens
	Sedge warbler	Acrocephalus schoenobaenus
	Common reed warbler	Acrocephalus scirpaceus
	Seychelles warbler	Acrocephalus sechellensis
	Speckled reed warbler	Acrocephalus sorghophilus
	Clamorous reed warbler	Acrocephalus stentoreus
	Caroline reed warbler	Acrocephalus syrinx
	Henderson reed warbler	Acrocephalus taiti
	Manchurian reed warbler	Acrocephalus tangorum (sometimes included in A. agricola)
	Pitcairn reed warbler	Acrocephalus vaughani
	† Pagan reed warbler	Acrocephalus yamashinae (extinct by the late 1970s)

Fragmentary fossil remains from the Late Miocene (about 11 mya) of Rudabánya (NE Hungary) show some apomorphies typical of this genus. Given its rather early age (most Passerida genera are not known until the Pliocene), it is not too certain that it is correctly placed here, but it is highly likely to belong to the Acrocephalidae at the least.
