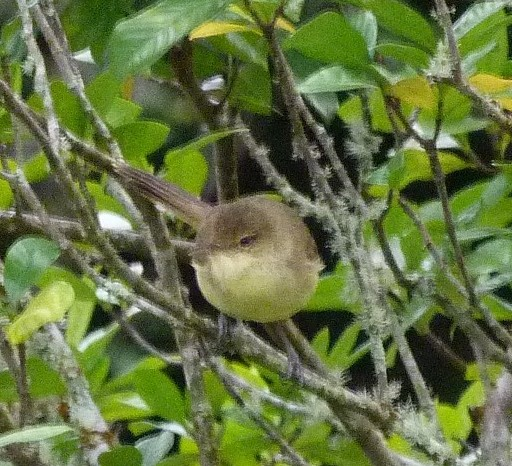
- On Mangaia, Cook Islands

Conservation status
- Least Concern (IUCN 3.1)

Scientific classification
- Kingdom: Animalia
- Phylum: Chordata
- Class: Aves
- Order: Passeriformes
- Family: Acrocephalidae
- Genus: Acrocephalus
- Species: A. kerearako

Binomial name
- Acrocephalus kerearako Holyoak, 1974
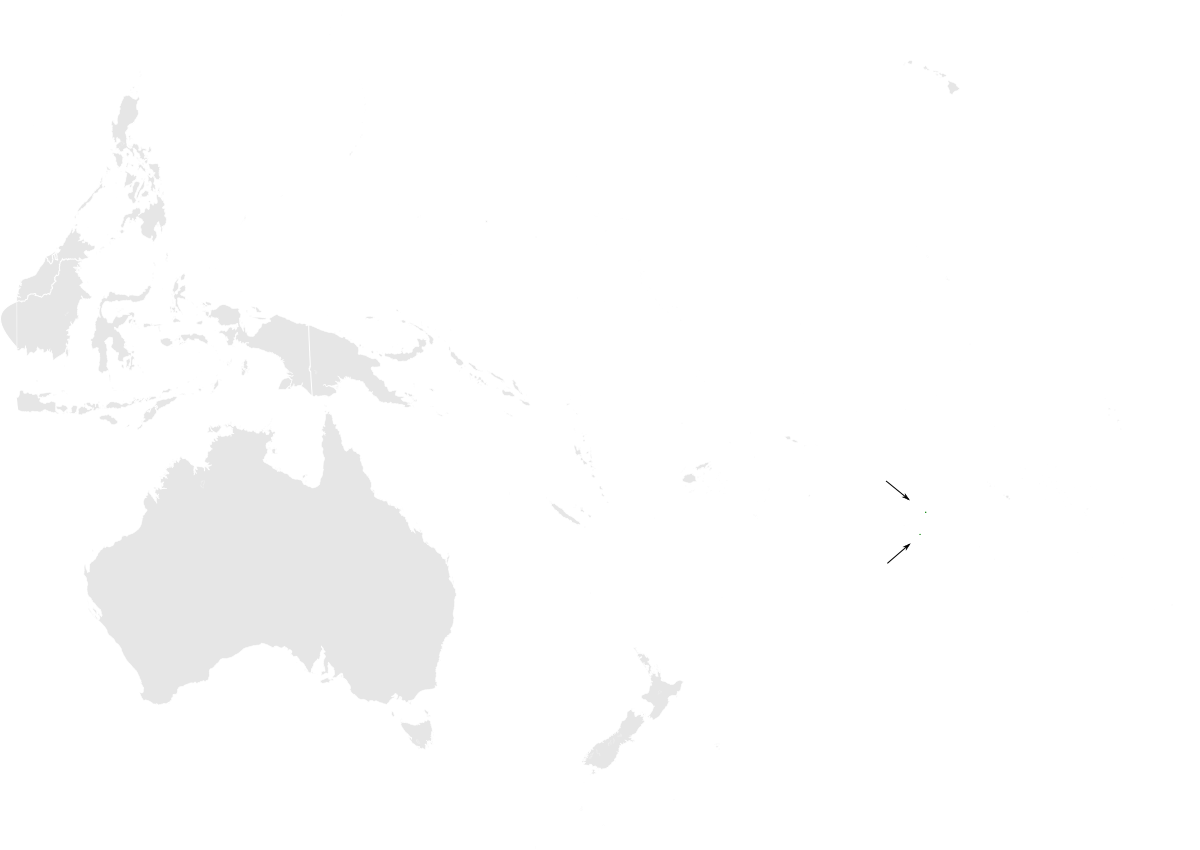

Synonyms
- Acrocephalus vaughani kerearako Holyoak, 1974; Acrocephalus vaughani kaoko Holyoak, 1974

= Cook Islands reed warbler =

Species of bird

The Cook Islands reed warbler (Acrocephalus kerearako), also known as the Cook reed warbler or Mangaia reed warbler, is a species of Old World warbler in the family Acrocephalidae endemic to the Southern Cook Islands. Its natural habitats are subtropical or tropical dry forests, swamps, and rural gardens. It is threatened by habitat loss.

== Taxonomy ==
Acrocephalus kerearako consists of the subspecies Acrocephalus kerearako kerearako and Acrocephalus kerearako kaoko, both first described in 1974 by David Thomas Holyoak, then as subspecies of Acrocephalus vaughani and subsequently being moved to their own species. The type localities for the subspecies corresponds to the islands they're found on, A. k. kerearako on Mangaia and A. k. kaoko on Mitiaro, the types being males collected by Holyoak in 1973. The specific names kerearako and kaoko are the names used by the people of the island each subspecies is found on.

== Description ==
The subspecies have a high degree of similarity. Their bodies, wings and tails are mostly coloured olive above and yellow – slightly paler A. k. kaoko — undearneath, with details of brown, grey and tawny. There are also various other minor differences in the colouration patterns of the subspecies. Their tails are about 76–80 mm (3.0–3.1 in) long. Their beaks are black with mostly pink mandibles and culmens about 15.5–17.5 mm (0.61–0.69 in) long. A. k. kaoko is slightly larger than A. k. kerearako, with wings about 78–80 mm (3.1–3.1 in) and 76–78 mm (3.0–3.1 in) long respectively. Their tarsometatarsi are about 27.5–29 mm (1.08–1.14 in) long and their feet are blue-grey. They are also described as good singers.

== Distribution and habitat ==
Acrocephalus kerearako is endemic to the Southern Cook Islands, A. k. kerearako only being found on the southernmost island of Mangaia and A. k. kaoko only being found on Mitiaro. They are a common species on the islands, found in bushes and trees and in a variety of habitats, such as reeds, gardens and woodland. The 2024 IUCN Red List assessment of the species discussed deforestation, the introduced Acridotheres tristis, Polynesian rat and black rat as potential threats, but noted that the Acrocephalus kerearako is still common on the islands despite of this, and listed it as a least-concern species.
