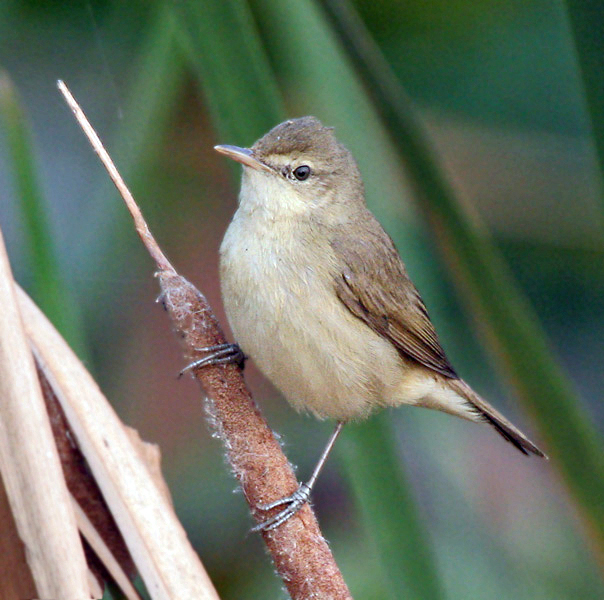
- At Nalban in Kolkata, West Bengal, India

Conservation status
- Least Concern (IUCN 3.1)

Scientific classification
- Kingdom: Animalia
- Phylum: Chordata
- Class: Aves
- Order: Passeriformes
- Family: Acrocephalidae
- Genus: Acrocephalus
- Species: A. concinens

Binomial name
- Acrocephalus concinens (R. Swinhoe, 1870)

Subspecies
- A. c. haringtoni - Witherby, 1920; A. c. stevensi - Baker, ECS, 1922; A. c. concinens - (Swinhoe, 1870)
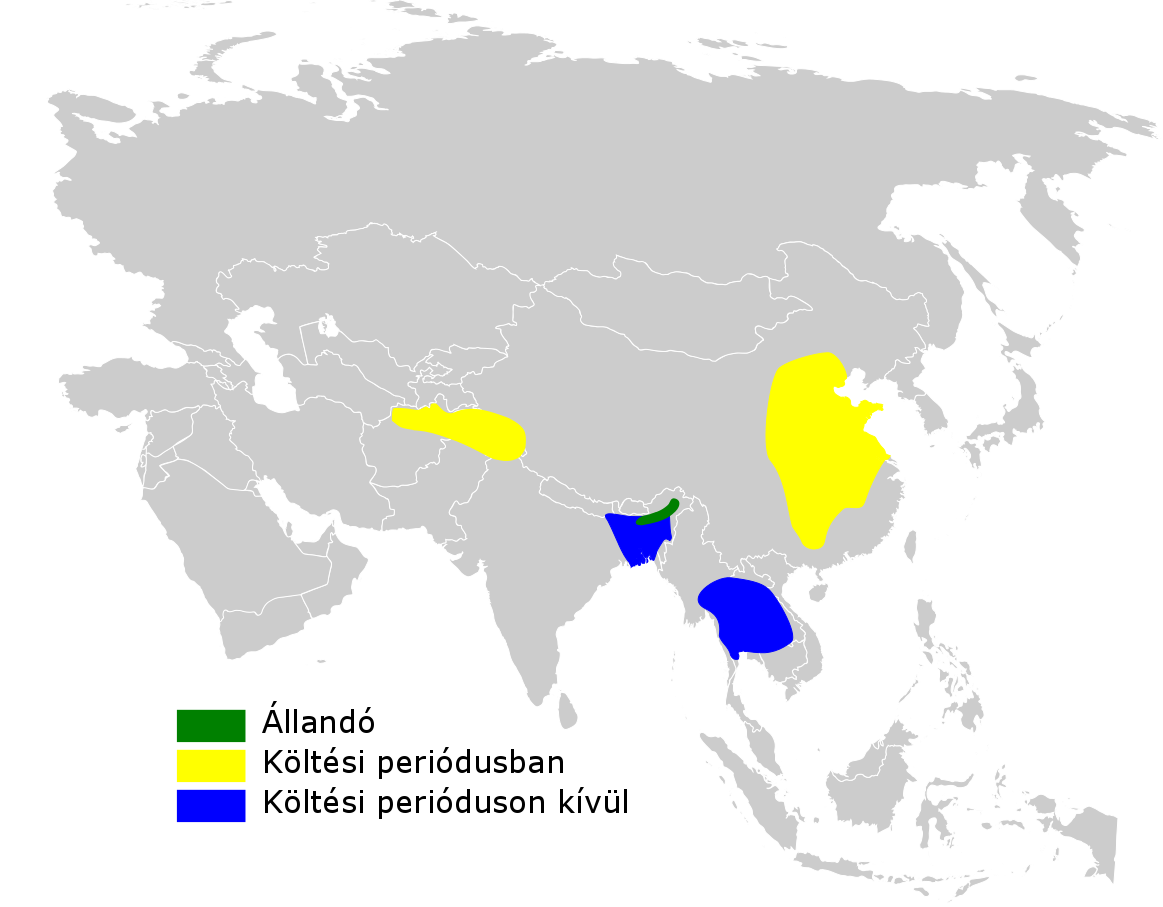
- Distribution of Blunt-winged Warbler Resident Breeding Non-breeding

= Blunt-winged warbler =

Species of bird

The blunt-winged warbler (Acrocephalus concinens) is a marsh-warbler (family Acrocephalidae). The species was first described by Robert Swinhoe in 1870. It was formerly included in the "Old World warbler" assemblage.

It is found in Afghanistan, Pakistan, Northeast India and China; it winters in Myanmar, Thailand and Bangladesh.

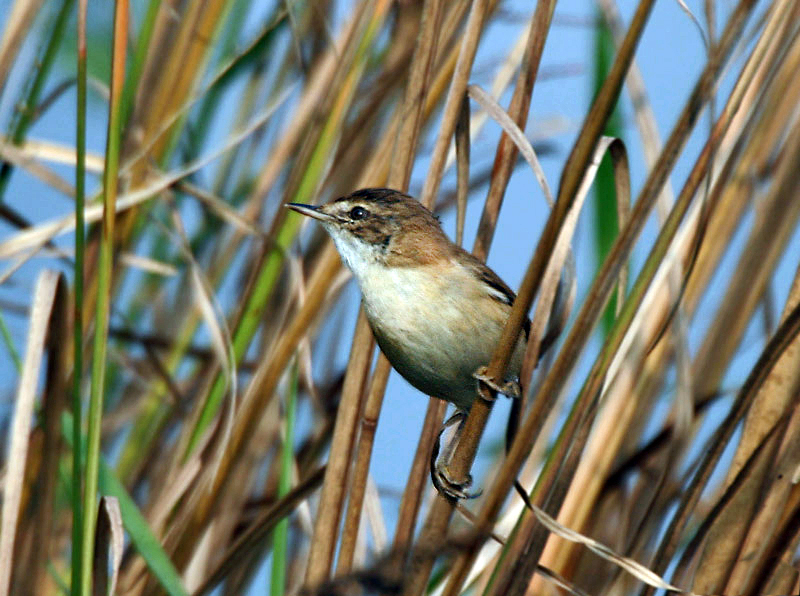
At Joka in Kolkata, West Bengal, India
