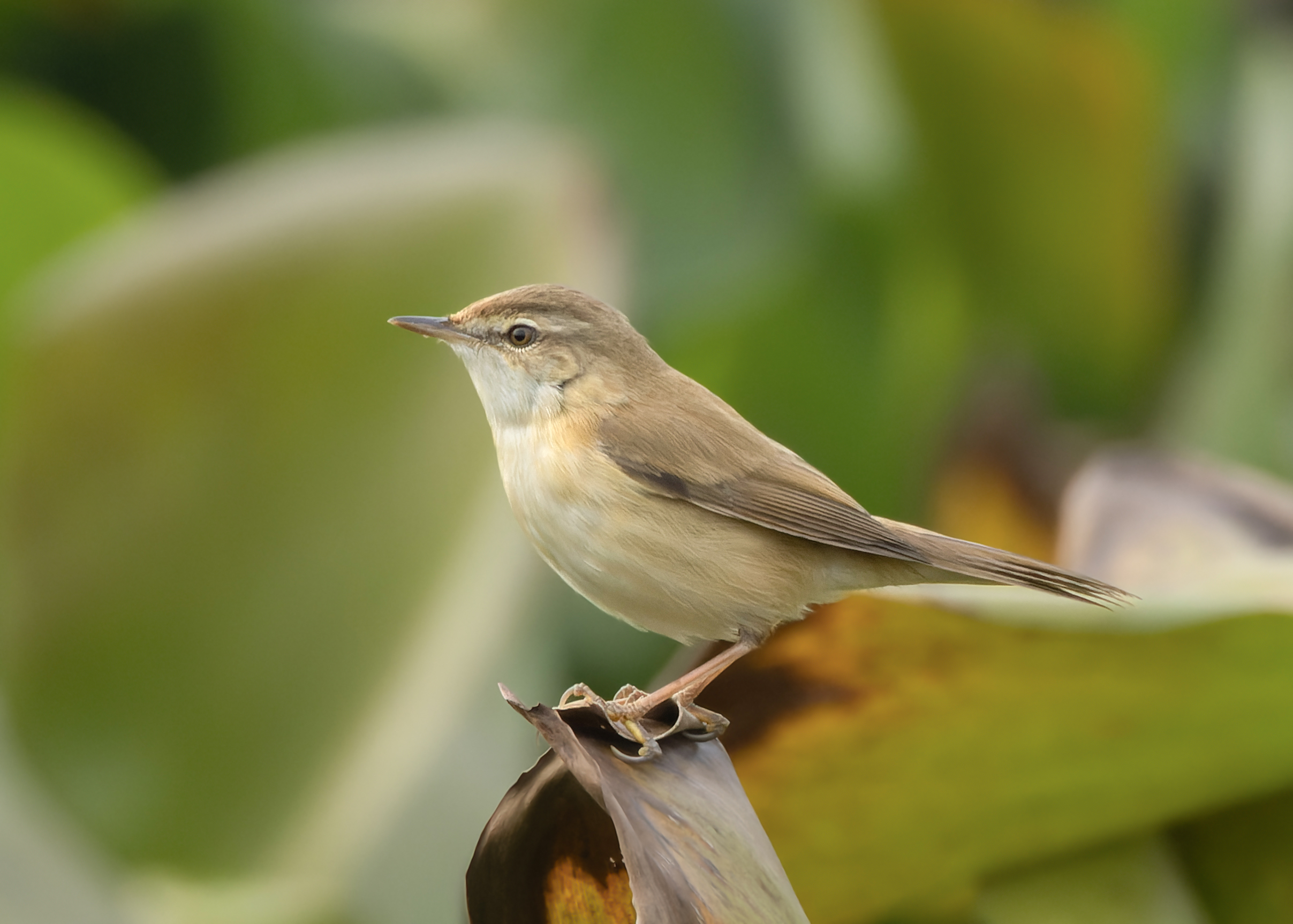
- Acrocephalus dumetorum in Baruipur, West Bengal, India.

Conservation status
- Least Concern (IUCN 3.1)

Scientific classification
- Kingdom: Animalia
- Phylum: Chordata
- Class: Aves
- Order: Passeriformes
- Family: Acrocephalidae
- Genus: Acrocephalus
- Species: A. dumetorum

Binomial name
- Acrocephalus dumetorum Blyth, 1849
- Range of A. dumetorum Breeding Non-breeding

= Blyth's reed warbler =

Species of bird

Blyth's reed warbler (Acrocephalus dumetorum) is a species of reed warbler belonging to the family Acrocephalidae, which also includes the tree warblers. Blyth's reed warbler breeds across the Palearctic zoogeographical region and winters in South Asia. The species has been expanding its range westwards in Europe.

== Taxonomy ==
Blyth's reed warbler was first formally described in 1849 by the English zoologist Edward Blyth with its type locality given as India. It is classified in the reed warbler genus Acrocephalus which was formerly included in the polyphyletic family Sylviidae but is now included in the family Acrocephalidae.

== Etymology ==
Blyth's reed warbler is named in honour of Edward Blyth, its describer. The genus name Acrocephalus is from Ancient Greek akros, "highest", and kephale, "head". It is possible that Naumann and Naumann thought akros meant "sharp-pointed". The specific dumetorum is from Latin dumetum, "thicket".

== Description ==
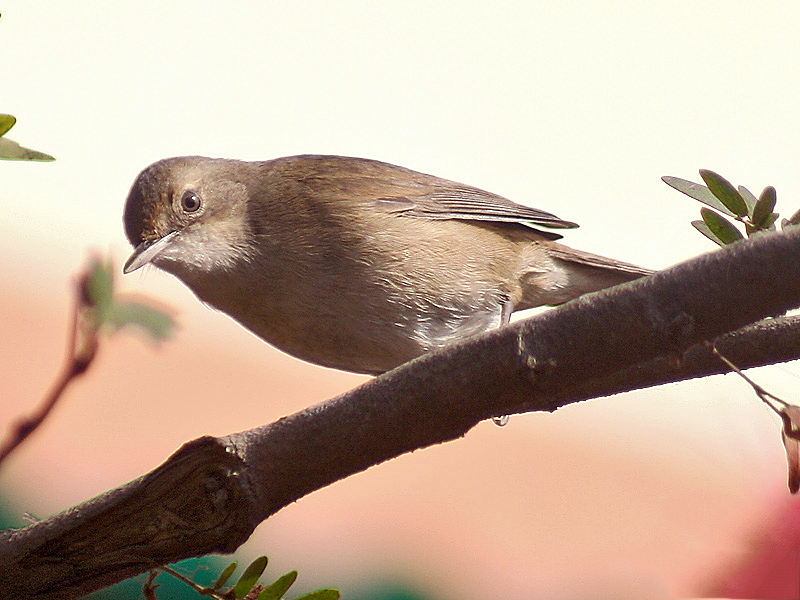
At New Alipore in Kolkata, West Bengal, India.

Blyth's reed warbler is between 12 and 14 cm (4.7 and 5.5 in) in length and weighs between 8 and 16 g (0.28 and 0.56 oz). It is a slim warbler with relatively short wings and a long bill. The plumage is rather plain with few distinguishing features and has been described as lacking in "warmer" tones observed in related species. The upperparts are plain olive brown, with less olive on the short, rounded wings. There is a short whitish supercilium running between the base of the bill and the eye, with a dusky stripe through the eye. The underparts are plain and off-white in colour. The rather long, thick bill is greyish brown with a pale pinkish-brown base on the lower mandible, which is the colour of the feet and legs.

== Vocalisations ==
Blyth's reed warbler has a variable song in which harsh sounds like ticks, chaks and churrs are mixed in with melodious whistles and mimicry.

== Distribution and habitat ==
Blyth's reed warbler breeds from the Baltic Sea in eastern Europe almost as far as Lake Baikal in Siberia, with a southern isolated population in Central Asia. It winters in India, Sri Lanka, Nepal, Bangladesh and Myanmar. This species was a rare vagrant to western Europe, although it has been spreading and increasing in numbers in the region, and was found to have bred in the Netherlands in 2022 and in Scotland in 2024.

In the breeding season, the species prefers the edges of, and clearings within, damp broadleaved woodland, as well as wooded gullies, parks and gardens, scrub and coniferous forest. In the winter, it is found in trees in both wet and dry habitats.

== Biology ==
Blyth's reed warbler breeds between late May and July. They are typically monogamous, but polygyny has been recorded. They are solitary and territorial; in Finland territories are between 600 and 1,300 m^{2} (6,500 and 14,000 sq ft). The pair builds a nest that is a compact cup made up of plant material and spiders' webs and place it 20 to 60 cm (7.9 to 23.6 in) above the ground. Between 3 and 6 eggs are laid, and both the male and the female (but predominantly the female) incubate them for 12 to 13 days. The chicks are fed by both parents, and fledging occurs when the chicks are 11 to 13 days old. They remain dependent on their parents for a further 10 to 22 days. The male will on occasion leave the brood after they have fledged; when this happens he is likely looking for another female to breed with, and the first female is left to care for the first brood by herself.
