= Rimatara reed warbler =

Conservation status
- Critically Endangered (IUCN 3.1)

Scientific classification
- Kingdom: Animalia
- Phylum: Chordata
- Class: Aves
- Order: Passeriformes
- Family: Acrocephalidae
- Genus: Acrocephalus
- Species: A. rimitarae

Binomial name
- Acrocephalus rimitarae (Murphy & Mathews, 1929)
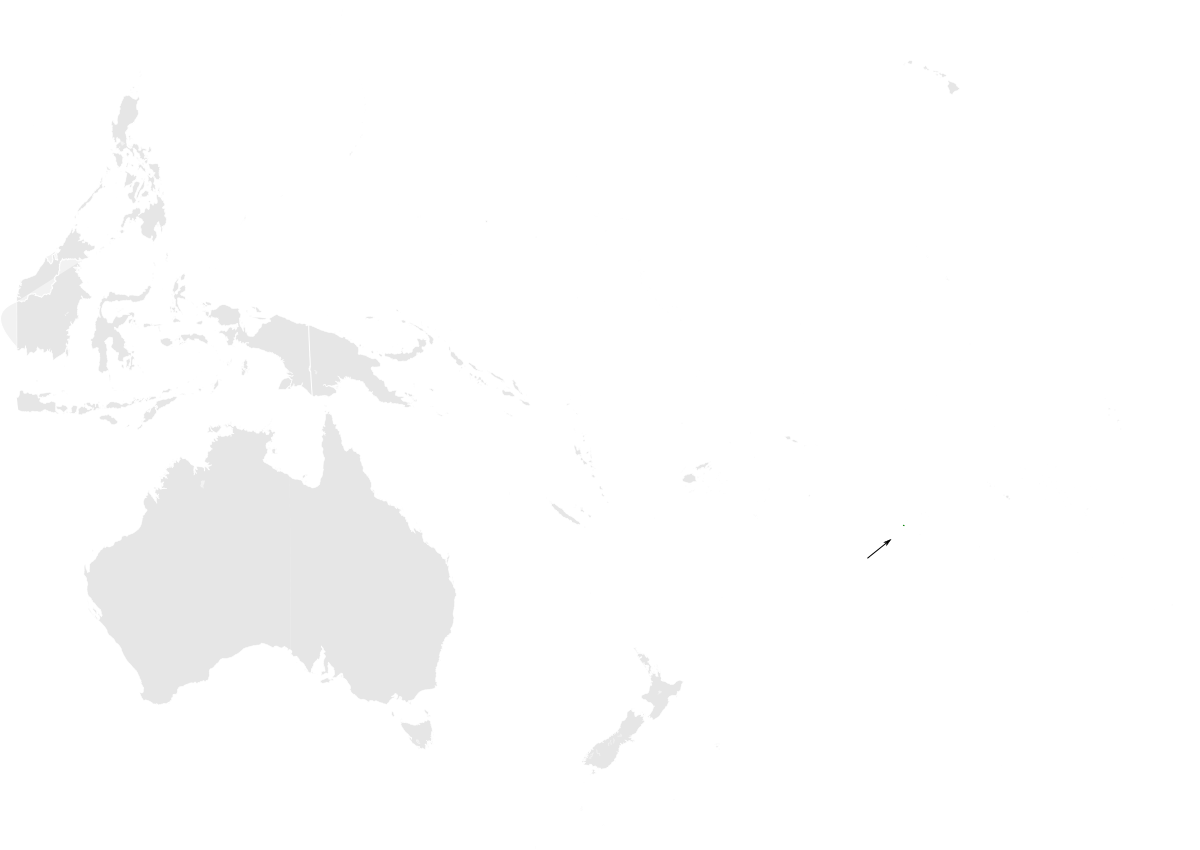

Synonyms
- Acrocephalus rimatarae

Species of bird

The Rimatara reed warbler (Acrocephalus rimitarae) is a species of Old World warbler in the family Acrocephalidae. It is found only in Rimatara in French Polynesia. Its natural habitats are subtropical or tropical dry forests and swamps. Due to its limited geographic distribution, this bird is classified as critically endangered on the International Union for Conservation of Nature (IUCN) Red List of Threatened Species.
