= List of birds of the Federated States of Micronesia =

This is a list of the bird species recorded in Micronesia. The avifauna of the Federated States of Micronesia include a total of 240 species, of which 22 are endemic, and 13 have been introduced. Of those species, 24 are globally threatened.

This list's taxonomic treatment (designation and sequence of orders, families and species) and nomenclature (common and scientific names) follow the conventions of The Clements Checklist of Birds of the World, 2022 edition. The family accounts at the beginning of each heading reflect this taxonomy, as do the species counts found in each family account. Introduced and accidental species are included in the total counts for Micronesia.

The following tags have been used to highlight several categories. The commonly occurring native species do not fall into any of these categories.

- (A) Accidental - a species that rarely or accidentally occurs in Micronesia
- (E) Endemic - a species endemic to Micronesia
- (I) Introduced - a species introduced to Micronesia as a consequence, direct or indirect, of human actions
- (EW) Extinct in the wild
- (Ex) Extinct

== Ducks, geese, and waterfowl ==
Order: Anseriformes Family: Anatidae

Anatidae includes the ducks and most duck-like waterfowl, such as geese and swans. These birds are adapted to an aquatic existence with webbed feet, flattened bills, and feathers that are excellent at shedding water due to an oily coating.

- Snow goose, Chen caerulescens (A)
- Cackling goose, Branta hutchinsii (A)
- Canada goose, Branta canadensis (A)
- Garganey, Spatula querquedula (A)
- Northern shoveler, Spatula clypeata
- Gadwall, Mareca strepera (A)
- Eurasian wigeon, Mareca penelope
- American wigeon, Mareca americana (A)
- Pacific black duck, Anas superciliosa
- Mallard, Anas platyrhynchos (A)
- Northern pintail, Anas acuta
- Green-winged teal, Anas crecca
- Canvasback, Aythya valisineria (A)
- Redhead, Aythya americana
- Common pochard, Aythya ferina (A)
- Tufted duck, Aythya fuligula
- Greater scaup, Aythya marila

== Megapodes ==
Order: Galliformes Family: Megapodiidae

The Megapodiidae are stocky, medium-large chicken-like birds with small heads and large feet. All but the malleefowl occupy jungle habitats and most have brown or black coloring.

- Micronesian scrubfowl, Megapodius laperouse

== Pheasants, grouse, and allies ==
Order: Galliformes Family: Phasianidae

The Phasianidae are a family of terrestrial birds which consists of quails, partridges, snowcocks, francolins, spurfowls, tragopans, monals, pheasants, peafowls and jungle fowls. In general, they are plump (although they vary in size) and have broad, relatively short wings.

- Blue-breasted quail, Synoicus chinensis (I)
- Black francolin, Francolinus francolinus (I)
- Red junglefowl, Gallus gallus (I)

== Pigeons and doves ==
Order: Columbiformes Family: Columbidae

Pigeons and doves are stout-bodied birds with short necks and short slender bills with a fleshy cere.

- Rock pigeon, Columba livia (I)
- Philippine collared-dove, Streptopelia dusumieri (I)
- Shy ground dove, Alopecoenas stairi (I)
- Caroline Islands ground dove, Alopecoenas kubaryi (E)
- White-throated ground dove, Alopecoenas xanthonurus
- Nicobar pigeon, Caloenas nicobarica
- Purple-capped fruit-dove, Ptilinopus ponapensis (E)
- Kosrae fruit-dove, Ptilinopus hernsheimi (E)
- Crimson-crowned fruit-dove, Ptilinopus porphyraceus
- Mariana fruit-dove, Ptilinopus roseicapilla (E)
- Micronesian imperial-pigeon, Ducula oceanica

== Cuckoos ==
Order: Cuculiformes Family: Cuculidae

The family Cuculidae includes cuckoos, roadrunners and anis. These birds are of variable size with slender bodies, long tails and strong legs. The Old World cuckoos are brood parasites.

- Chestnut-winged cuckoo, Clamator coromandus (A)
- Long-tailed koel, Urodynamis taitensis
- Shining bronze-cuckoo, Chrysococcyx lucidus (A)
- Brush cuckoo, Cacomantis variolosus (A)
- Northern hawk-cuckoo, Hierococcyx hyperythrus (A)
- Hodgson's hawk-cuckoo, Hierococcyx nisicolor (A)
- Common cuckoo, Cuculus canorus (A)
- Oriental cuckoo, Cuculus optatus

== Swifts ==
Order: Caprimulgiformes Family: Apodidae

Swifts are small birds which spend the majority of their lives flying. These birds have very short legs and never settle voluntarily on the ground, perching instead only on vertical surfaces. Many swifts have long swept-back wings which resemble a crescent or boomerang.

- Uniform swiftlet, Aerodramus vanikorensis
- Mariana swiftlet, Aerodramus bartschi (E)
- Caroline Islands swiftlet, Aerodramus inquietus (E)
- Pacific swift, Apus pacificus (A)

== Rails, gallinules, and coots ==
Order: Gruiformes Family: Rallidae

Rallidae is a large family of small to medium-sized birds which includes the rails, crakes, coots and gallinules. Typically they inhabit dense vegetation in damp environments near lakes, swamps or rivers. In general they are shy and secretive birds, making them difficult to observe. Most species have strong legs and long toes which are well adapted to soft uneven surfaces. They tend to have short, rounded wings and to be weak fliers.

- Buff-banded rail, Gallirallus philippensis
- Eurasian moorhen, Gallinula chloropus
- Eurasian coot, Fulica atra (A)
- Black-backed swamphen, Porphyrio indicus
- Australasian swamphen, Porphyrio melanotus
- Pale-vented bush-hen, Amaurornis moluccana (A)
- White-browed crake, Poliolimnas cinereus
- Red-legged crake, Rallina fasciata (A)
- Slaty-legged crake, Rallina eurizonoides
- Spotless crake, Zapornia tabuensis
- Kosrae crake, Zapornia monasa (E) (Ex)

== Stilts and avocets ==
Order: Charadriiformes Family: Recurvirostridae

Recurvirostridae is a family of large wading birds, which includes the avocets and stilts. The avocets have long legs and long up-curved bills. The stilts have extremely long legs and long, thin, straight bills.

- Black-winged stilt, Himantopus himantopus
- Pied stilt, Himantopus leucocephalus (A)
- Black-necked stilt, Himantopus mexicanus (A)

== Oystercatchers ==
Order: Charadriiformes Family: Haematopodidae

The oystercatchers are large and noisy plover-like birds, with strong bills used for smashing or prising open molluscs.

- Eurasian oystercatcher, Haematopus ostralegus (A)

== Plovers and lapwings ==
Order: Charadriiformes Family: Charadriidae

The family Charadriidae includes the plovers, dotterels and lapwings. They are small to medium-sized birds with compact bodies, short, thick necks and long, usually pointed, wings. They are found in open country worldwide, mostly in habitats near water.

- Black-bellied plover, Pluvialis squatarola
- Pacific golden-plover, Pluvialis fulva
- Lesser sand-plover, Charadrius mongolus
- Greater sand-plover, Charadrius leschenaultii
- Kentish plover, Charadrius alexandrinus (A)
- Common ringed plover, Charadrius hiaticula (A)
- Little ringed plover, Charadrius dubius (A)
- Oriental plover, Charadrius veredus (A)

== Sandpipers and allies ==
Order: Charadriiformes Family: Scolopacidae

Scolopacidae is a large diverse family of small to medium-sized shorebirds including the sandpipers, curlews, godwits, shanks, tattlers, woodcocks, snipes, dowitchers and phalaropes. The majority of these species eat small invertebrates picked out of the mud or soil. Variation in length of legs and bills enables multiple species to feed in the same habitat, particularly on the coast, without direct competition for food.

- Bristle-thighed curlew, Numenius tahitiensis
- Whimbrel, Numenius phaeopus
- Little curlew, Numenius minutus (A)
- Far Eastern curlew, Numenius madagascariensis
- Eurasian curlew, Numenius arquata (A)
- Bar-tailed godwit, Limosa lapponica
- Black-tailed godwit, Limosa limosa
- Ruddy turnstone, Arenaria interpres
- Great knot, Calidris tenuirostris (A)
- Red knot, Calidris canutus (A)
- Ruff, Calidris pugnax
- Broad-billed sandpiper, Calidris falcinellus (A)
- Sharp-tailed sandpiper, Calidris acuminata
- Curlew sandpiper, Calidris ferruginea
- Temminck's stint, Calidris temminckii (A)
- Long-toed stint, Calidris subminuta
- Red-necked stint, Calidris ruficollis
- Sanderling, Calidris alba
- Dunlin, Calidris alpina (A)
- Buff-breasted sandpiper, Calidris subruficollis (A)
- Pectoral sandpiper, Calidris melanotos
- Latham's snipe, Gallinago hardwickii (A)
- Common snipe, Gallinago gallinago (A)
- Swinhoe's snipe, Gallinago megala
- Terek sandpiper, Xenus cinereus
- Red phalarope, Phalaropus fulicarius (A)
- Common sandpiper, Actitis hypoleucos
- Spotted sandpiper, Actitis macularia (A)
- Gray-tailed tattler, Tringa brevipes
- Wandering tattler, Tringa incana
- Spotted redshank, Tringa erythropus (A)
- Greater yellowlegs, Tringa melanoleuca (A)
- Common greenshank, Tringa nebularia
- Nordmann's greenshank, Tringa guttifer (A)
- Marsh sandpiper, Tringa stagnatilis
- Wood sandpiper, Tringa glareola
- Common redshank, Tringa totanus

== Pratincoles and coursers ==
Order: Charadriiformes Family: Glareolidae

Glareolidae is a family of wading birds comprising the pratincoles, which have short legs, long pointed wings and long forked tails, and the coursers, which have long legs, short wings and long pointed bills which curve downwards.

- Oriental pratincole, Glareola maldivarum (A)

== Skuas and jaegers ==
Order: Charadriiformes Family: Stercorariidae

The family Stercorariidae are, in general, medium to large birds, typically with gray or brown plumage, often with white markings on the wings. They nest on the ground in temperate and arctic regions and are long-distance migrants.

- South polar skua, Stercorarius maccormicki (A)
- Pomarine jaeger, Stercorarius pomarinus
- Parasitic jaeger, Stercorarius parasiticus (A)
- Long-tailed jaeger, Stercorarius longicaudus (A)

== Gulls, terns, and skimmers ==
Order: Charadriiformes Family: Laridae

Laridae is a family of medium to large seabirds, the gulls, terns, and skimmers. Gulls are typically gray or white, often with black markings on the head or wings. They have stout, longish bills and webbed feet. Terns are a group of generally medium to large seabirds typically with gray or white plumage, often with black markings on the head. Most terns hunt fish by diving but some pick insects off the surface of fresh water. Terns are generally long-lived birds, with several species known to live in excess of 30 years.

- Black-headed gull, Chroicocephalus ridibundus
- Laughing gull, Leucophaeus atricilla (A)
- Franklin's gull, Leucophaeus pipixcan (A)
- Herring gull, Larus argentatus (A)
- Brown noddy, Anous stolidus
- Black noddy, Anous minutus
- Blue-gray noddy, Anous ceruleus
- White tern, Gygis alba
- Sooty tern, Onychoprion fuscatus
- Gray-backed tern, Onychoprion lunatus
- Bridled tern, Onychoprion anaethetus
- Little tern, Sternula albifrons
- Gull-billed tern, Gelochelidon nilotica (A)
- White-winged tern, Chlidonias leucopterus
- Whiskered tern, Chlidonias hybrida (A)
- Black-naped tern, Sterna sumatrana
- Common tern, Sterna hirundo
- Arctic tern, Sterna paradisaea (A)
- Great crested tern, Thalasseus bergii

== Tropicbirds ==
Order: Phaethontiformes Family: Phaethontidae

Tropicbirds are slender white birds of tropical oceans, with exceptionally long central tail feathers. Their heads and long wings have black markings.

- White-tailed tropicbird, Phaethon lepturus
- Red-tailed tropicbird, Phaethon rubricauda

== Albatrosses ==
Order: Procellariiformes Family: Diomedeidae

The albatrosses are among the largest of flying birds, and the great albatrosses from the genus Diomedea have the largest wingspans of any extant birds.

- Laysan albatross, Phoebastria immutabilis (A)
- Black-footed albatross, Phoebastria nigripes
- Short-tailed albatross, Phoebastria albatrus

== Southern storm-petrels ==
Order: Procellariiformes Family: Oceanitidae

The southern storm-petrels are relatives of the petrels and are the smallest seabirds. They feed on planktonic crustaceans and small fish picked from the surface, typically while hovering. The flight is fluttering and sometimes bat-like.

- Wilson's storm-petrel, Oceanites oceanicus (A)
- Polynesian storm-petrel, Nesofregetta fuliginosa

== Northern storm-petrels ==
Order: Procellariiformes Family: Hydrobatidae

Though the members of this family are similar in many respects to the southern storm-petrels, including their general appearance and habits, there are enough genetic differences to warrant their placement in a separate family.

- Leach's storm-petrel, Hydrobates leucorhous
- Band-rumped storm-petrel, Hydrobates castro (A)
- Matsudaira's storm-petrel, Hydrobates matsudairae

== Shearwaters and petrels ==
Order: Procellariiformes Family: Procellariidae

The procellariids are the main group of medium-sized "true petrels", characterized by united nostrils with medium septum and a long outer functional primary.

- Kermadec petrel, Pterodroma neglecta (A)
- Juan Fernandez petrel, Pterodroma externa
- White-necked petrel, Pterodroma cervicalis (A)
- Bonin petrel, Pterodroma hypoleuca
- Black-winged petrel, Pterodroma nigripennis
- Stejneger's petrel, Pterodroma longirostris (A)
- Bulwer's petrel, Bulweria bulwerii (A)
- Tahiti petrel, Pseudobulweria rostrata (A)
- Streaked shearwater, Calonectris leucomelas (A)
- Flesh-footed shearwater, Ardenna carneipes (A)
- Wedge-tailed shearwater, Ardenna pacificus
- Buller's shearwater, Ardenna bulleri (A)
- Sooty shearwater, Ardenna griseus (A)
- Short-tailed shearwater, Ardenna tenuirostris
- Christmas shearwater, Puffinus nativitatis
- Newell's shearwater, Puffinus newelli (A)
- Tropical shearwater, Puffinus bailloni

== Frigatebirds ==
Order: Suliformes Family: Fregatidae

Frigatebirds are large seabirds usually found over tropical oceans. They are large, black and white or completely black, with long wings and deeply forked tails. The males have colored inflatable throat pouches. They do not swim or walk and cannot take off from a flat surface. Having the largest wingspan-to-body-weight ratio of any bird, they are essentially aerial, able to stay aloft for more than a week.

- Lesser frigatebird, Fregata ariel (A)
- Great frigatebird, Fregata minor

== Boobies and gannets ==
Order: Suliformes Family: Sulidae

The sulids comprise the gannets and boobies. Both groups are medium to large coastal seabirds that plunge-dive for fish.

- Masked booby, Sula dactylatra
- Brown booby, Sula leucogaster
- Red-footed booby, Sula sula

== Cormorants and shags ==
Order: Suliformes Family: Phalacrocoracidae

Phalacrocoracidae is a family of medium to large coastal, fish-eating seabirds that includes cormorants and shags. Plumage coloration varies, with the majority having mainly dark plumage, some species being black-and-white and a few being colorful.

- Little pied cormorant, Microcarbo melanoleucos
- Great cormorant, Phalacrocorax carbo (A)

== Pelicans ==
Order: Pelecaniformes Family: Pelecanidae

Pelicans are large water birds with a distinctive pouch under their beak. As with other members of the order Pelecaniformes, they have webbed feet with four toes.

- Australian pelican, Pelecanus conspicillatus (A)

== Herons, egrets, and bitterns ==
Order: Pelecaniformes Family: Ardeidae

The family Ardeidae contains the bitterns, herons, and egrets. Herons and egrets are medium to large wading birds with long necks and legs. Bitterns tend to be shorter necked and more wary. Members of Ardeidae fly with their necks retracted, unlike other long-necked birds such as storks, ibises and spoonbills.

- Yellow bittern, Ixobrychus sinensis
- Schrenck's bittern, Ixobrychus eurhythmus (A)
- Cinnamon bittern, Ixobrychus cinnamomeus (A)
- Black bittern, Ixobrychus flavicollis (A)
- Gray heron, Ardea cinerea (A)
- Great egret, Ardea alba
- Intermediate egret, Ardea intermedia (A)
- Little egret, Egretta garzetta
- Pacific reef-heron, Egretta sacra
- Cattle egret, Bubulcus ibis
- Striated heron, Butorides striata (A)
- Black-crowned night-heron, Nycticorax nycticorax (A)
- Nankeen night-heron, Nycticorax caledonicus
- Japanese night-heron, Gorsachius goisagi (A)
- Malayan night-heron, Gorsachius melanolophus (A)

== Osprey ==
Order: Accipitriformes Family: Pandionidae

The family Pandionidae contains only one species, the osprey. The osprey is a medium-large raptor which is a specialist fish-eater with a worldwide distribution.

- Osprey, Pandion haliaetus (A)

== Hawks, eagles, and kites ==
Order: Accipitriformes Family: Accipitridae

Accipitridae is a family of birds of prey, which includes hawks, eagles, kites, harriers and Old World vultures. These birds have powerful hooked beaks for tearing flesh from their prey, strong legs, powerful talons and keen eyesight.

- Gray-faced buzzard, Butastur indicus (A)
- Chinese sparrowhawk, Accipiter soloensis
- Japanese sparrowhawk, Accipiter gularis
- Brahminy kite, Haliastur indus (A)

== Owls ==
Order: Strigiformes Family: Strigidae

The typical owls are small to large solitary nocturnal birds of prey. They have large forward-facing eyes and ears, a hawk-like beak and a conspicuous circle of feathers around each eye called a facial disk.

- Short-eared owl, Asio flammeus

== Kingfishers ==
Order: Coraciiformes Family: Alcedinidae

Kingfishers are medium-sized birds with large heads, long pointed bills, short legs and stubby tails.

- Pohnpei kingfisher, Todirhamphus reichenbachii (E)
- Sacred kingfisher, Todirhamphus sanctus
- Collared kingfisher, Todirhamphus chloris

== Bee-eaters ==
Order: Coraciiformes Family: Meropidae

The bee-eaters are a group of near passerine birds in the family Meropidae. Most species are found in Africa but others occur in southern Europe, Madagascar, Australia and New Guinea. They are characterized by richly colored plumage, slender bodies and usually elongated central tail feathers. All are colorful and have long downturned bills and pointed wings, which give them a swallow-like appearance when seen from afar.

- Rainbow bee-eater, Merops ornatus

== Rollers ==
Order: Coraciiformes Family: Coraciidae

Rollers resemble crows in size and build, but are more closely related to the kingfishers and bee-eaters. They share the colorful appearance of those groups with blues and browns predominating. The two inner front toes are connected, but the outer toe is not.

- Dollarbird, Eurystomus orientalis (A)

== Falcons and caracaras ==
Order: Falconiformes Family: Falconidae

Falconidae is a family of diurnal birds of prey. They differ from hawks, eagles and kites in that they kill with their beaks instead of their talons.

- Eurasian kestrel, Falco tinnunculus (A)
- Peregrine falcon, Falco peregrinus

== Cockatoos ==
Order: Psittaciformes Family: Cacatuidae

The cockatoos share many features with other parrots including the characteristic curved beak shape and a zygodactyl foot, with two forward toes and two backwards toes. They differ, however in a number of characteristics, including the often spectacular movable headcrest.

- Sulphur-crested cockatoo, Cacatua galerita (I)

== Old World parrots ==
Order: Psittaciformes Family: Psittaculidae

Parrots are small to large birds with a characteristic curved beak. Their upper mandibles have slight mobility in the joint with the skull and they have a generally erect stance. All parrots are zygodactyl, having the four toes on each foot placed two at the front and two to the back.

- Eclectus parrot, Eclectus roratus (I)
- Pohnpei lorikeet, Trichoglossus rubiginosus (E)

== Honeyeaters ==
Order: Passeriformes Family: Meliphagidae

The honeyeaters are a large and diverse family of small to medium-sized birds most common in Australia and New Guinea. They are nectar feeders and closely resemble other nectar-feeding passerines.

- Micronesian myzomela, Myzomela rubratra

== Cuckooshrikes ==
Order: Passeriformes Family: Campephagidae

The cuckooshrikes are small to medium-sized passerine birds. They are predominantly grayish with white and black, although some species are brightly colored.

- Yap cicadabird, Edolisoma nesiotis (E)
- Pohnpei cicadabird, Edolisoma insperatum (E)

== Woodswallows, bellmagpies, and allies ==
Order: Passeriformes Family: Artamidae

The woodswallows are soft-plumaged, somber-colored passerine birds. They are smooth, agile flyers with moderately large, semi-triangular wings.

- White-breasted woodswallow, Artamus leucorynchus (A)

== Fantails ==
Order: Passeriformes Family: Rhipiduridae

The fantails are small insectivorous birds which are specialist aerial feeders.

- Micronesian rufous fantail, Rhipidura versicolor
- Pohnpei fantail, Rhipidura kubaryi (E)

== Drongos ==
Order: Passeriformes Family: Dicruridae

The drongos are mostly black or dark gray in color, sometimes with metallic tints. They have long forked tails, and some Asian species have elaborate tail decorations. They have short legs and sit very upright when perched, like a shrike. They flycatch or take prey from the ground.

- Black drongo, Dicrurus macrocercus (I)

== Monarch flycatchers ==
Order: Passeriformes Family: Monarchidae

The monarch flycatchers are small to medium-sized insectivorous passerines which hunt by flycatching.

- Chuuk monarch, Metabolus rugensis (E)
- Yap monarch, Monarcha godeffroyi (E)
- Pohnpei flycatcher, Myiagra pluto (E)
- Oceanic flycatcher, Myiagra oceanica (E)

== Shrikes ==
Order: Passeriformes Family: Laniidae

Shrikes are passerine birds known for their habit of catching other birds and small animals and impaling the uneaten portions of their bodies on thorns. A typical shrike's beak is hooked, like a bird of prey.

- Brown shrike, Lanius cristatus (A)

== Reed warblers and allies ==
Order: Passeriformes Family: Acrocephalidae

The family Acrocephalidae is a group of small insectivorous passerine birds. Most are of generally undistinguished appearance, but many have distinctive songs.

- Caroline reed warbler, Acrocephalus syrinx (E)

== Grassbirds and allies ==
Order: Passeriformes Family: Locustellidae

Locustellidae are a family of small insectivorous songbirds found mainly in Eurasia, Africa, and the Australian region. They are smallish birds with tails that are usually long and pointed, and tend to be drab brownish or buffy all over.

- Lanceolated warbler, Locustella lanceolata (A)

== Swallows ==
Order: Passeriformes Family: Hirundinidae

The family Hirundinidae is adapted to aerial feeding. They have a slender streamlined body, long pointed wings and a short bill with a wide gape. The feet are adapted to perching rather than walking, and the front toes are partially joined at the base.

- Barn swallow, Hirundo rustica
- Tree martin, Petrochelidon nigricans (A)
- Asian house-martin, Delichon dasypus

== White-eyes, yuhinas, and allies ==
Order: Passeriformes Family: Zosteropidae

The white-eyes are small and mostly undistinguished, their plumage above being generally some dull color like greenish-olive, but some species have a white or bright yellow throat, breast or lower parts, and several have buff flanks. As their name suggests, many species have a white ring around each eye.

- Teardrop white-eye, Rukia ruki (E)
- Long-billed white-eye, Rukia longirostra (E)
- Caroline Islands white-eye, Zosterops semperi
- Plain white-eye, Zosterops hypolais (E)
- Pohnpei white-eye, Zosterops ponapensis (E)
- Kosrae white-eye, Zosterops cinereus (E)
- Yap white-eye, Zosterops oleagineus (E)

== Starlings ==
Order: Passeriformes Family: Sturnidae

Starlings are small to medium-sized passerine birds. Their flight is strong and direct and they are very gregarious. Their preferred habitat is fairly open country. They eat insects and fruit. Plumage is typically dark with a metallic sheen.

- Pohnpei starling, Aplonis pelzelni (E)
- Micronesian starling, Aplonis opaca
- Kosrae starling, Aplonis corvina (E) (Ex)
- Chestnut-cheeked starling, Agropsar philippensis (A)
- White-cheeked starling, Spodiopsar cineraceus (A)

== Thrushes and allies ==
Order: Passeriformes Family: Turdidae

The thrushes are a group of passerine birds that occur mainly in the Old World. They are plump, soft plumaged, small to medium-sized insectivores or sometimes omnivores, often feeding on the ground. Many have attractive songs.

- Eyebrowed thrush, Turdus obscurus (A)
- Dusky thrush, Turdus naumanni (A)

== Old World flycatchers ==
Order: Passeriformes Family: Muscicapidae

Old World flycatchers are a large group of small passerine birds native to the Old World. They are mainly small arboreal insectivores. The appearance of these birds is highly varied, but they mostly have weak songs and harsh calls.

- Gray-streaked flycatcher, Muscicapa griseisticta (A)
- Siberian rubythroat, Calliope calliope (A)
- Narcissus flycatcher, Ficedula narcissina (A)
- Blue rock-thrush, Monticola solitarius (A)

== Waxbills and allies ==
Order: Passeriformes Family: Estrildidae

The estrildid finches are small passerine birds of the Old World tropics and Australasia. They are gregarious and often colonial seed eaters with short thick but pointed bills. They are all similar in structure and habits, but have wide variation in plumage colors and patterns.

- Blue-faced parrotfinch, Erythrura trichroa
- Scaly-breasted munia, Lonchura punctulata (I)
- Chestnut munia, Lonchura atricapilla (I)
- Mottled munia, Lonchura hunsteini (I)

== Old World sparrows ==
Order: Passeriformes Family: Passeridae

Old World sparrows are small passerine birds. In general, sparrows tend to be small, plump, brown or gray birds with short tails and short powerful beaks. Sparrows are seed eaters, but they also consume small insects.

- Eurasian tree sparrow, Passer montanus (I)

== Wagtails and pipits ==
Order: Passeriformes Family: Motacillidae

Motacillidae is a family of small passerine birds with medium to long tails. They include the wagtails, longclaws and pipits. They are slender, ground feeding insectivores of open country.

- Gray wagtail, Motacilla cinerea
- Western yellow wagtail, Motacilla flava
- Eastern yellow wagtail, Motacilla tschutschensis (A)
- Red-throated pipit, Anthus cervinus (A)

== Old World buntings ==
Order: Passeriformes Family: Emberizidae

The emberizids are a large family of passerine birds. They are seed-eating birds with distinctively shaped bills. Many emberizid species have distinctive head patterns.

- Black-headed bunting, Emberiza melanocephala (A)

== See also ==
- List of birds
- Lists of birds by region
