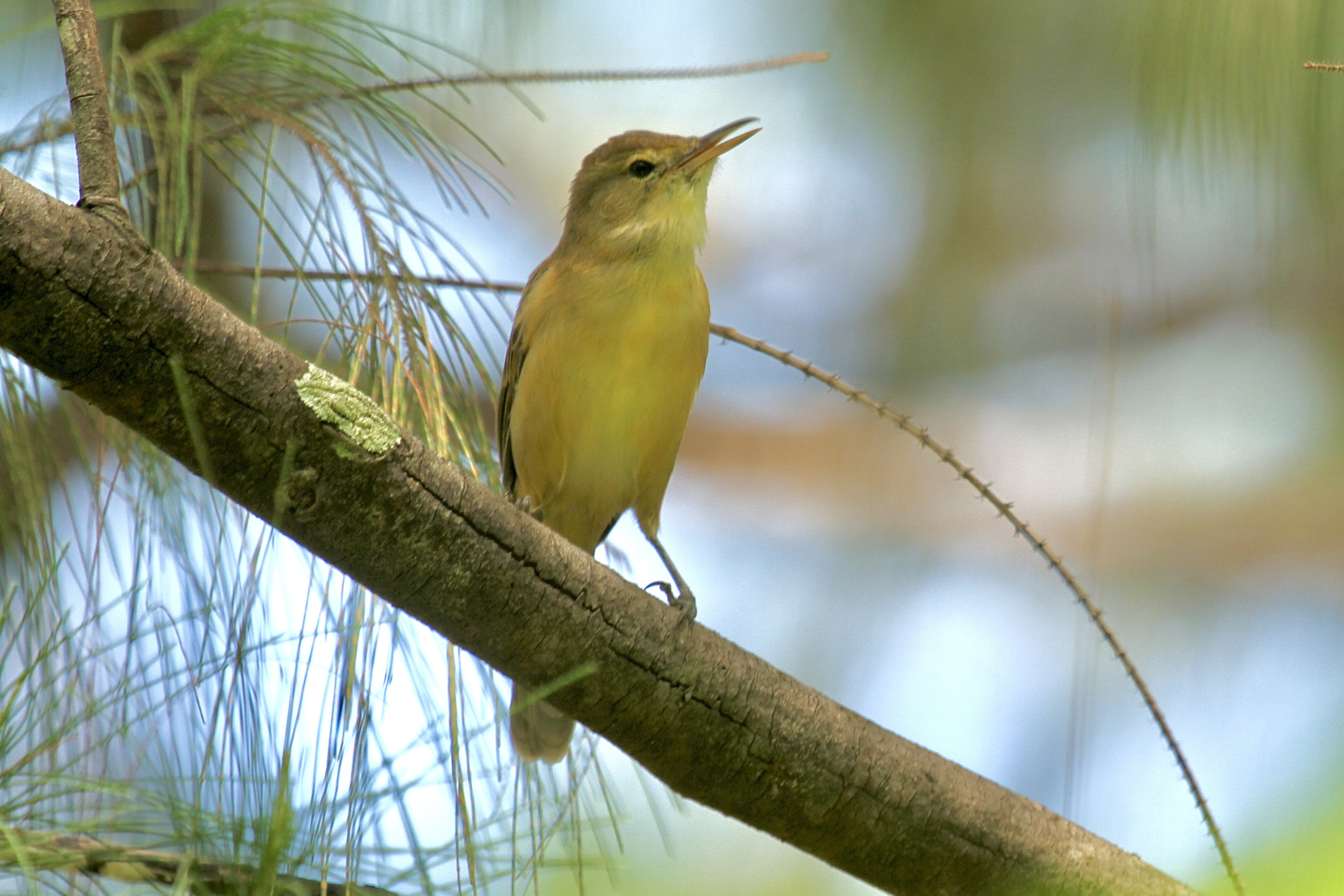

Conservation status
- Near Threatened (IUCN 3.1)

Scientific classification
- Kingdom: Animalia
- Phylum: Chordata
- Class: Aves
- Order: Passeriformes
- Family: Acrocephalidae
- Genus: Acrocephalus
- Species: A. rehsei

Binomial name
- Acrocephalus rehsei (Finsch, 1883)
- Location of Nauru

Synonyms
- Calamoherpe rehsei; Acrocephalus luscinius rehsei; Acrocephalus luscinia rehsi

= Nauru reed warbler =

Passerine bird endemic to the Pacific island of Nauru

The Nauru reed warbler (Nauruan: itsirir) (Acrocephalus rehsei) is a passerine bird endemic to the island of Nauru in the Pacific Ocean. It is one of only two native breeding land-birds on Nauru and it is the only passerine found on the island. It is related to other Micronesian reed warblers, all of which evolved from one of several radiations of the genus across the Pacific. Related warblers on nearby islands include the Caroline reed warbler, with which the Nauru species was initially confused, and the nightingale reed warbler, which was formerly sometimes considered the same species.

A medium-sized warbler, the Nauru reed warbler has dark brown upperparts, cream underparts and a long, thin beak. It makes a low, cup-shaped nest into which it lays two or three white eggs, and it feeds on insects. However, details about its behavior and ecology are little known. It is found throughout Nauru, which has changed substantially in recent decades due to phosphate mining. The Nauru reed warbler is potentially threatened by introduced predators and habitat loss, and its small range means that it could be vulnerable to chance occurrences, such as tropical cyclones. Reports of a similar warbler from nearby islands suggest that it might previously have been found elsewhere, but was driven to local extinction by introduced cats.

== Taxonomy and systematics ==
Otto Finsch was the first naturalist to visit the island of Nauru, stopping for six hours on 24 July 1880 while travelling from the Marshall Islands to the Solomon Islands. His 1881 report included a warbler he initially identified as the Caroline reed warbler. By 1883 he considered it to be a new species, Calamoherpe rehsei. The generic name Calamoherpe is now recognised as a synonym of Acrocephalus, leading to the current binomial name. The generic name Acrocephalus derives from the Greek akros, meaning "topmost", and kephale, meaning "head". The akros part of the name may have been given through confusion with acutus, and taken to mean "sharp-pointed", referring to the angular head shape typical of this genus. The synonym Calamoherpe is from the Greek kalamos, meaning "reed", and herpes, meaning "creeping thing". Finsch named the species after Ernst Rehse, a German ornithologist and collector and one of Finsch's travelling companions. Since the original descriptions, little has been written about the species, and details about its ecology and behaviour are poorly known.

Though the Nauru reed warbler is generally accepted as a species, some authorities, such as H. E. Wolters in Die Vogelarte der Erde (1980) and Howard and Moore in A Complete Checklist of the Birds of the World (1991), have considered it a subspecies of Acrocephalus luscinius, the nightingale reed warbler. A 2011 DNA study has affirmed its status as a separate species. It is considered monotypic, meaning there are no recognised subspecies. The species is known by the English common names Finsch's reed-warbler, Nauru warbler, pleasant warbler, the Nauru reed-warbler, and the Nauru reed warbler. In the native Nauruan language, it is known as Itsirir.

A 2009 phylogenic study of the family Acrocephalidae did not include this species, and as recently as 2010 its relation with other members of the genus was unknown. A 2011 analysis of mitochondrial DNA showed that the Nauru reed warbler forms a clade with the Australian reed warbler, the bokikokiko, the southern Marquesan reed warbler and a now-extinct species from Pagan Island in the Marianas. The closest relative of the Nauru reed warbler appears to be the extinct warbler from Pagan. This is currently named as a subspecies of the nightingale reed warbler, A. luscinius yamashinae, but that species is polyphyletic, and the Pagan form, which has been proposed as a new species, the Pagan reed warbler, is in a different clade to nightingale reed warblers from other islands.

The pattern of colonisation of the Pacific islands and eventually Australia by the Acrocephalus warblers from Asia was complex, with multiple colonisations of even remote archipelagos. Although the Hawaiian islands were colonised about 2.3 million years ago, the other islands were reached much more recently, in the mid-Pleistocene (between 0.2–1.4 million years ago) or even later. The nearest other warblers geographically to Nauru are the Carolinian reed warbler and the nightingale reed warbler.

== Description ==
The Nauru reed warbler is a medium-sized and warmly coloured reed warbler, with a relatively light build. The entirety of the upperparts are dark brown, with the rump and uppertail coverts slightly brighter than the tail and mantle. When closed, the wing is the same colour as the mantle, short and rounded. The wing does not reach the start of the tail feathers, which enhances the appearance of a long tail. Close inspection of the wing reveals darker centres to both the greater coverts and tertial feathers. Its face shows little contrast, as the ear coverts, crown, nape, chin and throat are all a similar shade of pale brown. The lores are a dark brown, and there is a pale, creamy supercilium, or "eyebrow", extending from the beak to the ear coverts, which are a cinnamon-brown, darkening and merging with the nape. The beak is long, thin and straight.

The underparts are much lighter, darkening towards the vent and undertail coverts. The chin is a dull cream, merging with the throat, which then browns towards the base. The centre of the breast is a dull brown-yellow, while the sides are a reddish brown. The upper mandible of the beak is dark grey with pink edges, while the lower mandible is pink, darkening towards to the tip. The legs and feet are dark grey. The bird measures up to 15 centimetres (5.9 in), with a wingspan of 6.7 to 7.2 centimetres (2.6 to 2.8 in).

The species exhibits no sexual dimorphism, and characteristics of the young are unknown. As the only passerine on the island, there is no chance that this species may be confused with any other. The Nauru reed warbler is slightly smaller than the Caroline reed warbler, which is also lighter in colour, with a more contrasting eyebrow. The nightingale reed warbler is substantially larger, and the Oriental reed warbler has a duller colouration, with whiter underparts.

== Distribution and habitat ==
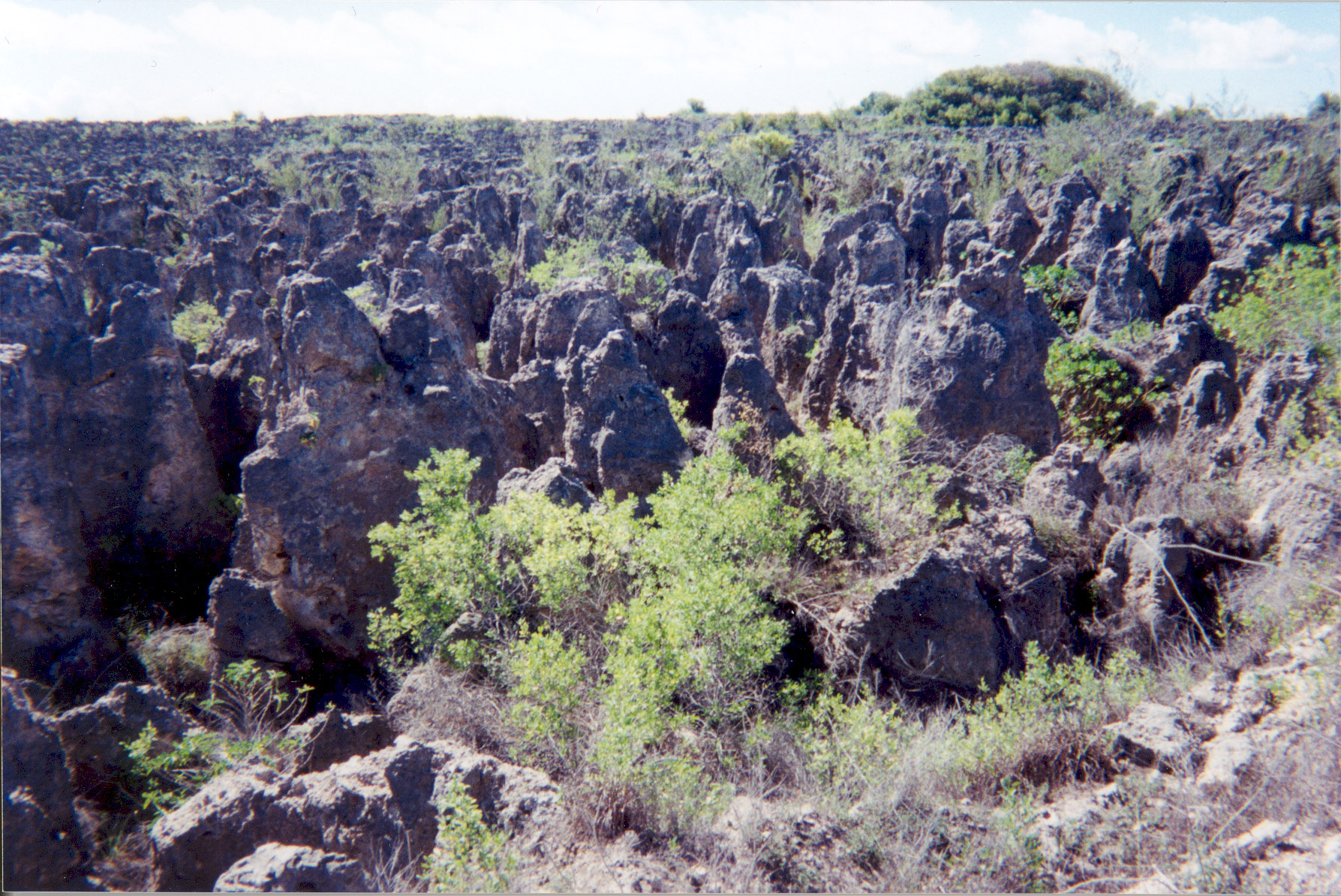
Scrubland remaining after phosphate mining, an environment in which the Nauru reed warbler thrives

The Nauru reed warbler is endemic to the island of Nauru, in the Pacific Ocean. It is one of only two indigenous land birds which breed on the island, the other being the Micronesian pigeon. The warbler can be found throughout the island, thriving in the scrubland in areas previously used for phosphate mining, as well as the remaining patches of forest on the island's central plateau. It is most common in the remains of forest found on the island's steep slopes. It is also readily observed in gardens and ruderal areas on the island's coast. In 1881, Finsch described the species as abundant, calling it "as common as the House-Sparrow in England." Biologist Donald Buden again found it widespread on the island in 2008.

The species is sedentary, meaning that the birds do not naturally leave Nauru. Banaba is the nearest island, and despite being similar to Nauru, it lacks any warblers. However, it is possible that populations of the Nauru reed warbler existed on other islands until comparatively recently. On the Marshall Islands, traditional stories refer to a small bird, known in Marshallese as annañ, anang or annãng. This bird was considered the property of chieftains. Though no physical descriptions exist of the species, it has been described as butterfly-sized, pleasant-smelling and as living among rocks on the shores of north-western islands. Ethnographers Krämer and Nevermann reported that the bird became extinct or extirpated around 1880. Based on descriptions of birds seen on Jaluit, Paul Schnee hypothesised that the annañ may have been a Nauru reed warbler. The extinction of the annañ may have been due to hunting by cats, which were introduced to the Marshall Islands by the Russian Otto von Kotzebue in 1817 to hunt rats. They then multiplied before being spread by locals as pets, after which they started to become feral.

== Behaviour and ecology ==
External audio
- Nauru reed warbler call, recorded by Donald Buden, 22 Dec 2006. Macaulay Library, Cornell Lab of Ornithology, Cornell University.

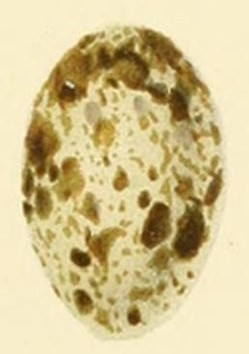
Illustration of the egg of Acrocephalus rehsei

Nauru reed warbler nests are cup-shaped and woven from grasses and twigs. They sometimes include Cassytha filiformis vine or Casuarina equisetifolia needles. The nests are bound to upright stems in a way typical of warblers. Buden reported that the warblers nest in trees and shrubs at a height of 2 to 8 m (6.6 to 26.2 ft). The species may also nest on the ground; the young in ground nests may be more vulnerable to predation by rats. Eggs have variously been reported in December and July, and ornithologist A. Pearson suggested that the species may nest all year round. The clutch size has been reported as two or three eggs. Incubation and fledgling periods are unknown. Pearson reported lower nesting than Buden, recording nests in bushes and undergrowth between 45 and 300 cm (18 and 118 in) from the ground, especially in forked branches of hibiscus and lime. Buden reported that the birds were more vocal in December than in March and April. The song has been described as similar to that of a song thrush, common blackbird, or willie wagtail, and it is delivered both day and night.

Finsch described the warbler as insectivorous, feeding primarily on dragonflies. Six species of dragonfly have been observed on the island: Ischnura aurora, Anax guttatus, Diplacodes bipunctata, Pantala flavescens, Tholymis tillarga and Tramea transmarina. Buden did not observe the species feeding on dragonflies, but did see three different feeding habits. Most frequently, the birds were seen moving through trees and shrubs, catching prey on the foliage. Other birds were seen perched close to the floor, darting to the ground, and returning to the perch with prey. In open areas, the birds were observed moving across the ground, "occasionally grasping a presumed prey item". In coastal areas, they have been observed feeding in coconut trees. Potential predators for the birdlife of Nauru in general include feral cats and dogs, as well as the Polynesian rat and the tanezumi rat. Feral cats and wild rats in particular are potential threats to the Nauru reed warbler.

== Status ==
The IUCN lists the species as "Near Threatened", because the "species has a very restricted range where habitat degradation is ongoing." BirdLife International previously estimated that there were between 10,000 and 20,000 Nauru reed warblers, based on 1993 data, but Buden's 2006 estimate of 5,000 birds of all ages led to a revised figure of 3,000 mature individuals, a figure reaffirmed in 2016 and again in 2023. In 2001, it was observed that the removal of the phosphate deposits on the island meant that the vegetation was decreasing, presenting a potential threat to the species. In 2008, however, Buden claimed that "habitat degradation and loss of native forest via mining operations has apparently had no major adverse effects on the population." Nauru reed warblers were observed to be common on the island, and flourishing in the scrubland left by mining.

Unlike other birds on the island, the species is not hunted, and is protected under Schedule 1 of Nauru's Wild Birds Preservation Ordinance 1937. For conservation purposes, the IUCN recommends regular surveys of the population and the establishment of a monitoring programme through training local people. It also proposed raising conservation awareness by increasing the profile of the bird.

== See also ==
- List of birds of Nauru

== Notes ==
=== Cited texts ===
- Buden, Donald W. (2008a). "The birds of Nauru" (PDF). Notornis. 55 (1): 8–19. Archived from the original (PDF) on 2017-01-06.
- Finsch, Otto (1883). "XIV.—On a new Reed-Warbler from the Island of Nawodo, or Pleasant Island, in the Western Pacific". Ibis. 25 (2): 142–144. doi:10.1111/j.1474-919X.1883.tb05490.x.
- Hildyard, Anne, ed. (2001). Endangered Wildlife and Plants of the World. Vol. 12: Umb-zor. Marshall Cavendish. ISBN 978-0-7614-7206-3.
- Jobling, James A. (2010). The Helm Dictionary of Scientific Bird Names (PDF). Christopher Helm. ISBN 978-1-4081-2501-4.
- Spennemann, Dirk H. R. (2006). "Extinctions and extirpations in Marshall Islands avifauna since European contact; a review of historic evidence" (PDF). Micronesica. 38 (2): 253–266. Archived from the original (PDF) on 23 March 2016.
