= Yap white-eye =

Yap white-eye can refer to either of the two species of white-eye found on Yap.

- Yap olive white-eye (Zosterops oleagineus)
- Plain white-eye (Zosterops hypolais)
