= List of birds of Nauru =

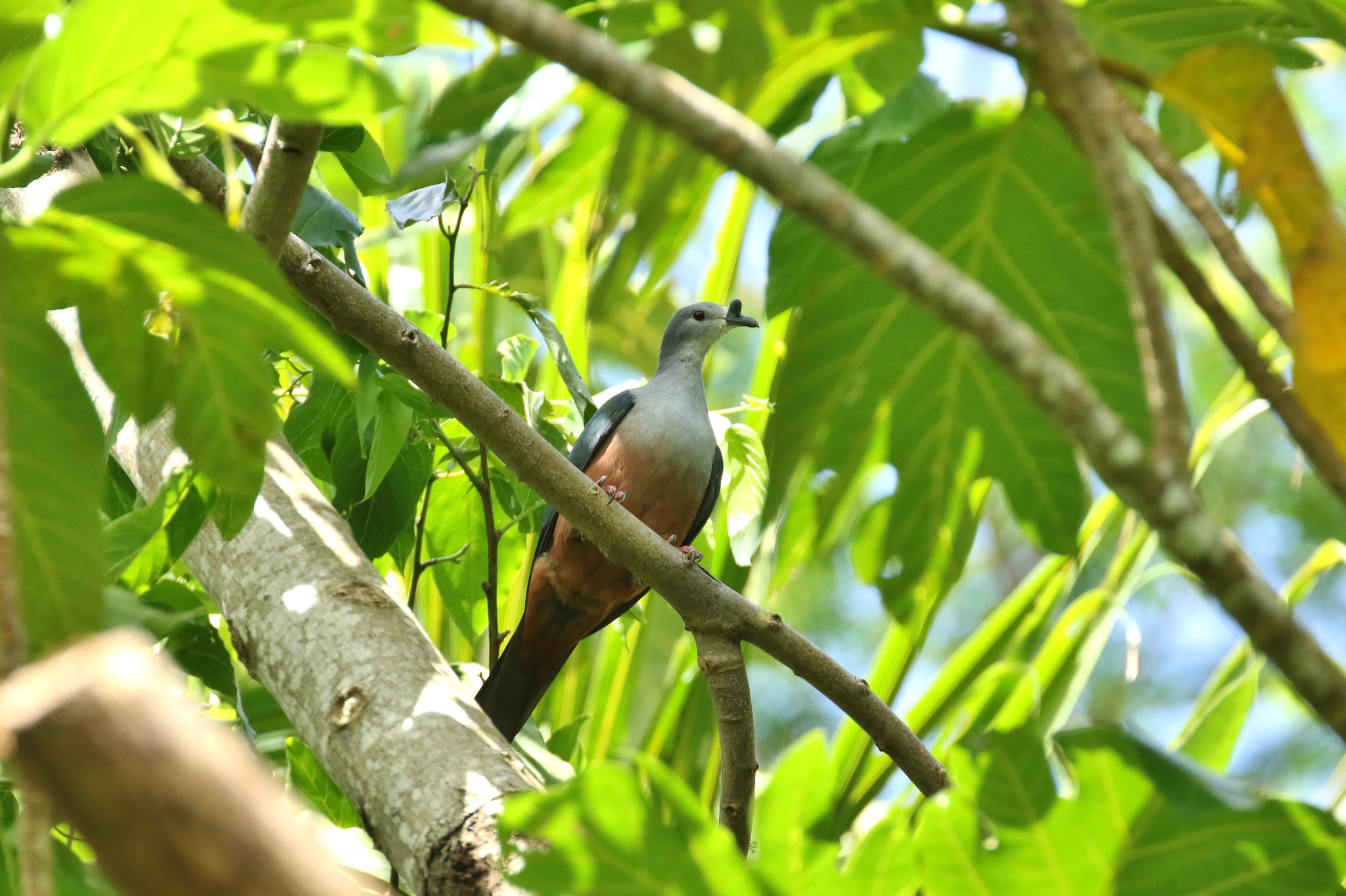
A Micronesian imperial-pigeon, one of just two land birds breeding on Nauru

There are 34 species of birds that have been recorded living in the wild in Nauru, one of which is endemic to the island and two of which have been introduced by humans. One species, the zebra finch, is now locally extinct on Nauru. Out of the 25 species of birds that have been confirmed to occur natively on Nauru, 18 are non-breeding visitors. Only two land birds, the Micronesian imperial-pigeon and the endemic Nauru reed warbler, breed on Nauru. Three species occurring on Nauru are listed as being near-threatened on the IUCN Red List and two are listed as being vulnerable.

Nauru is a small atoll in the Pacific Ocean with an equatorial climate. The island's environment has been described as one of the world's most modified due to surface mining for phosphate, bombing during World War II, and rapid urbanisation. It was covered with tropical rainforest before the 19th century, but its current vegetation consists of strand, shrubland, scattered coconut trees, and various ornamental and fruit trees. Habitat destruction has most likely caused a decline in the numbers of some species, such as the Micronesian imperial-pigeon and the black noddy.

This list's taxonomic treatment (designation and sequence of orders, families and species) and nomenclature (common and scientific names) follow the conventions of the 2022 edition of The Clements Checklist of Birds of the World. The family accounts at the beginning of each heading reflect this taxonomy, as do the species counts found in each family account.

The following codes have been used to denote categories. Species without these tags are commonly occurring native species.

- (A) Accidental – A species that rarely or accidentally occurs in Nauru.
- (E) Endemic – A species endemic to Nauru.
- (I) Introduced – A species introduced to Nauru as a direct or indirect consequence of human actions.
- (Ex) Extirpated – A species that no longer occurs in Nauru although populations exist elsewhere.

== Pheasants, grouse, and allies ==
Order: Galliformes Family: Phasianidae

The Phasianidae are a family of terrestrial birds comprising the quails, partridges, snowcocks, francolins, spurfowls, tragopans, monals, pheasants, peafowls, grouse, ptarmigan, and junglefowls. In general, they are plump (although they vary in size) and have broad, relatively short wings.

- Red junglefowl, Gallus gallus (I)

== Pigeons and doves ==
Order: Columbiformes Family: Columbidae

Pigeons and doves are stout-bodied birds with short necks and short slender bills with a fleshy cere.

- Rock pigeon, Columba livia (I)
- Micronesian imperial-pigeon, Ducula oceanica

== Cuckoos ==
Order: Cuculiformes Family: Cuculidae

The family Cuculidae includes cuckoos, roadrunners and anis. These birds are of variable size with slender bodies, long tails and strong legs. Many species are brood parasites.

- Long-tailed koel, Eudynamys taitensis

== Plovers and lapwings ==
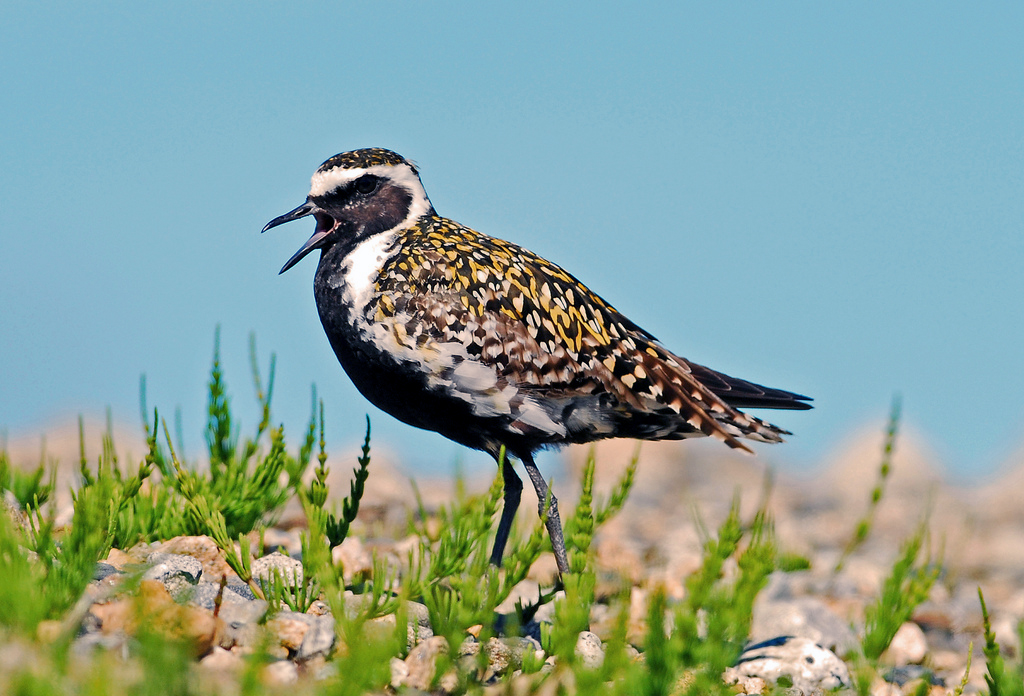
Pacific golden-plover

Order: Charadriiformes Family: Charadriidae

The family Charadriidae includes the plovers, dotterels and lapwings. They are small to medium-sized birds with compact bodies, short, thick necks and long, usually pointed, wings. They are found in open country worldwide, mostly in habitats near water.

- Black-bellied plover, Pluvialis squatarola (A)
- Pacific golden-plover, Pluvialis fulva
- Lesser sand-plover, Charadrius mongolus (A)
- Greater sand-plover, Charadrius leschenaultii (A)

== Sandpipers and allies ==
Order: Charadriiformes Family: Scolopacidae

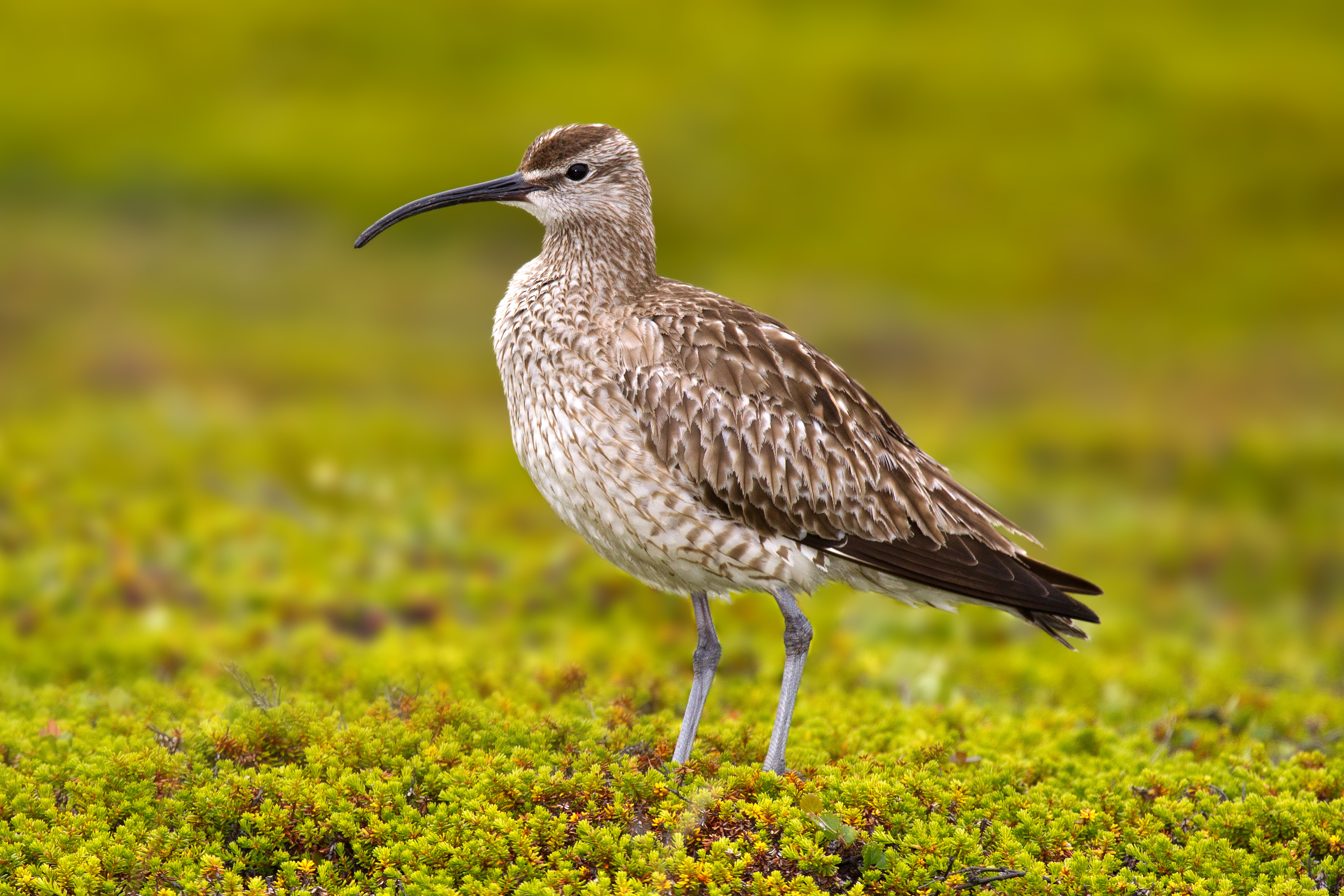
Whimbrel

Scolopacidae is a large, diverse family of small to medium-sized shorebirds that includes the sandpipers, curlews, godwits, shanks, tattlers, woodcocks, snipes, dowitchers and phalaropes. The majority of these species eat small invertebrates picked out of the mud or soil. Variation in length of legs and bills enables multiple species to feed in the same habitat, particularly on the coast, without direct competition for food.

- Bristle-thighed curlew, Numenius tahitiensis (A)
- Whimbrel, Numenius phaeopus
- Bar-tailed godwit, Limosa lapponica (A)
- Ruddy turnstone, Arenaria interpres
- Sharp-tailed sandpiper, Calidris acuminata (A)
- Gray-tailed tattler, Tringa brevipes (A)
- Wandering tattler, Tringa incana (A)

== Gulls, terns, and skimmers ==
Order: Charadriiformes Family: Laridae

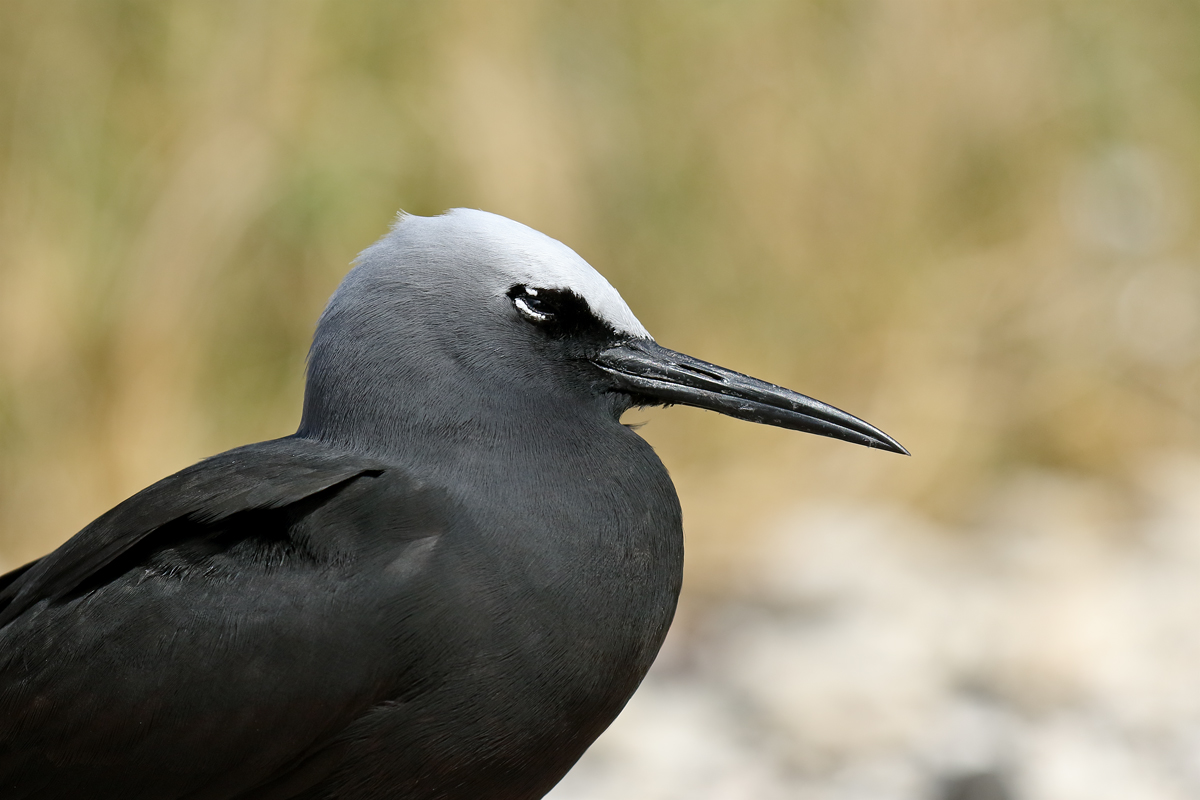
Black noddy

Laridae is a family of seabirds consisting of gulls, terns, and skimmers. Gulls are typically grey or white, often with black markings on the head or wings. Terns are generally smaller than gulls with more pointed wings and bills, many also having forked tails which help with aerial manoeuvrability. Both species can be found inland near lakes and rivers, however gulls have adapted well to human presence and can often be found in urban centers. Black noddies are extensively hunted as food in Nauru.

- Brown noddy, Anous stolidus
- Black noddy, Anous minutus
- White tern, Gygis alba
- Sooty tern, Onychoprion fuscatus (A)
- Black-naped tern, Sterna sumatrana (A)
- Great crested tern, Thalasseus bergii (A)

== Tropicbirds ==
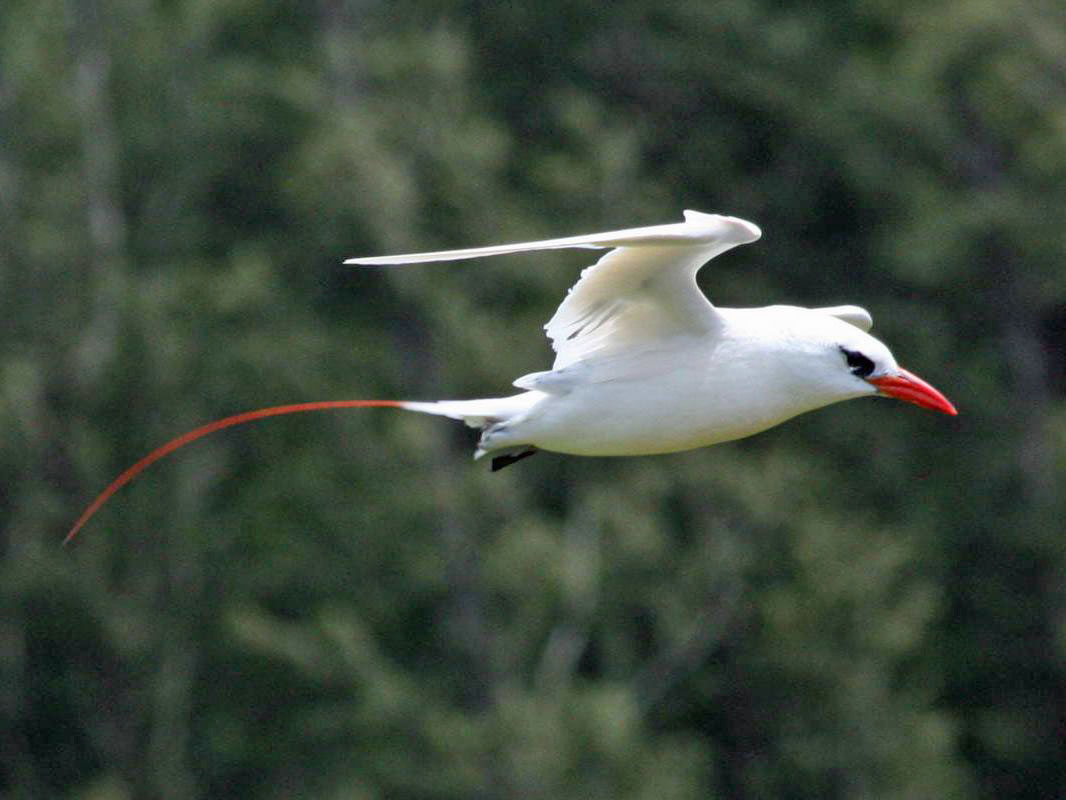
Red-tailed tropicbird

Order: Pelecaniformes Family: Phaethontidae

Tropicbirds are slender white birds of tropical oceans, with exceptionally long central tail feathers. Their heads and long wings have black markings.

- White-tailed tropicbird, Phaethon lepturus
- Red-tailed tropicbird, Phaethon rubricauda (A)

== Shearwaters and petrels ==
Order: Procellariiformes Family: Procellariidae

The procellariiforms are a group of medium-sized petrels, characterised by united nostrils with a medium nasal septum and a long outer functional primary flight feather.

- Tropical shearwater, Puffinus bailloni

== Frigatebirds ==
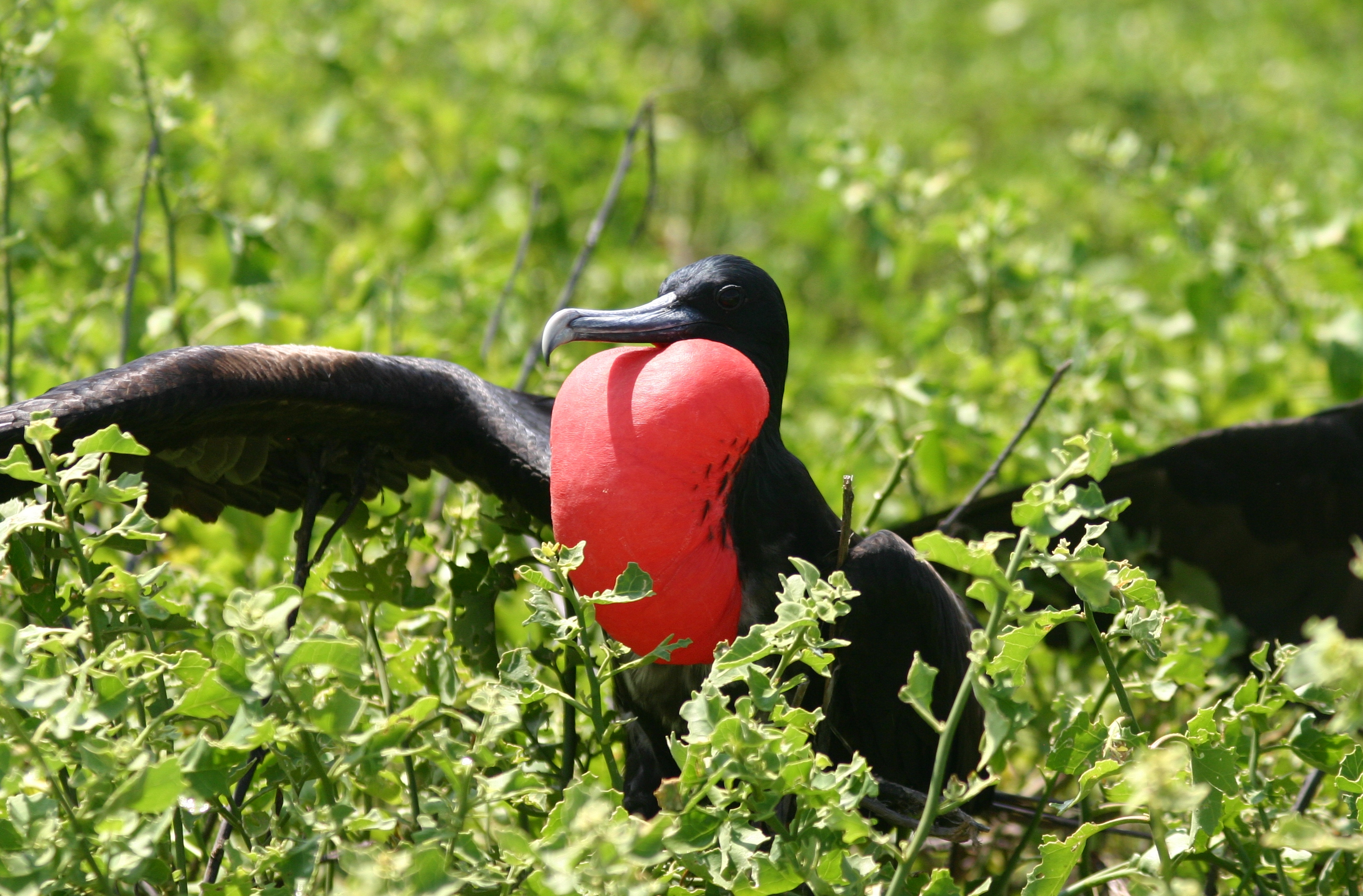
Male great frigatebird

Order: Suliformes Family: Fregatidae

Frigatebirds are large seabirds usually found over tropical oceans. They are large, black and white or completely black, with long wings and deeply forked tails. The males have coloured inflatable throat pouches. They do not swim or walk and cannot take off from a flat surface. Having the largest wingspan to body weight ratio of any bird, they are essentially aerial, able to stay aloft for more than a week.

- Lesser frigatebird, Fregata ariel
- Great frigatebird, Fregata minor

== Boobies and gannets ==
Order: Suliformes Family: Sulidae

The sulids comprise the gannets and boobies. Both groups are medium to large coastal seabirds that plunge-dive for fish.

- Brown booby, Sula leucogaster
- Red-footed booby, Sula sula (A)

== Pelicans ==
Order: Pelecaniformes Family: Pelecanidae

Pelicans are large water birds with a distinctive pouch under their beak. As with other members of the order Pelecaniformes, they have webbed feet with four toes.

- Australian pelican, Pelecanus conspicillatus (A)

== Herons, egrets, and bitterns ==
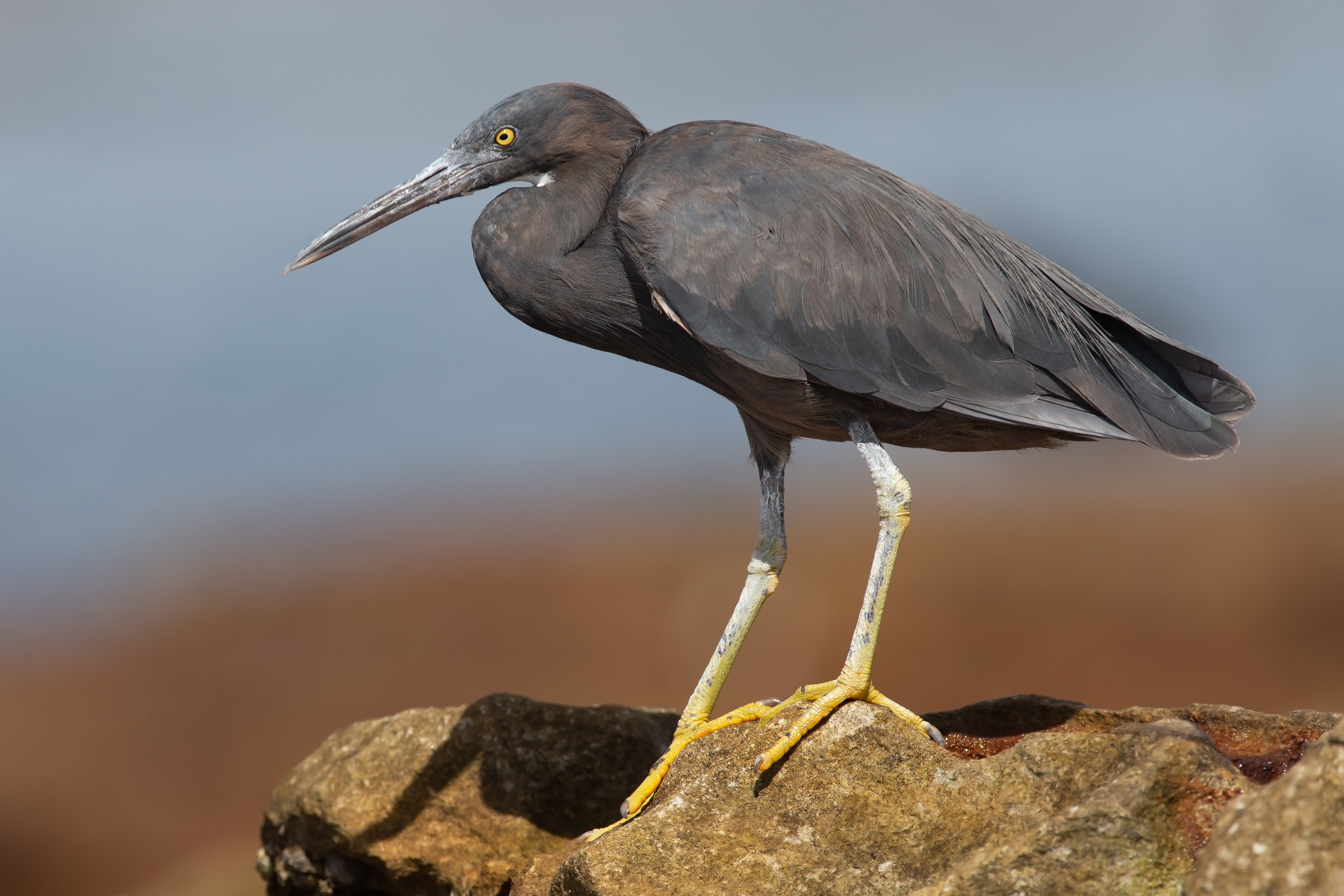
A dark morph of the Pacific reef-heron

Order: Pelecaniformes Family: Ardeidae

The family Ardeidae contains the bitterns, herons, and egrets. Herons and egrets are medium to large wading birds with long necks and legs. Bitterns tend to be shorter necked and more wary. Members of Ardeidae fly with their necks retracted, unlike other long-necked birds such as storks, ibises and spoonbills.

- Pacific reef-heron, Egretta sacra

== Kingfishers ==
Order: Coraciiformes Family: Alcedinidae

Kingfishers are medium-sized birds with large heads, long pointed bills, short legs and stubby tails.

- Sacred kingfisher, Todirhamphus sanctus (A)
- Collared kingfisher, Todirhamphus chloris (A)

== Reed warblers and allies ==
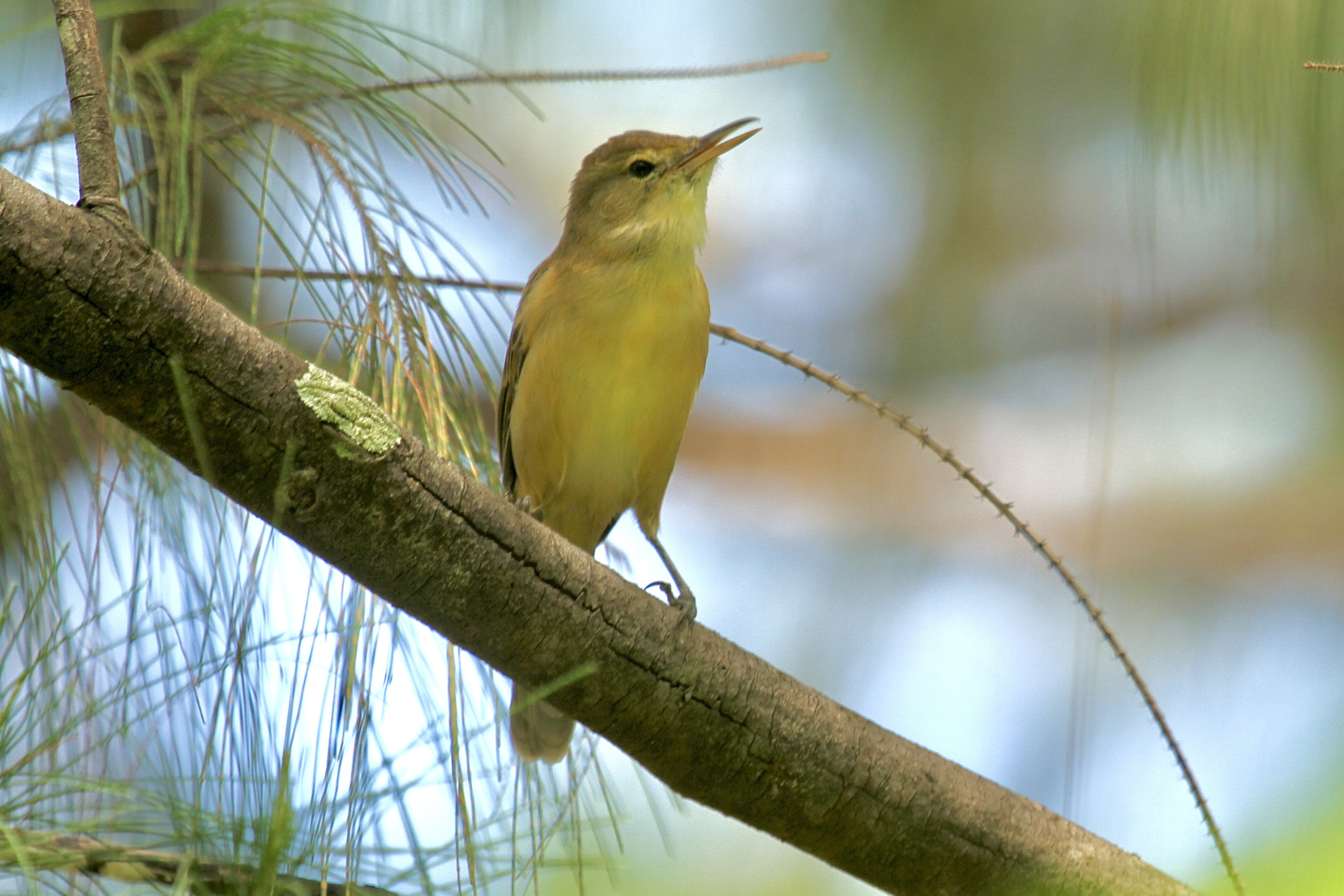
Nauru reed warbler, the only non-introduced passerine on the island

Order: Passeriformes Family: Acrocephalidae

The family Acrocephalidae is a group of small insectivorous passerine birds. Most have a generally undistinguished appearance, but many have distinctive songs. They are usually found in open woodland, reedbeds, or tall grass.

- Nauru reed warbler, Acrocephalus rehsei (E)

== Waxbills and allies ==
Order: Passeriformes Family: Estrildidae

The estrildid finches are small passerine birds of the Old World tropics and Australasia. They are gregarious and often colonial seed eaters with short thick but pointed bills. They are all similar in structure and habits, but have wide variation in plumage colours and patterns.

- Zebra finch, Taeniopygia guttata (Ex)

== See also ==
- List of birds
- Lists of birds by region
