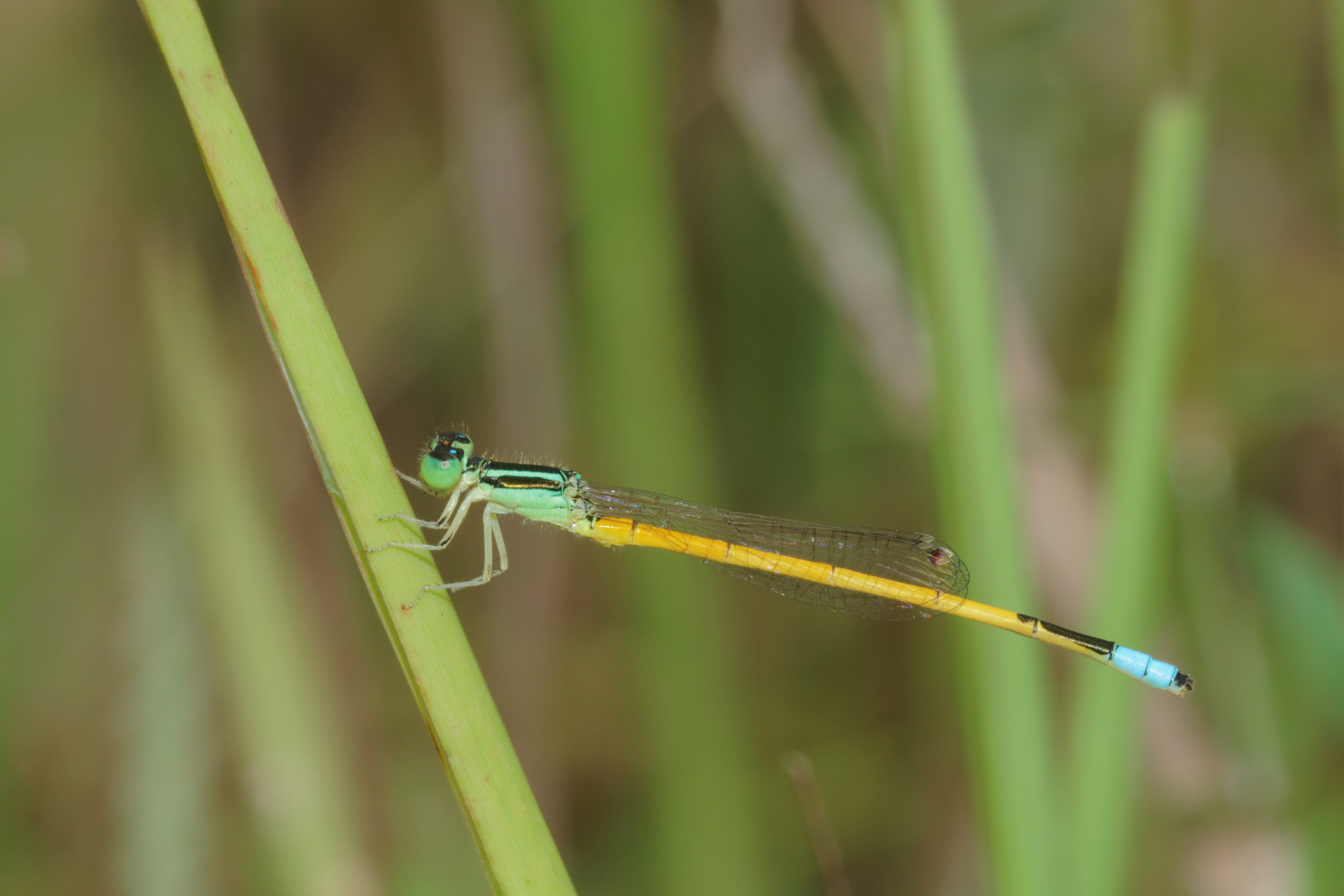
- male
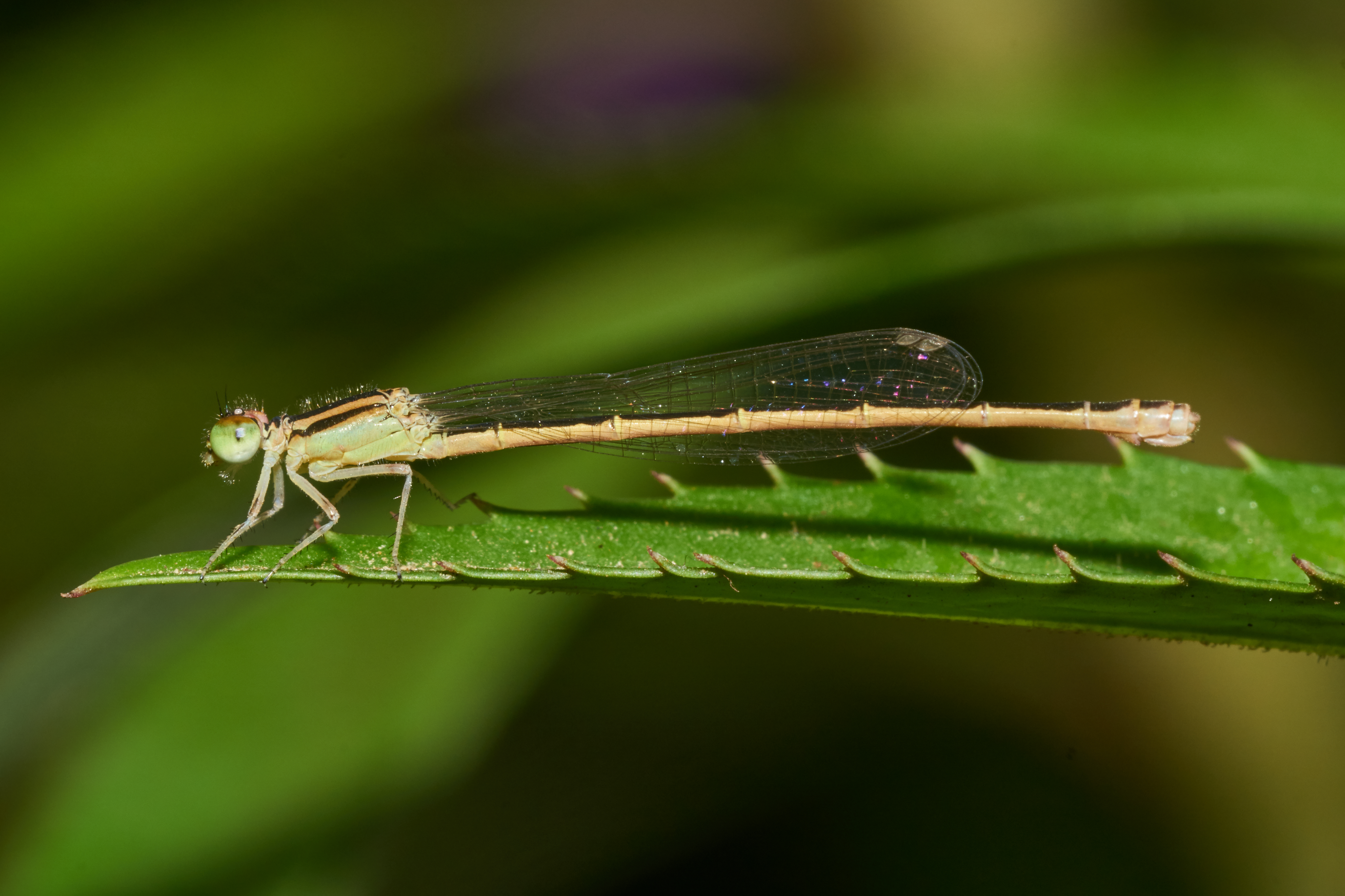
- female

Scientific classification
- Kingdom: Animalia
- Phylum: Arthropoda
- Clade: Pancrustacea
- Class: Insecta
- Order: Odonata
- Suborder: Zygoptera
- Family: Coenagrionidae
- Genus: Ischnura
- Species: I. rubilio

Binomial name
- Ischnura rubilio Selys, 1876

Synonyms
- Ischnura aurora rubilio Selys, 1876

= Ischnura rubilio =

Western golden dartlet

Species of damselfly

Ischnura rubilio, western golden dartlet, is a species of damselfly in the family Coenagrionidae. It is found in Indian subcontinent and Iran.

Earlier it was considered as a subspecies of Ischnura aurora, distributed from Australia and Pacific Islands. There are strong differences in DNA between the Asian forms of the species and specimens from the Pacific. There is also some morphological differences; dorsal side of segment 8 and 9 are entirely blue in Asian forms compared to only 1/3 of length of segment 8 is blue in specimens from the Pacific. The form found in Indian subcontinent and Iran is Ischnura aurora rubilio Selys, 1876 and is now considered as a good species, Ischnura rubilio.

== Description and habitat ==
It is a small apple green damselfly with black thoracic stripes, black capped olive green eyes, and blue tipped yellow tail. Its thorax is bronzed black color on dorsal side with narrow olive green antehumeral stripes. The lateral sides of the thorax is also pale olive green. The wing spots are different in fore and hind-wings. It is rose-red for its proximal half and transparent for the distal. Its abdomen is rusty-yellow, except for segments 8 to 10, which are azure blue. There is a large diamond-shaped spot on apical end of the dorsum side of segment 6. Segment 7 is broadly bronzed black on the dorsum. Segments 8 to 10 entirely azure blue. There is a broad black dorsal spot in segment 10. Anal appendages are pale brown, tipped with black. Female is more robust and less conspicuously marked than the male. Its abdomen is marked with a broad black dorsal stripe extending the whole length. The sides of the abdomen is yellowish red.

It breeds in weedy ponds, lakes and marshes.

== See also ==
- List of odonata species of India
- List of odonata of Kerala
