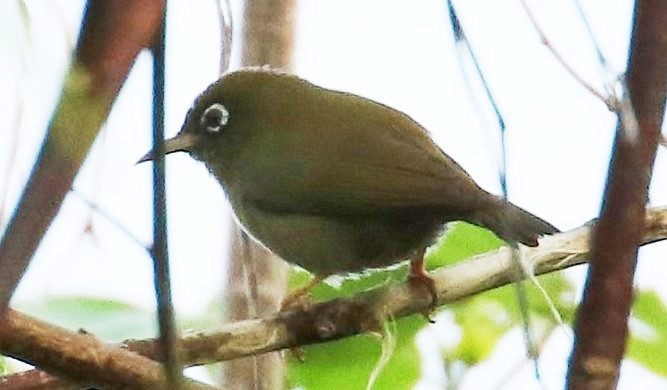
- on Yap, Micronesia

Conservation status
- Near Threatened (IUCN 3.1)

Scientific classification
- Kingdom: Animalia
- Phylum: Chordata
- Class: Aves
- Order: Passeriformes
- Family: Zosteropidae
- Genus: Zosterops
- Species: Z. oleagineus

Binomial name
- Zosterops oleagineus Hartlaub & Finsch, 1872

= Olive-colored white-eye =

Species of bird

The olive-colored white-eye (Zosterops oleagineus), also known as the olive white-eye, Yap olive white-eye or great Yap white-eye, is a species of bird in the family Zosteropidae. The indigenous name in the Yapese language is "Alingithngith", which applies to both species of Zosterops found in Yap.

== Distribution and habitat ==
It is endemic to the Micronesian island of Yap. Its natural habitats are tropical moist lowland and mangrove forests. It is threatened by habitat loss.

== Taxonomy ==
It is often placed in the genus Rukia with the teardrop and long-billed white-eyes and is most similar in plumage to the former.
