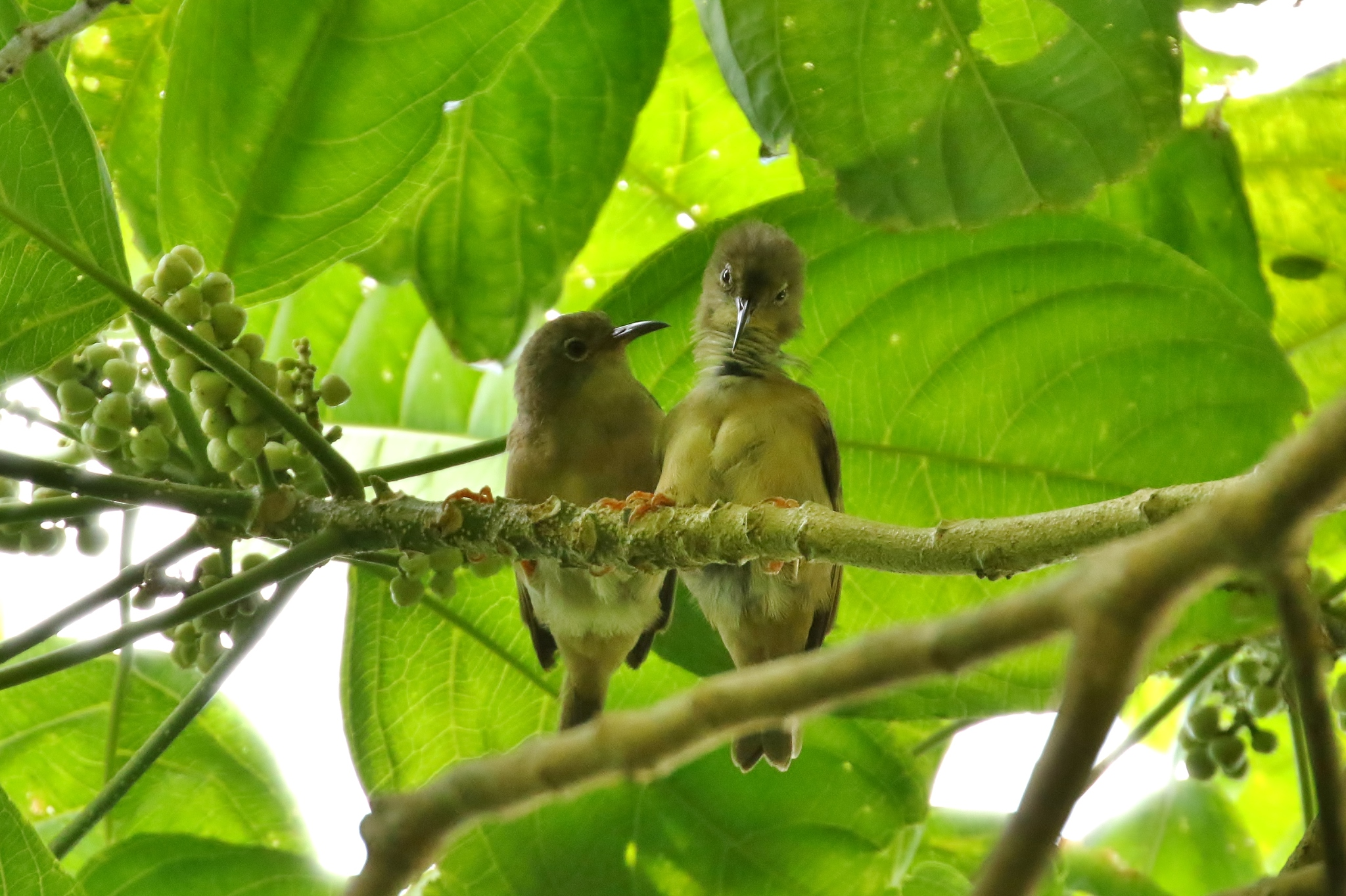
- Rukia longirostra

Scientific classification
- Kingdom: Animalia
- Phylum: Chordata
- Class: Aves
- Order: Passeriformes
- Family: Zosteropidae
- Genus: Rukia; Momiyama, 1922

Species
- Rukia longirostra; Rukia ruki

= Rukia =

Genus of birds

Rukia is a small genus of birds in the white-eye family. Its two members are found in the Federated States of Micronesia on the island of Pohnpei and the Faichuk group of the Chuuk islands.

The genus Rukia contains the following two (or three) species:

Image	Common name	Scientific name
	Long-billed white-eye	Rukia longirostra
	Teardrop white-eye or Faichuk white-eye	Rukia ruki
	Olive-colored white-eye	Sometimes included as Rukia oleaginea; other authorities place it in the genus Zosterops as Zosterops oleagineus
