= Semecarpus kraemeri =

Scientific classification
- Kingdom: Plantae
- Clade: Tracheophytes
- Clade: Angiosperms
- Clade: Eudicots
- Clade: Rosids
- Order: Sapindales
- Family: Anacardiaceae
- Genus: Semecarpus
- Species: S. kraemeri

Binomial name
- Semecarpus kraemeri Lauterb.

Species of tree

Semecarpus kraemeri, or Chuuk poisontree, is a species of plant in the family Anacardiaceae. It is endemic to the island of Chuuk within the Federated States of Micronesia. A fellow endemic, the great Truk white-eye is thought to depend on this plant for survival.
