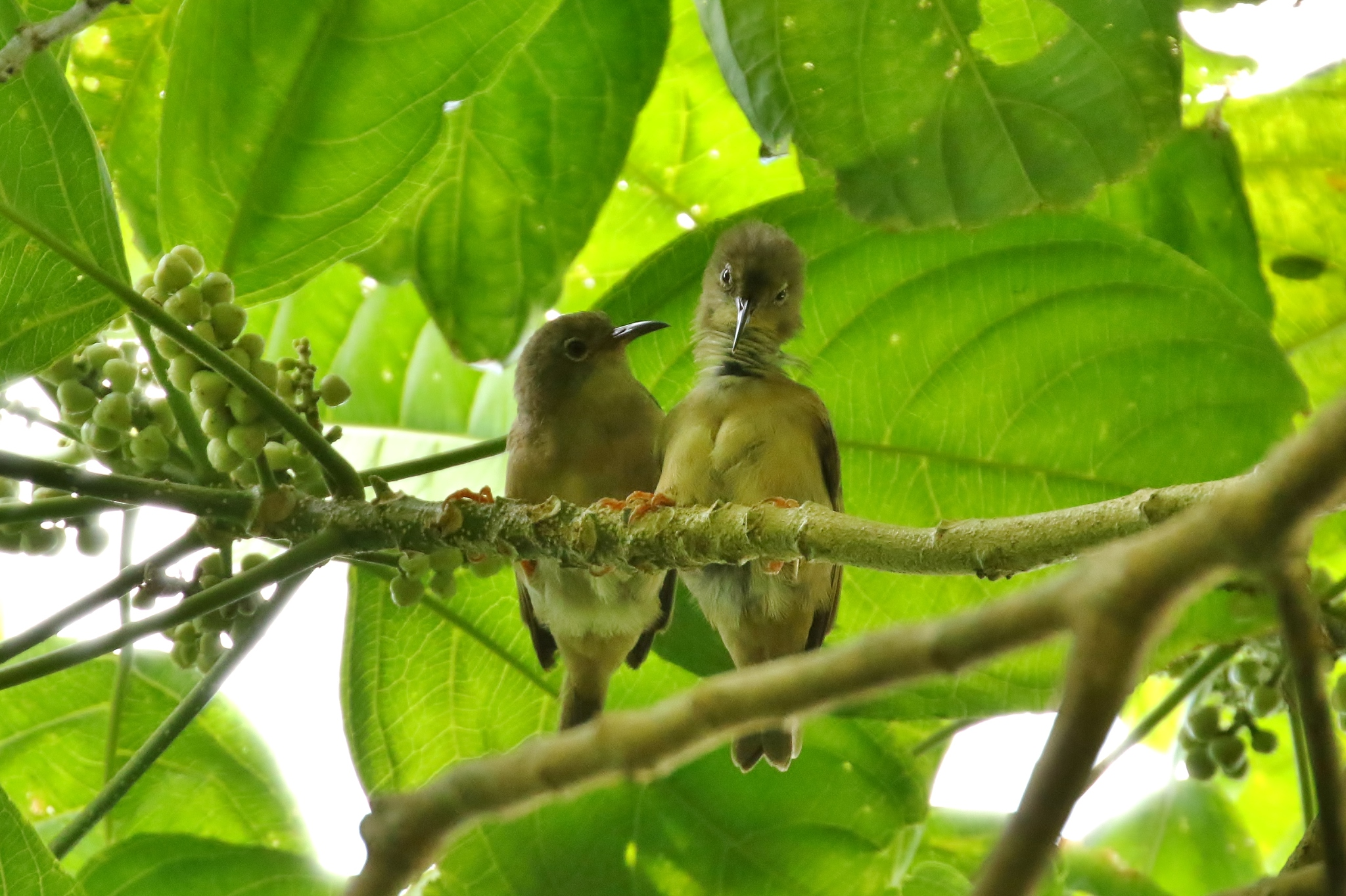

Conservation status
- Near Threatened (IUCN 3.1)

Scientific classification
- Kingdom: Animalia
- Phylum: Chordata
- Class: Aves
- Order: Passeriformes
- Family: Zosteropidae
- Genus: Rukia
- Species: R. longirostra

Binomial name
- Rukia longirostra (Taka-Tsukasa & Yamashina, 1931)

Synonyms
- Cynnirorhyncha longirostra Taka-Tsukasa & Yamashina, 1931; Rhamphozosterops sanfordi Mayr, 1931; Rukia sanfordi Mayr, 1931

= Long-billed white-eye =

Species of bird

The long-billed white-eye (Rukia longirostra), known as tiht in Pohnpeian, is a species of oscine passerine bird belonging to the family Zosteropidae, the white-eyes. It is endemic to the island of Pohnpei in the Federated States of Micronesia.

== Taxonomy ==
The long-billed white-eyes was first formally described as Cynnirorhyncha longirostra by the Japanese ornithologists Nobusuke Takatsukasa and Yoshimaro Yamashina with its type locality given as Ponape. This species is one of two white-eye species classified within the genus Rukia, a genus confined to the Federated States of Micronesia. Rukia was proposed in 1922 by the Japanese ornithologist Tokutaro Momiyama with the teardrop white-eye (Tephras ruki) as its type species. This genus has been recovered as nesting within the genus Zosterops in some studies. This species is classified in the family Zosteropidae, the white-eyes.

== Description ==
The long-billed white-eyes is an aberrant species of white-eyes. The overall colour is pale brownish-olive with orange legs and a long decurved bill. The call is a high pitched descending "tseer". This bird has a length of 13 cm (5.1 in) and weigh 17.9 g (0.63 oz).

== Distribution and habitat ==
The long-billed white-eyes is endemic to the island of Pohnpei in the Caroline Islands in the Federated States of Micronesia in the central Pacific Ocean. Its habitat is and broadleaf forest, it is rarely found in plantations.

== Biology ==
The long-billed white-eyes has a diet dominated by nectar, especially that of the native palm, it also takes insects and sometimes fruit. The association of this species with the uplands may be because of it nectar feeding habits and competition with other native passerines.
