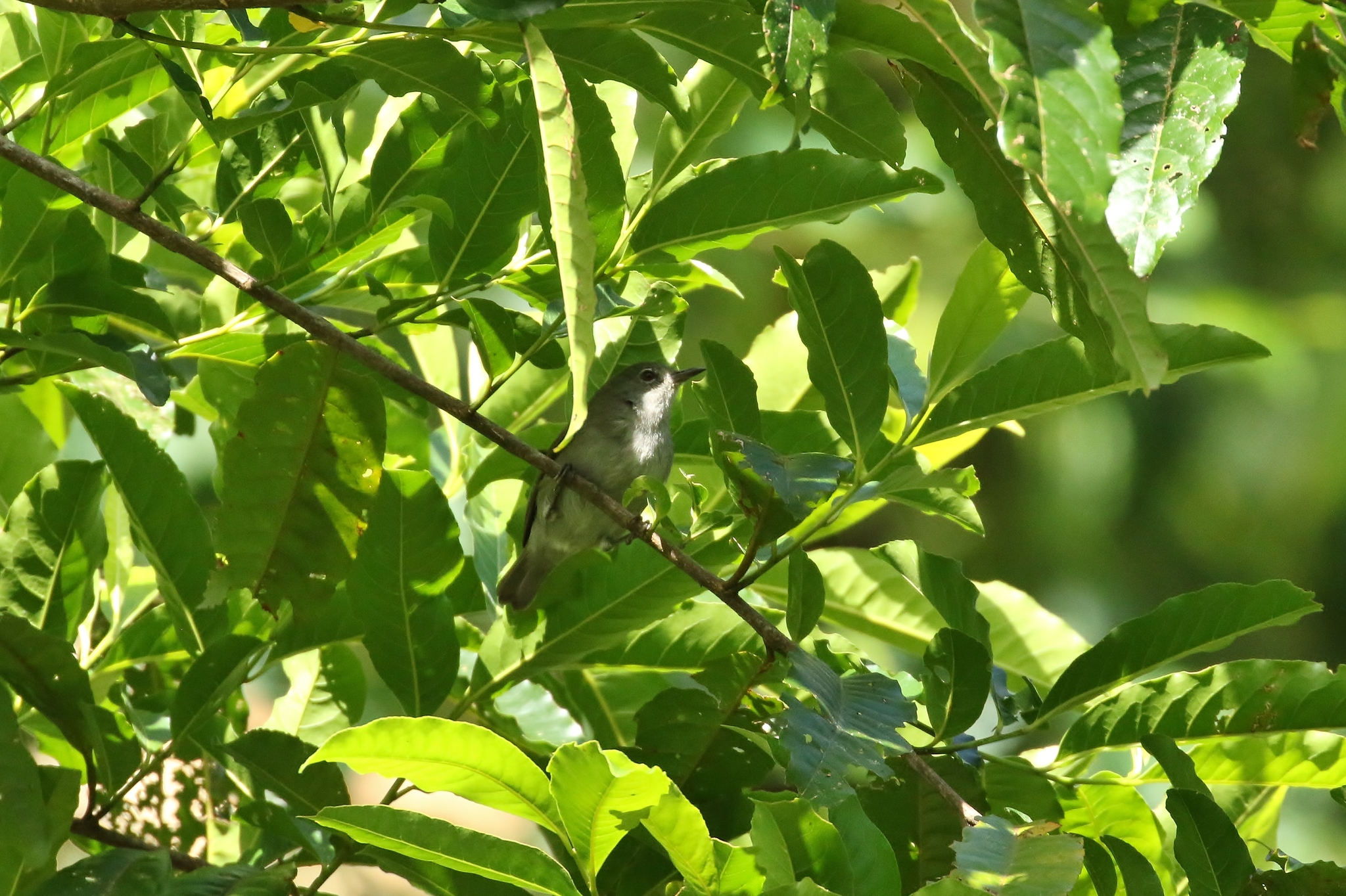

Conservation status
- Least Concern (IUCN 3.1)

Scientific classification
- Kingdom: Animalia
- Phylum: Chordata
- Class: Aves
- Order: Passeriformes
- Family: Zosteropidae
- Genus: Zosterops
- Species: Z. ponapensis

Binomial name
- Zosterops ponapensis Finsch, 1876

= Grey-brown white-eye =

Species of bird

The grey-brown white-eye or Pohnpei white-eye (Zosterops ponapensis) is a species of bird in the family Zosteropidae. It is endemic to Pohnpei.

This species and the Kosrae white-eye were formerly considered conspecific.

Its natural habitat is subtropical or tropical moist lowland forest.
