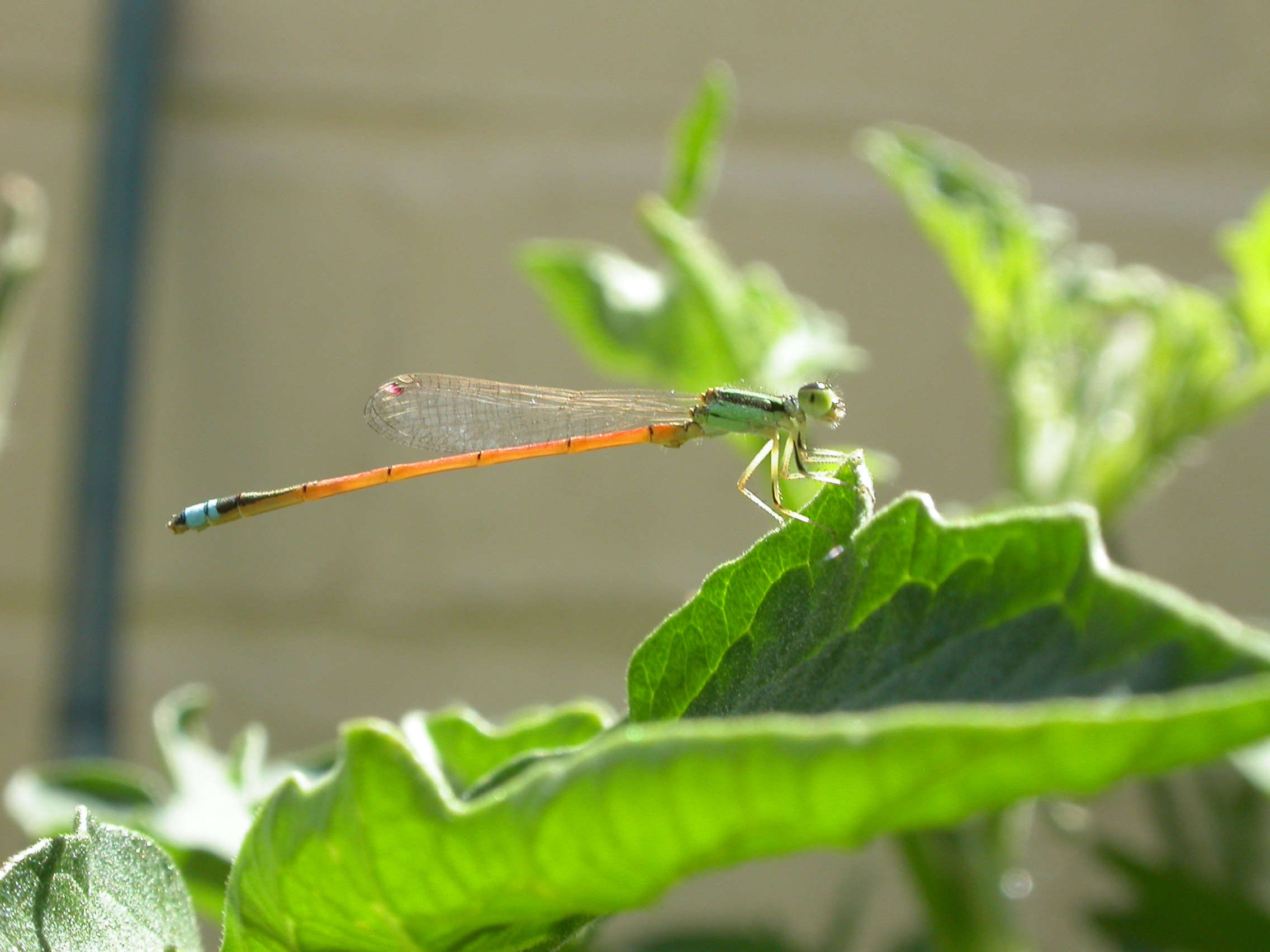
- male

Conservation status
- Least Concern (IUCN 3.1)

Scientific classification
- Kingdom: Animalia
- Phylum: Arthropoda
- Clade: Pancrustacea
- Class: Insecta
- Order: Odonata
- Suborder: Zygoptera
- Family: Coenagrionidae
- Genus: Ischnura
- Species: I. aurora

Binomial name
- Ischnura aurora (Brauer, 1865)

Synonyms
- Agrion aurora Brauer, 1865; Agrion spinicauda Brauer, 1865; Ischnura delicata Hagen, 1876; Agriocnemis amelia Needham, 1930; Ischnura rhodosoma Lieftinck, 1959

= Ischnura aurora =

Golden dartlet

Species of damselfly

Ischnura aurora,, the gossamer damselfy or golden dartlet and also known as the aurora bluetail, is a species of damselfly in the family Coenagrionidae.

== Adults ==
A small apple green damselfly with black thoracic stripes and blue tipped yellow tail.

Male

Eyes: Black half moon-like cap above, olive green to dark olive below, which fades to pale olive beneath. Two azure blue spots are present behind the eyes. Thorax: Shining black with two pale grass green stripes; sides are light green and white below. Legs: Pale greenish white with a vertical stripe on the femur, just above the femur - tibia joint. Wings: Transparent. Wing spots: The wing spots are different in fore and hindwings, being rose-red on the forewings and uniform pale grey on the hindwings. Abdomen: Bright reddish yellow. The upper parts of the second and seventh segments have narrow and broad black marks, respectively. A third of the length of the eighth segment and the full length of the ninth segment are blue. The base color of the eighth segment tergite is melanic black.

Female

Eyes: Brown half moon-like cap above, green to pale green below. Thorax: Shining black with two orange stripes; sides are pale green. Legs: Pale white with vertical black stripes on femur, just above femur - tibia joint. Abdomen: A broad black stripe runs along the upper side of abdomen. The eight to tenth segments do not have azure blue markings.

== Habitat ==
Ischnura aurora habitat is among vegetation along the banks of ponds, rivers, canals, marshes and wet rice fields.

== Distribution ==
Ischnura aurora is found across Australia, the Pacific Islands, East Asia and Southeast Asia. There are strong differences in DNA between the Asian forms of the species and specimens from the Pacific. The form found on the Indian subcontinent and in Iran is Ischnura aurora rubilio (Selys, 1876) and is now considered a different taxon, Ischnura rubilio.

== Etymology ==
The genus name Ischnura is derived from the Greek ἰσχνός (ischnos, "thin" or "slender") and οὐρά (oura, "tail"), referring to the slender abdomen of species in the genus.

The species name aurora is of uncertain origin. Aurora is Latin for "dawn" or "break of day", and is also the name of the Roman goddess of dawn, associated in mythology with the morning dew.

== Gallery ==
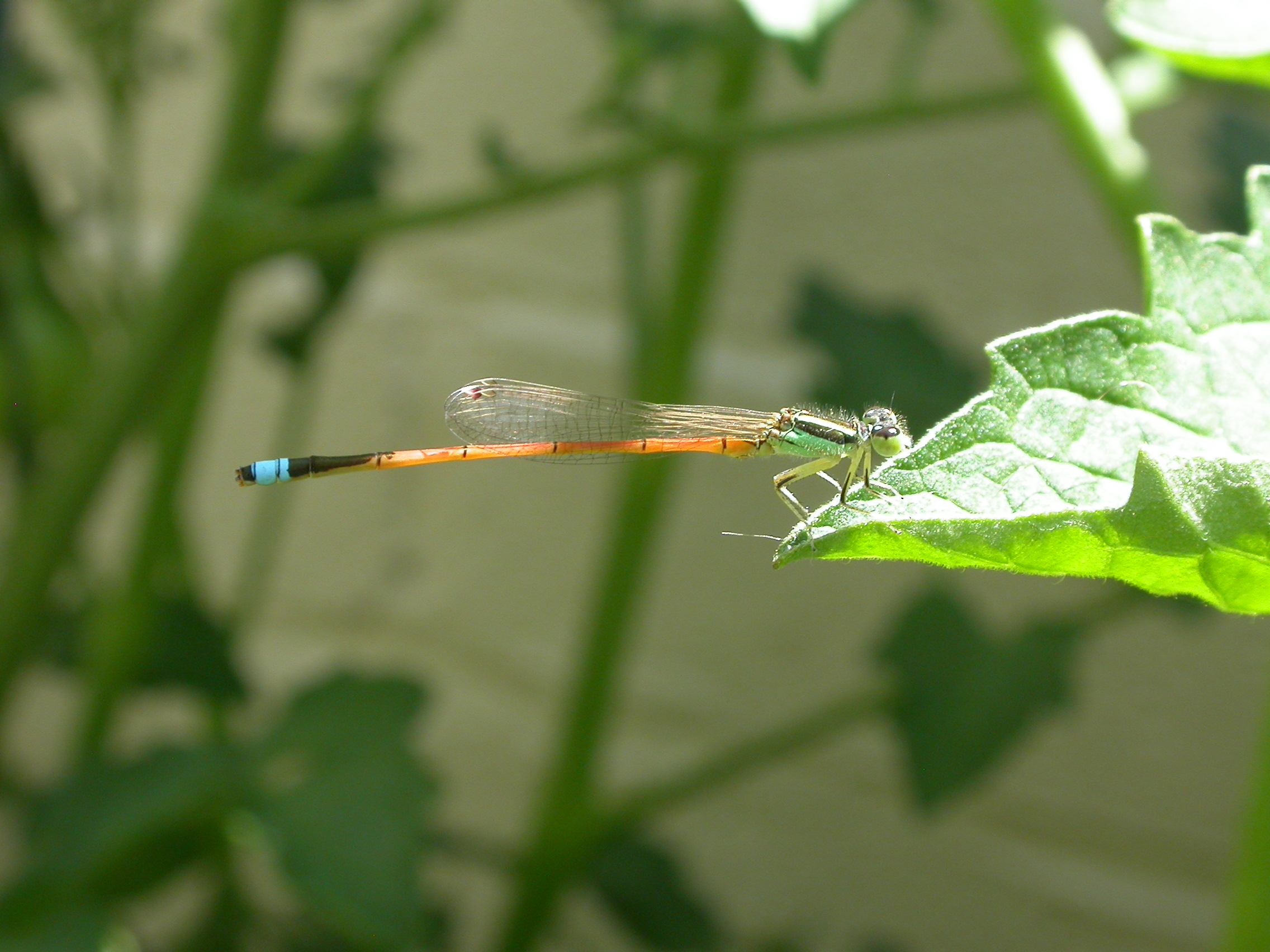
Male in Australia

Illustration of Ischnura aurora wing

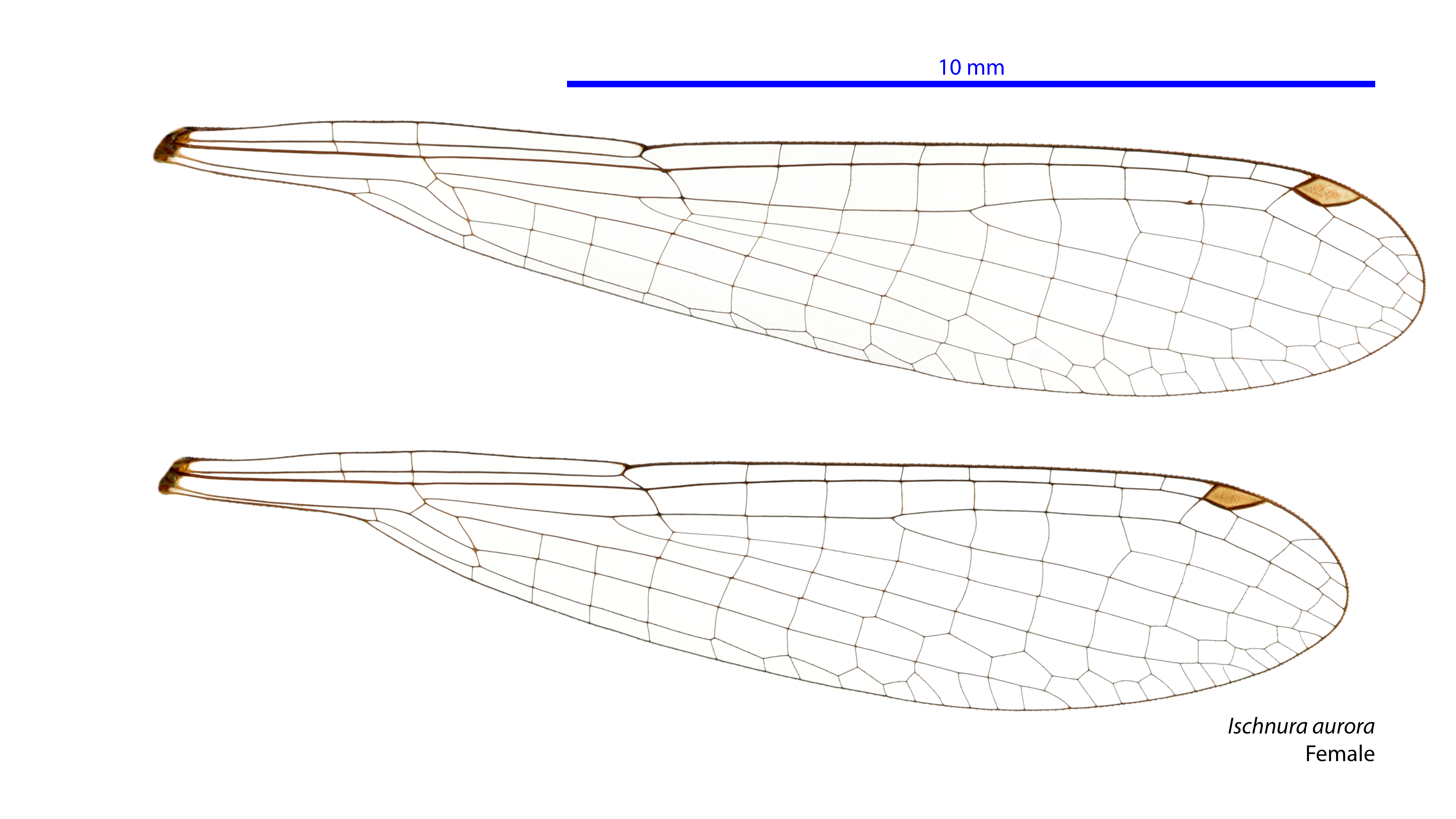
Photo of female wings

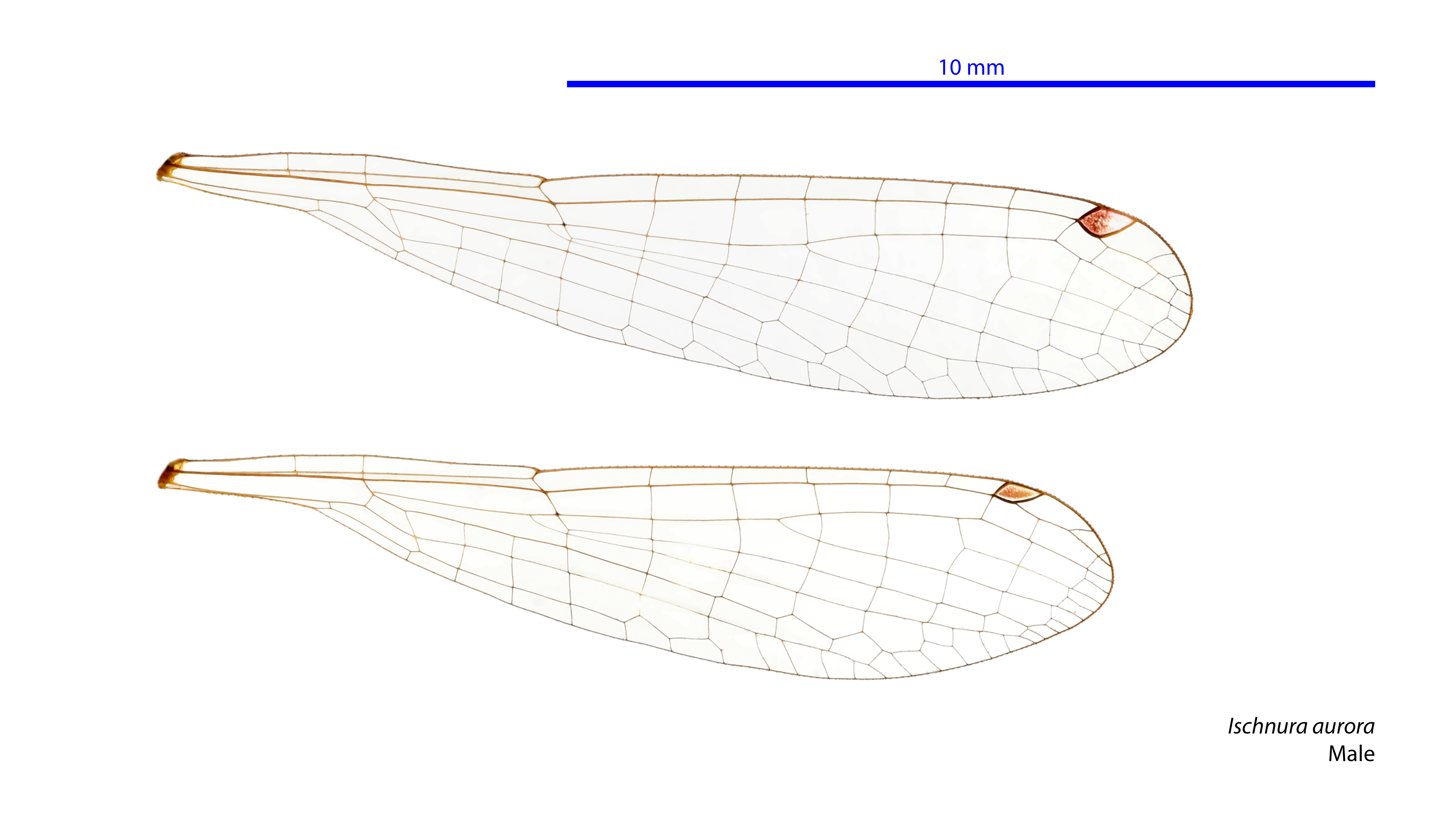
Photo of male wings

== See also ==
- List of Odonata species of Australia
