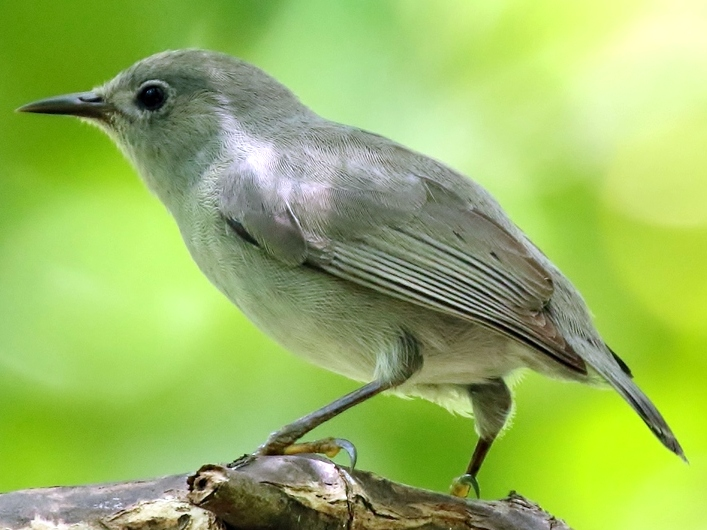

Conservation status
- Least Concern (IUCN 3.1)

Scientific classification
- Kingdom: Animalia
- Phylum: Chordata
- Class: Aves
- Order: Passeriformes
- Family: Zosteropidae
- Genus: Zosterops
- Species: Z. cinereus

Binomial name
- Zosterops cinereus (Kittlitz, 1832)

= Kosrae white-eye =

Species of bird

The Kosrae white-eye (Zosterops cinereus) is a species of bird in the family Zosteropidae. It is endemic to Kosrae Island. This species and the grey-brown white-eye were formerly considered conspecific.

Its natural habitat is subtropical or tropical moist lowland forest.
