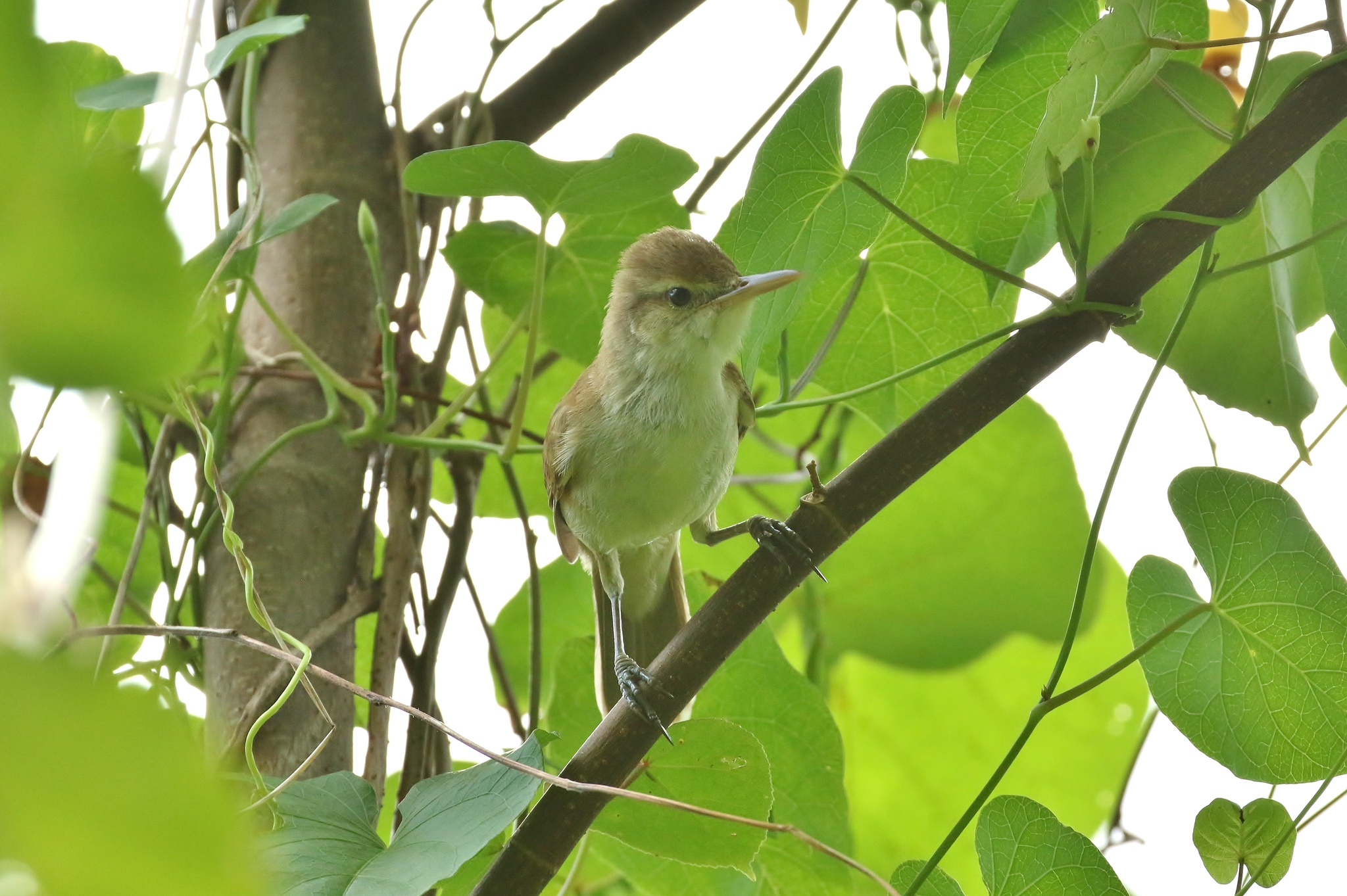
- On Sokeh's Island, Pohnpei

Conservation status
- Least Concern (IUCN 3.1)

Scientific classification
- Kingdom: Animalia
- Phylum: Chordata
- Class: Aves
- Order: Passeriformes
- Family: Acrocephalidae
- Genus: Acrocephalus
- Species: A. syrinx

Binomial name
- Acrocephalus syrinx (Kittlitz, 1833)
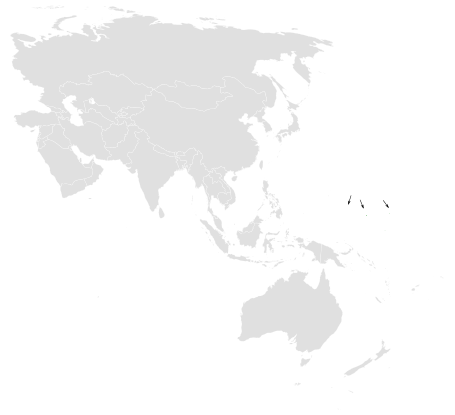

= Caroline reed warbler =

Species of bird

The Caroline reed warbler or Caroline Islands reed warbler (Acrocephalus syrinx) is a species of Old World warbler in the family Acrocephalidae. It is found only on the Caroline Islands in Micronesia.
