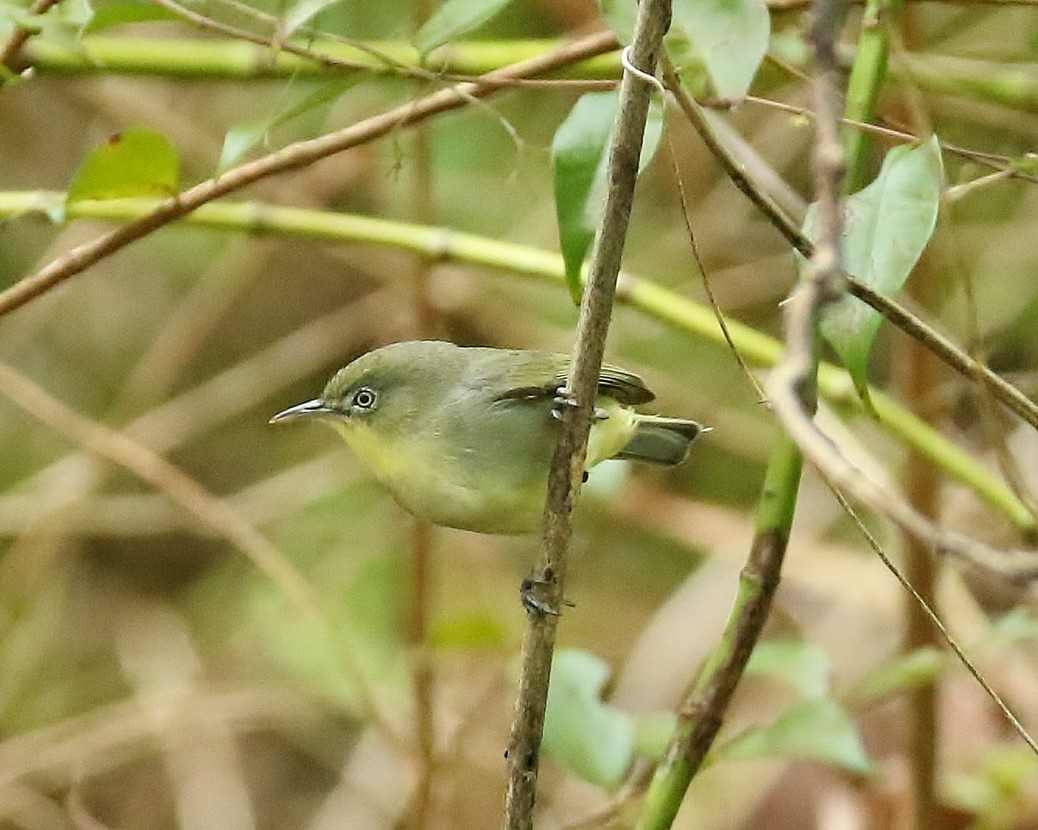

Conservation status
- Near Threatened (IUCN 3.1)

Scientific classification
- Kingdom: Animalia
- Phylum: Chordata
- Class: Aves
- Order: Passeriformes
- Family: Zosteropidae
- Genus: Zosterops
- Species: Z. hypolais

Binomial name
- Zosterops hypolais Hartlaub & Finsch, 1872

= Plain white-eye =

Species of bird

The plain white-eye (Zosterops hypolais) is a species of bird in the family Zosteropidae. It is endemic to Yap. The indigenous name in the Yapese language is "Alingithngith", which applies to both species of Zosterops found in Yap.

Its natural habitat is subtropical or tropical moist lowland forests.
