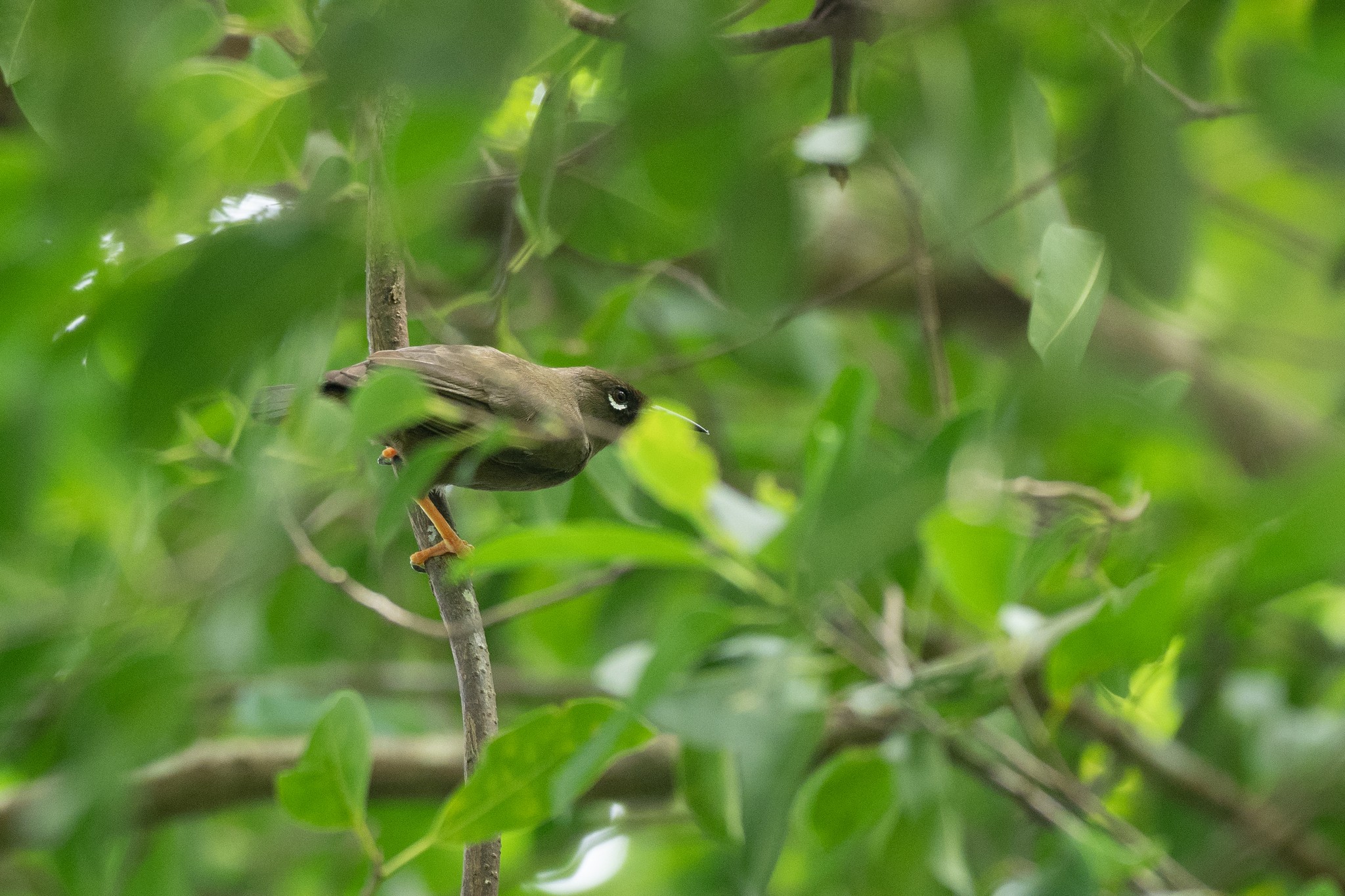

Conservation status
- Endangered (IUCN 3.1)

Scientific classification
- Kingdom: Animalia
- Phylum: Chordata
- Class: Aves
- Order: Passeriformes
- Family: Zosteropidae
- Genus: Rukia
- Species: R. ruki

Binomial name
- Rukia ruki (Hartert, 1897)

= Teardrop white-eye =

Species of bird

The teardrop white-eye (Rukia ruki), also known as the Faichuk white-eye, Truk white-eye, or great Truk white-eye, is a species of bird in the family Zosteropidae. Some advocate that it is the only true member of the genus Rukia, or the "great white-eyes".

== Distribution and habitat ==
It is endemic to the summit of Mount Winipot on Tol, in the Faichuk group of islands within the Chuuk (Truk) atoll in Micronesia. Its habitat is montane rainforest dominated by the endemic Chuuk poisontree. Due to its restricted range on one small mountaintop and the locals' disdain for the native poisontree, it is severely threatened by habitat loss.
