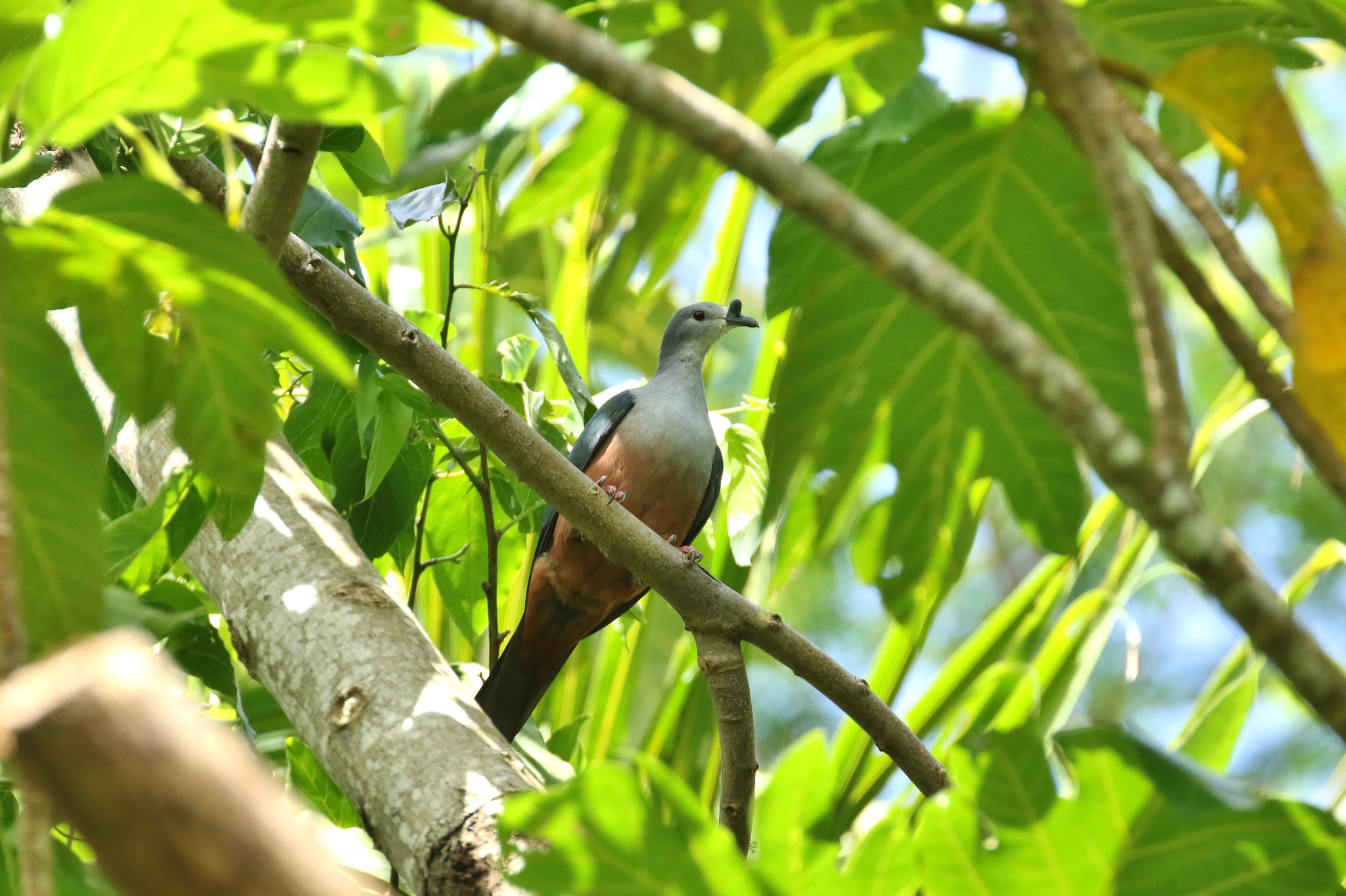

Conservation status
- Vulnerable (IUCN 3.1)

Scientific classification
- Kingdom: Animalia
- Phylum: Chordata
- Class: Aves
- Order: Columbiformes
- Family: Columbidae
- Genus: Ducula
- Species: D. oceanica

Binomial name
- Ducula oceanica (Desmarest, 1826)

Synonyms
- Columba oceanica Desmarest, 1826

= Micronesian imperial pigeon =

Species of bird

The Micronesian imperial pigeon (Ducula oceanica), also known as the Micronesian pigeon, and Belochel is a species of bird in the family Columbidae (doves). It is found in Palau, the Caroline Islands, the Marshall Islands and Nauru. Its habitats include montane forests, secondary forests, forests on beaches, and mangroves. It is threatened by hunting and deforestation, and the IUCN has assessed it as a near-threatened species.

== Taxonomy ==
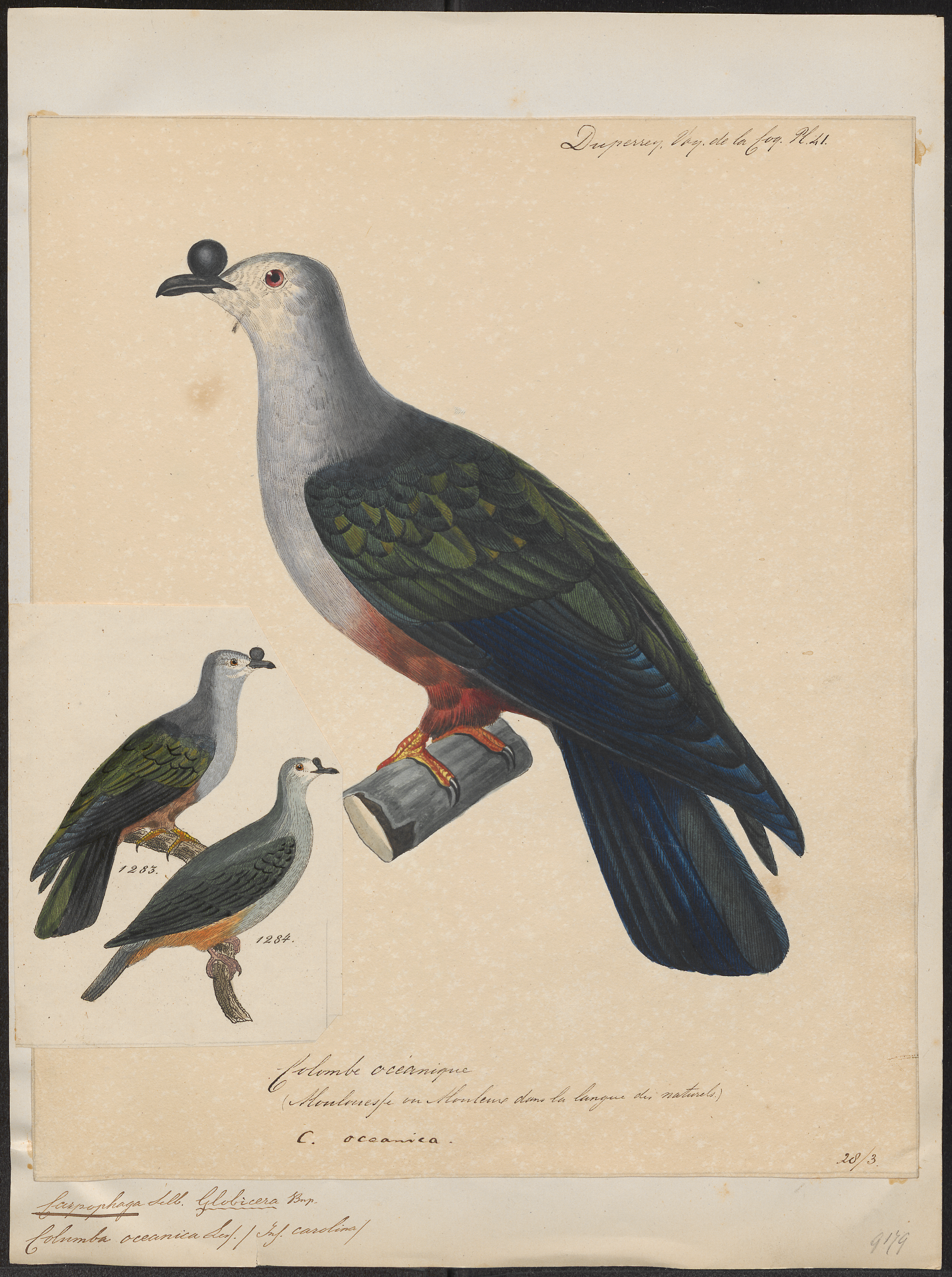
Illustration

The species was first described as Columba oceanica in 1826. The binomial authority was formerly considered to be Lesson & Garnot, but it is now given as Desmarest. Five subspecies are recognized: D. o. monacha in Palau and Yap, D. o. teraokai on Chuuk, D. o. townsendi on Pohnpei, D. o. oceanica on Kosrae, and D. o. ratakensis in the Marshall Islands.

== Description ==
The Micronesian imperial pigeon is about 36 cm (14 in) long and weighs 340–406 g (12.0–14.3 oz). The head and neck are ashy grey. The back and wing coverts are dark green, reflecting dark blue. The flight feathers are blackish, with a green gloss. The breast is light grey, and the vent is dark rufous. The tail is blackish above and dark brown below. The beak is slaty black, and the cere is black. The eyes are reddish brown, and the feet are purplish red. The female and the juvenile birds are darker. The subspecies are distinguished by their size and the colour of their heads. This species of bird makes many different types of calls, which can sound like barking, cooing, or moaning. It can probably fly pretty well.

== Distribution and habitat ==
The Micronesian imperial pigeon is found in the Marshall Islands, Yap, Chuuk, Pohnpei and Kosrae of Micronesia, Nauru, Kiribati and Palau. The populations on many of the Marshall Islands are probably extinct. On Pohnpei and Kosrae, it mostly lives in the mountains. In areas where it is not hunted, it is found in secondary forest, forest on beaches, and mangroves. It also occurs in coconut plantations.

The species also occurred once in the Mariana Islands, where Holocene subfossil remains are found.

== Behaviour ==
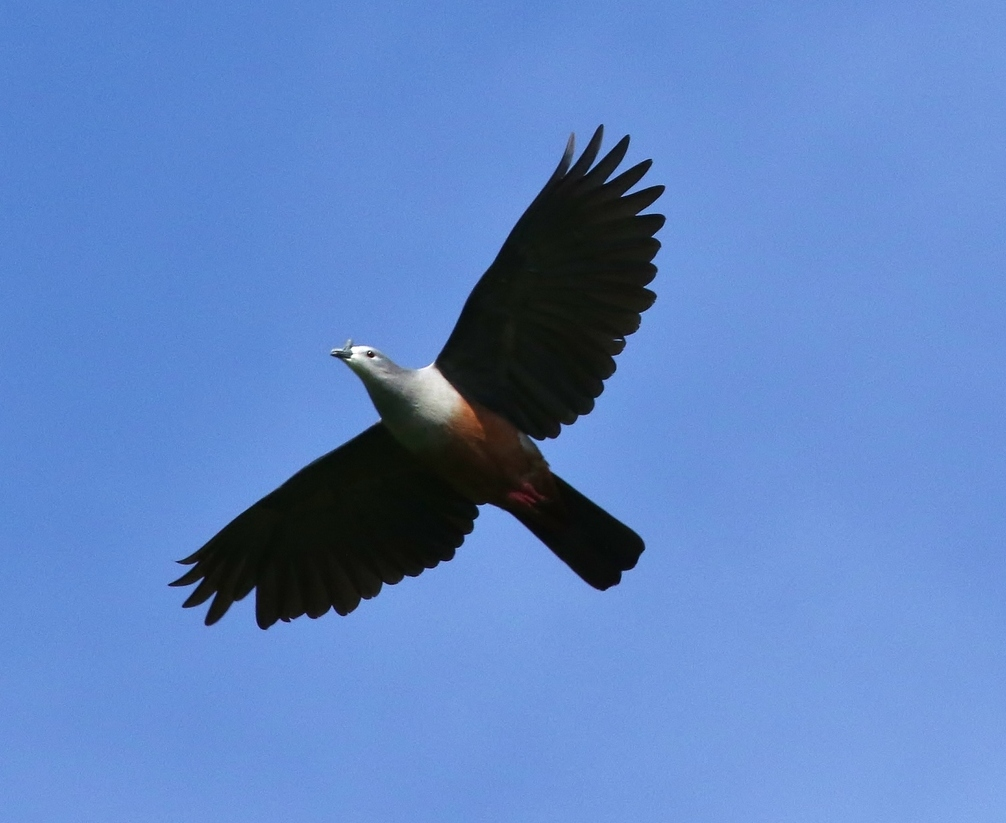
In flight

This pigeon is mostly solitary, usually observed in the canopy. It eats fruits and fleshy seeds. Its calls include a deep-throated bark grrow-row-row-ow, a moan, and mellow coos. Almost nothing is known about its breeding. The breeding season is probably the entire year.

== Status ==
A 2005 survey in Palau found that, on Babeldaob and the Rock Islands, the species had declined but was still common. It was rare on Peleliu and was not recorded on Angaur. A 2006–2007 survey estimated that there were 75–100 individuals on Nauru. The number of individuals that monitoring stations observed decreased from 2005 to 2010. The population on the Majuro Atoll of the Marshall Islands was estimated at 80 in 2011, after a recovery programme of the Marshall Islands Conservation Society.

The Micronesian imperial pigeon is hunted, possibly causing the population decline on Palau and Nauru. It is also threatened by deforestation. Because of these threats, the population is probably declining. The International Union for Conservation of Nature has therefore assessed the species as Vulnerable.
