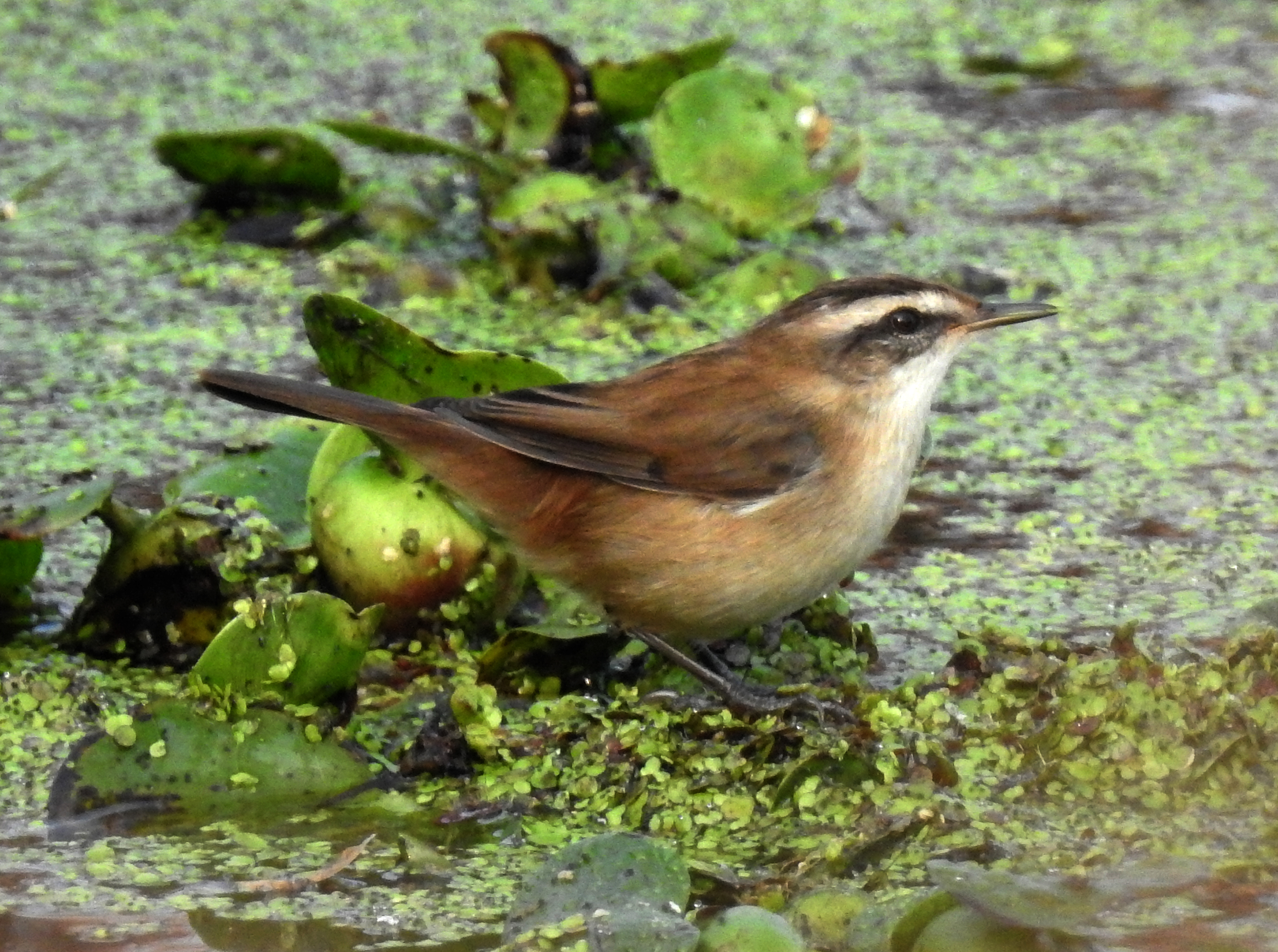
- In Bharatpur, Rajasthan, India

Conservation status
- Least Concern (IUCN 3.1)

Scientific classification
- Kingdom: Animalia
- Phylum: Chordata
- Class: Aves
- Order: Passeriformes
- Family: Acrocephalidae
- Genus: Acrocephalus
- Species: A. melanopogon

Binomial name
- Acrocephalus melanopogon (Temminck, 1823)

Subspecies
- A. m. melanopogon - (Temminck, 1823); A. m. mimicus - (Madarász, 1903); A. m. albiventris - (Kazakov, 1974)
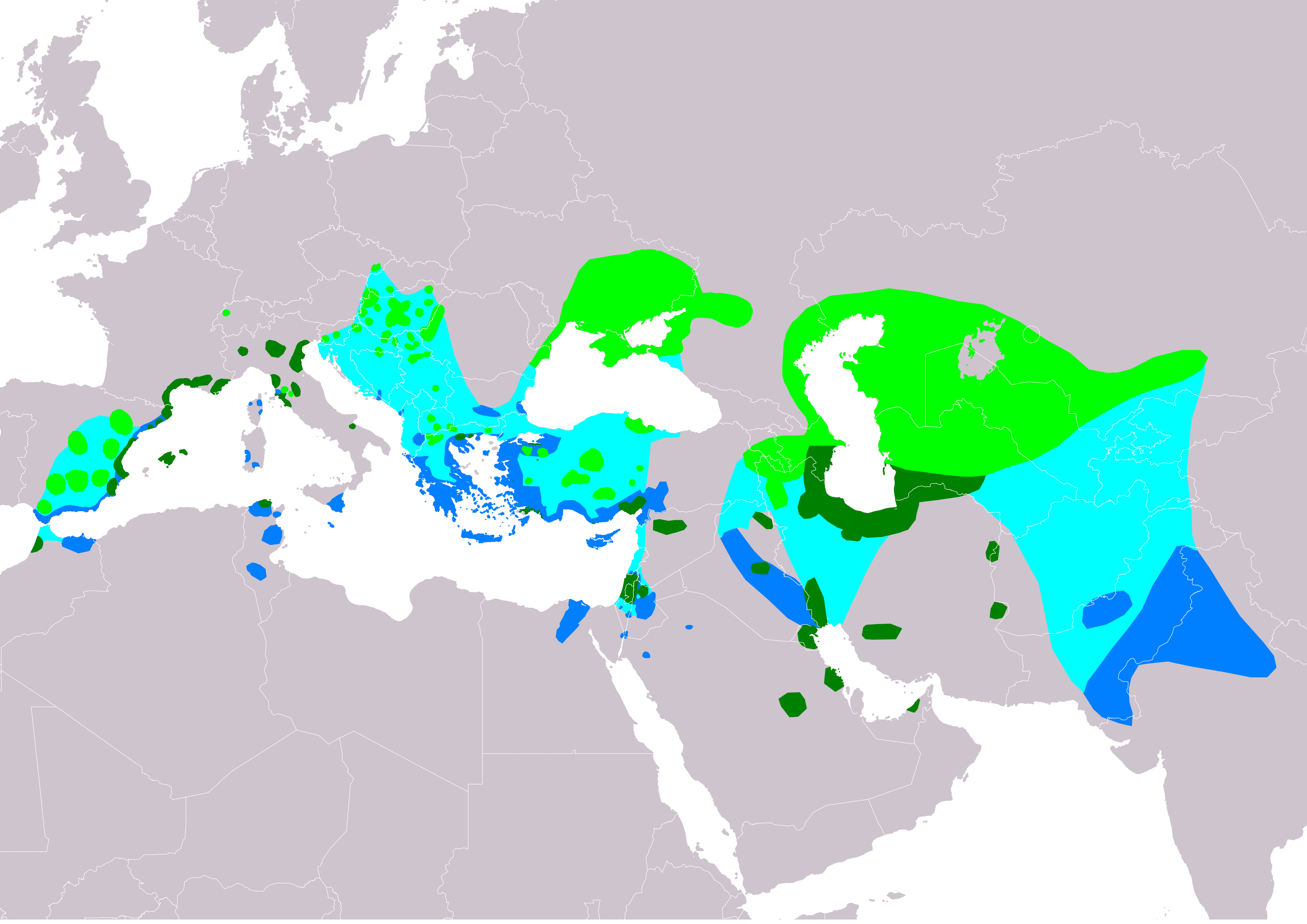
- Range of A. melanopogon Breeding Resident Passage Non-breeding

Synonyms
- Sylvia melanopogon (protonym)

= Moustached warbler =

Species of bird

The moustached warbler (Acrocephalus melanopogon) is an Old World warbler in the genus Acrocephalus. It breeds in southern Europe and southern temperate Asia with a few breeding in north-west Africa. It is partially migratory. South-west European birds are resident, south-east European birds winter in the Mediterranean breeding range, and the Asiatic race migrates to Arabia, India and Pakistan.

== Taxonomy ==
The moustached warbler was formally described and illustrated in 1823 by the Dutch zoologist Coenraad Jacob Temminck based on a specimen collected near Rome in Italy. He coined the binomial name Sylvia melanopogon. The moustached warbler is now one of 42 warblers placed in the genus Acrocephalus that was introduced in 1811 by the German naturalist Johann Andreas Naumann and his son Johann Friedrich Naumann. The genus name combines the Ancient Greek ακρος/akros meaning "point" or "crest" with -κεφαλος/-kephalos meaning "-headed". The specific epithet melanopogon combines the Ancient Greek μελας/melas, μελανος/melanos meaning "black" with πωγων/pōgōn, πωγωνος/pōgōnos meaning "beard".

Three subspecies are recognised:

- A. m. melanopogon (Temminck, 1823) – south Europe to Ukraine and west Turkey, northwest Africa
- A. m. mimicus (Madarász, G, 1903) – east Turkey to south Russia, Kazakhstan, northwest China, Iran and Iraq
- A. m. albiventris (Kazakov, 1974) – southeast Ukraine and southwest Russia

== Description ==
The moustached warbler is 12–13 cm (4.7–5.1 in) long, slightly smaller than the similar sedge warbler (Acrocephalus schoenobaenus). The adult has a finely streaked brown back and white underparts. The forehead is flattened, there is a prominent whitish supercilium, grey ear coverts, and the bill is strong and pointed. The sexes are identical, as with most warblers, but young birds are more heavily streaked and have markings on the breast.

The song is fast and similar to the sedge warbler and reed warbler, with some mimicry and typically acrocephaline whistles added. Its song is softer and more melodious than those of its relatives, and includes phrases reminiscent of the nightingale. Unlike the sedge warbler, it does not sing in flight.

== Distribution and habitat ==
It is scarce north of its range, but has occurred as a very rare vagrant as far as Poland and Denmark. There have been a few reports from Great Britain, including a pair breeding in Cambridgeshire in 1946, but these records have recently been removed from the official list of British birds, being unconvincingly distinguished from sedge warblers or paddyfield warblers. It is found in upright aquatic vegetation such as reeds and sedge.

Song Scarlino marsh, Italy

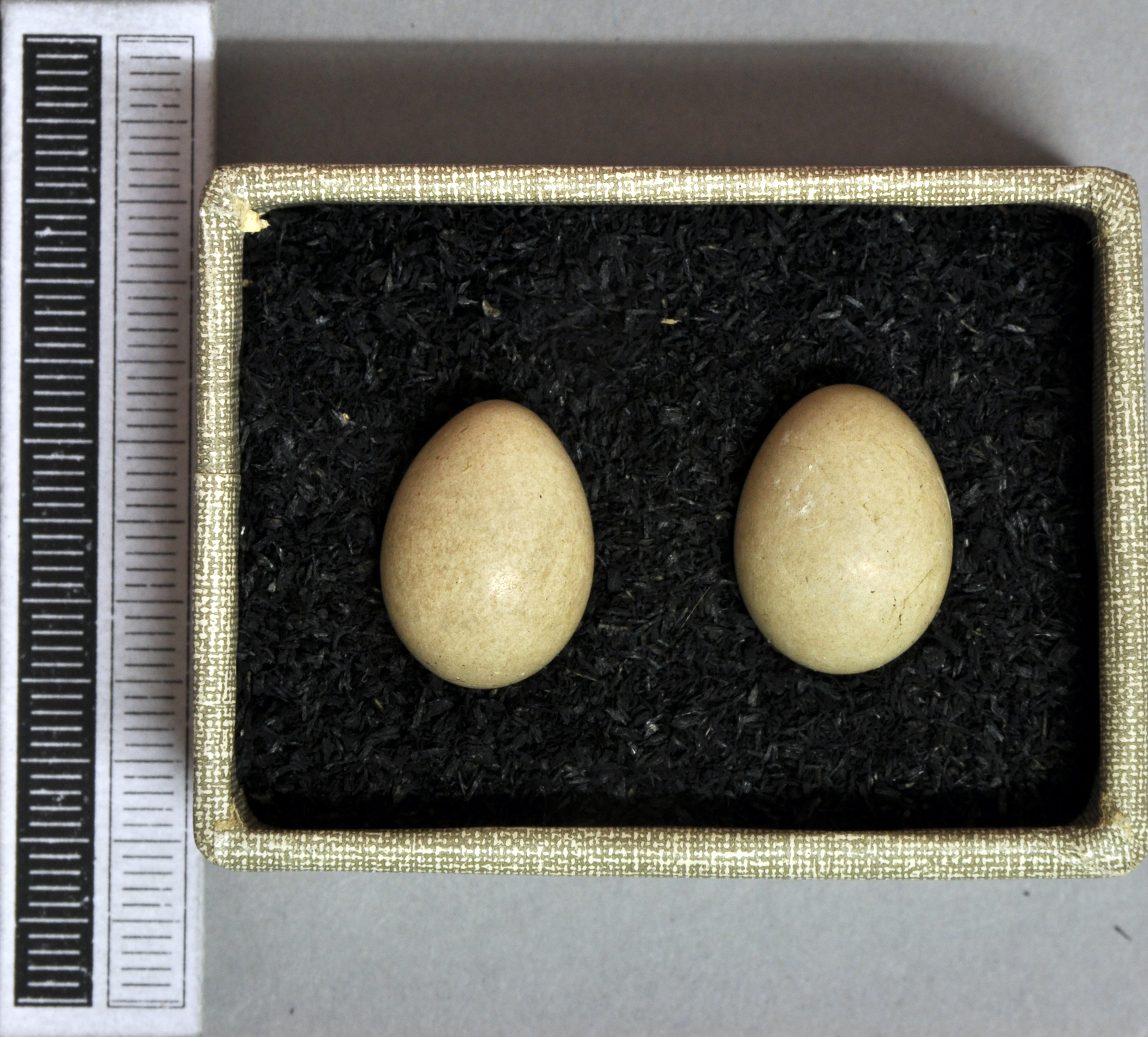
Eggs, Collection Museum Wiesbaden

== Behaviour ==
=== Feeding ===
Like most warblers, it is insectivorous.

=== Breeding ===
The moustached warbler is usually monogamous. The deep cup nest is built by the female suspended over water among reeds or rushes or in a bush. A clutch of 3 to 6 eggs are laid from mid-April. They are incubated by both sexes for 13 to 15 days. Both parents feed the young. They leave the nest after around 12 days and become independent of their parents 18-22 days after fledging. Two broods are raised each year.
