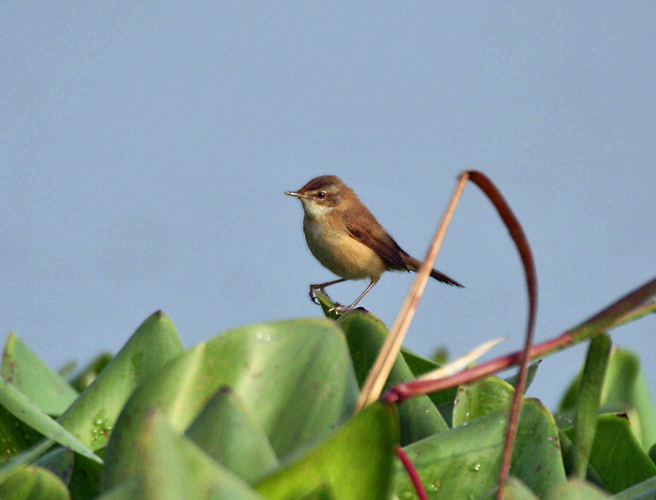
- In Kolkata, West Bengal, India

Conservation status
- Least Concern (IUCN 3.1)

Scientific classification
- Kingdom: Animalia
- Phylum: Chordata
- Class: Aves
- Order: Passeriformes
- Family: Acrocephalidae
- Genus: Acrocephalus
- Species: A. agricola

Binomial name
- Acrocephalus agricola (Jerdon, 1845)

Subspecies
- A. a. agricola - (Jerdon, 1845); A. a. septimus - Gavrilenko, 1954
- Range of A. agricola Breeding Non-breeding

= Paddyfield warbler =

Species of bird

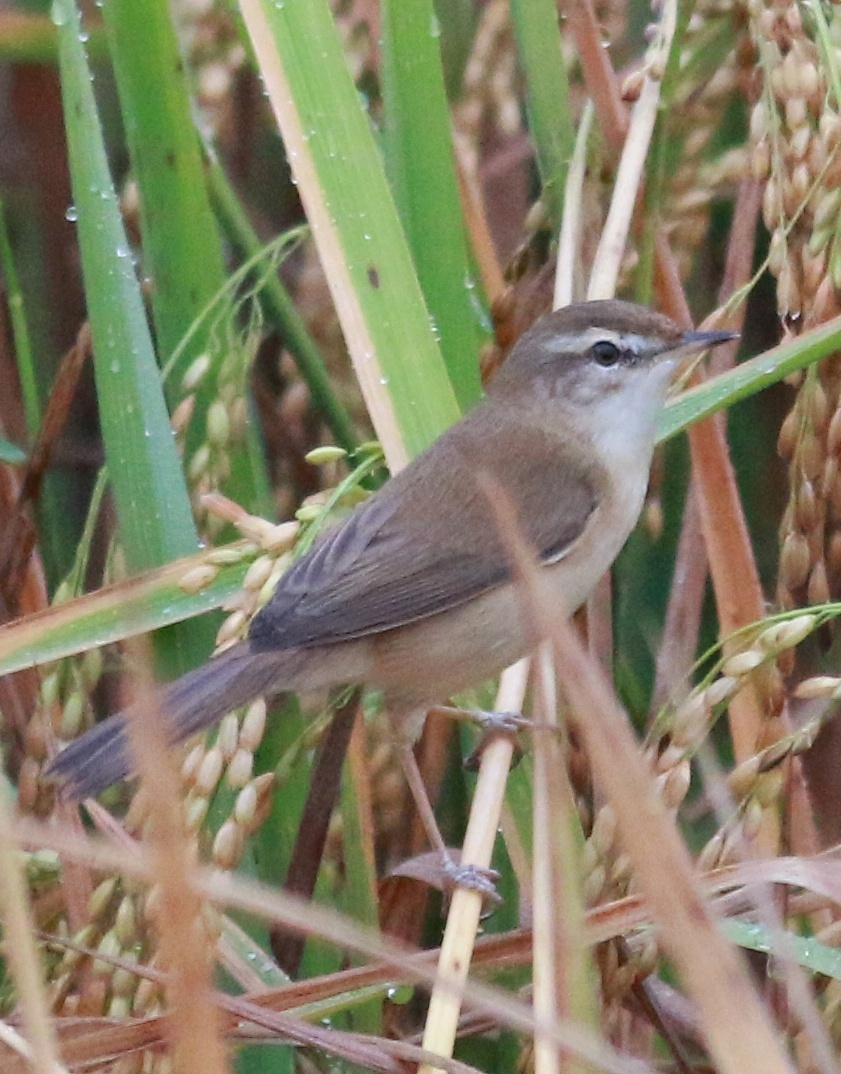
In Kerala, India

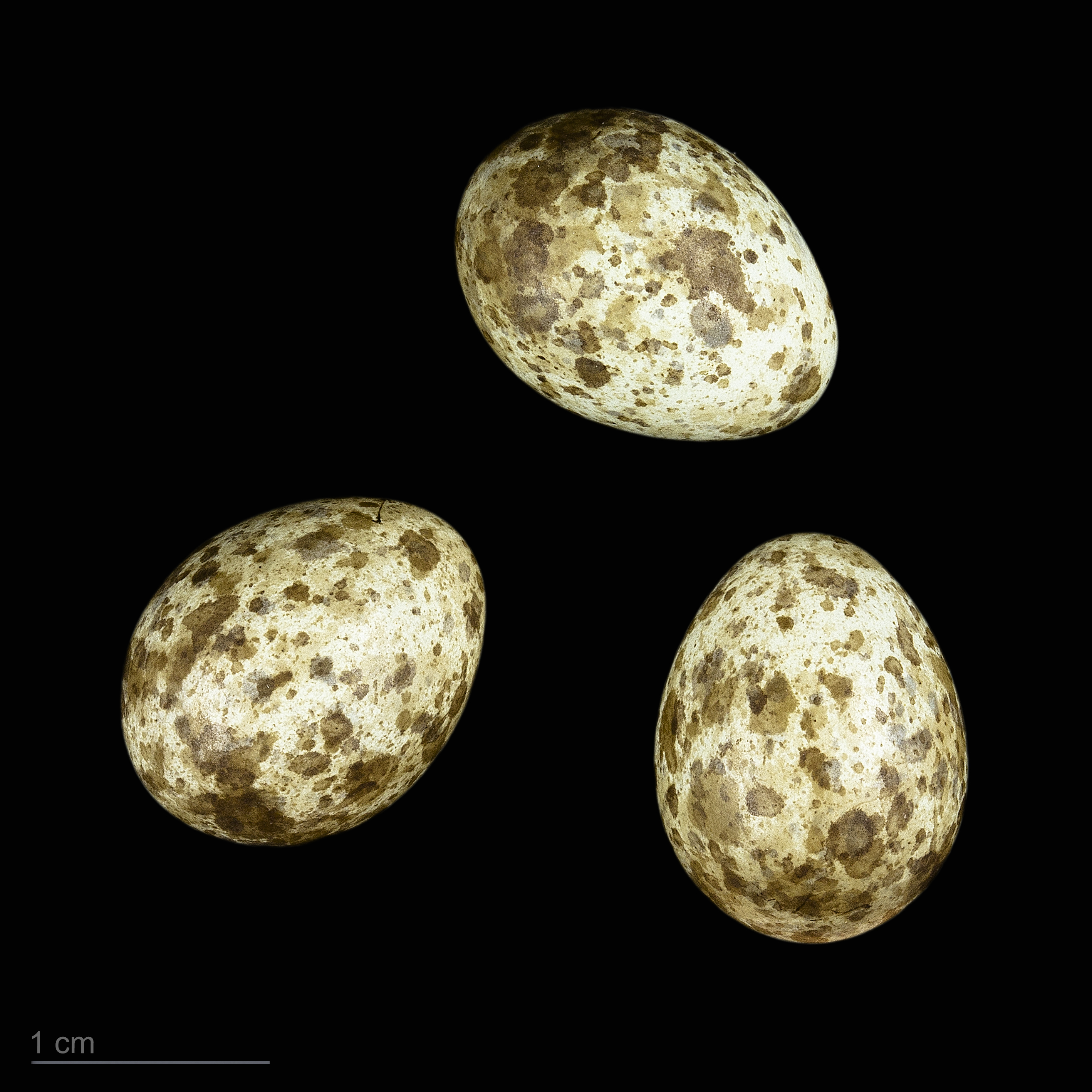
Acrocephalus agricola - MHNT

The paddyfield warbler (Acrocephalus agricola) is a species of marsh warbler (family Acrocephalidae). It was formerly included in the "Old World warbler" assemblage. The Manchurian reed warbler (A. tangorum) was (and sometimes still is) included in A. agricola as a subspecies.

The genus name Acrocephalus is from Ancient Greek akros, "highest", and kephale, "head". It is possible that Naumann and Naumann thought akros meant "sharp-pointed". The specific agricola is from Latin and means "farmer".

It breeds in the temperate central Palearctic. It is migratory, wintering in Bangladesh, India and Pakistan. It is a rare vagrant to western Europe although there are small breeding populations along the western shores of the Black Sea around the border between Bulgaria and Romania. This passerine bird is a species found in low vegetation such as long grass, reeds and rice. 4–5 eggs are laid in a nest in grass.

At 13 cm (5.1 in) long with a wingspan of 15–17.5 cm (5.9–6.9 in), the paddyfield warbler is close in size to the Eurasian reed warbler but with shorter bill and wingspan. The adult has an unstreaked pale brown back and buff underparts, with a warm brown rump. There is a clearer whitish supercilium and the bill is short and pointed. The sexes are identical, as with most warblers, but young birds are richer buff below. Like most warblers, it is insectivorous.

The song is fast and similar to marsh warbler, with much mimicry and typically acrocephaline whistles added. Its song is weaker and more rhythmic than that of its relative.
