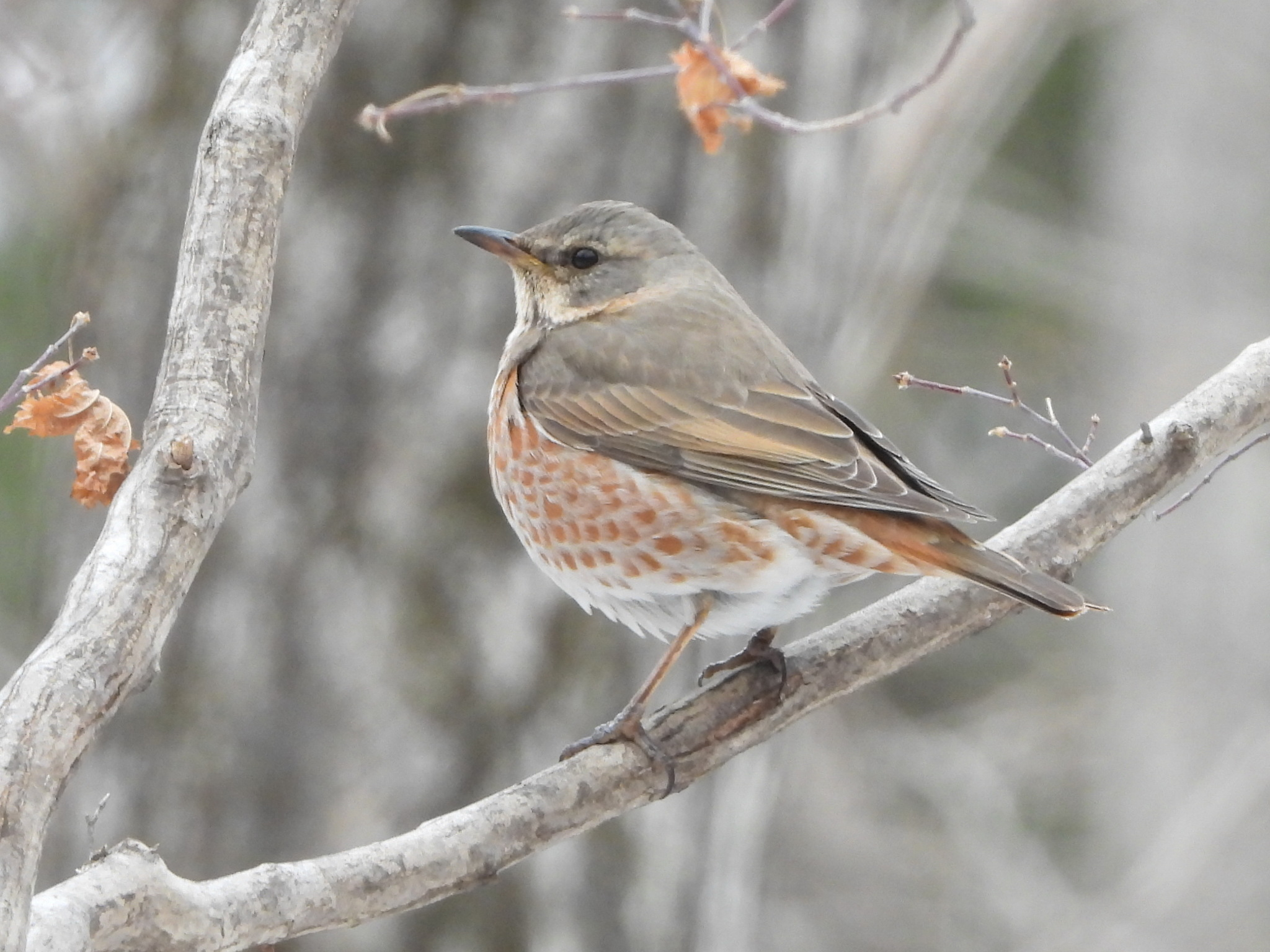
- In Russia

Conservation status
- Least Concern (IUCN 3.1)

Scientific classification
- Kingdom: Animalia
- Phylum: Chordata
- Class: Aves
- Order: Passeriformes
- Family: Turdidae
- Genus: Turdus
- Species: T. naumanni

Binomial name
- Turdus naumanni Temminck, 1820

= Naumann's thrush =

Species of bird

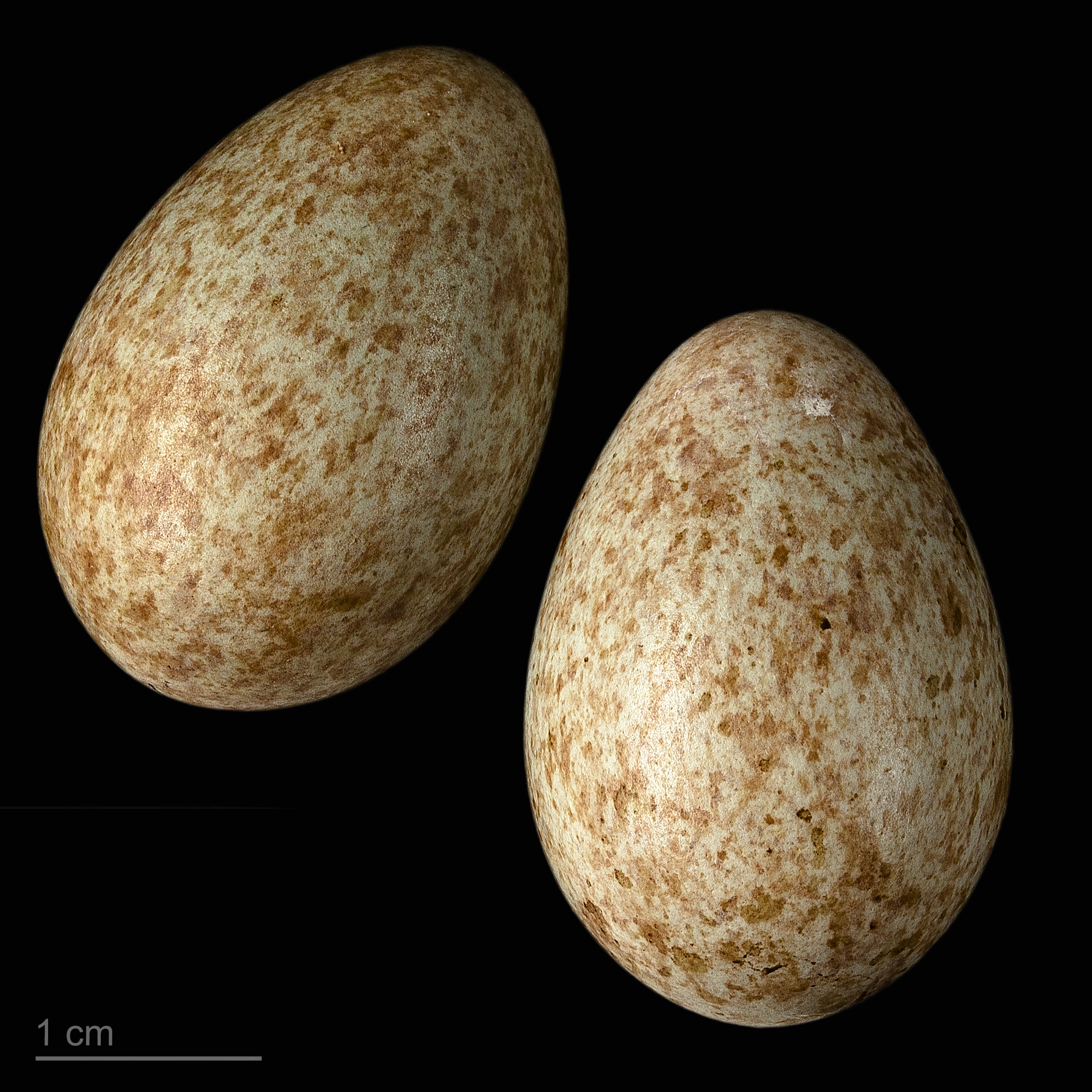
Turdus naumanni - MHNT

Naumann's thrush (Turdus naumanni) is a species of the thrush family Turdidae which breeds eastwards from central Siberia to North Manchuria, Amurland and Sakhalin. It is closely related to the more northerly breeding dusky thrush T. eunomus; the two have often been regarded as conspecific.

This species breeds in open woodland areas; dusky thrush, as would be expected, is more tolerant of mountainous and tundra-edge habitats. This species is strongly migratory, wintering South Asia to Southeast Asia, principally in China, Korea and neighboring countries. It is a rare vagrant to western Europe.

It nests in trees, laying 3-5 eggs in an untidy but neatly lined nest. Migrating birds and wintering birds often form small flocks. It is omnivorous, eating a wide range of insects, especially mosquitoes, earthworms and berries.

This is a medium-sized but stocky thrush, reminiscent in structure of a small fieldfare. The underwing is reddish brown, and there is a pale supercilium.

Naumann's thrush has pale brown back and head. The face, breast, flank spots and rump are reddish, and the belly and undertail are white, whereas dusky thrush has a darker brown back and rump, and the face, breast, and flank spots rump are black. The belly and undertail are white.

The female is fairly similar to the male, but immatures have a weaker patterning.

The song of Naumann's thrush may differ from the simple fluted or whistling redwing-like song of dusky thrush.

The genus name comes from Latin Turdus, "thrush", and the species and English names commemorate the German naturalist Johann Andreas Naumann.
