= Zugunruhe =

Behavior in birds

Garden warbler displays Zugunruhe in the lab

Zugunruhe (/ˈtsuːk:ʊnʁuːə/; German: [tsuːk:ʊnʁuːə]; lit. 'migration-anxiety') is the experience of migratory restlessness.

== Ethology ==
In ethology, Zugunruhe describes anxious behavior in migratory animals, especially in birds during the normal migration period. When these animals are enclosed, such as in an Emlen funnel, Zugunruhe serves to study the seasonal cycles of the migratory syndrome. Zugunruhe involves increased activity towards and after dusk with changes in the normal sleep pattern.

"In accordance with their inherited calendars, birds get an urge to move. When migratory birds are held in captivity, they hop about, flutter their wings and flit from perch to perch just as birds of the same species are migrating in the wild. The caged birds ‘know’ they should be travelling too. This migratory restlessness, or Zugunruhe, was first described by Johann Andreas Naumann…[who] interpreted Zugunruhe to be an expression of the migratory instinct in birds." --William Fiennes, ‘The Snow Geese’

== Etymology ==
Zugunruhe is borrowed from German; it is a German compound word consisting of Zug, "move, migration," and unruhe (anxiety, restlessness). The word was first published in 1707, when it was used to describe the "inborn migratory urge" in captive migrants.

Though common nouns are normally not capitalised in English, Zugunruhe is sometimes capitalised following the German convention.

== Effect ==
Zugunruhe has been artificially induced in experiments by simulating long days. Some studies on white-crowned sparrows have suggested that prolactin is involved in the pre-migratory hyperphagia (feeding), fattening and Zugunruhe. However, others have found that prolactin may merely be associated with lipogenesis (fat accumulation).

Researchers have been able to study the endocrine controls and navigational mechanisms associated with migration by studying Zugunruhe.

The phenomenon of Zugunruhe was generally believed to be found only in migratory species; however, a study of a resident species has shown low-level Zugunruhe, including oriented activity, suggesting that the endogenous mechanisms for migratory behaviour may be present even in a resident species. Further suggestions for endogenous programs are provided by observations that the number of nights on which Zugunruhe is exhibited by caged migrants appears related to the distance of migration involved.
