= Nairobi Flyways Declaration =

International declaration on the conservation of migratory bird flyways

- Type: Declaration
- Signed: 11 September 2026
- Location: Nairobi, Kenya
- Signatories: 125+ partners, organisations and businesses
- Language: English

The Nairobi Flyways Declaration is an international conservation declaration concerning the protection of migratory birds and their migration routes (flyways). It was launched on 11 September 2026 during the Global Flyways Summit in Nairobi, Kenya, which was co-hosted by BirdLife International and Nature Kenya. The declaration calls for coordinated conservation action across entire flyways, recognising that migratory birds cross national borders and continents and cannot be effectively protected through isolated national efforts.

== Background ==
The declaration was developed in the context of growing concern over the conservation status of migratory birds and the habitats on which they depend during their annual movements. It was launched alongside the 2026 edition of State of the World's Birds, BirdLife International's assessment of the status of the world's birds, which focused for the first time entirely on migratory birds and their flyways.

The report assessed 1,843 migratory bird species and found that 45% were declining, while 200 species, or approximately one in nine, were threatened with extinction. It also reported that 58% of 1,099 key sites monitored over the previous decade were in poor or very poor condition.

The Global Flyways Summit was held in Nairobi from 8 to 11 September 2026 and was hosted by BirdLife International in collaboration with Nature Kenya. Representatives of governments, conservation agencies, non-governmental organisations, financial institutions and donors attended the summit to address threats to migratory birds and the habitats on which they depend.

== Declaration ==
The Nairobi Flyways Declaration recognises migratory birds as indicators of planetary health and describes flyways as ecological connections extending across national borders and continents. It argues that their conservation requires cooperation between countries and across different sectors of society.

The declaration calls for action in four principal areas:

- improving understanding of the importance and value of flyways to people and nature;
- strengthening cooperation across national borders and between different sectors;
- translating international commitments into national action; and
- securing immediate funding for flyway conservation.

The declaration also promotes the conservation of networks of breeding, stopover and non-breeding sites that migratory birds depend on throughout their annual cycles. Such sites can include wetlands, estuaries, grasslands and other habitats that also provide benefits to human communities.

== Signing ==
The declaration was launched at the Global Flyways Summit on 11 September 2026. The first signatory was Paul Matiku of Nature Kenya, followed by the elected chairs of BirdLife International's six regional networks: Africa, the Americas, Asia, Europe and Central Asia, the Middle East, and the Pacific.

BirdLife International reported that more than 125 partners, organisations and businesses had signed the declaration by 24 September 2026, with additional digital signatures continuing to arrive. Participants included conservation organisations, governments, scientific institutions and financial institutions.

Mongabay reported that more than 100 organisations had signed the declaration at the conclusion of the summit, pledging to integrate flyway conservation into development planning and finance.

== Global Flyways Summit ==
The declaration formed one of the principal outcomes of the second Global Flyways Summit, held in Nairobi in September 2026. The summit brought together representatives of conservation organisations, governments, scientific institutions and financial organisations to discuss the conservation of migratory birds and the financing of flyway-scale conservation.

The summit also addressed the role of development finance in flyway conservation. BirdLife International reported that development banks had mobilised more than US$6 billion in conservation finance since 2021 and announced a framework intended to incorporate flyway conservation into development financing decisions.

Representatives of BirdLife International described the involvement of multilateral development banks as an opportunity to integrate biodiversity and flyway conservation into broader economic and development decisions.

== Financing ==
The summit was accompanied by financial commitments directed towards the conservation of migratory bird flyways. The Asian Development Bank committed to mobilising US$3 billion over the following decade to protect at least 50 priority wetlands along the East Asian–Australasian Flyway. The Development Bank of Latin America and the Caribbean announced plans to raise between US$3 billion and US$5 billion through 2050 to safeguard more than 30 landscapes and seascapes. The World Bank and BirdLife International were also working to mobilise several billion dollars for flyway conservation across Africa, Europe and Asia.

== Reception ==
The declaration was presented by its organisers as a framework for coordinated conservation at the scale of entire migration routes rather than individual countries. Independent coverage described it as a commitment by participating organisations to integrate migratory-bird conservation into development planning and finance.

== See also ==
- Bird migration
- Flyway
- Migratory bird
- BirdLife International
- Global Flyways Summit
