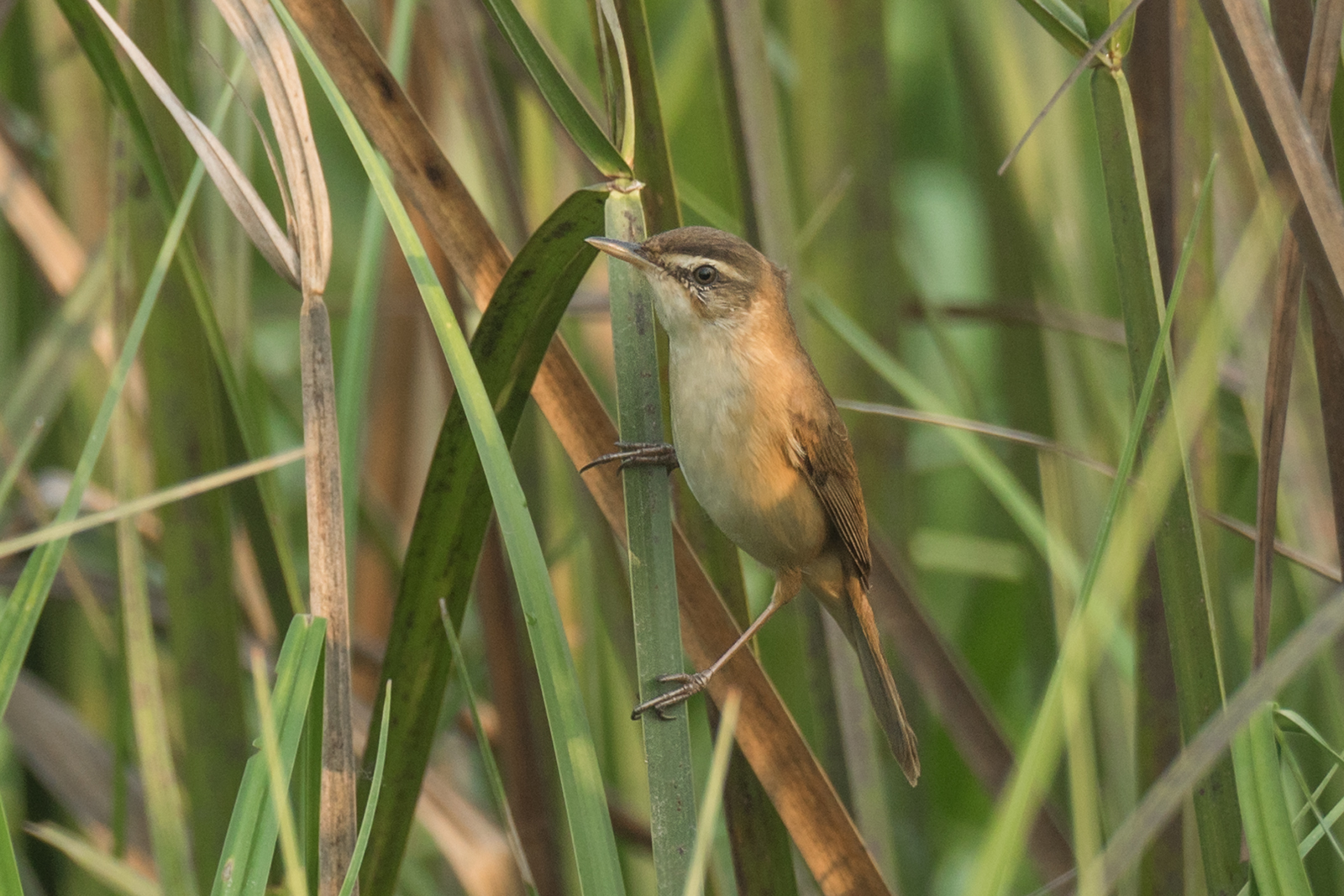
- In Thailand

Conservation status
- Vulnerable (IUCN 3.1)

Scientific classification
- Kingdom: Animalia
- Phylum: Chordata
- Class: Aves
- Order: Passeriformes
- Family: Acrocephalidae
- Genus: Acrocephalus
- Species: A. tangorum

Binomial name
- Acrocephalus tangorum La Touche, 1912
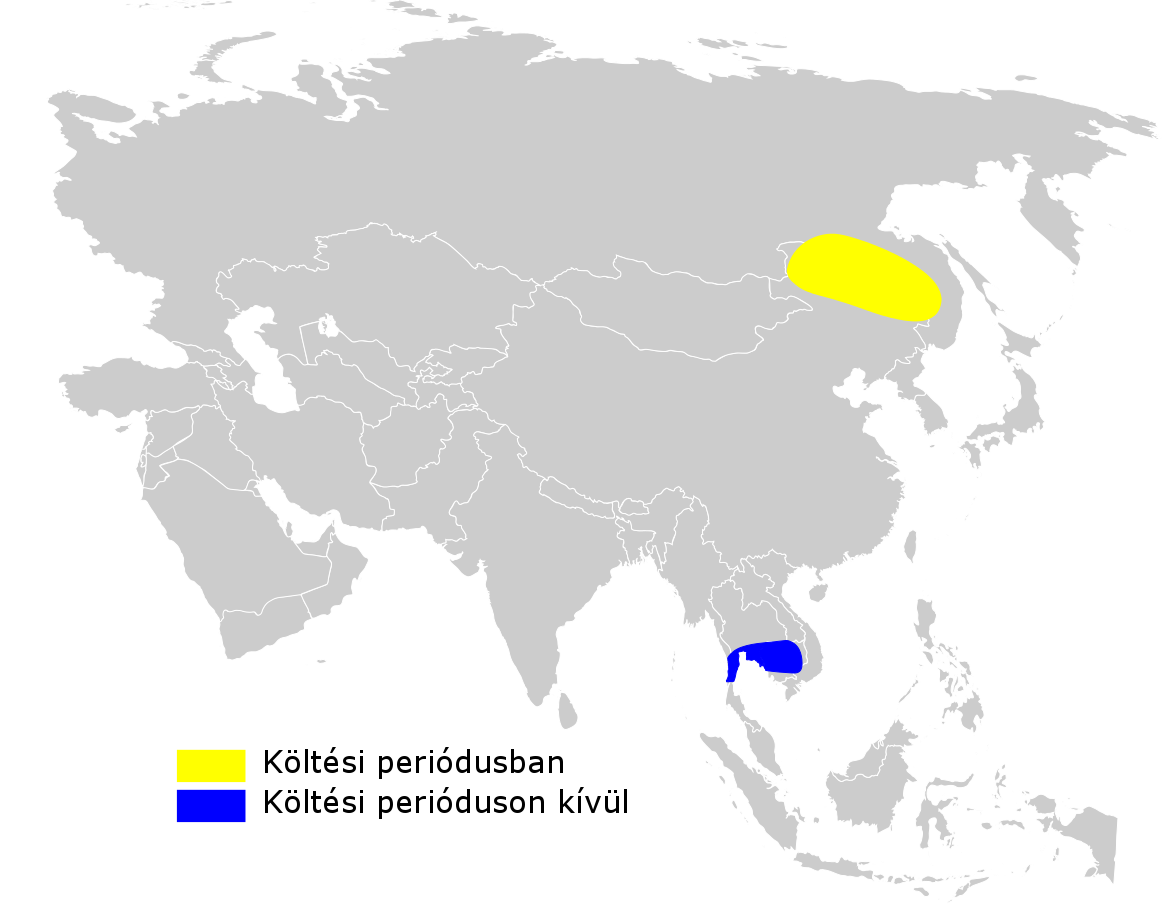
- Distribution of Manchurian reed warbler Breeding Non-breeding

Synonyms
- Acrocephalus agricola tangorum La Touche, 1912

= Manchurian reed warbler =

Species of bird

The Manchurian reed warbler (Acrocephalus tangorum), also known as the Manchurian reed-warbler, is a species of marsh-warbler (family Acrocephalidae). It was formerly included in the "Old World warbler" assemblage, and was usually (and sometimes is still) treated as a subspecies of the paddyfield warbler (A. agricola). It is found in Cambodia, China, Hong Kong, South Korea, Laos, Russia, Thailand, Vietnam, Malaysia and possibly Myanmar. Its natural habitat is swamps. It is threatened by habitat loss.
