= Emlen funnel =

Experimental device for studying bird migration

An Emlen funnel is a bird cage shaped like an inverted cone, used to study bird behaviour, in particular birds' migratory instincts. It is named after Stephen and John Emlen, who introduced the technique in 1966. An ink pad is placed on the bottom, so when the bird hops or flutters onto the sloping walls it leaves a track before slipping back down. The bird's view through the top of the cage can be manipulated to show how it responds to different apparent "star patterns" (actually generated in a planetarium).
