= Bird migration =

Seasonal movement of birds

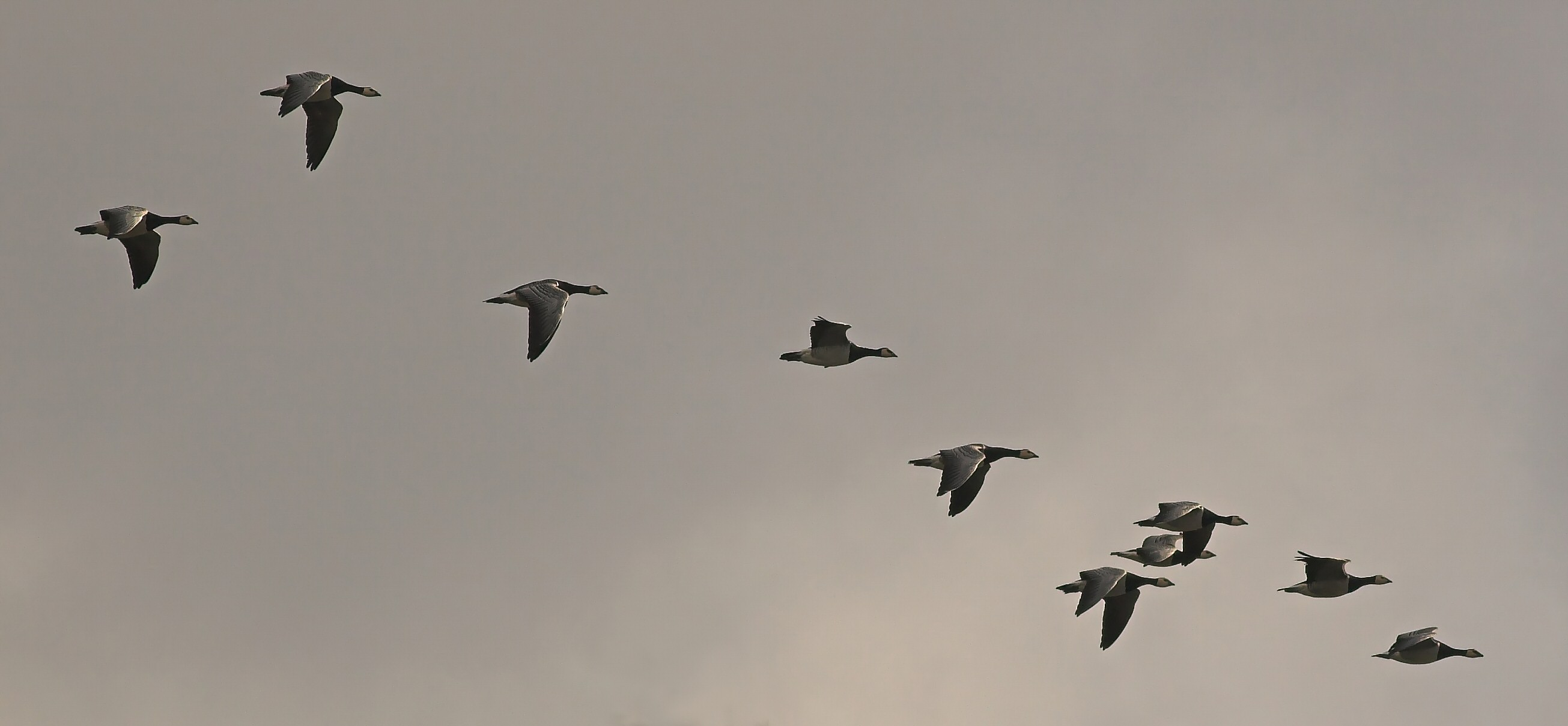
A flock of barnacle geese during autumn migration

Examples of long-distance bird migration routes

Bird migration is a seasonal movement of some birds between breeding and wintering grounds that occurs twice a year. It is typically between northern and southern regions. Migration carries inherent risks, including predation and other hazards en route.

The Arctic tern holds the long-distance migration record for birds, travelling between Arctic breeding grounds and the Antarctic each year. Some species of tubenoses, such as albatrosses, circle the Earth, flying over the southern oceans, while others such as Manx shearwaters migrate 14,000 km (8,700 mi) between their northern breeding grounds and the Southern Ocean. Shorter migrations are common, while longer ones are not. The shorter migrations include altitudinal migrations on mountains, including the Andes and Himalayas.

The timing of migration seems to be controlled primarily by changes in day length. Migrating birds navigate using celestial cues from the Sun and stars, the Earth's magnetic field, and mental maps.

== Historical views ==
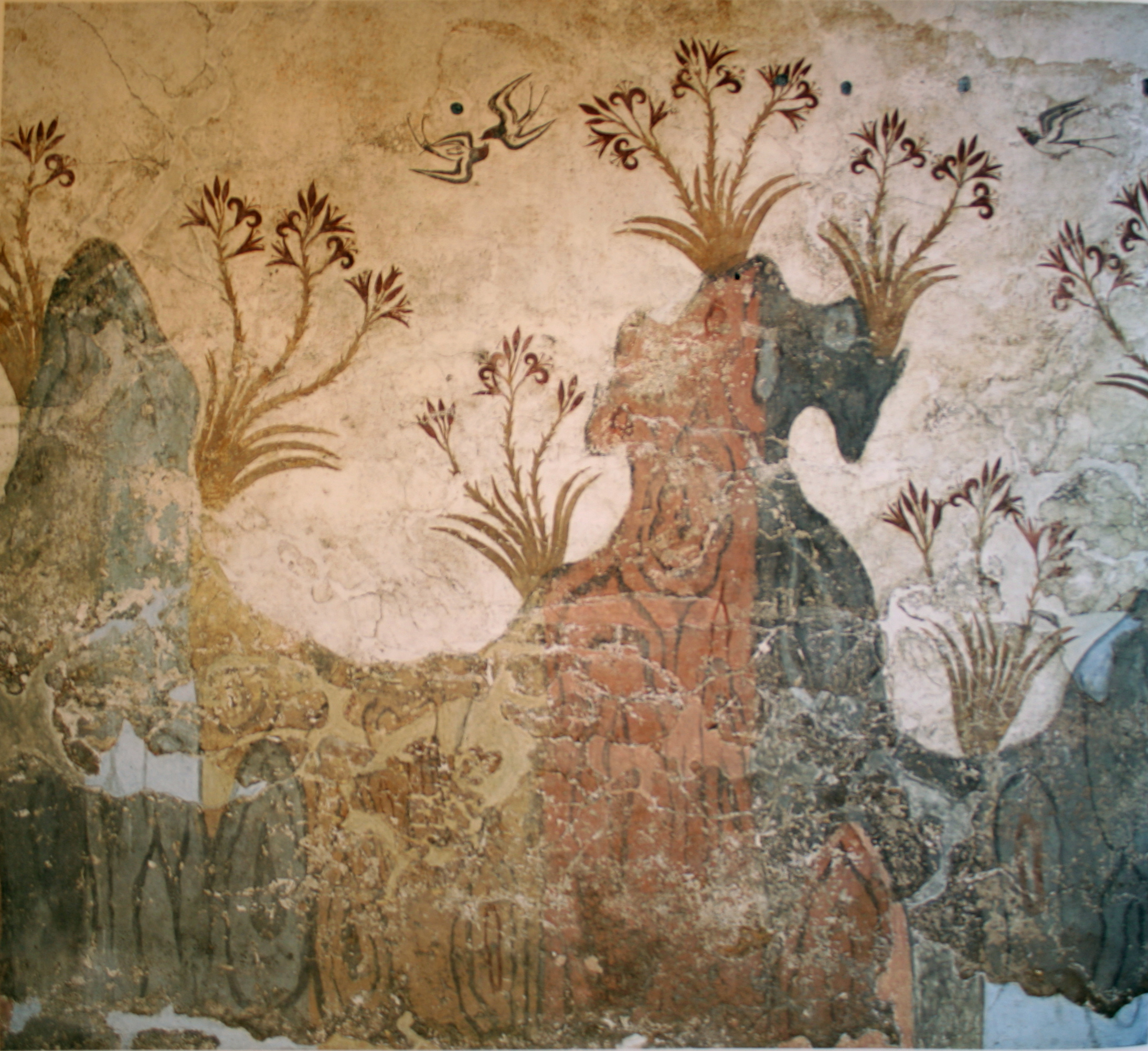
Minoan fresco of swallows in springtime at Akrotiri, c. 1500 BC

In the Pacific, traditional land-finding techniques used by Micronesians and Polynesians suggest that bird migration was observed and interpreted for more than 3,000 years. In Samoan tradition, for example, Tagaloa sent his daughter Sina to Earth in the form of a bird, Tuli, to find dry land, the word tuli referring specifically to land-finding waders, often to the Pacific golden plover.

Writings of ancient Greeks recognized the seasonal comings and goings of birds. Aristotle recorded that cranes travelled from the steppes of Scythia to marshes at the headwaters of the Nile, an observation repeated by Pliny the Elder in his Historia Naturalis. Aristotle, however, suggested that swallows and other birds hibernated. This belief persisted as late as 1878 when Elliott Coues listed the titles of no fewer than 182 papers dealing with the hibernation of swallows. Even the "highly observant" Gilbert White, in his posthumously published 1789 The Natural History of Selborne, quoted a man's story about swallows being found in a chalk cliff collapse "while he was a schoolboy at Brighthelmstone", though the man denied being an eyewitness. However, he writes that "as to swallows being found in a torpid state during the winter in the Isle of Wight or any part of this country, I never heard any such account worth attending to", and that if early swallows "happen to find frost and snow they immediately withdraw for a time—a circumstance this much more in favour of hiding than migration", since he doubts they would "return for a week or two to warmer latitudes". Only at the end of the eighteenth century was migration accepted as an explanation for the winter disappearance of birds from northern climes. Thomas Bewick's A History of British Birds (Volume 1, 1797) mentions a report from "a very intelligent master of a vessel" who, "between the islands of Menorca and Majorca, saw great numbers of Swallows flying northward", and states the situation in Britain as follows:

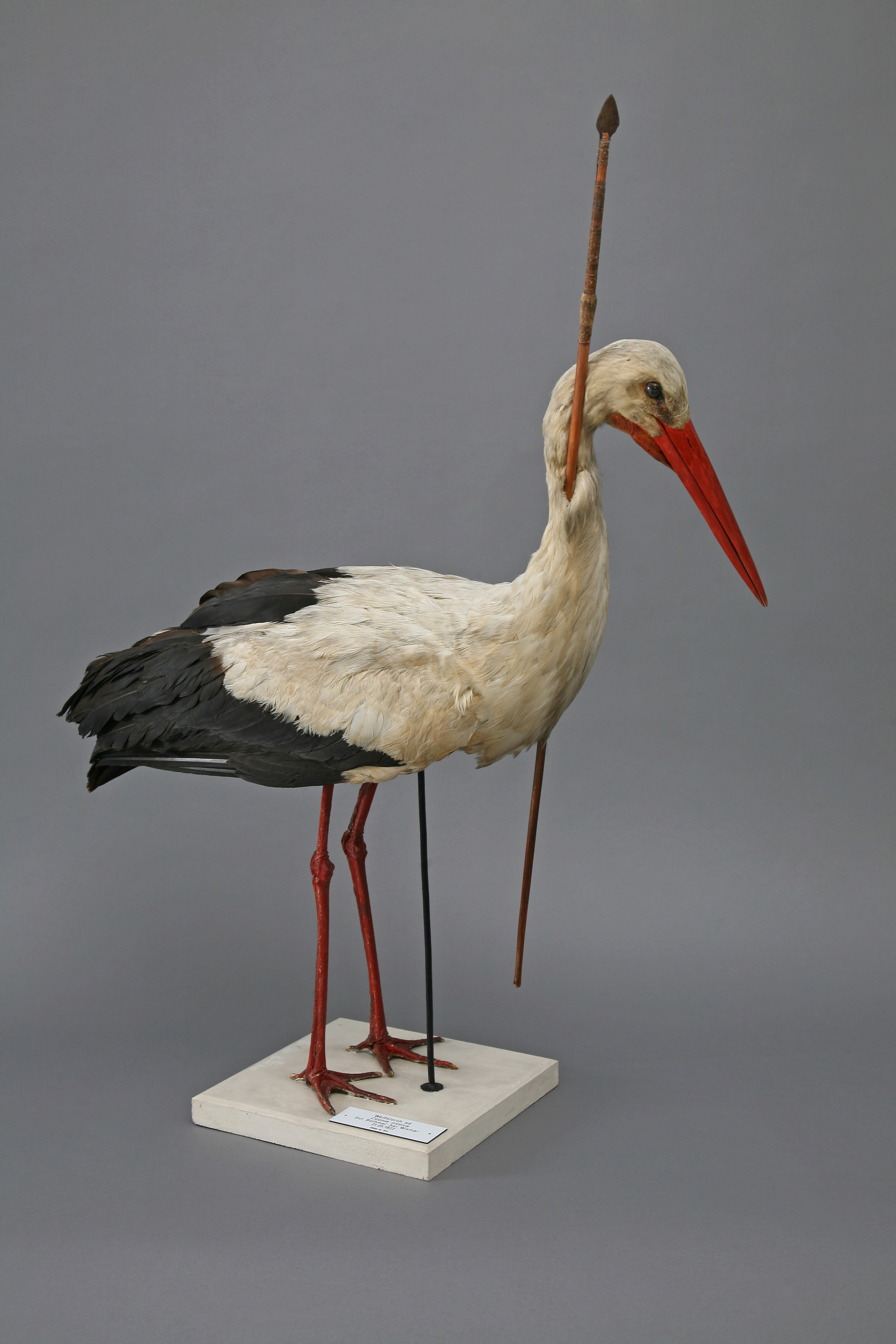
The Rostocker Pfeilstorch, found in 1822, demonstrated that birds migrated rather than hibernating or changing form in winter.

Swallows frequently roost at night, after they begin to congregate, by the sides of rivers and pools, from which circumstance it has been erroneously supposed that they retire into the water.

— Bewick

Bewick then describes an experiment that succeeded in keeping swallows alive in Britain for several years, where they remained warm and dry through the winters. He concludes:

These experiments have since been amply confirmed by ... M. Natterer, of Vienna ... and the result clearly proves, what is in fact now admitted on all hands, that Swallows do not in any material instance differ from other birds in their nature and propensities [for life in the air]; but that they leave us when this country can no longer furnish them with a supply of their proper and natural food ...

— Bewick

In 1822, a white stork was found in the German state of Mecklenburg with an arrow made from central African hardwood, which provided some of the earliest evidence of long-distance stork migration. This bird was called the Pfeilstorch, German for 'arrow stork'.

== General patterns ==
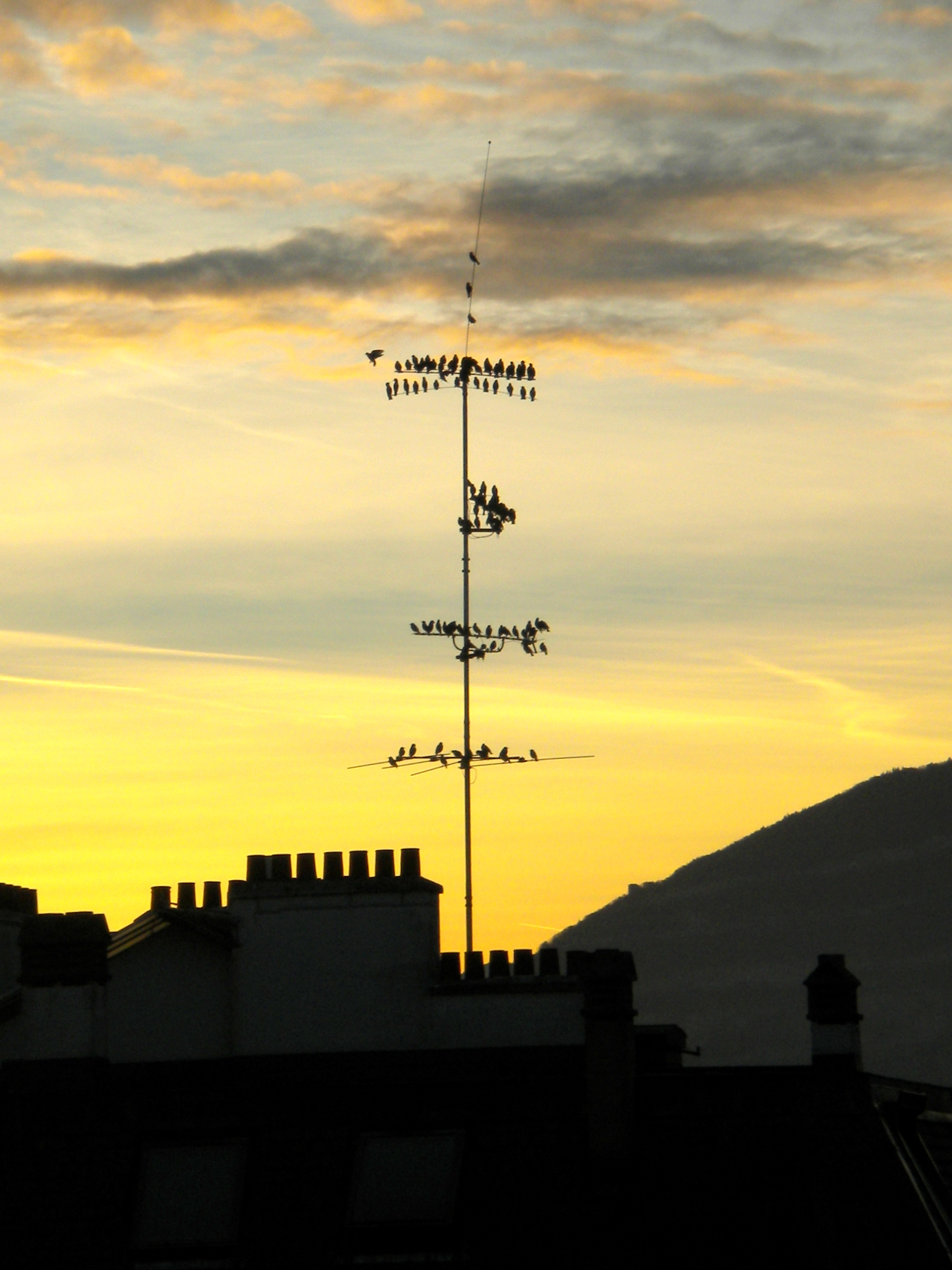
A flock of common starlings assembling in Geneva, Switzerland, before migrating southwards

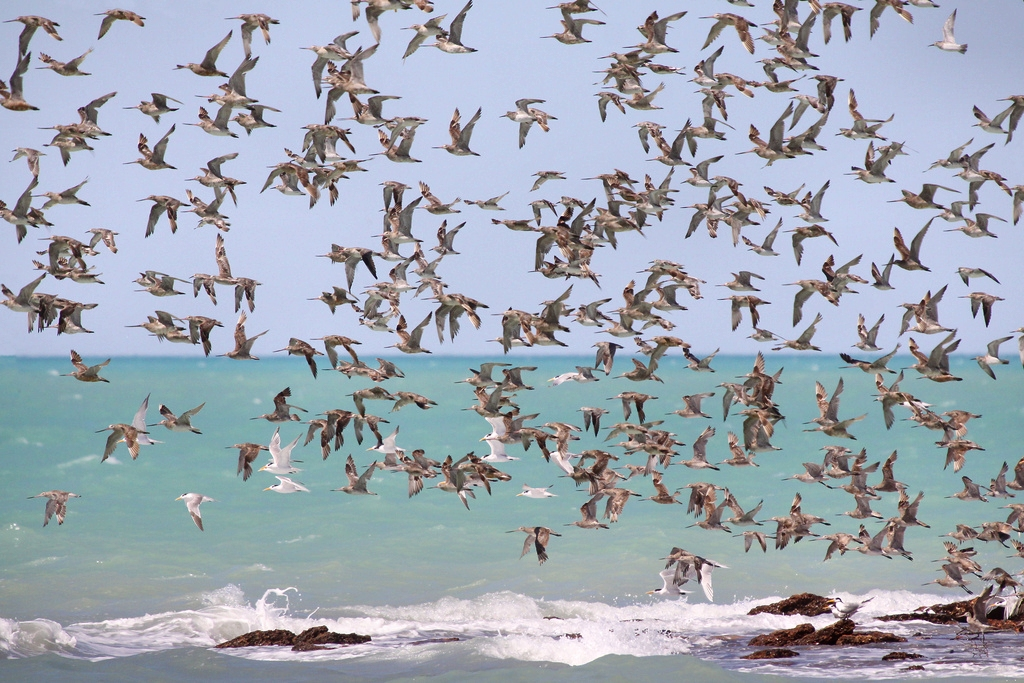
Migrating waders in Roebuck Bay, Western Australia

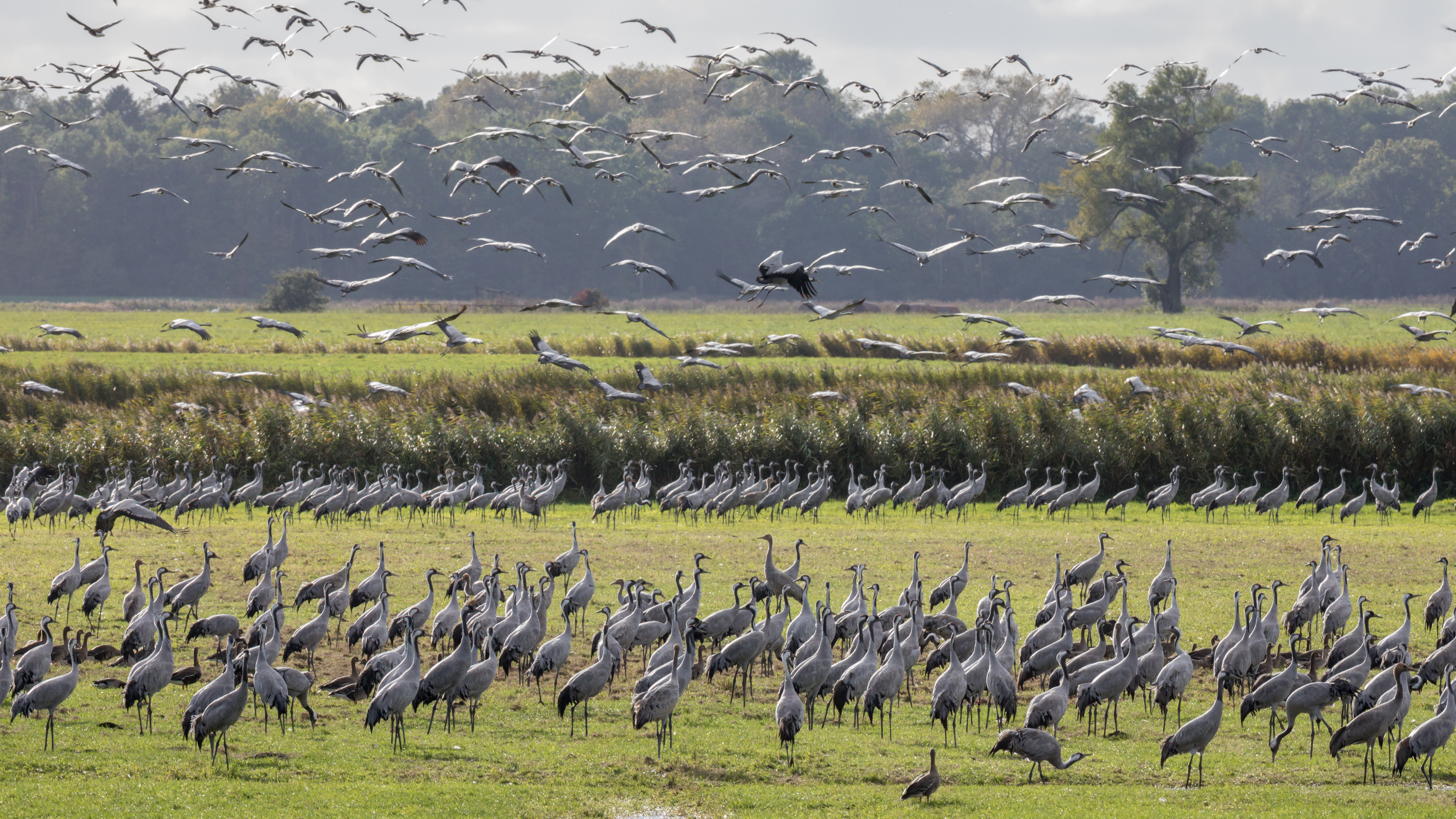
In the autumn, gigantic numbers of common cranes gather in the northern federal German states of Mecklenburg-Vorpommern and Brandenburg in order to rest and prepare themselves for the long journey south.

Migration is the regular seasonal movement, often north and south, undertaken by many species of birds. Migration is marked by its annual seasonality and movement between breeding and non-breeding areas. Nonmigratory bird movements include those made in response to environmental changes including in food availability, habitat, or weather. Sometimes, journeys are not termed "true migration" because they are irregular (nomadism, invasions, irruptions) or in only one direction (dispersal, movement of young away from natal area). Non-migratory birds are said to be resident or sedentary. Approximately 1,800 of the world's 10,000 bird species are long-distance migrants.

Many bird populations migrate long distances along a flyway. The most common pattern involves flying north in the spring to breed in the temperate or Arctic summer and returning in the autumn to wintering grounds in warmer regions to the south. In the southern hemisphere, the directions are reversed, but there is less land area in the far south to support long-distance migration.

The primary motivation for migration appears to be food; for example, some hummingbirds choose not to migrate if fed through the winter. In addition, the longer days of the northern summer provide extended time for breeding birds to feed their young. This helps diurnal birds to produce larger clutches than related non-migratory species that remain in the tropics. As the days shorten in autumn, the birds return to warmer regions where the available food supply varies little with the season.

These advantages offset the high stress, physical exertion costs, and other risks of migration. Predation can be heightened during migration: Eleonora's falcon Falco eleonorae, which breeds on Mediterranean islands, has a very late breeding season, coordinated with the autumn passage of southbound passerine migrants, which it feeds to its young. A similar strategy is adopted by the greater noctule bat, which preys on nocturnal passerine migrants. The higher concentrations of migrating birds at stopover sites make them prone to parasites and pathogens, which require a heightened immune response.

Within a species not all populations may be migratory; this is known as "partial migration". Partial migration is very common in the southern continents; in Australia, 44% of non-passerine birds and 32% of passerine species are partially migratory. In some species, the population at higher latitudes tends to be migratory and will often winter at lower latitude. The migrating birds bypass the latitudes where other populations may be sedentary, where suitable wintering habitats may already be occupied. This is an example of leap-frog migration. Many fully migratory species show leap-frog migration (birds that nest at higher latitudes spend the winter at lower latitudes), and many show the alternative, chain migration, where populations 'slide' more evenly north and south without reversing the order.

Within a population, it is common for different ages and/or sexes to have different patterns of timing and distance. Female chaffinches Fringilla coelebs in Eastern Fennoscandia migrate earlier in the autumn than males do and the European tits of genera Parus and Cyanistes only migrate in their first year.

Most migrations begin with the birds starting off in a broad front. Often, this front narrows into one or more preferred routes termed flyways. These routes typically follow mountain ranges or coastlines, sometimes rivers, and may take advantage of updrafts and other wind patterns or avoid geographical barriers such as large stretches of open water. The specific routes may be genetically programmed or learned to varying degrees. The routes taken on forward and return migration are often different.

Many, if not most, birds migrate in flocks. For larger birds, flying in flocks reduces the energy cost. Geese in a V formation may conserve 12–20% of the energy they would need to fly alone. Red knots Calidris canutus and dunlins Calidris alpina were found in radar studies to fly 5 km/h (2.5 kn) faster in flocks than when they were flying alone.

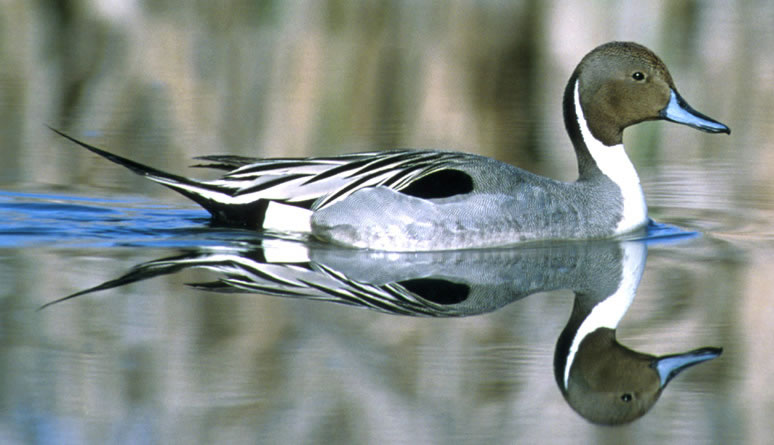
Northern pintail skeletons have been found high in the Himalayas

Birds fly at varying altitudes during migration. An expedition to Mt. Everest found skeletons of northern pintail Anas acuta and black-tailed godwit Limosa limosa at 5,000 m (16,000 ft) on the Khumbu Glacier. Bar-headed geese Anser indicus have been recorded by GPS flying at up to 6,540 m (21,460 ft) while crossing the Himalayas, at the same time engaging in the highest rates of climb to altitude for any bird. Anecdotal reports of them flying much higher have yet to be corroborated with any direct evidence. Seabirds fly low over water but gain altitude when crossing land, and the reverse pattern is seen in land birds. However most bird migration is in the range of 150 to 600 m (490–2,000 ft). Bird strike Aviation records from the United States show most collisions occur below 600 m (2,000 ft) and almost none above 1,800 m (5,900 ft).

Bird migration is not limited to birds that can fly. Most species of penguin (Spheniscidae) migrate by swimming. These routes can cover over 1,000 km (550 nmi). Dusky grouse Dendragapus obscurus perform altitudinal migration mostly by walking. Emus Dromaius novaehollandiae in Australia have been observed to undertake long-distance movements on foot during droughts.

== Nocturnal migratory behaviour ==
During nocturnal migration ("nocmig"), many birds give nocturnal flight calls, which are short, contact-type calls. These likely serve to maintain the composition of a migrating flock, and can sometimes encode the sex of a migrating individual, and to avoid collision in the air. Nocturnal migration can be monitored using weather radar data, allowing ornithologists to estimate the number of birds migrating on a given night, and the direction of the migration. Future research includes the automatic detection and identification of nocturnally calling migrant birds.

Nocturnal migrants land in the morning and may feed for a few days before resuming their migration. These birds are referred to as passage migrants in the regions where they occur for a short period between the origin and destination.

Nocturnal migrants minimize depredation, avoid overheating and can feed during the day. One cost of nocturnal migration is the loss of sleep. Migrants may be able to alter their quality of sleep to compensate for the loss.

== Long-distance migration ==
The typical image of migration is of northern land birds, such as swallows (Hirundinidae) and birds of prey, making long flights to the tropics. However, many Holarctic wildfowl and finch (Fringillidae) species winters in the North Temperate Zone, in regions with milder winters than their summer breeding grounds. For example, the pink-footed goose migrates from Iceland to Britain and neighbouring countries, whilst the dark-eyed junco migrates from subarctic and arctic climates to the contiguous United States and the American goldfinch from taiga to wintering grounds extending from the American South northwestward to Western Oregon.

Migration routes and wintering grounds are both genetically and traditionally determined depending on the social system of the species. In long-lived, social species such as white storks (Ciconia ciconia), flocks are often led by the oldest members and young storks learn the route on their first journey. In short-lived species that migrate alone, such as the Eurasian blackcap Sylvia atricapilla or the yellow-billed cuckoo Coccyzus americanus, first-year migrants follow a genetically determined route that is alterable with selective breeding.

Many migration routes of long-distance migratory birds are circuitous due to evolutionary history: the breeding range of Northern wheatears Oenanthe oenanthe has expanded to cover the entire Northern Hemisphere, but the species still migrates up to 14,500 km to reach ancestral wintering grounds in sub-Saharan Africa rather than establish new wintering grounds closer to breeding areas.

A migration route often does not follow the most direct line between breeding and wintering grounds. Rather, it could follow a hooked or arched line, with detours around geographical barriers or towards suitable stopover habitat. For most land birds, such barriers could consist of large water bodies or high mountain ranges, a lack of stopover or feeding sites, or a lack of thermal columns (important for broad-winged birds). Conversely, in water-birds, large areas of land without wetlands offering suitable feeding sites may present a barrier, and detours avoiding such barriers are observed. For example, brent geese Branta bernicla bernicla migrating between the Taymyr Peninsula and the Wadden Sea travel via low-lying coastal feeding-areas on the White Sea and the Baltic Sea rather than directly across the Arctic Ocean and the Scandinavian mainland.

Great snipes make non-stop flights of 4,000–7,000 km, lasting 60–90 h, during which they change their average cruising heights from 2,000 m (above sea level) at night to around 4,000 m during daytime.

=== In waders ===
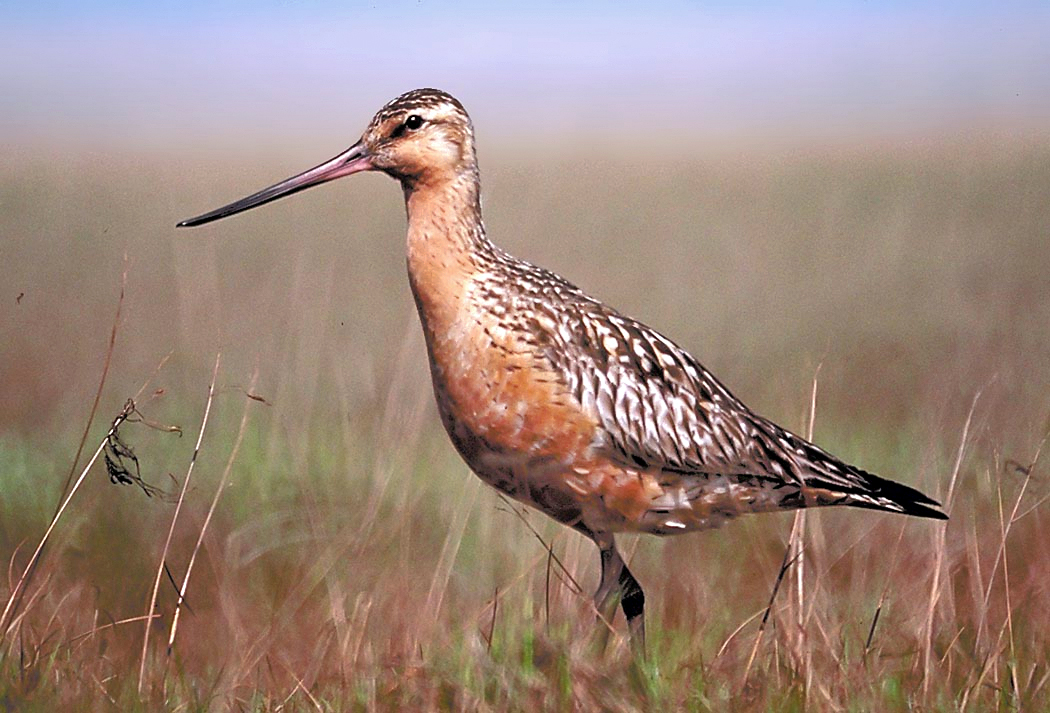
Bar-tailed godwit

A similar situation occurs with waders (called shorebirds in North America). Many species, such as dunlin Calidris alpina and western sandpiper Calidris mauri, undertake long movements from their Arctic breeding grounds to warmer locations in the same hemisphere, but others such as semipalmated sandpiper C. pusilla travel longer distances to the tropics in the Southern Hemisphere.

For some species of waders, migration success depends on the availability of certain key food resources at stopover points along the migration route. This gives the migrants an opportunity to refuel for the next leg of the voyage. Some examples of important stopover locations are the Bay of Fundy and Delaware Bay.

Some bar-tailed godwits Limosa lapponica baueri have the longest known non-stop flight of any migrant, flying 11,000 km from Alaska to their New Zealand non-breeding areas. Prior to migration, 55 percent of their bodyweight is stored as fat to fuel this uninterrupted journey.

=== In seabirds ===
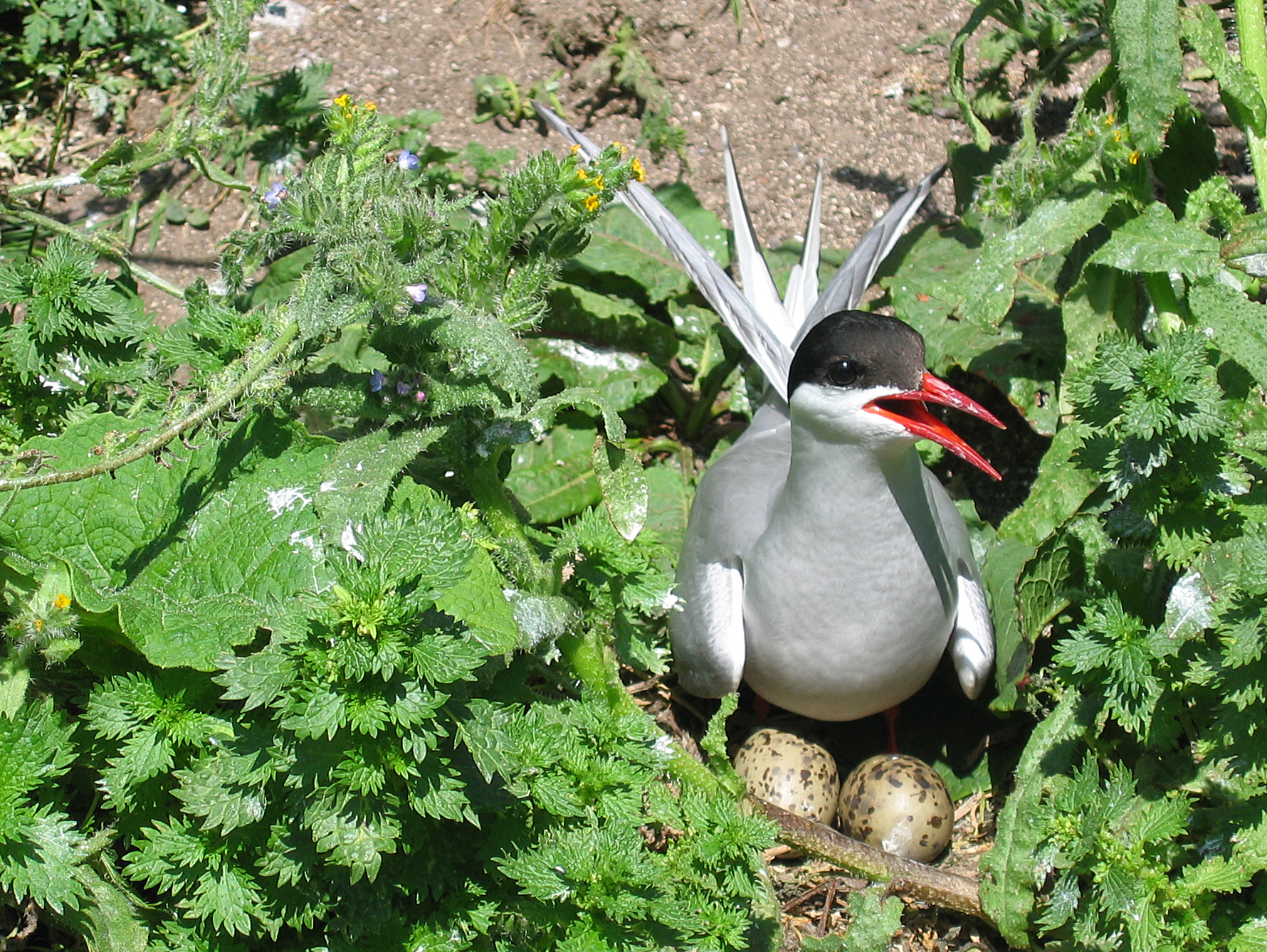
The Arctic tern migrates the greatest distance of any bird.

Seabird migration is similar in pattern to those of the waders and waterfowl. Some, such as the black guillemot Cepphus grylle and some gulls, are quite sedentary; others, such as most terns and auks breeding in the temperate northern hemisphere, move varying distances south in the northern winter. The Arctic tern Sterna paradisaea has the longest-distance migration of any bird, and sees more daylight than any other, moving from its Arctic breeding grounds to the Antarctic non-breeding areas. One Arctic tern, ringed (banded) as a chick on the Farne Islands in Northumberland off the British east coast, reached Melbourne, Australia in just three months from fledging, a sea journey of over 22,000 km (12,000 nmi), while another also from the Farne Islands with a light level geolocator tag 'G82' covered a staggering 96,000 km (52,000 nmi) in just 10 months from the end of one breeding season to the start of the next, travelling not just the length of the Atlantic Ocean and the width of the Indian Ocean, but also halfway across the South Pacific to the boundary between the Ross and Amundsen Seas before returning west along the Antarctic coast and back up the Atlantic. Many tubenosed birds breed in the southern hemisphere and migrate north in the southern winter.

The most pelagic species, mainly in the 'tubenose' order Procellariiformes, are great wanderers, and the albatrosses of the southern oceans may circle the globe as they ride the "Roaring Forties" outside the breeding season. The tubenoses spread widely over large areas of open ocean, but congregate when food becomes available. Many are among the longest-distance migrants; sooty shearwaters Puffinus griseus nesting on the Falkland Islands migrate 14,000 km (7,600 nmi) between the breeding colony and the North Atlantic Ocean off Norway. Some Manx shearwaters Puffinus puffinus do this same journey in reverse. As they are long-lived birds, they may cover enormous distances during their lives; one record-breaking Manx shearwater is calculated to have flown 8 million kilometres (4.5 million nautical miles) during its over-50-year lifespan.

=== Diurnal migration in large birds using thermals ===
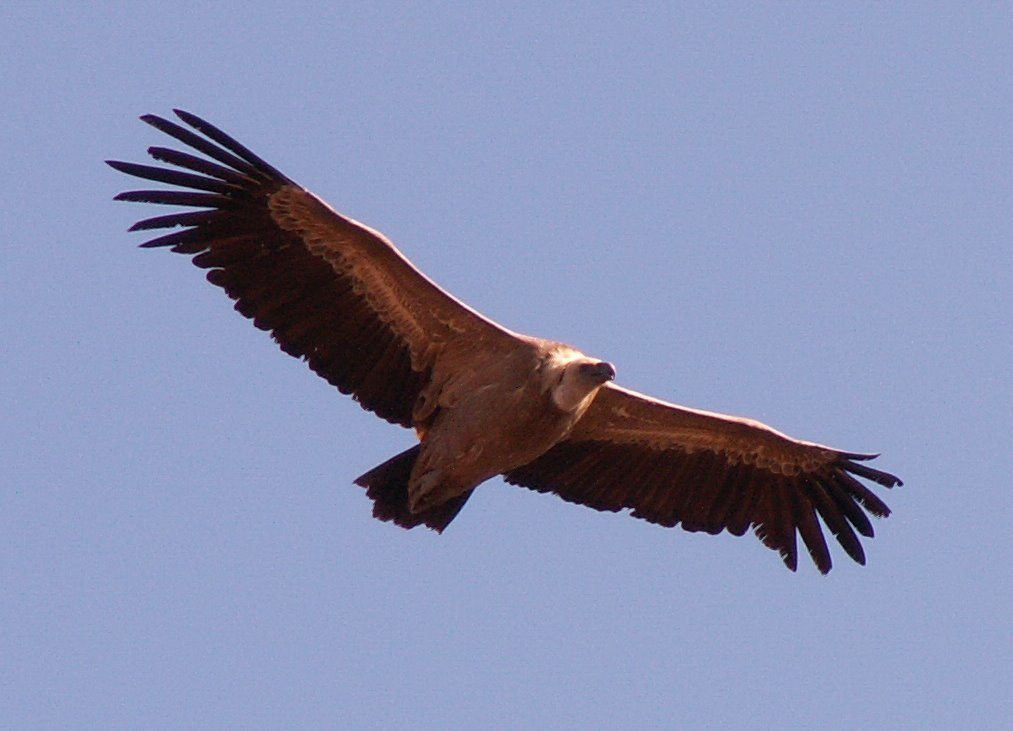
Griffon vulture soaring

Some large broad-winged birds rely on thermal columns of rising hot air to enable them to soar. These include many birds of prey such as vultures, eagles, and buzzards, but also storks. These birds migrate in the daytime. Migratory species in these groups have great difficulty crossing large bodies of water, since thermals only form over land, and these birds cannot maintain active flight for long distances. Mediterranean and other seas present a major obstacle to soaring birds, which must cross at the narrowest points. Massive numbers of large raptors and storks pass through areas such as the Strait of Messina, Gibraltar, Falsterbo, and the Bosphorus at migration times. More common species, such as the European honey buzzard Pernis apivorus, can be counted in hundreds of thousands in autumn. Other barriers, such as mountain ranges, can cause funnelling, particularly of large diurnal migrants, as in the Central American migratory bottleneck. The Batumi bottleneck in the Caucasus is one of the heaviest migratory funnels on earth, created when hundreds of thousands of soaring birds avoid flying over the Black Sea surface and across high mountains. Birds of prey such as honey buzzards which migrate using thermals lose only 10 to 20% of their weight during migration, which may explain why they forage less during migration than do smaller birds of prey with more active flight such as falcons, hawks and harriers.

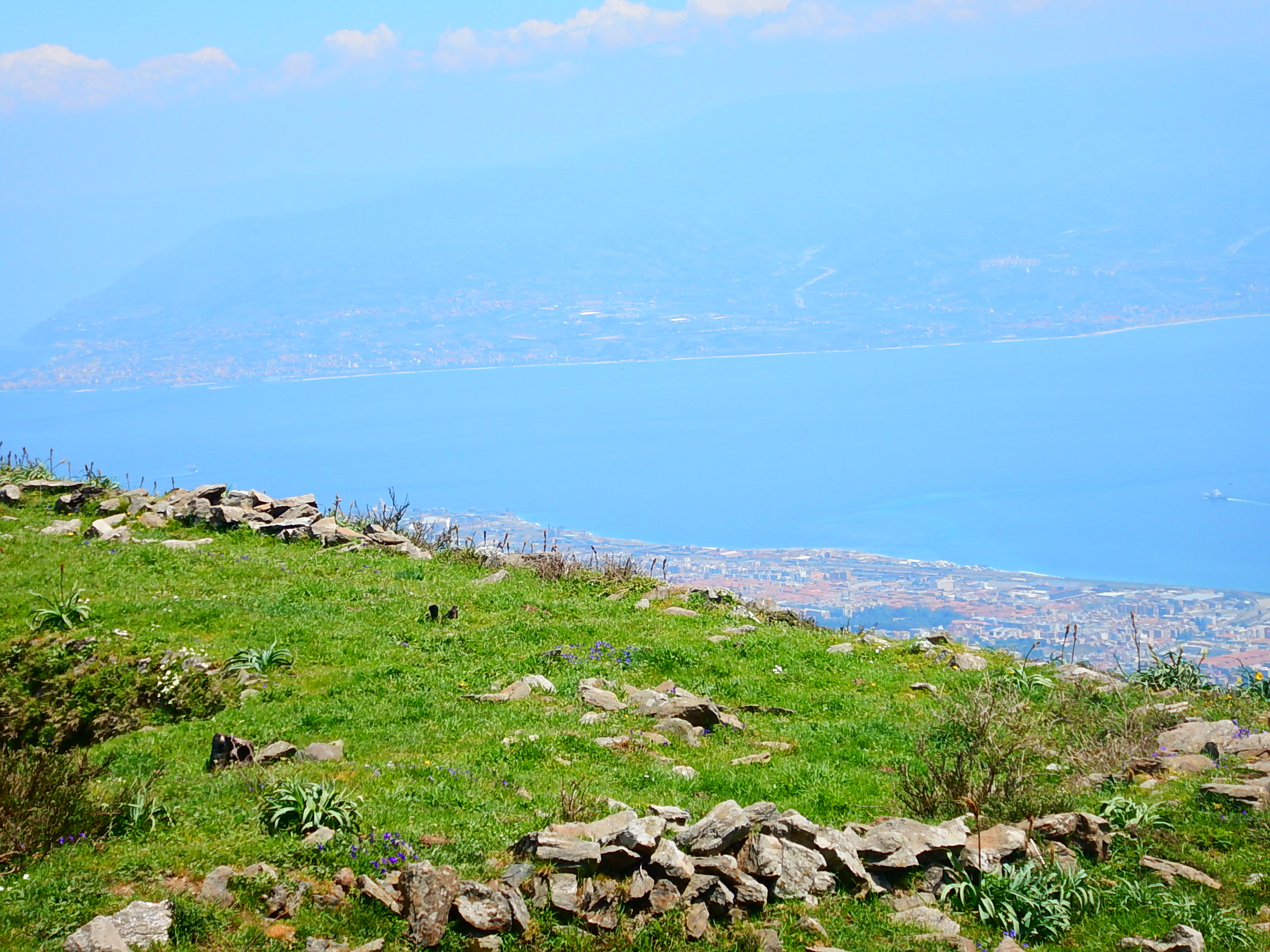
The bottleneck of the Strait of Messina, point of transit of the migrations, seen from the Peloritani mountains, Sicily

From observing the migration of eleven soaring bird species over the Strait of Gibraltar, species which did not advance their autumn migration dates were those with declining breeding populations in Europe.

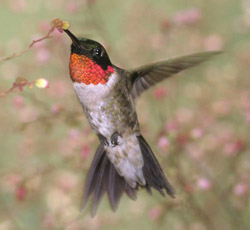
Ruby-throated hummingbird

== Short-distance and altitudinal migration ==
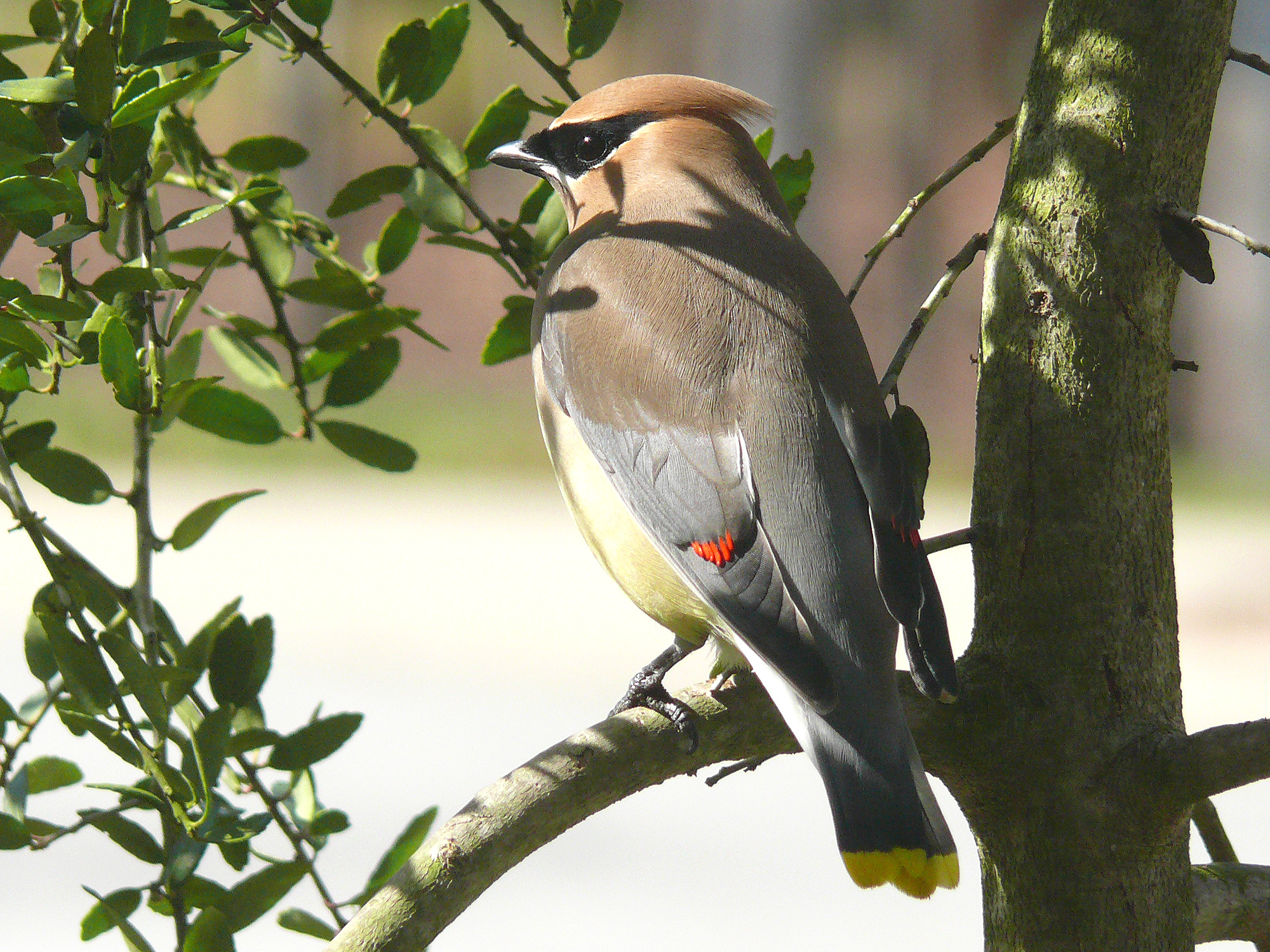
Cedar waxwing

Many long-distance migrants appear to be genetically programmed to respond to changing day length. Species that move short distances, however, may not need such a timing mechanism, instead moving in response to local weather conditions. Thus mountain and moorland breeders, such as wallcreeper Tichodroma muraria and white-throated dipper Cinclus cinclus, may move only altitudinally to escape the cold higher ground. Other species such as merlin Falco columbarius and Eurasian skylark Alauda arvensis move further, to the coast or towards the south. Species like the chaffinch are much less migratory in Britain than those of continental Europe, mostly not moving more than 5 km in their lives.

Short-distance passerine migrants have two evolutionary origins. Those that have long-distance migrants in the same family, such as the common chiffchaff Phylloscopus collybita, are species of southern hemisphere origins that have progressively shortened their return migration to stay in the northern hemisphere.

Species that have no long-distance migratory relatives, such as the waxwings Bombycilla, are effectively moving in response to winter weather and the loss of their usual winter food, rather than enhanced breeding opportunities.

In the tropics there is little variation in the length of day throughout the year, and it is always warm enough for a food supply, but altitudinal migration occurs in some tropical birds. There is evidence that this enables the migrants to obtain more of their preferred foods such as fruits.

Altitudinal migration is common on mountains worldwide, such as in the Himalayas and the Andes. Dusky grouse in Colorado migrate less than a kilometer away from their summer grounds to winter sites which may be higher or lower by about 400 m in altitude than the summer sites.

Many bird species in arid regions across southern Australia are nomadic; they follow water and food supply around the country in an irregular pattern, unrelated to season but related to rainfall. Several years may pass between visits to an area by a particular species.

== Irruptions and dispersal ==
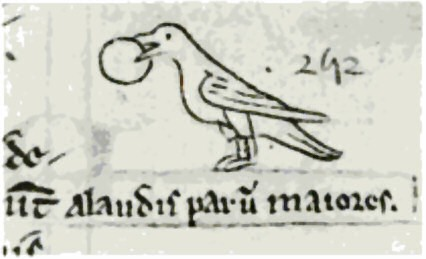
Mediaeval sketch by Matthew Paris in his Chronica Majora (1251) recording that year's major irruption of red crossbills into England

Sometimes circumstances such as a good breeding season followed by a food source failure the following year lead to irruptions in which large numbers of a species move far beyond the normal range. Bohemian waxwings Bombycilla garrulus well show this unpredictable variation in annual numbers, with five major arrivals in Britain during the nineteenth century, but 18 between the years 1937 and 2000. Red crossbills Loxia curvirostra too are irruptive, with widespread invasions across England noted in 1251, 1593, 1757, and 1791.

Bird migration is primarily, but not entirely, a Northern Hemisphere phenomenon. This is because continental landmasses of the northern hemisphere are almost entirely temperate and subject to winter food shortages driving bird populations south (including the Southern Hemisphere) to overwinter; In contrast, among (pelagic) seabirds, species of the Southern Hemisphere are more likely to migrate. This is because there is a large area of ocean in the Southern Hemisphere, and more islands suitable for seabirds to nest.

== Physiology and control ==
The control of migration, its timing and response are genetically controlled and appear to be a primitive trait that is present even in non-migratory species of birds. The ability to navigate and orient themselves during migration is a much more complex phenomenon that may include both endogenous programs as well as learning.

=== Timing ===
The primary physiological cue for migration is the changes in the day length. These changes are related to hormonal changes in the birds. In the period before migration, many birds display higher activity or Zugunruhe (German: migratory restlessness), first described by Johann Friedrich Naumann in 1795, as well as physiological changes such as increased fat deposition. The occurrence of Zugunruhe even in cage-raised birds with no environmental cues (e.g. shortening of day and falling temperature) has pointed to the role of circannual endogenous programs in controlling bird migrations. Caged birds display a preferential flight direction that corresponds with the migratory direction they would take in nature, changing their preferential direction at roughly the same time their wild conspecifics change course.

Satellite tracking of 48 individual Asian houbaras (Chlamydotis macqueenii) across multiple migrations showed that this species uses the local temperature to time their spring migration departure. Notably, departure responses to temperature varied between individuals but were individually repeatable (when tracked over multiple years). This suggests that individual use of temperature is a cue that allows for population-level adaptation to climate change. In other words, in a warming world, many migratory birds are predicted to depart earlier in the year for their summer or winter destination.

In polygynous species with considerable sexual dimorphism, males tend to return earlier to the breeding sites than their females. This is termed protandry.

=== Orientation and navigation ===
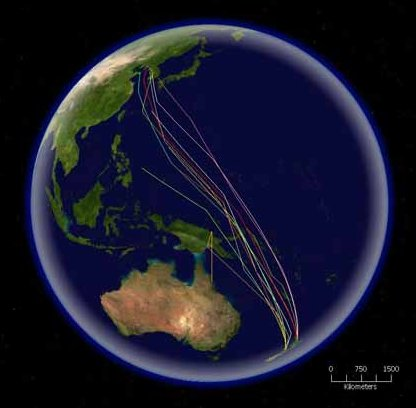
The routes of satellite tagged bar-tailed godwits migrating north from New Zealand. This species has the longest known non-stop migration of any species, up to 10,200 km (5,500 nmi).

Navigation is based on a variety of senses. Many birds have been shown to use a sun compass. Using the Sun for direction involves the need for making compensation based on the time. Navigation has been shown to be based on a combination of other abilities including the ability to detect magnetic fields (magnetoreception), use visual landmarks as well as olfactory cues.

Long-distance migrants are believed to disperse as young birds and form attachments to potential breeding sites and to favourite wintering sites. Once the site attachment is made they show high site-fidelity, visiting the same wintering sites year after year.

The ability of birds to navigate during migrations cannot be fully explained by endogenous programming, even with the help of responses to environmental cues. The ability to successfully perform long-distance migrations can probably only be fully explained with an accounting for the cognitive ability of the birds to recognize habitats and form mental maps. Satellite tracking of day migrating raptors such as ospreys and honey buzzards has shown that older individuals are better at making corrections for wind drift. Birds rely for navigation on a combination of innate biological senses and experience, as with the two electromagnetic tools that they use. A young bird on its first migration flies in the correct direction according to the Earth's magnetic field, but does not know how far the journey will be. It does this through a radical pair mechanism whereby chemical reactions in special photo pigments sensitive to short wavelengths are affected by the field. Although this only works during daylight hours, it does not use the position of the Sun in any way. With experience, it learns various landmarks and this "mapping" is done by magnetites in the trigeminal system, which tell the bird how strong the field is. Because birds migrate between northern and southern regions, the magnetic field strengths at different latitudes let it interpret the radical pair mechanism more accurately and let it know when it has reached its destination. There is a neural connection between the eye and "Cluster N", the part of the forebrain that is active during migrational orientation, suggesting that birds may actually be able to see the magnetic field of the Earth. Some migratory birds appear to use specific properties of Earth's magnetic field not just to find direction, but also to judge their location, including how far east or west they are.

=== Vagrancy ===
Migrating birds can lose their way and appear outside their normal ranges. This can be due to flying past their destinations as in the "spring overshoot" in which birds returning to their breeding areas overshoot and end up further north than intended.

Reverse migration, where the genetic programming of young birds fails to work properly, can lead to rarities turning up as vagrants thousands of kilometres out of range. Drift migration of birds blown off course by the wind can result in "falls" of large numbers of migrants at coastal sites. A related phenomenon called "abmigration" involves birds from one region joining similar birds from a different breeding region in the common winter grounds and then migrating back along with the new population. This is especially common in waterfowl, which shift from one flyway to another.

=== Migration conditioning ===
It has been possible to teach a migration route to a flock of birds, for example in re-introduction schemes. After a trial with Canada geese Branta canadensis, microlight aircraft were used in the US to teach safe migration routes to reintroduced whooping cranes Grus americana.

== Adaptations ==
Birds need to alter their metabolism to meet the demands of migration. The storage of energy through the accumulation of fat and the control of sleep in nocturnal migrants require special physiological adaptations. In addition, the feathers of a bird suffer from wear-and-tear and must be moulted. The timing of this moult – usually once a year but sometimes twice – varies with some species moulting prior to moving to their winter grounds and others molting prior to returning to their breeding grounds. Apart from physiological adaptations, migration sometimes requires behavioural changes such as flying in flocks to reduce the energy used in migration or the risk of predation.

== Global population trends ==
According to a 2026 comprehensive global assessment of over 3,380 species published in Nature Reviews Biodiversity, 51% of Earth's migratory bird species are currently in decline. Migrating avian populations face an intersecting array of severe human-caused perils across their flyways, including cross-continental habitat loss, toxic pesticide exposure, urban building collisions, and illegal poaching. Conservation data shows that standard localized protections—which isolated actions to single breeding grounds or specific wetlands—frequently fail because they do not protect the species across their full annual migration cycles. Modern tracking technology, smaller than a penny, has allowed scientists to target precise high-risk flyway zones, but international enforcement remains structurally restricted; major wealthy nations, including the United States, Canada, Mexico, Russia, and Japan, have failed to sign the global Convention on the Conservation of Migratory Species of Wild Animals.

== Evolutionary and ecological factors ==
Migration in birds is highly labile and is believed to have developed independently in many avian lineages. While it is agreed that the behavioural and physiological adaptations necessary for migration are under genetic control, some authors have argued that no genetic change is necessary for migratory behaviour to develop in a sedentary species because the genetic framework for migratory behaviour exists in nearly all avian lineages. This explains the rapid appearance of migratory behaviour after the most recent glacial maximum.

Theoretical analyses show that detours that increase flight distance by up to 20% will often be adaptive on aerodynamic grounds – a bird that loads itself with food to cross a long barrier flies less efficiently. However some species show circuitous migratory routes that reflect historical range expansions and are far from optimal in ecological terms. An example is the migration of continental populations of Swainson's thrush Catharus ustulatus, which fly far east across North America before turning south via Florida to reach northern South America; this route is believed to be the consequence of a range expansion that occurred about 10,000 years ago. Detours may also be caused by differential wind conditions, predation risk, or other factors.

=== Climate change ===
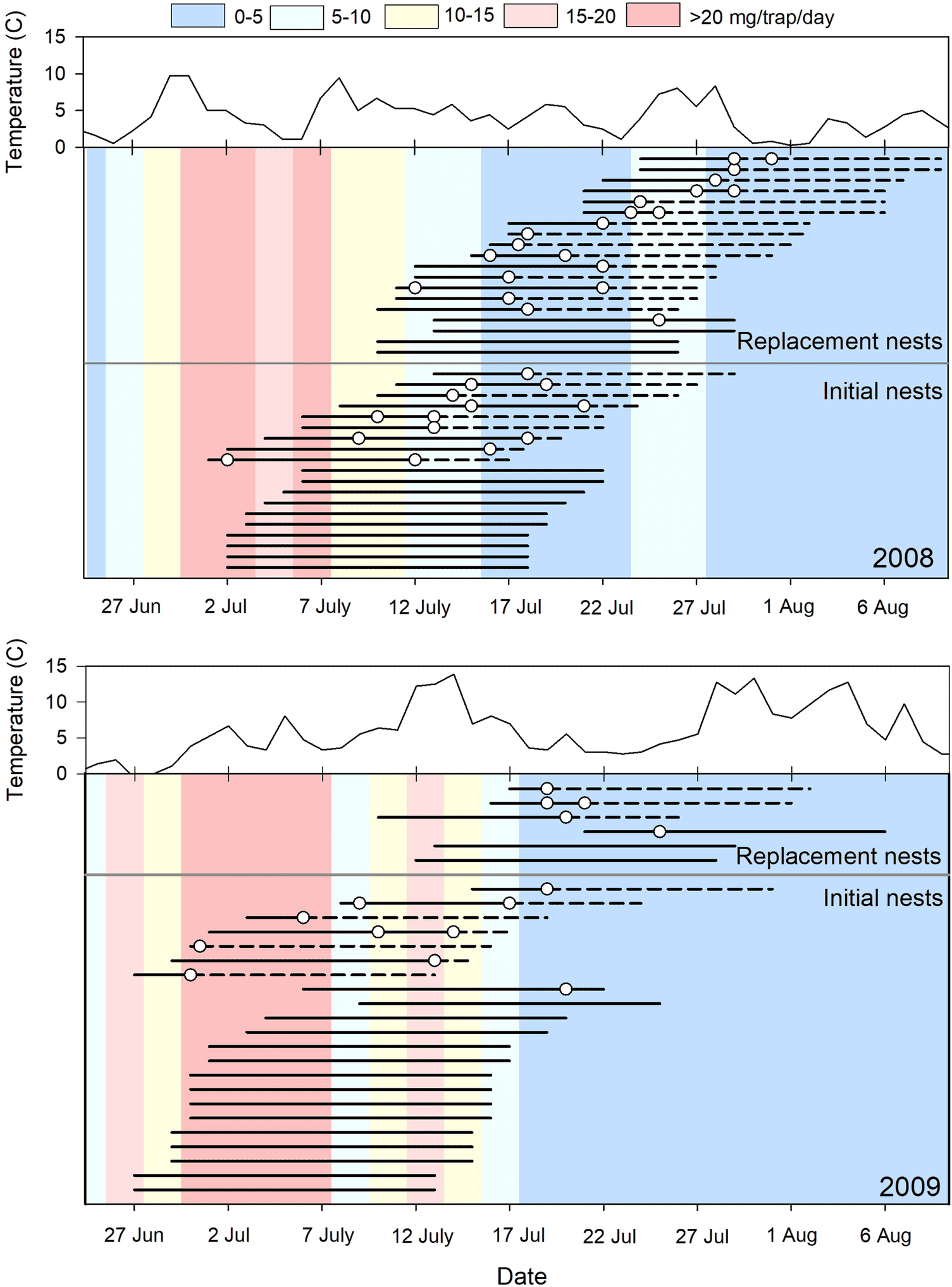
Differences in an Arctic shorebird species' phenology between a normal year and a hotter year.

Large scale climatic changes are expected to have an effect on the timing of migration. Studies have shown a variety of effects including timing changes in migration, breeding as well as population declines.

Bird migration is generally synchronised to take advantage of seasonal resources. For example, there is a strong link between seasonal migration and vegetation greenness in North America. Climate-induced shifts in the phenology of seasonal resource availability can cause mismatches between the timing of increased resource availability and important life-history events such as migration and breeding (aka phenological mismatch or phenological asynchrony). These mismatches between the timing of resource availability and when organisms need additional resources may impact species' fitness, as described by the match-mismatch hypothesis.

In birds, individuals may use local temperature as a cue for migration. Changing temperature patterns due to climate change can result in population-level shifts in migration phenology. Such shifts in the timing of migration of hundreds of species are already detectable at the continental scale. While phenological mismatches appear to be more pronounced in long-distance migrants, certain species traits such as a generalist diet may help some species avoid more severe consequences of mismatches.

== Ecological effects ==
The migration of birds aids the movement of other species, including those of ectoparasites such as ticks and lice, which in turn may carry micro-organisms including those of concern to human health. Due to the global spread of avian influenza, bird migration has been studied as a possible mechanism of disease transmission, but it has been found not to present a special risk; import of pet and domestic birds is a greater threat. Some viruses that are maintained in birds without lethal effects, such as the West Nile virus may be spread by migrating birds. Birds may also have a role in the dispersal of propagules of plants and plankton.

Some predators take advantage of the concentration of birds during migration. Greater noctule bats feed on nocturnal migrating passerines. Some birds of prey specialize on migrating waders.

== Study techniques ==
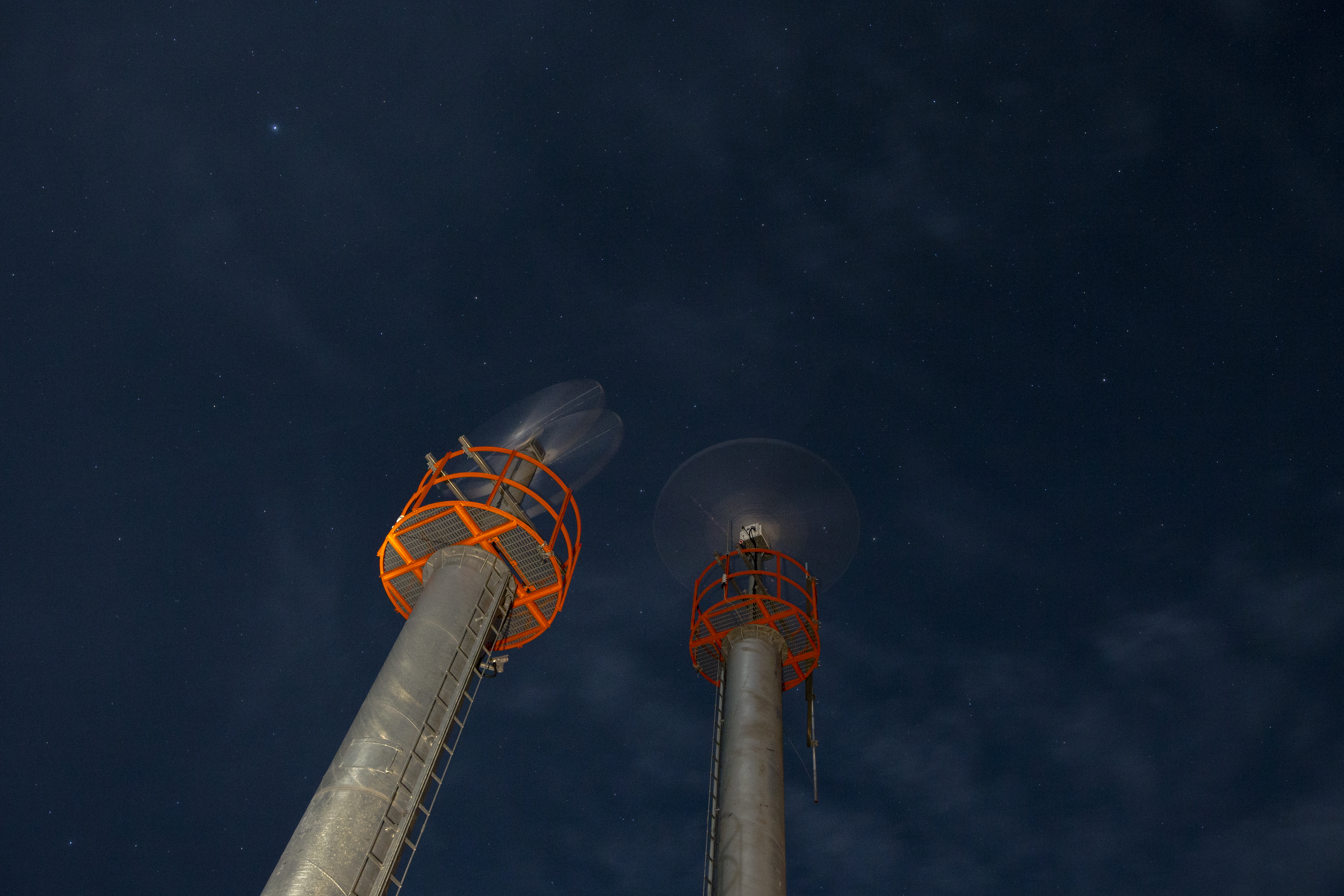
Radars for monitoring bird migration. Kihnu, Estonia.

Early studies on the timing of migration began in 1749 in Finland, with Johannes Leche of Turku collecting the dates of arrivals of spring migrants.

Bird migration routes have been studied by a variety of techniques including the oldest, marking. Swans have been marked with a nick on the beak since about 1560 in England. Scientific ringing was pioneered by Hans Christian Cornelius Mortensen in 1899. Other techniques include radar and satellite tracking. The rate of bird migration over the Alps (up to a height of 150 m) was found to be highly comparable between fixed-beam radar measurements and visual bird counts, highlighting the potential use of this technique as an objective way of quantifying bird migration. Visual bird counts at stopover sites can be very useful for estimating how long unmarked birds remain in a pre- or post-nuptial migratory stopover area. One method of achieving this is to use hydraulic flow models, based on censuses at stopover sites on the route.

Emlen funnel

Stable isotopes of hydrogen, oxygen, carbon, nitrogen, and sulphur can establish avian migratory connectivity between wintering sites and breeding grounds. Stable isotopic methods to establish migratory linkage rely on spatial isotopic differences in bird diet that are incorporated into inert tissues like feathers, or into growing tissues such as claws and muscle or blood.

An approach to identify migration intensity makes use of upward pointing microphones to record the nocturnal contact calls of flocks flying overhead. These are then analyzed in a laboratory to measure time, frequency and species.

An older technique developed by George Lowery and others to quantify migration involves observing the face of the full moon with a telescope and counting the silhouettes of flocks of birds as they fly at night.

Orientation behaviour studies have been traditionally carried out using variants of a setup known as the Emlen funnel, which consists of a circular cage with the top covered by glass or wire-screen so that either the sky is visible or the setup is placed in a planetarium or with other controls on environmental cues. The orientation behaviour of the bird inside the cage is studied quantitatively using the distribution of marks that the bird leaves on the walls of the cage. Other approaches used in pigeon homing studies make use of the direction in which the bird vanishes on the horizon.

== Threats and conservation ==
Human activities have threatened many migratory bird species. The distances involved in bird migration mean that they often cross political boundaries of countries and conservation measures require international cooperation. Several international treaties have been signed to protect migratory species including the Migratory Bird Treaty Act of 1918 of the US. and the African-Eurasian Migratory Waterbird Agreement.

The concentration of birds during migration can put species at risk. Some spectacular migrants have already gone extinct; during the passenger pigeon's (Ectopistes migratorius) migration the enormous flocks were 1.5 kilometres (1 mi) wide, darkening the sky, and 500 km (300 mi) long, taking several days to pass.

Hunting along migration routes threatens some bird species. The populations of Siberian cranes (Leucogeranus leucogeranus) that wintered in India declined due to hunting along the route, particularly in Afghanistan and Central Asia. Birds were last seen in their favourite wintering grounds in Keoladeo National Park in 2002. Structures such as power lines, wind farms and offshore oil-rigs have also been known to affect migratory birds. Other migration hazards include pollution, storms, wildfires, and habitat destruction along migration routes, denying migrants food at stopover points. For example, in the East Asian–Australasian Flyway, up to 65% of key intertidal habitat at the Yellow Sea migration bottleneck has been destroyed since the 1950s.

Other significant areas include stop-over sites between the wintering and breeding territories. A capture-recapture study of passerine migrants with high fidelity for breeding and wintering sites did not show similar strict association with stop-over sites. Unfortunately, many historic stopover sites have been destroyed or drastically reduced due to human agricultural development, leading to an increased risk of bird extinction, especially in the face of climate change.

Conversely, so-called "ship-assisted migration" may be a modern benefit to migrating birds by giving them a mid-ocean rest stop on ships.

=== Stopover site conservation efforts ===
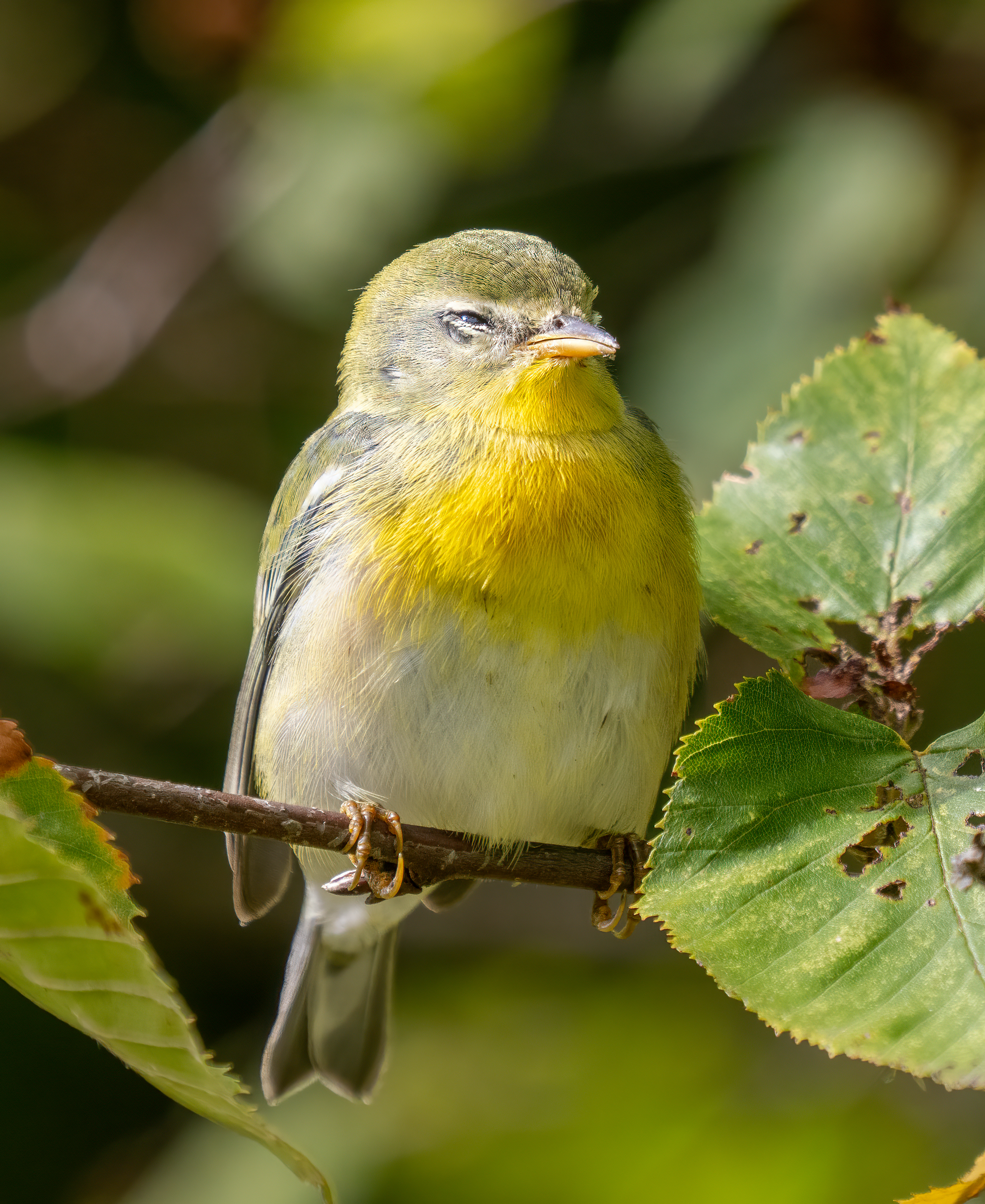
A northern parula resting during fall migration in New York

California's Central Valley was once a massive stopover site for birds traveling along the Pacific Flyway, before being converted into agricultural land. 90% of North America's shorebirds utilize this migration path and the destruction of rest stops has had detrimental impacts on bird populations, as they cannot get adequate rest and food and can be unable to complete their migration. As a solution, conservationists and farmers in the United States are now working together to help provide stopover habitats for migrating birds. In the winter, when many of these birds are migrating, farmers are now flooding their fields in order to provide temporary wetlands for birds to rest and feed before continuing their journey. Rice is a major crop produced along this flyway, and flooded rice paddies have shown to be important areas for at least 169 different bird species. For example, in California, legislation changes have made it illegal for farmers to burn excess rice straw, so instead they have begun flooding their fields during the winter. Similar practices are now taking place across the nation, with the Mississippi Alluvial Valley being a primary area of interest due to its agricultural use and its importance for migration.

Plant debris provides food sources for the birds while the newly formed wetland serves as a habitat for bird prey species such as insects and other invertebrates. In turn, bird foraging assists in breaking down plant matter. Droppings then help to fertilize the field, helping the farmers and in turn significantly decreasing their need for artificial fertilizers by at least 13 percent. Recent studies have shown that the implementation of these temporary wetlands has had significant positive impacts on bird populations, such as the White-fronted Goose, as well as various species of wading birds. The artificial nature of these temporary wetlands also greatly reduces the threat of predation from other wild animals. This practice requires extremely low investment on behalf of the farmers, and researchers believe that mutually beneficial approaches such as this are key to wildlife conservation moving forward. Economic incentives are key to getting more farmers to participate in this practice. However, issues can arise if bird populations are too high with their large amounts of droppings decreasing water quality and potentially leading to eutrophication. Increasing participation in this practice would allow migratory birds to spread out and rest on a wider variety of locations, decreasing the negative impacts of having too many birds congregated in a small area. Using this practice in areas with close proximity to natural wetlands could also greatly increase their positive impact.

== See also ==
- Nairobi Flyways Declaration
- Human-guided migration
- Smithsonian Migratory Bird Center
- Winged Migration, 2001 documentary film

== Sources ==
- Cocker, Mark; Mabey, Richard (2005). Birds Britannica. Chatto & Windus. ISBN 978-0-7011-6907-7.
- Newton, Ian (2007). The Migration Ecology of Birds. doi:10.1016/B978-0-12-517367-4.X5000-1. ISBN 978-0-12-517367-4.
