= Johann Andreas Naumann =

German naturalist (1744–1826)

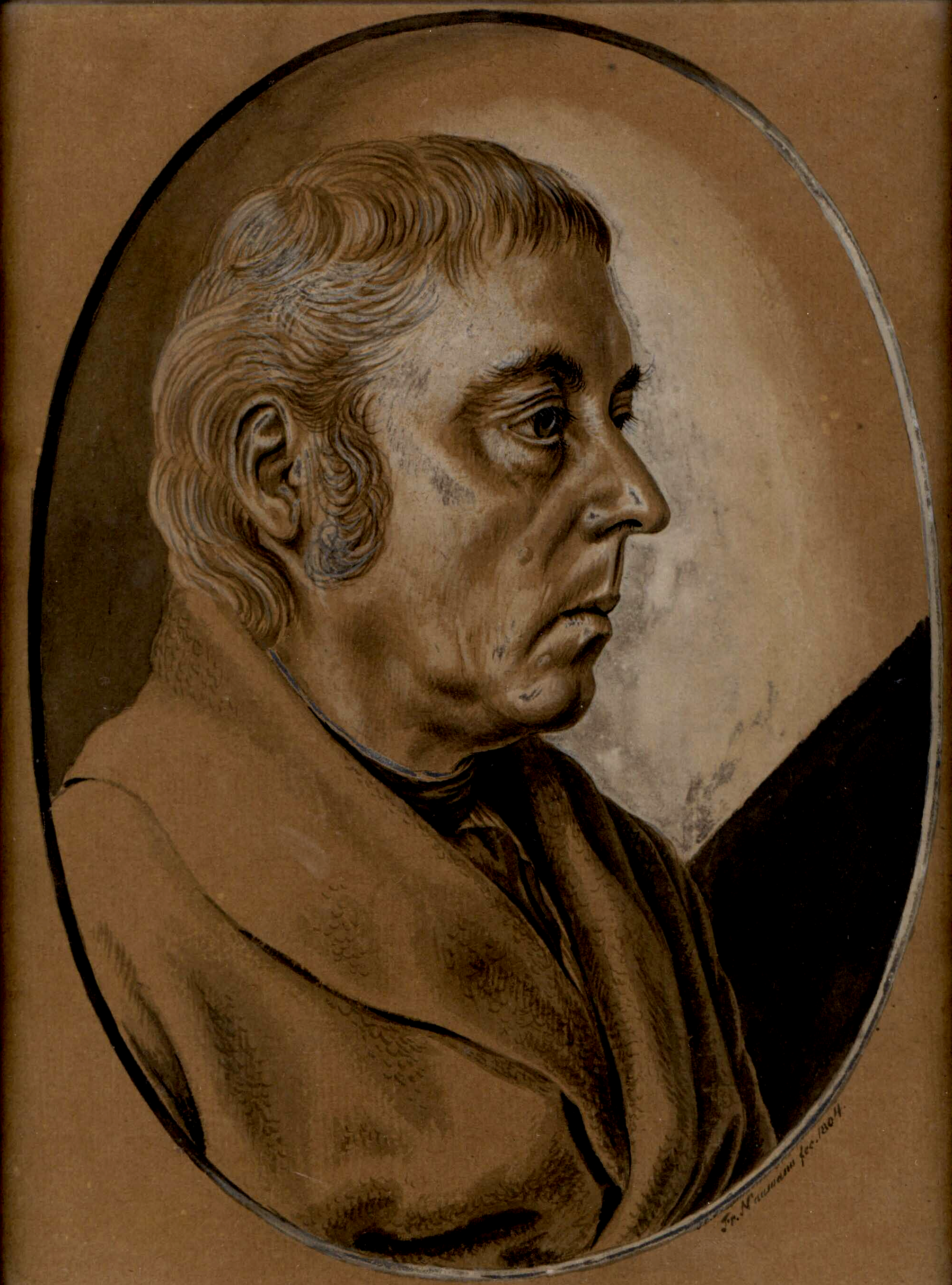
Johann Andreas Naumann

Johann Andreas Naumann (13 April 1744 – 15 May 1826) was a German farmer and an amateur naturalist. He was the father of the ornithologist Johann Friedrich Naumann and the forester Carl Andreas Naumann (1786–1854). Along with his eldest son J.F. Naumann, he wrote a landmark book on the birds of Germany entitled Naturgeschichte der Vögel Deutschlands (1804), and his name has been commemorated in the Latin names of the birds lesser kestrel, Falco naumanni, and the Naumann's thrush, Turdus naumanni.

== Life and work ==
In the preface to the first volume of Naumann's bird book, his son included an autobiographical note of his father. He noted that somewhere during 1636, during the Thirty Years' War, his ancestors had purchased an abandoned farm which the family restored. It had bushes, meadows and ponds and they were filled with birds. The next generation, the grandfather of Naumann (senior) continued in the family traditions of bird-trapping and hunting. They learned about birds by experience. When he was ten years old he was sent to a relative's home from where he went to school in Köthen. At fifteen he returned home as his father had died. The lord of the manor entrusted him to the hunting grounds of Ziebigk where he lived during summers in a garden house. He also worked on the farm during the sowing and harvest season. He enjoyed craft and made household items with wood, horn, bone and later with metal. He later began to read books and learn mathematics, physics and chemistry to help him in his crafts. He was able to make his own hunting equipment and firearms. A series of very wet years (1770-72) flooded the fields, making them impossible to cultivate. They however became good waterfowl habitat and Naumann devised snares, nets and traps to capture and study the birds. He got married in 1779. His wife died in 1789 and he managed the household along with his sons. He wrote the book Der Vogelsteller ("Bird trapper") in 1789. He wrote a book Der Philosophische Bauer ("Philosophical Farmer") in 1791. Naumann saw the need for a book with bird observations made from nature as many of the books he had read had errors. The oldest son helped him with illustrations and engravings for the book on birds by his father. Many of the birds that the father and son documented were quite rare, and were found only once in several years. The Naturgeschichte der Vögel Deutschlands was begun in 1795 and went into 13 volumes with the son writing it entirely after the death of his father. Even the first volume was largely written by the son as the father noted in the preface that he lacked grace and elegance in writing style. Naumann recognized and described the phenomenon of migratory restlessness in caged orioles and pied flycatchers which is now termed as zugunruhe. The son J. F. Naumann produced two more editions of the bird volumes which are recognized as laying the foundations of ornithology in Germany. The first series was published between 1795 and 1817, the second from 1820 to 1844 and the third from 1896 to 1905. The last was titled Naturgeschichte der Vögel Mitteleuropas.
