= Johann Friedrich Naumann =

German scientist, engraver and editor (1780–1857)

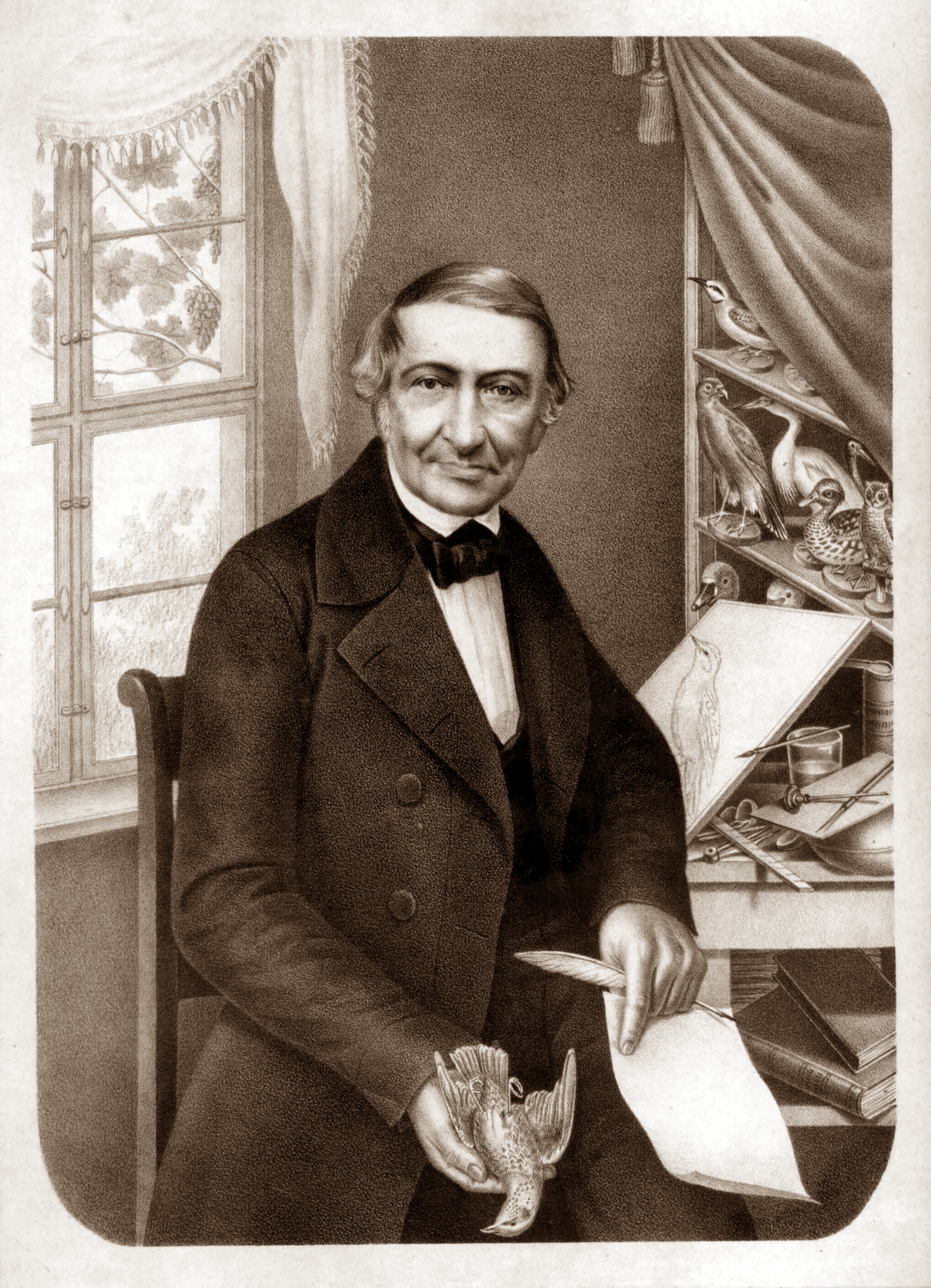
- Prof. Dr. Johann Friedrich Naumann
- Born: 14 February 1780; Dessau-Roßlau, Germany
- Died: 15 August 1857 (aged 77); Ziebigk
- Scientific career
- Fields: Ornithologist
- Author abbrev. (zoology): J. F. Naumann

Johann Friedrich Naumann (14 February 1780 – 15 August 1857) was a German scientist, artist, engraver, and editor. He is regarded as the founder of scientific ornithology in Europe. Along with his father he published The Natural History of German Birds (1820–1844) and The Eggs of German Birds (1818–1828). His father Johann Andreas Naumann (1744–1826) was a naturalist, and his brother Carl Andreas Naumann (1786–1854) was also an ornithologist who became a forester. The German ornithological society named its journal Naumannia.

== Biography ==
Johann Friedrich Naumann was born in Ziebigk, about 10 km southeast of Köthen, on 14 February 1780, the son of Johann Andreas Naumann, a well-known naturalist. The family owned an agricultural estate at Ziebigk since 1639. Naumann's grandfather had set up aviaries on the land and his father shot, caught and studied birds. After attending the princely school at Dessau from 1790 to 1794, he returned home and devoted himself to the study of agriculture, botany, geology, and ornithology. Naumann joined the Halle Natural History Society in 1803. His later work was devoted more exclusively to the ornithology of Germany. In 1822, he published his Naturgeschichte der Vögel Deutschlands (13 vols, Leipzig, 1822), illustrated with plates Naumann engraved himself based on drawings by Friedrich Osterloh of Halle. After noting that they were not of good quality, he began to acquire skills and improve his own drawing skills. The colouring of the copperplate engravings was done by others who were provided printed instructions. Although the early volumes were written by his father, the later ones (from the third volume) were greatly edited by the son. He was also the author of many other ornithological works. The second edition of the book included an introduction to avian anatomy added by Christian Ludwig Nitzsch of Halle. Naumann also noted the calls of the birds and was aware of minute differences in the calls of birds. He pioneered the transcriptions of calls in his descriptions. He loved the classical musicians and had learned musical notation which he also incorporated in his descriptions.

In 1821, Naumann sold his bird collection to Frederick Ferdinand, Duke of Anhalt-Köthen for 2,000 Taler. He was appointed curator of the ducal collection in the Ferdinandsbau in Schloss (Castle) Köthen, which has been accessible to the public since 1835. He was contacted by Nicolaus con Földváry in 1834 and this led to travels in 1835 to Hungary. The younger brother Carl Andreas was made a personal huntsman of Duke August Christian Friedrich and in 1812 following the Duke's death, he was made in-charge of the Kleinzerbst forest as district forester, a position he kept until his death. The birds of the area were examined by Johann Friedrich and his brother. Carl caught more than 27000 birds and shot 22000 over a 28 year period. These included the rare black grouse, golden eagle, Bechstein's thrush. In 1839, Johann Friedrich was awarded an honorary doctorate by the University of Breslau.

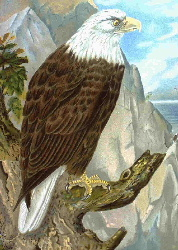
From Naturgeschichte der Vögel Mitteleuropas (Natural History of the Birds of Central Europe).

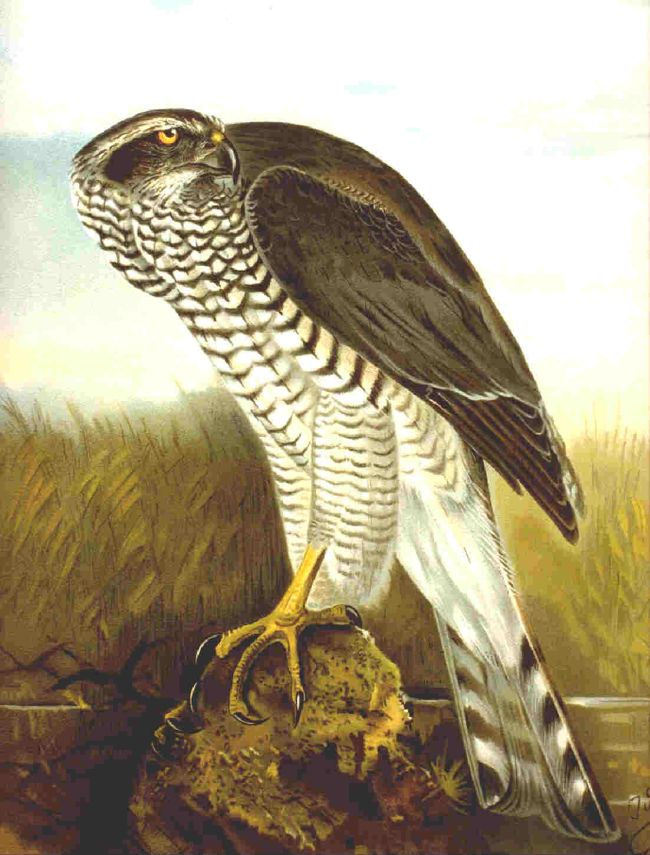
Habicht (Accipiter gentilis). Engraving by Johann Friedrich Naumann.

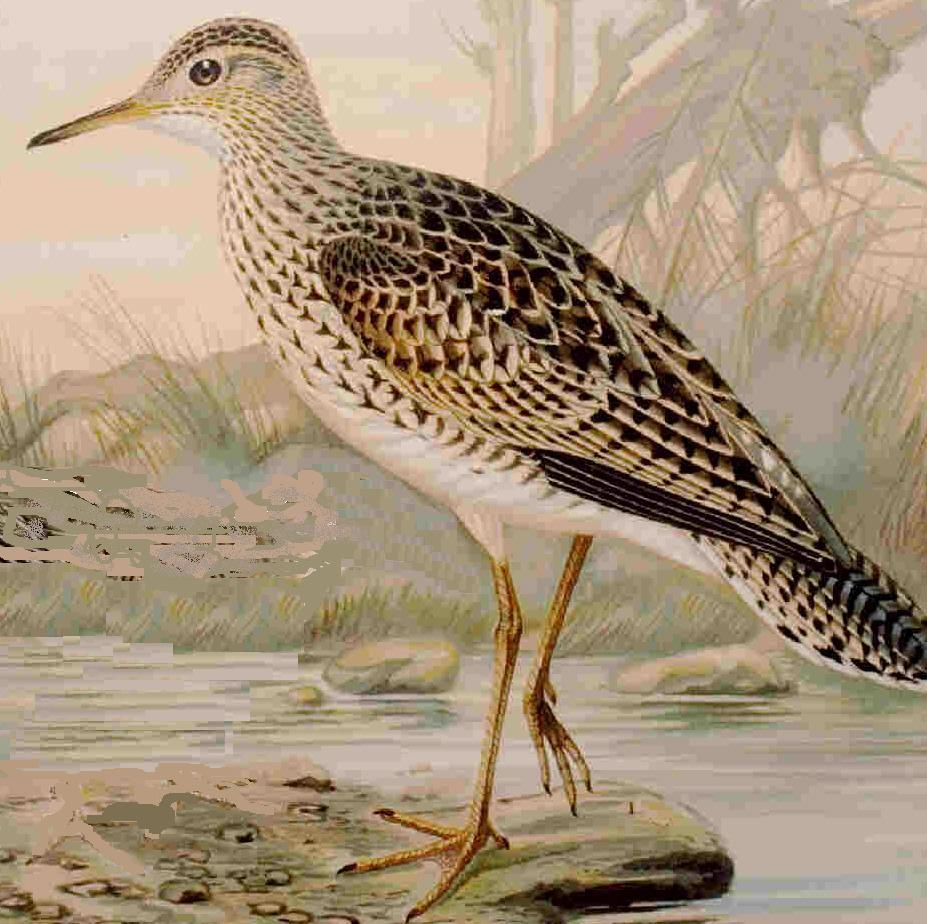
Upland sandpiper Bartramie ou maubèche des champs by Naumann.

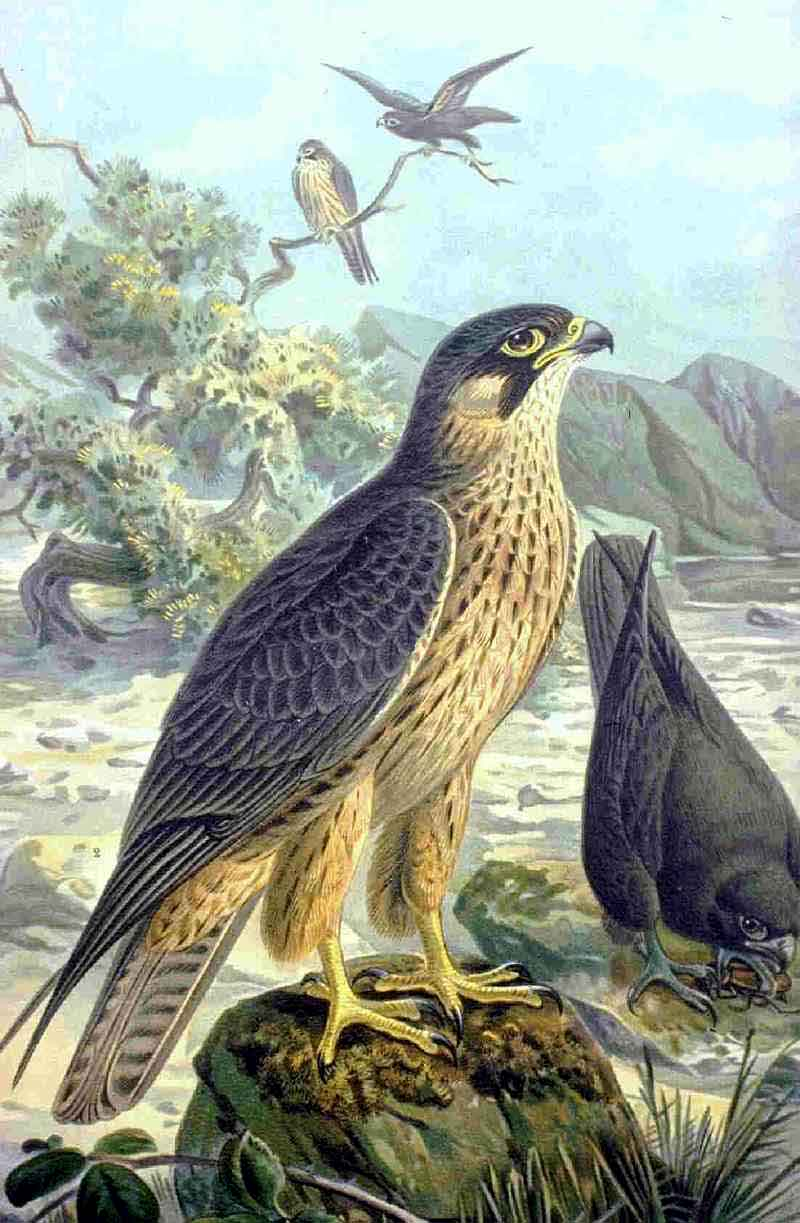
Falco eleonorae.

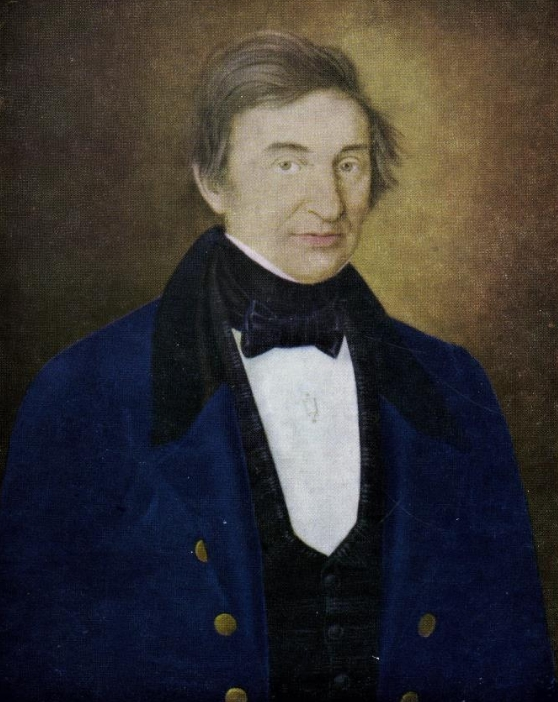
Self-portrait

== Sources ==
- Wilhelm Heß: ADB Vol. 23. Duncker & Humblot, Leipzig 1886, p. 315
- Paul Gottschalk: "Johann Friedrich Naumann" in Mitteldeutsche Lebensbilder, Vol. 1, Lebensbilder des 19. Jahrhunderts, Magdeburg 1926, pp. 65–70.
