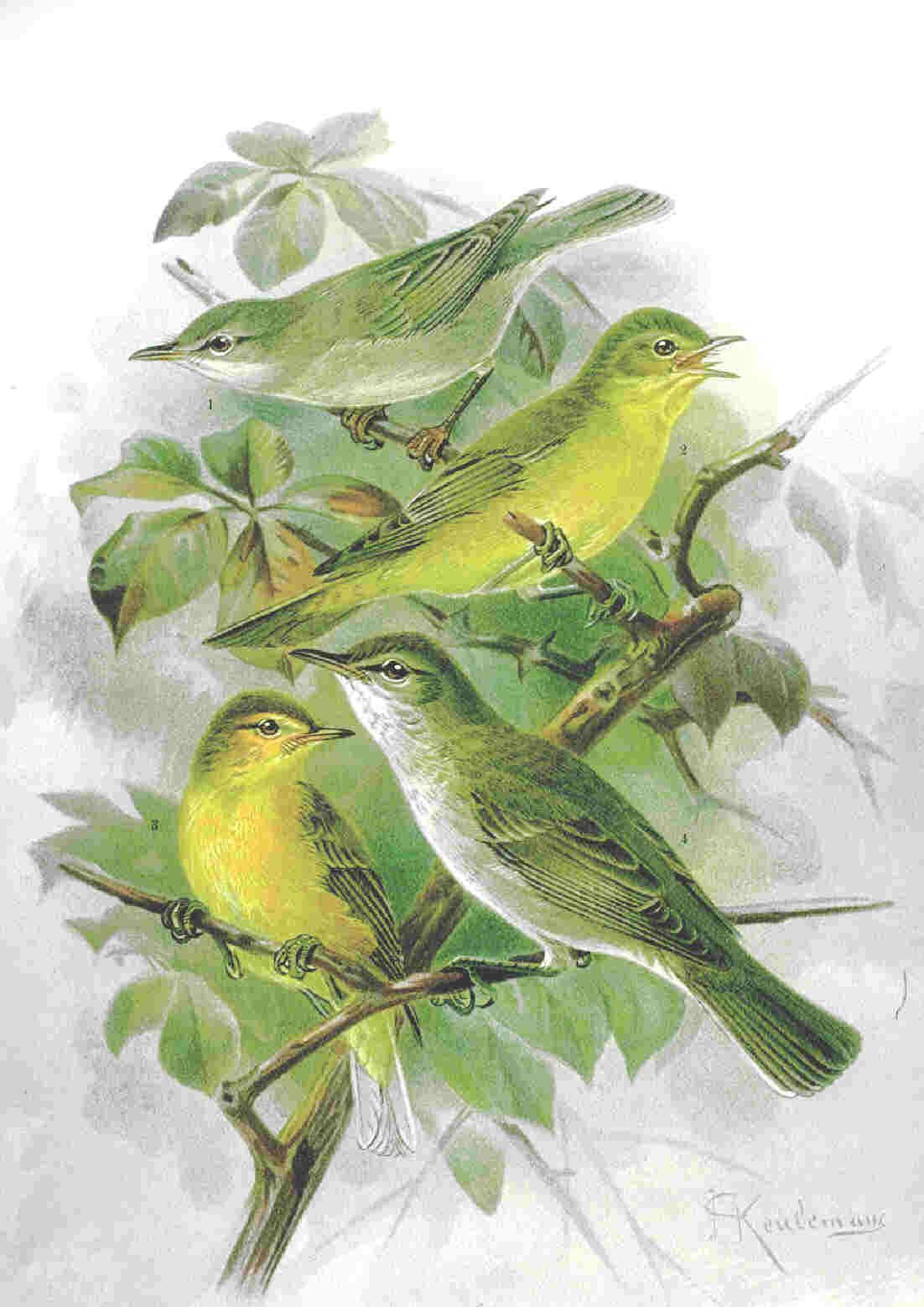
- Several Hippolais species

Scientific classification
- Kingdom: Animalia
- Phylum: Chordata
- Class: Aves
- Order: Passeriformes
- Superfamily: Locustelloidea
- Family: Acrocephalidae

= Tree warbler =

Tree warblers

Group of birds

Tree warblers are medium-sized warblers in the marsh- and tree-warbler family Acrocephalidae. They are found in Europe, Africa and western Asia. Until recently, they were all classified in the single genus Hippolais.

These warblers are associated with trees, though normally in fairly open woodland rather than tight plantations. Compared with the closely related Acrocephalus species, tree warblers have squarer tails and broader bill-bases. Most are unstreaked greenish or brownish above and cream or white below. They are insectivorous, but will occasionally take berries or seeds. The species breeding in temperate regions are mostly strongly migratory.

== Taxonomy ==
All the tree warblers were formerly placed in the "Old World warbler" family Sylviidae but are now separated in the family Acrocephalidae, along with the marsh warblers, Acrocephalus, and some related species.

Considerable evidence, much of it summarised in Parkin et al. (2004), suggests that the genus Hippolais is paraphyletic with respect to Acrocephalus. DNA studies, e.g. Leisler et al. (1997), interpreted by George Sangster in 1997, indicated that the olivaceous and booted/Sykes's warbler grouping (the subgenus Iduna) are more closely related to Acrocephalus species than they are to icterine and melodious warblers and as a result the Dutch Committee on Avian Systematics (CSNA) has moved these four species into Acrocephalus. A subsequent review by the British Ornithologists' Union Records Committee retained the genus Hippolais, for all eight species, but in agreement with Sangster, acknowledged that they fell into two groups.

The retention of the Iduna grouping within Hippolais was done because it was felt that more evidence was needed for its placement, because of low bootstrap values, rather than because of a belief that the status quo was correct – no evidence was put forward to refute the DNA findings. Mark Constantine, in The Sound Approach to Birding, illustrated that there is extensive overlap in song types between species from the two genera, and that vocally, no characters existed which enabled species to be sorted into one genus or the other. Kenneth Williamson and Hadoram Shirihai, in discussing the identification of Hippolais and Acrocephalus warblers stressed the similarities between species in the two genera. Colin Bradshaw, in British Birds, has written several articles on morphological similarity between cross-generic species-pairs e.g. eastern olivaceous and Blyth's reed warblers (Bradshaw 2000) and paddyfield and booted warblers (e.g. Bradshaw & Steele 1995, Bradshaw & Steele 1997, the latter a response to Lars Svensson's comments on Bradshaw & Steele 1995).

The species are:

Genus Iduna

- Thick-billed warbler, Iduna aedon
- Booted warbler, Iduna caligata
- Sykes's warbler, Iduna rama
- Western olivaceous warbler (or isabelline warbler), Iduna opaca
- Eastern olivaceous warbler, Iduna pallida
- Mountain yellow warbler, Iduna similis
- African yellow warbler, Iduna natalensis

Genus Hippolais

- Upcher's warbler, Hippolais languida
- Olive-tree warbler, Hippolais olivetorum
- Melodious warbler, Hippolais polyglotta
- Icterine warbler, Hippolais icterina

Genus Calamonastides

- Papyrus yellow warbler, Calamonastides gracilirostris
