= Chloropeta =

Genus of birds

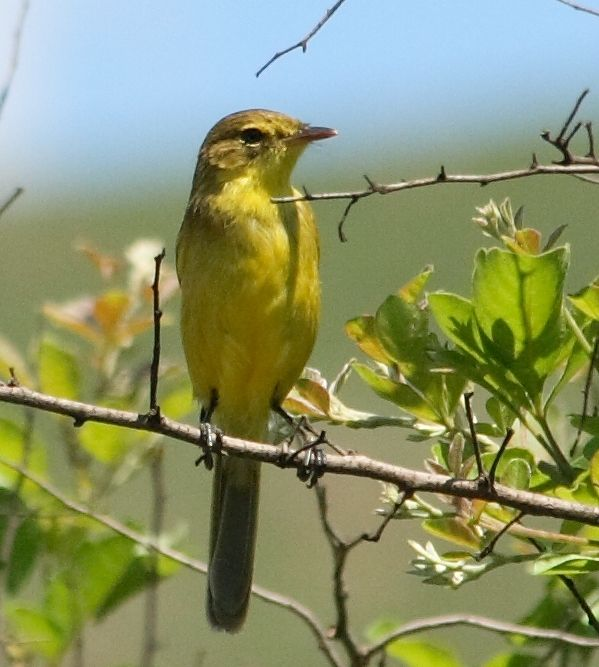
Dark-capped yellow warbler (Chloropeta natalensis)

Chloropeta was a genus of Acrocephalidae warblers; formerly, they were placed in the paraphyletic "Old World warblers". Now the papyrus yellow warbler is placed in its monotypic genus Calamonastides, with the others placed in the genus Iduna.

It contained the following species:

- Papyrus yellow warbler (Chloropeta gracilirostris)
- African yellow warbler (Chloropeta natalensis)
- Mountain yellow warbler (Chloropeta similis)
