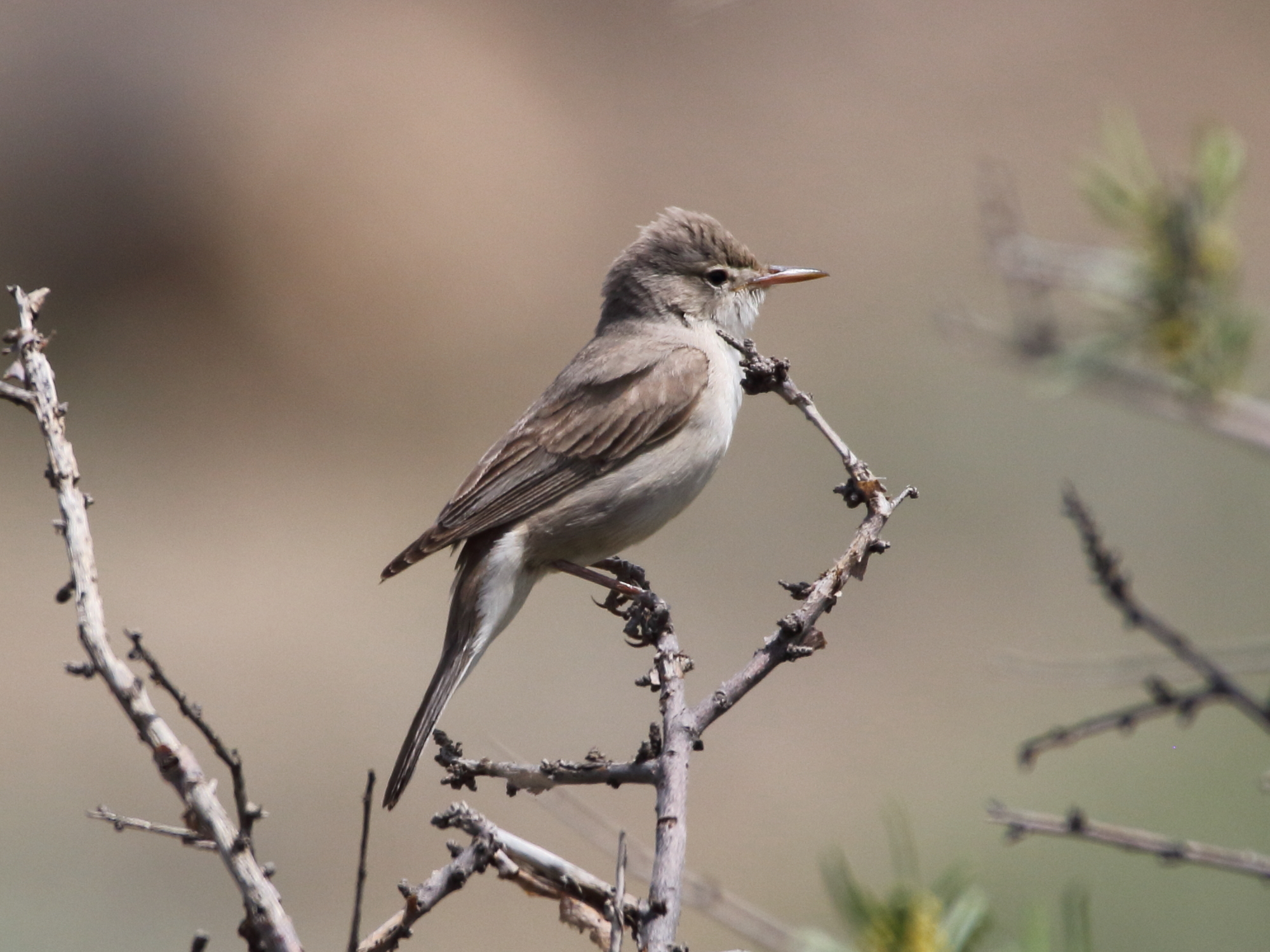

Conservation status
- Least Concern (IUCN 3.1)

Scientific classification
- Kingdom: Animalia
- Phylum: Chordata
- Class: Aves
- Order: Passeriformes
- Family: Acrocephalidae
- Genus: Hippolais
- Species: H. languida

Binomial name
- Hippolais languida (Hemprich & Ehrenberg, 1833)
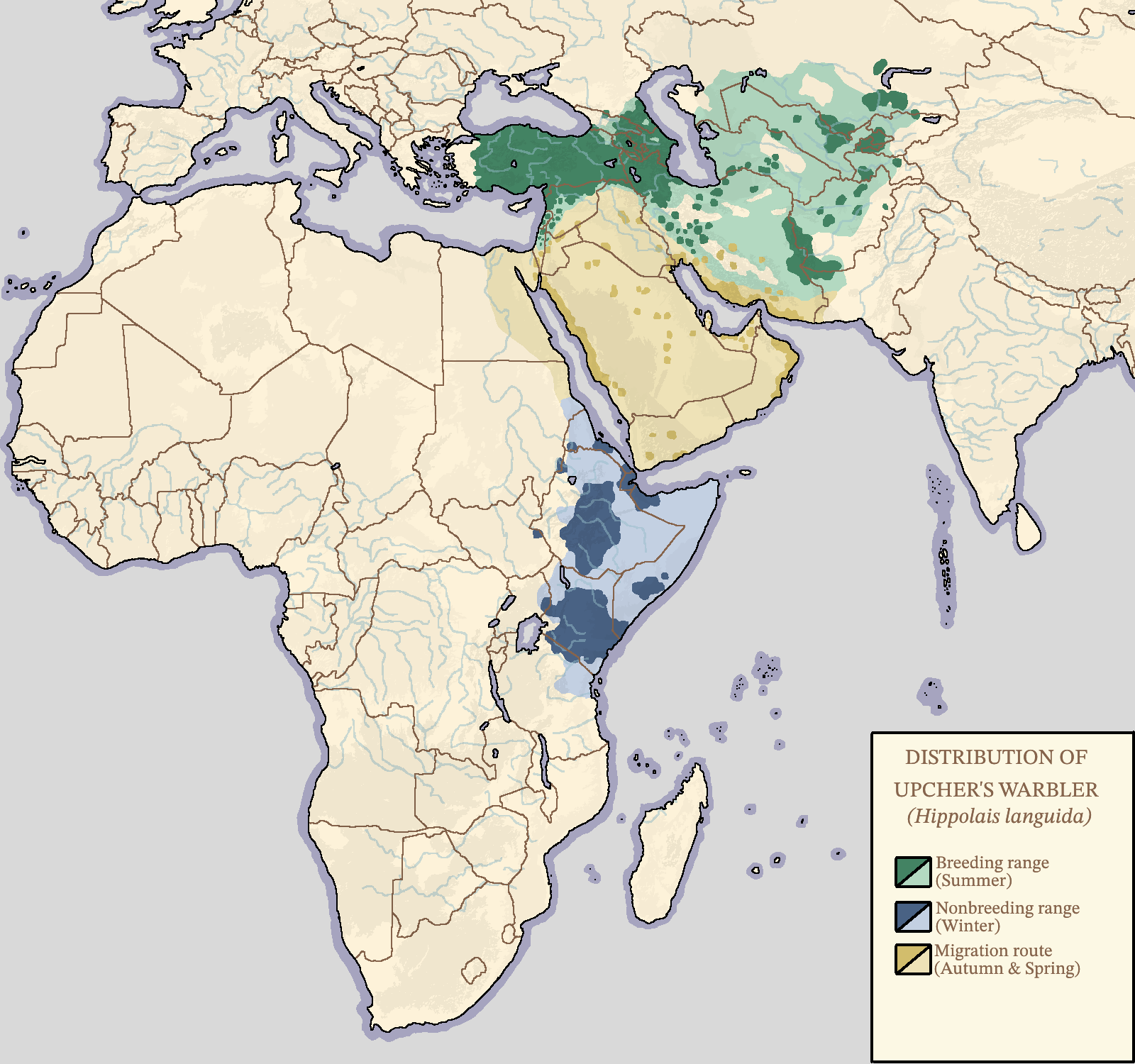
- Distribution of Upcher's Warbler

= Upcher's warbler =

Species of bird

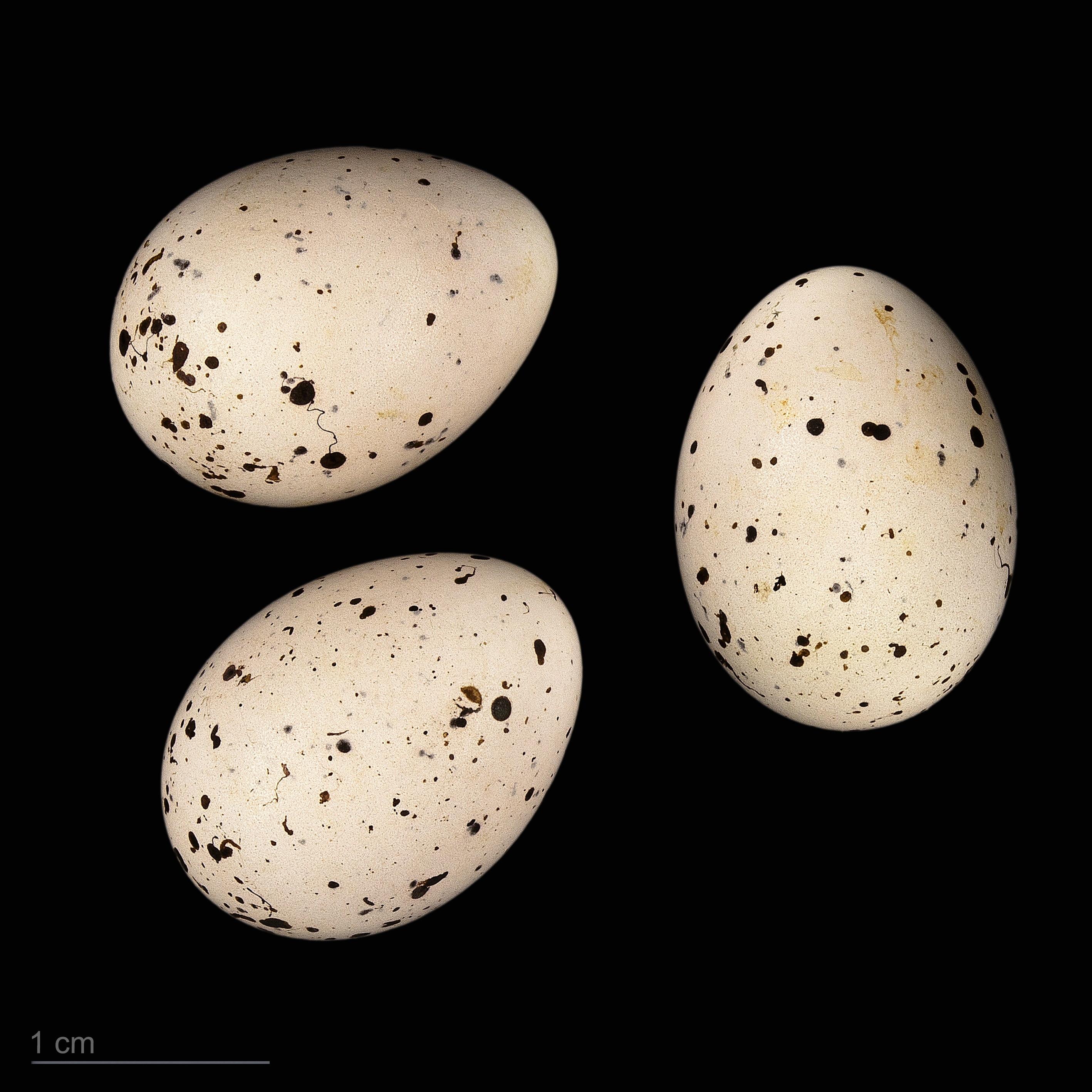
Hippolais languida - MHNT

Upcher's warbler (Hippolais languida) is an Old World warbler in the tree warbler genus Hippolais. It breeds in an area from Turkey south and east to Pakistan. It is migratory, wintering in eastern Africa, from Eritrea and Somalia south to Tanzania.

This small passerine bird is a species found in semi-desert habitats, frequenting bushy scrub and thickets of tamarisk. Four or five eggs are laid in a nest in bushes and low trees.

This is a medium-sized warbler, similar in size to the icterine warbler, with a slightly longer bill and shorter wings and a longer tail. Its frequent tail movement is reminiscent of a Sylvia warbler or a chat. Its rather grey plumage is similar to the olivaceous warbler, but tail movements are diagnostic.

It feeds on invertebrates. Its song is similar to that of other Hippolais warblers, but distinctive and unmistakable, and entirely different from that of the olivaceous warbler. Ehrenberg's original description of this bird was 'rather vague' and it was redescribed by Henry Baker Tristram in 1864, naming it Hippolais upcheri after his friend Henry Morris Upcher. This is the origin of the bird's common name.
