= Olivaceous warbler =

Olivaceous warbler can refer to one of two bird species, formerly regarded as conspecific:

- Western olivaceous warbler Hippolais opaca
- Eastern olivaceous warbler Hippolais pallida
