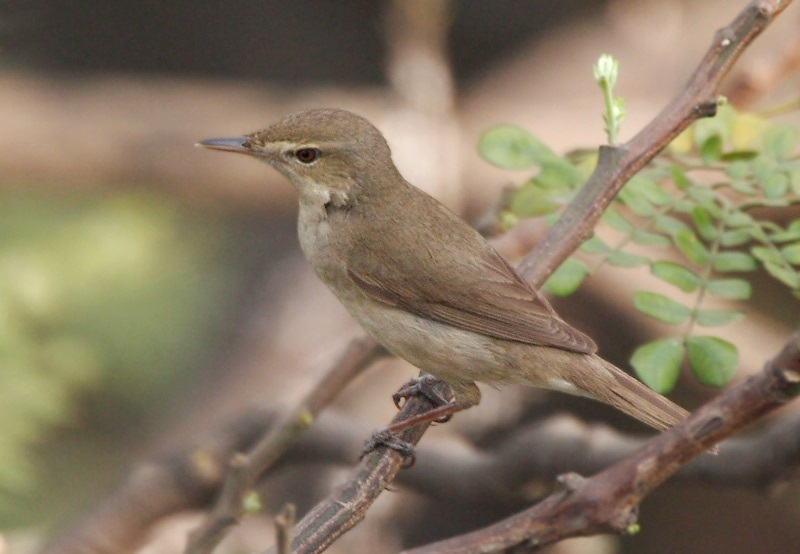
- Wintering in West Bengal, India

Conservation status
- Least Concern (IUCN 3.1)

Scientific classification
- Domain: Eukaryota
- Kingdom: Animalia
- Phylum: Chordata
- Class: Aves
- Order: Passeriformes
- Family: Acrocephalidae
- Genus: Iduna
- Species: I. rama

Binomial name
- Iduna rama (Sykes, 1832)
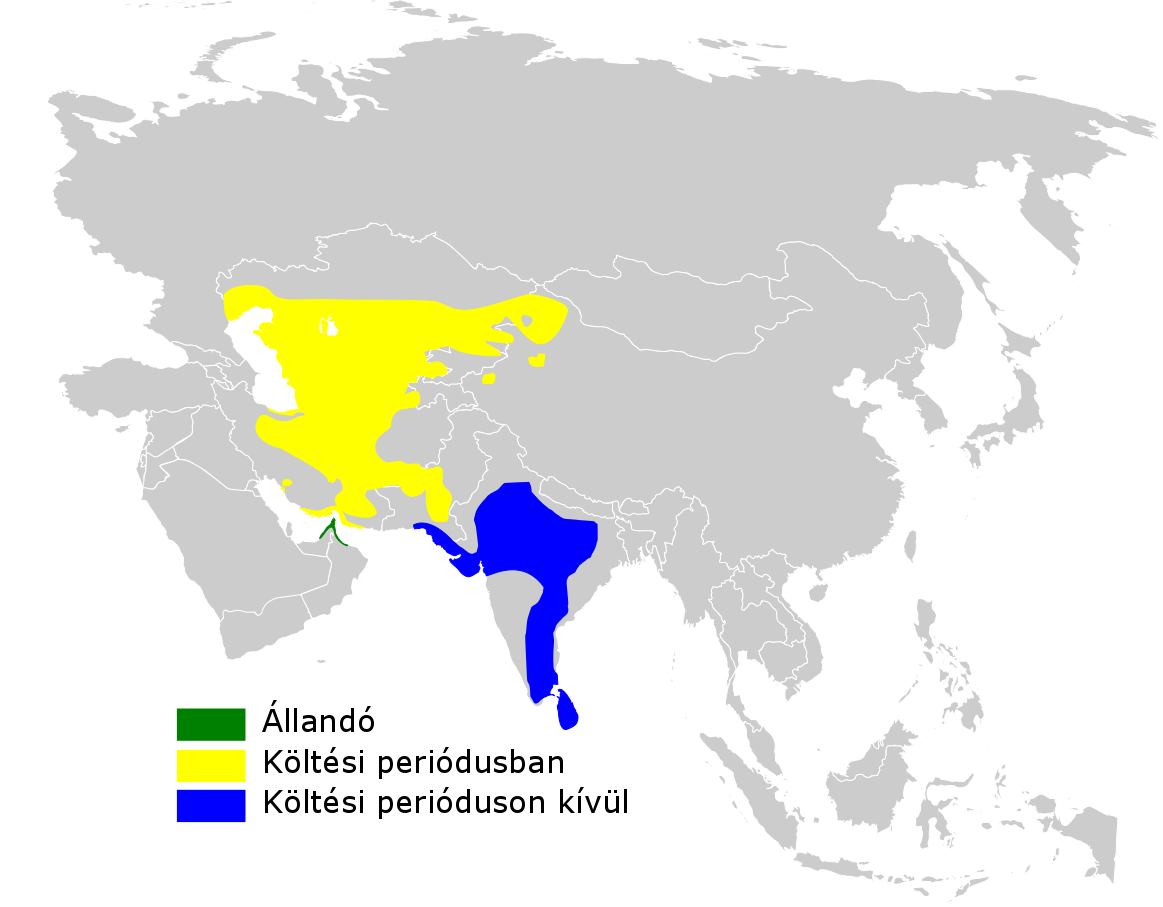
- Distribution of Sykes's Warbler Resident Breeding Non-breeding

Synonyms
- Hippolais rama Sykes, 1832

= Sykes's warbler =

Species of bird

Sykes's warbler (Iduna rama) is an Old World warbler in the tree warbler family. It was formerly considered a subspecies of the booted warbler, but is now considered a full species. Its breeding range is from northeast Arabia to Turkestan, west China and Afghanistan. Like the booted warbler, many populations of the species migrate in winter to the Indian subcontinent as far south as Sri Lanka.

== Etymology ==
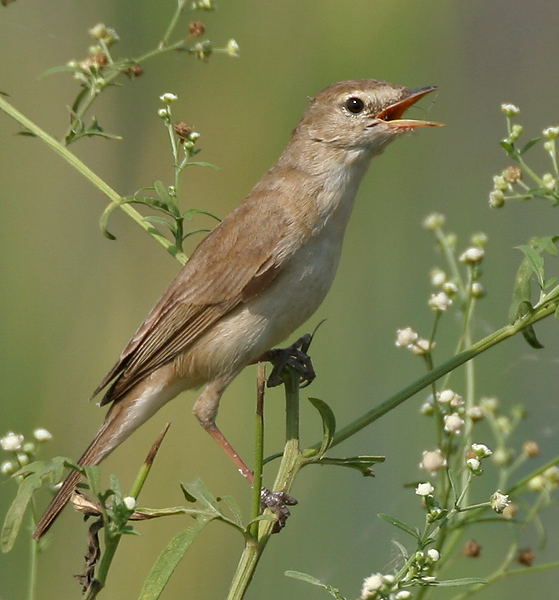
Sykes's warbler in Krishna Wildlife Sanctuary, Andhra Pradesh, India.

The English name commemorates the Colonel William Henry Sykes who served in the British military in India. Keyserling and Blasius gave no explanation of the genus name Iduna, though in Norse mythology Iðunn, or Iduna, is the goddess of spring and fertility who was changed into a sparrow to enable her rescue by Loki. The specific epithet rama refers to the Hindu god Rama, an incarnation of Vishnu.

== Taxonomy ==
Molecular phylogeny studies in 2009 suggested a clade sister to Chloropeta and separate from Hippolais in the strict sense resulting in the removal of this species from the genus Hippolais and placement in a resurrected older genus name of Iduna. There are differences in the nesting and egg morphology between rama and caligata.

== Habitat ==
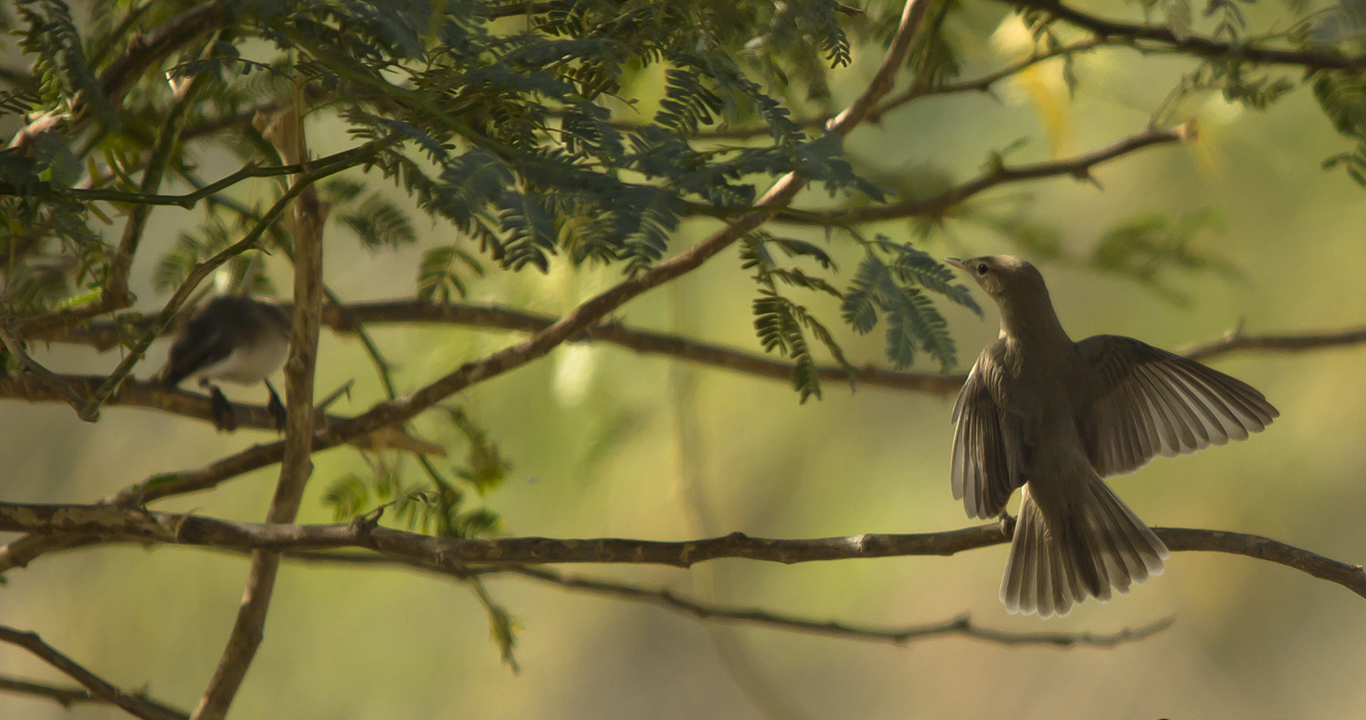
Protecting territory from Lesser Whitethroat at Kutch

It is a small passerine found in open country with bushes and other tall vegetation. Three or four eggs are laid in a nest in a bush or vegetation. Like most warblers they are insectivorous.

== Description ==
It is a small warbler, especially compared to others in their genus. They are pale brown above and whitish below with buff flanks. The outer tail feathers have pale edges. They have a short pale supercilium, and the bill is strong and pointed. Sykes's warbler is larger and greyer than the booted warbler, and most resembles an eastern olivaceous warbler.
