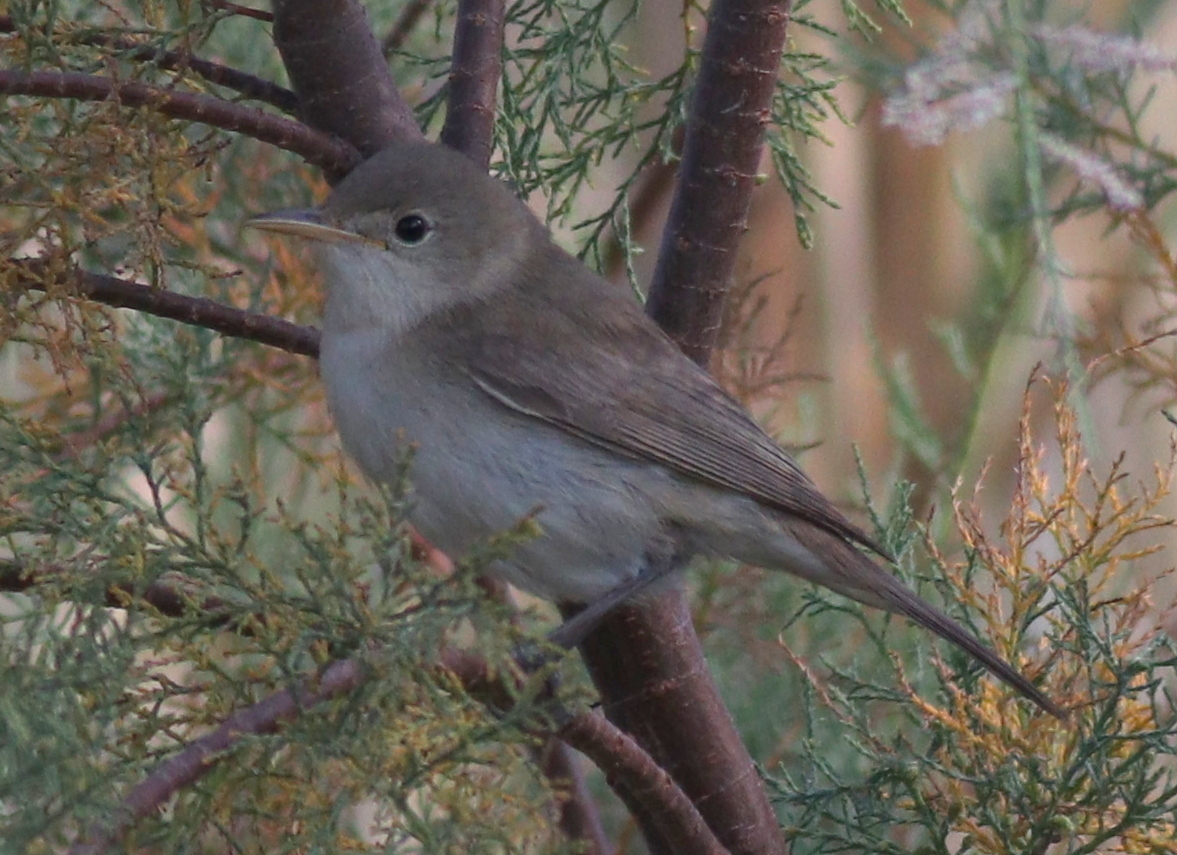
- in Almería, Spain

Conservation status
- Least Concern (IUCN 3.1)

Scientific classification
- Kingdom: Animalia
- Phylum: Chordata
- Class: Aves
- Order: Passeriformes
- Family: Acrocephalidae
- Genus: Iduna
- Species: I. opaca

Binomial name
- Iduna opaca (Cabanis, 1851)
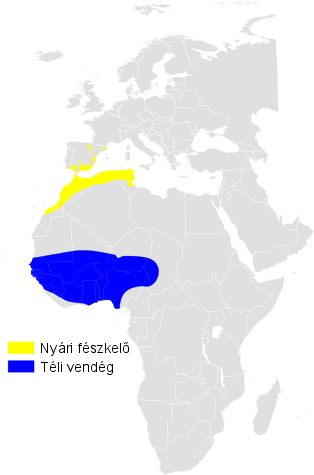
- Distribution of Western Olivaceous Warbler Summer Resident (Breeding) Winter Visitor

Synonyms
- Hippolais opaca

= Western olivaceous warbler =

Species of bird

The western olivaceous warbler (Iduna opaca), also known as the isabelline warbler, is a "warbler", formerly placed in the Old World warblers when these were a paraphyletic wastebin taxon. It is now considered a member of the acrocephaline warblers, Acrocephalidae, in the tree warbler genus Iduna. It was formerly regarded as part of a wider "olivaceous warbler" species, but as a result of modern taxonomic developments, this species is now usually considered distinct from the eastern olivaceous warbler, Iduna pallida.

== Characteristics ==
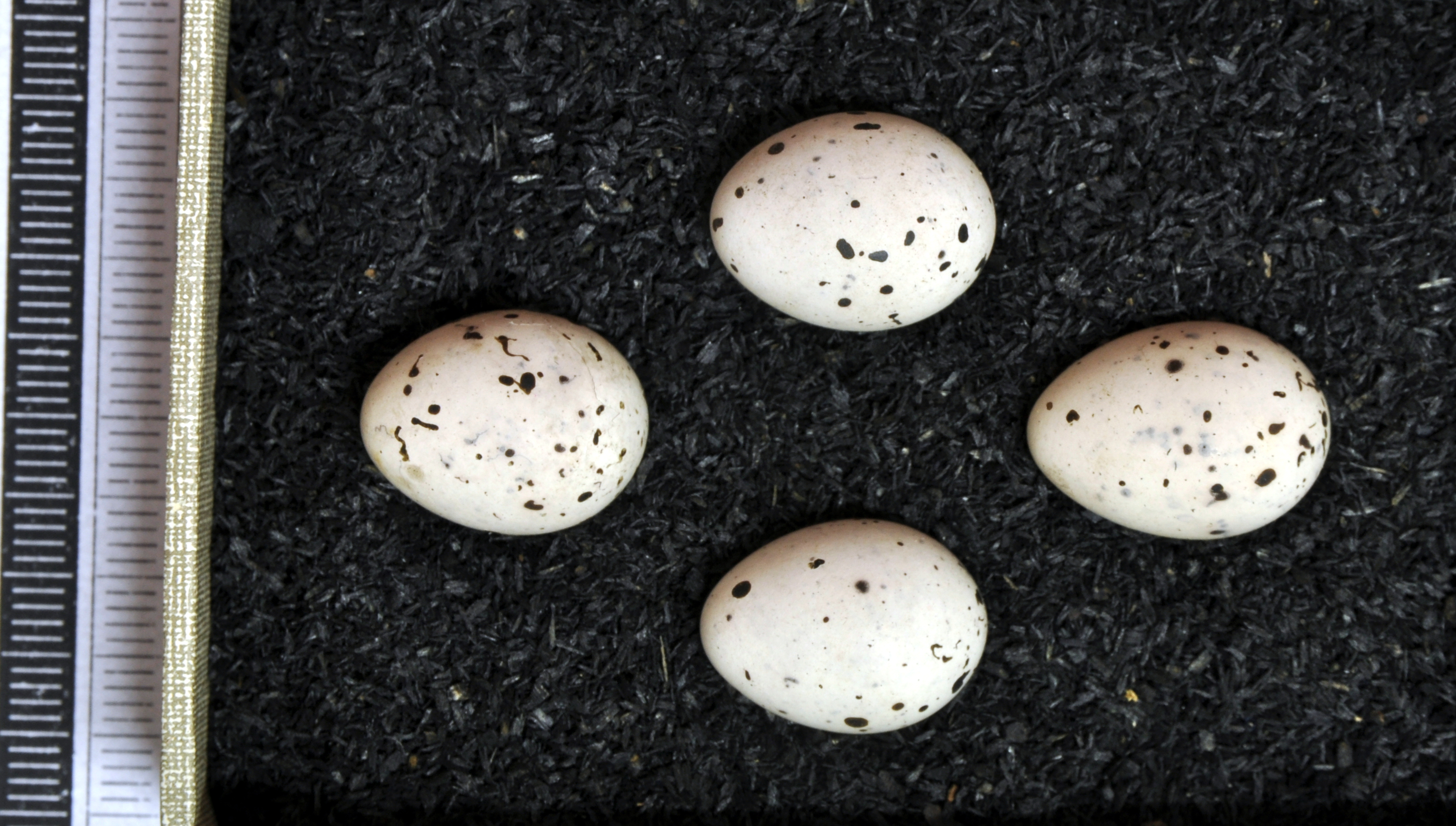
Eggs, Collection Museum Wiesbaden

It is a small passerine bird, found in dry open country, including cultivation, with bushes or some trees. Two or three eggs are laid in a nest in low undergrowth or a bush. Like most warblers, the western olivaceous warbler is insectivorous.

It is a medium-sized warbler, more like a very pale reed warbler than its relative the melodious warbler. The adults have a plain pale brown back and whitish underparts. Its body length is about 13–14 centimetres (5.1–5.5 in), wingspan 18–21 centimetres (7.1–8.3 in) and weight 8–13 grams (0.28–0.46 oz). The bill is strong and pointed and the legs grey. The sexes are identical, as with most warblers, but young birds are more buff on the belly.

This species doesn't wiggle its tail or does it uncommonly. Western olivaceous warbler searches for food at different heights.

It breeds in Iberia and north Africa. It is migratory, wintering in sub-Saharan Africa. It is a rare vagrant to northern Europe.

The western olivaceous warbler is larger and has a browner tinge to the upperparts than the eastern olivaceous warbler. It also has a larger bill. The song is a fast nasal babbling.

== Distribution ==
=== North Africa ===
The western olivaceous warbler occurs mainly as a passage migrant in southeast Morocco, although it also may breed in some densely vegetated areas there.
