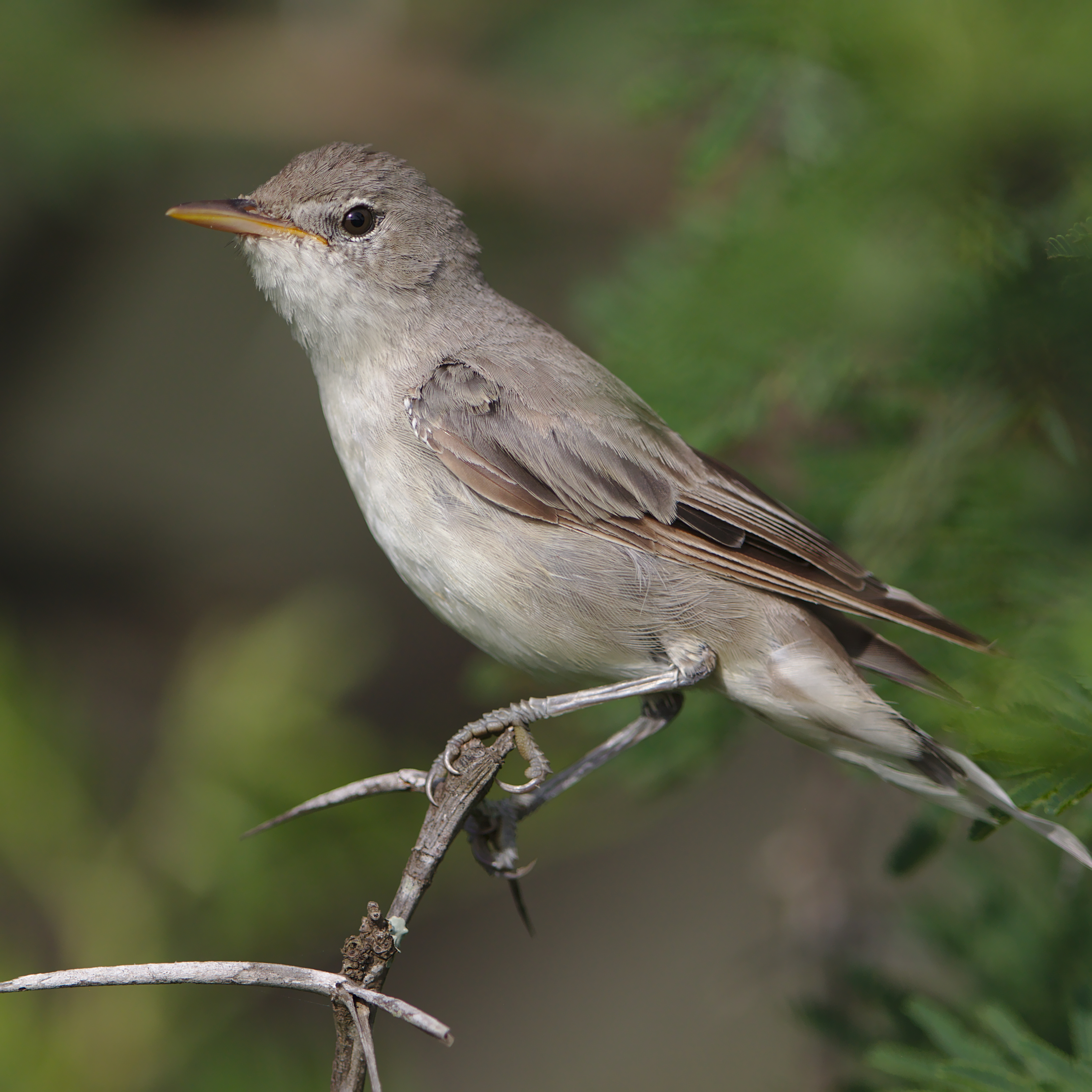
- In South Africa

Conservation status
- Least Concern (IUCN 3.1)

Scientific classification
- Kingdom: Animalia
- Phylum: Chordata
- Class: Aves
- Order: Passeriformes
- Family: Acrocephalidae
- Genus: Hippolais
- Species: H. olivetorum

Binomial name
- Hippolais olivetorum (Strickland, 1837)
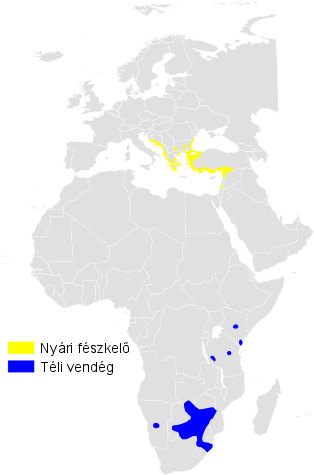
- Distribution of Olive-tree Warbler Summer resident (Breeding) Winter visitor

Synonyms
- Salicaria olivetorum Strickland, 1837

= Olive-tree warbler =

Species of bird

The olive-tree warbler (Hippolais olivetorum) is a species of passerine bird in the family Acrocephalidae, the reed and tree warblers. It breeds in southeast Europe and the Near East. It is migratory, wintering in eastern and southern Africa, from Kenya south to South Africa.

== Taxonomy ==
The olive-tree warbler was first formally described as Salicaria olivetorum in 1837 by the English geologist, ornithologist, naturalist and systematist Hugh Strickland with its type locality given as Zante in the Ionian Islands, Western Greece. This species is now classified in the genus Hippolais, the tree warblers, within the family Acrocephalidae. All the "Old World warblers" were formerly classified within the wastebin taxon known as Sylviidae sensu lato but in the late 20th Century molecular studies resulted in this taxon being divided into a number of families.

== Etymology ==
The olive-tree warbler belongs to the genus Hippolais, this name is from Ancient Greek hupolais, as misspelt by Linnaeus. It referred to a small bird mentioned by Aristotle and others and may be onomatopoeic or derived from hupo,"under", and laas, "stone". The specific name olivetorum is Latin for "of the olive groves".

== Description ==
The olive-tree warbler is a relatively large warbler species with a long, thick bill which has on obvious orange -yellow lower mandible. The upperparts are pale olive-grey in colour, with a noticeable pale wing panel, while the underparts are mostly whitish. The tail is long and dark grey in colour. It is 18 cm (7.1 in) in length, with a wingspan of 24 to 26 cm (9.4 to 10.2 in) and weighs between 19 and 23 g (0.67 and 0.81 oz).

=== Vocalisations ===
The olive-tree warbler's call is a deep "chack" note, the song is a fast, gruff and loud, with a cyclical repetition of chacking sounds, interspersed with softer sounds.

== Distribution and habitat ==
The olive-tree warbler breeds in the southern and western Balkans, in south eastern Europe, and in southern Anatolia and northern Mesopotamia, in Western Asia. It winters in southern Africa. For breeding this species uses orchards, olive groves open oak woodlands, maquis on upland slopes, and sparsely wooded grassland They show a preference for some taller trees to be part of their habitat. Outside of the breeding season they will use a variety of habitats, and may even be found in arid areas.

== Biology ==
The olive-tree warbler breeds in May and June, building a sturdy and deep cup of plant material which is covered with spiders' webs and lined with soft material such as thistledown and animal hair. The nest is located in the fork of a branch in a tree and the clutch is 3 or 4. They feed mainly on invertebrates, particularly insects, although in the summer fruit is eaten, including figs.

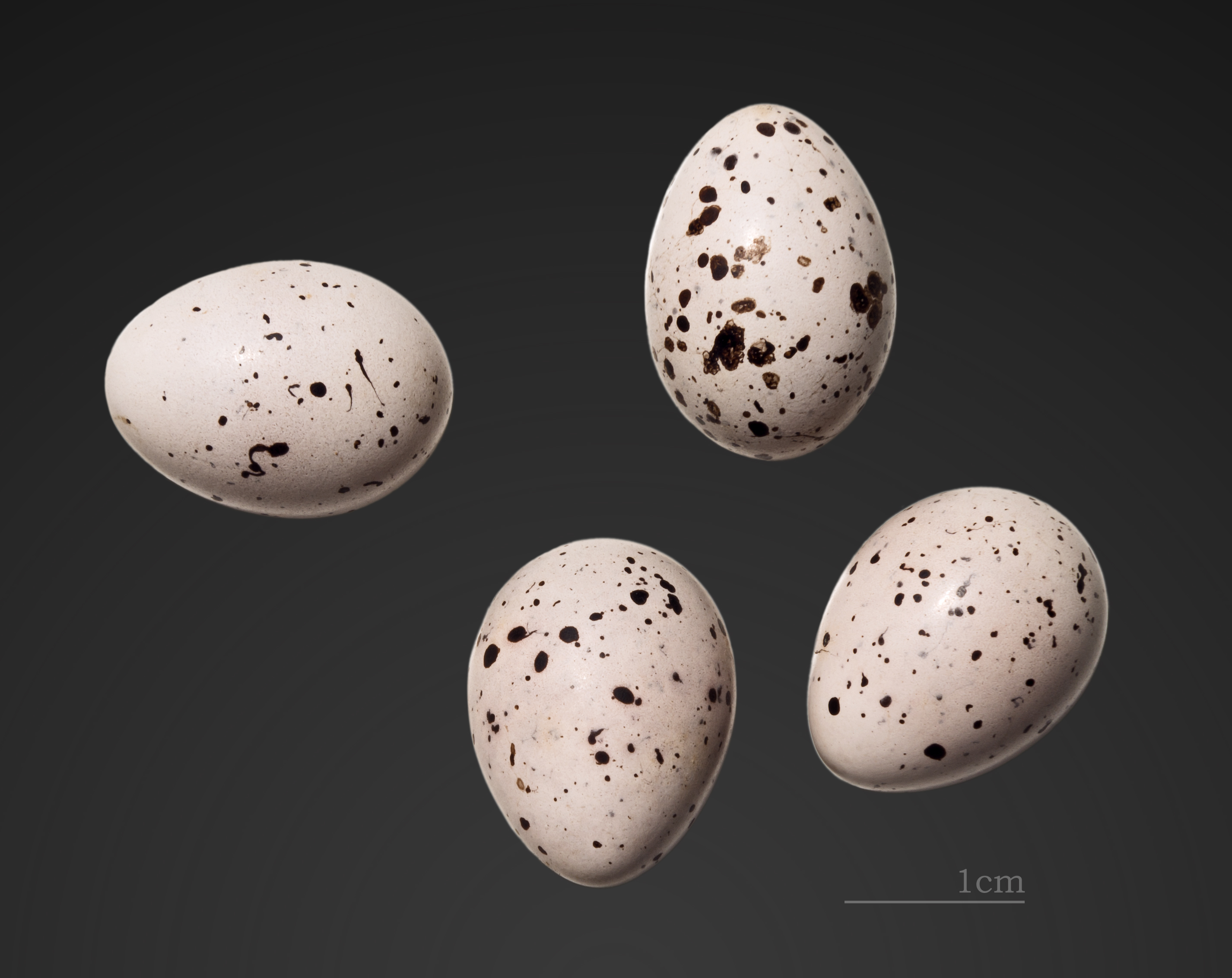
Eggs, Collection MHNT
