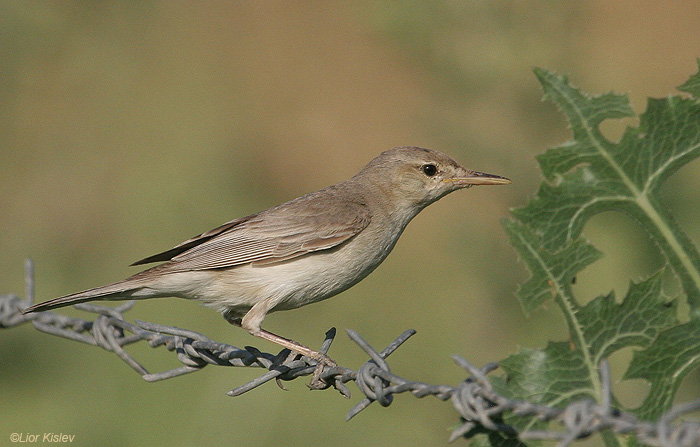

Conservation status
- Least Concern (IUCN 3.1)

Scientific classification
- Kingdom: Animalia
- Phylum: Chordata
- Class: Aves
- Order: Passeriformes
- Family: Acrocephalidae
- Genus: Iduna
- Species: I. pallida

Binomial name
- Iduna pallida (Hemprich & Ehrenberg, 1833)

Subspecies
- I. p. elaeica - (Lindermayer, A, 1843); I. p. reiseri - (Hilgert, 1908); I. p. pallida - (Hemprich & Ehrenberg, 1833); I. p. alulensis - (Ash, Pearson, DJ & Bensch, 2005); I. p. laeneni - (Niethammer, 1955)
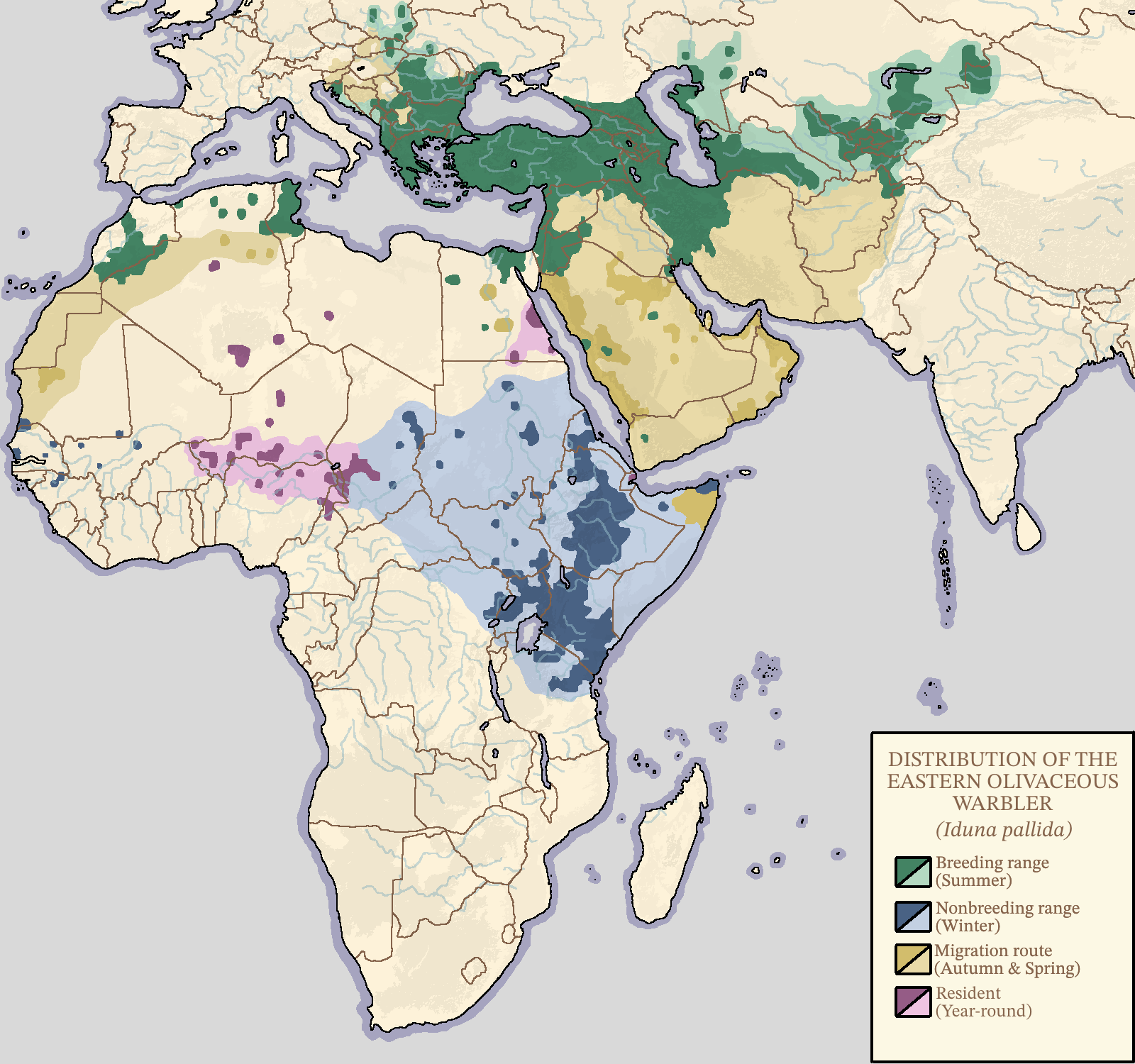
- Range of I. pallida

Synonyms
- Hippolais pallida (Ehrenberg, 1833)

= Eastern olivaceous warbler =

Species of bird

The eastern olivaceous warbler (Iduna pallida), known simply as the olivaceous warbler when its western relative is referred to as the 'isabelline warbler', is a small passerine bird with drab plumage tones, that is native to the Old World. For the most part it breeds in southeastern Europe, the Middle East and adjacent western Asia, and winters in the northern Afrotropics.

== Taxonomy ==
The eastern olivaceous warbler is a "warbler", formerly placed in the Old World warblers when these were a paraphyletic wastebin taxon. It is now considered a member of the acrocephaline warblers, Acrocephalidae, in the tree warbler genus Iduna. It was formerly regarded as part of a wider "olivaceous warbler" species, but as a result of modern taxonomic developments, this species is now usually considered distinct from the western olivaceous warbler, Iduna opaca.

== Etymology ==
Keyserling and Blasius gave no explanation of the genus name Iduna. The specific pallida is Latin for "pale".

== Habits ==
This small passerine bird is found in dry open country, including cultivation, with bushes or some trees. Like most warblers it is insectivorous.

== Range ==
It is migratory, wintering in sub-Saharan Africa or Arabia. It is a rare vagrant to northern Europe.

== Breeding ==
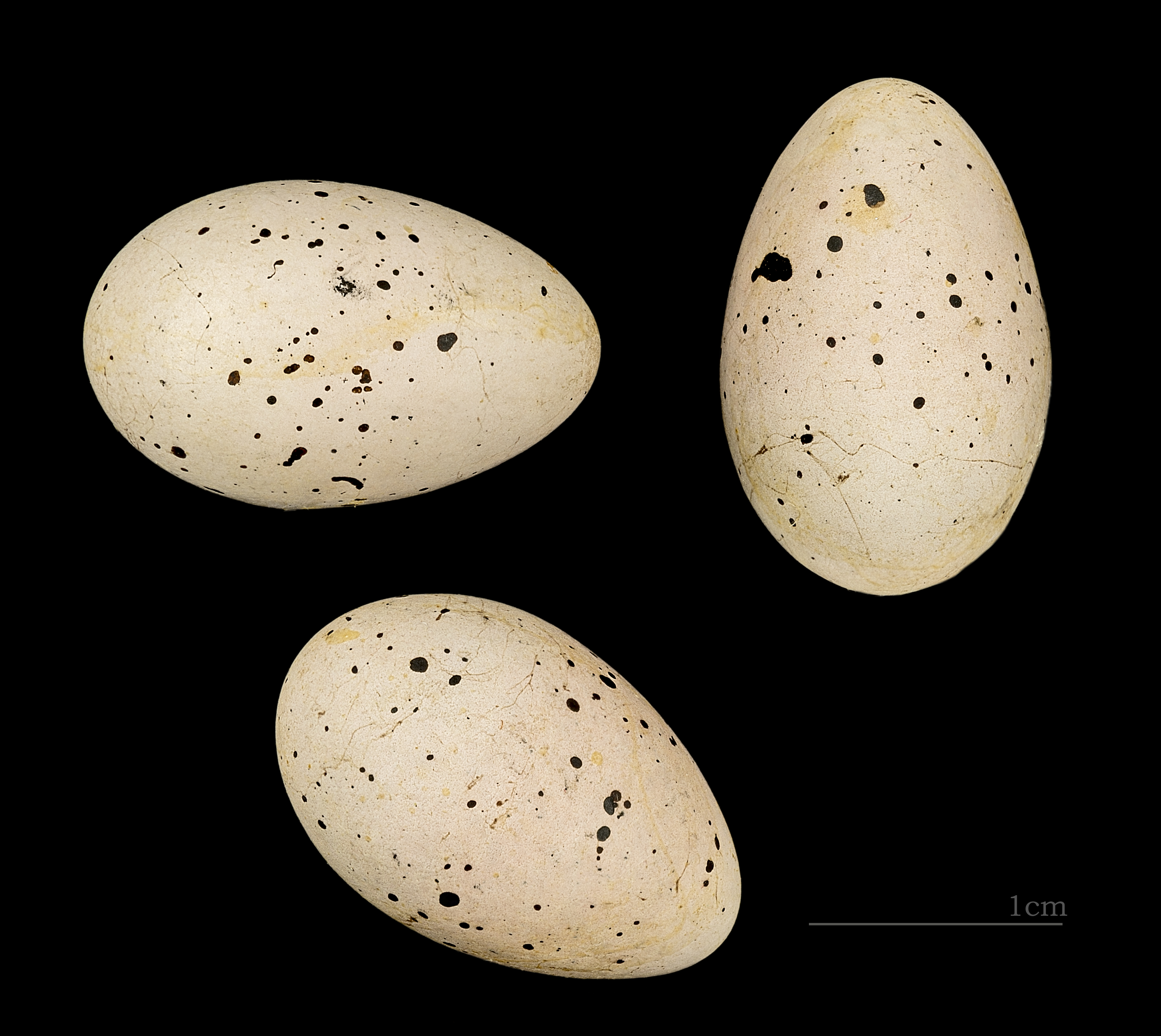
Eggs of Iduna pallida elaeica MHNT

The eastern olivaceous warbler breeds from southeastern Europe and the Middle East to western Asia, and the subspecies reiseri is thought to be locally common as a breeding species in southeast Morocco. Two or three eggs are laid in a nest which is placed low in a bush or in undergrowth.

== Description ==
It is a medium-sized warbler, more like a very pale reed warbler than its relative the melodious warbler. The adult has a plain pale brown back and whitish underparts. The bill is strong and pointed and the legs grey. The sexes are identical, as with most warblers, but young birds are more buff on the belly. It has a characteristic downward tail flick.

The western olivaceous warbler differs from this species in being larger and having a browner tinge to the upperparts; it also has a larger bill. The eastern olivaceous warbler sometimes has a greenish tinge to its upperparts, and can be very difficult to separate from Sykes's warbler, Iduna rama. The song is a fast nasal babbling.
