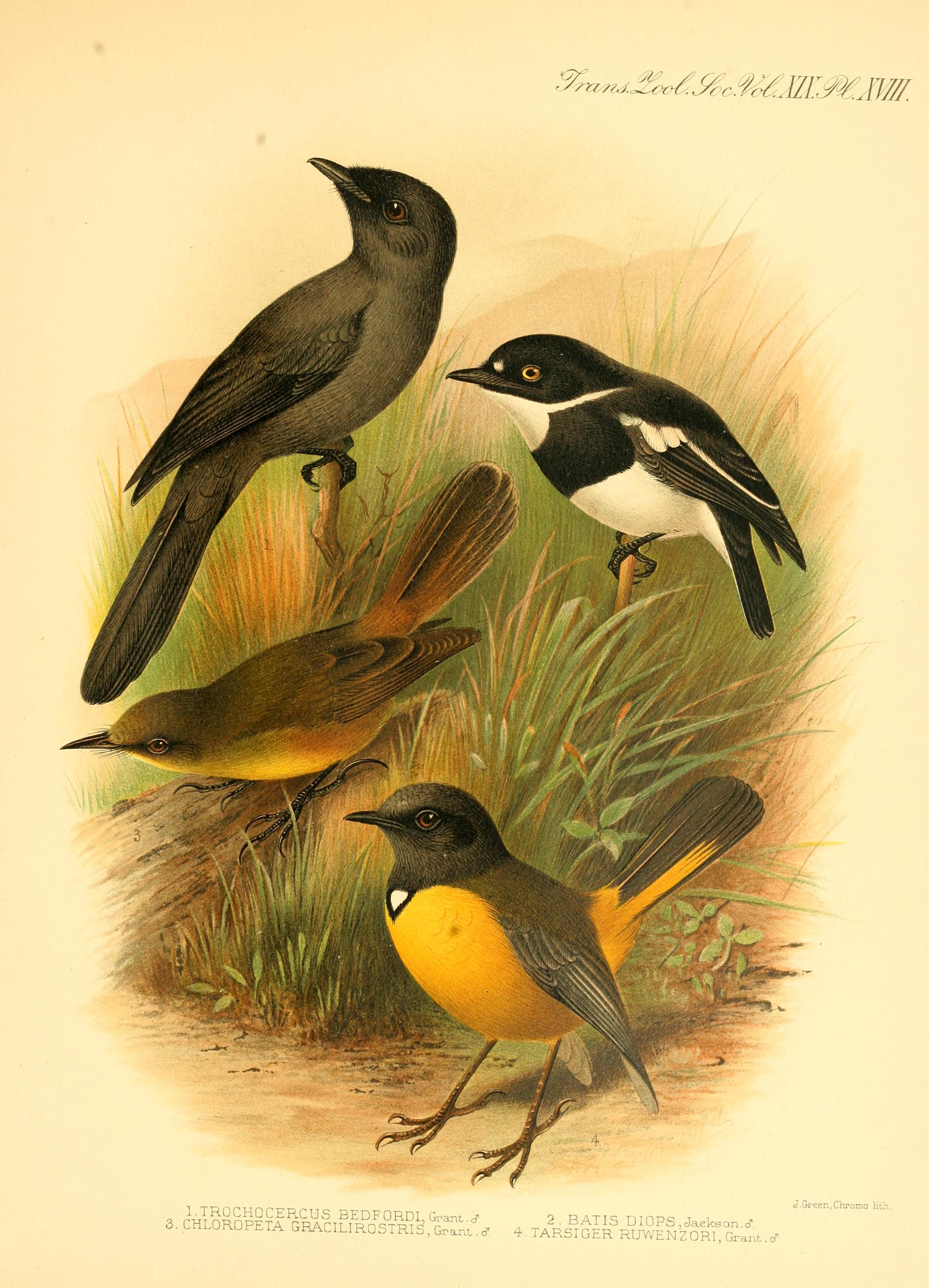
- Papyrus yellow warbler (centre left)

Conservation status
- Vulnerable (IUCN 3.1)

Scientific classification
- Kingdom: Animalia
- Phylum: Chordata
- Class: Aves
- Order: Passeriformes
- Family: Acrocephalidae
- Genus: Calamonastides; Grant, CHB & Mackworth-Praed, 1940
- Species: C. gracilirostris

Binomial name
- Calamonastides gracilirostris (Ogilvie-Grant, 1906)

Subspecies
- C. g. gracilirostris - (Ogilvie-Grant, 1906); C. g. bensoni - (Amadon, 1954)
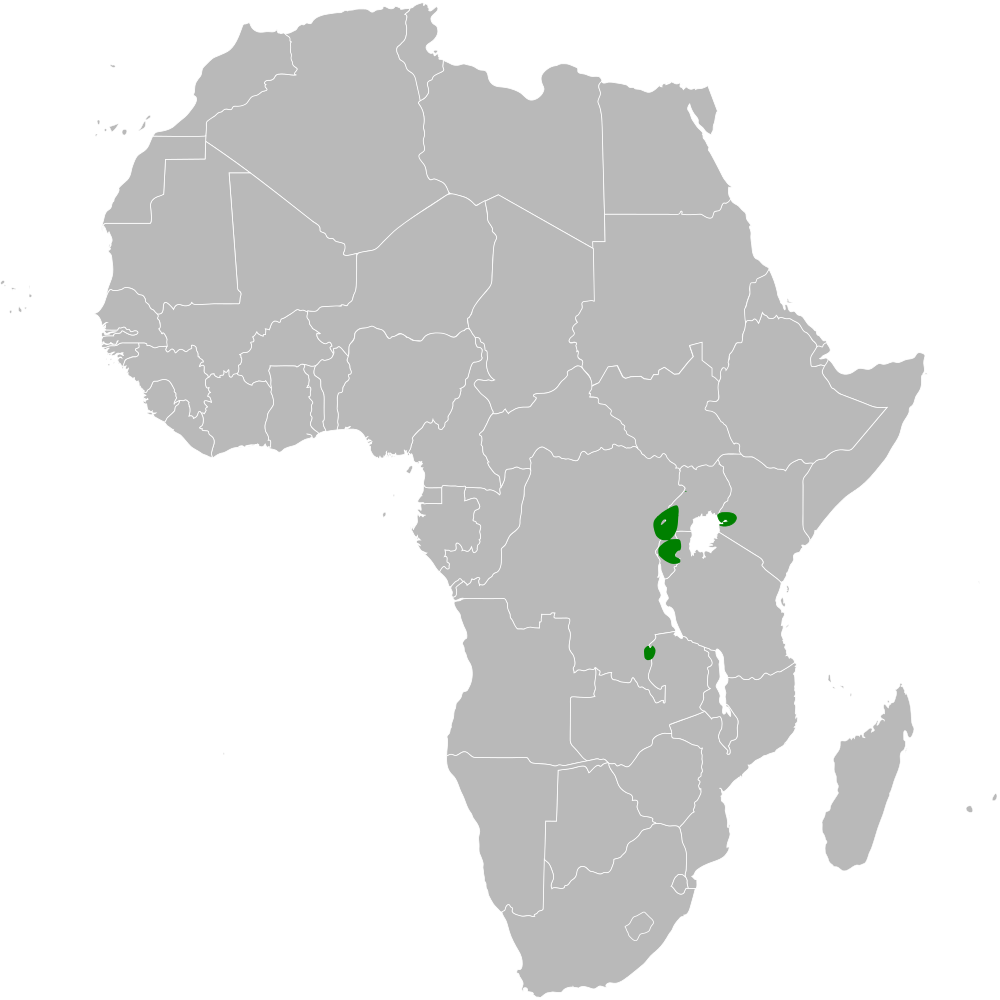
- Resident range

Synonyms
- Chloropeta gracilirostris

= Papyrus yellow warbler =

Species of bird

The papyrus yellow warbler, papyrus flycatcher-warbler or thin-billed flycatcher-warbler (Calamonastides gracilirostris) is a species of tree warbler; formerly, these were placed in the paraphyletic "Old World warblers". It is monotypic in its genus. It is found in Burundi, Democratic Republic of the Congo, Kenya, Rwanda, Tanzania, Uganda, and Zambia. Its natural habitat is swamps. It is threatened by habitat loss.

== Description ==
Compared with the dull browns and greys typical of swamp-dwelling warblers, this warbler is brightly coloured. It shows an underbelly of rich yellow and olive-brown upper parts. Its song consists of melodious liquid warbling.
