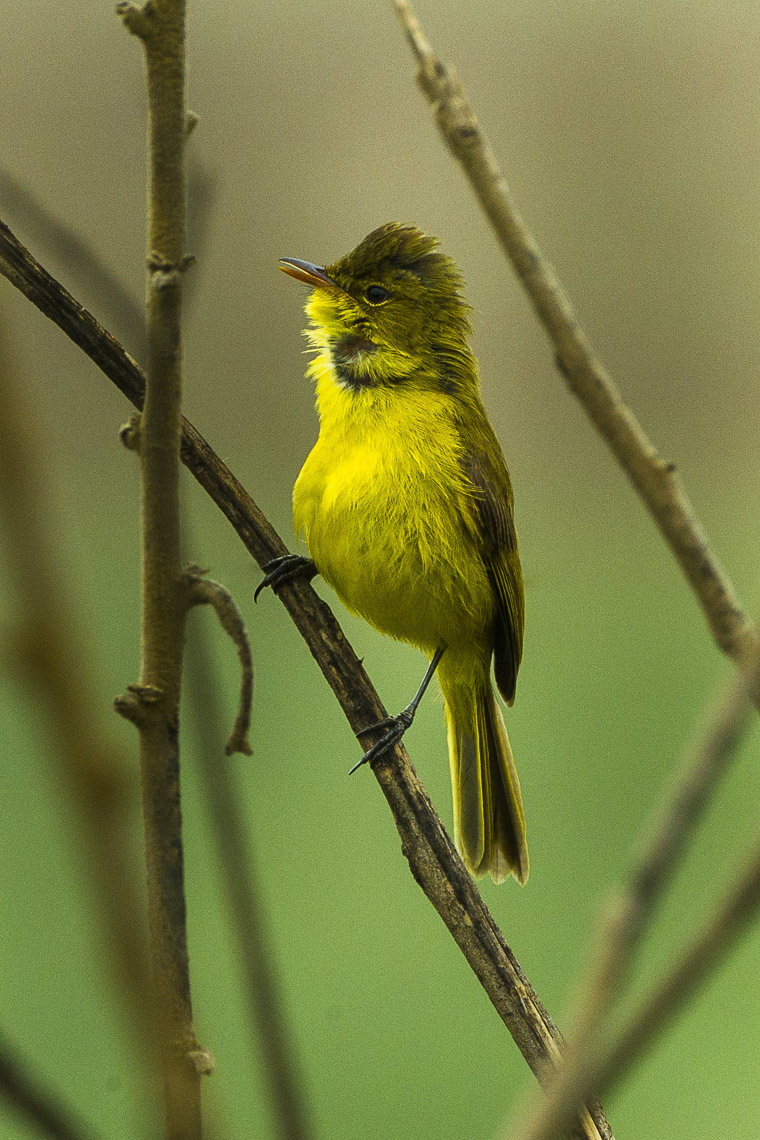
- In South Africa

Conservation status
- Least Concern (IUCN 3.1)

Scientific classification
- Kingdom: Animalia
- Phylum: Chordata
- Class: Aves
- Order: Passeriformes
- Family: Acrocephalidae
- Genus: Iduna
- Species: I. natalensis

Binomial name
- Iduna natalensis (A. Smith, 1847)
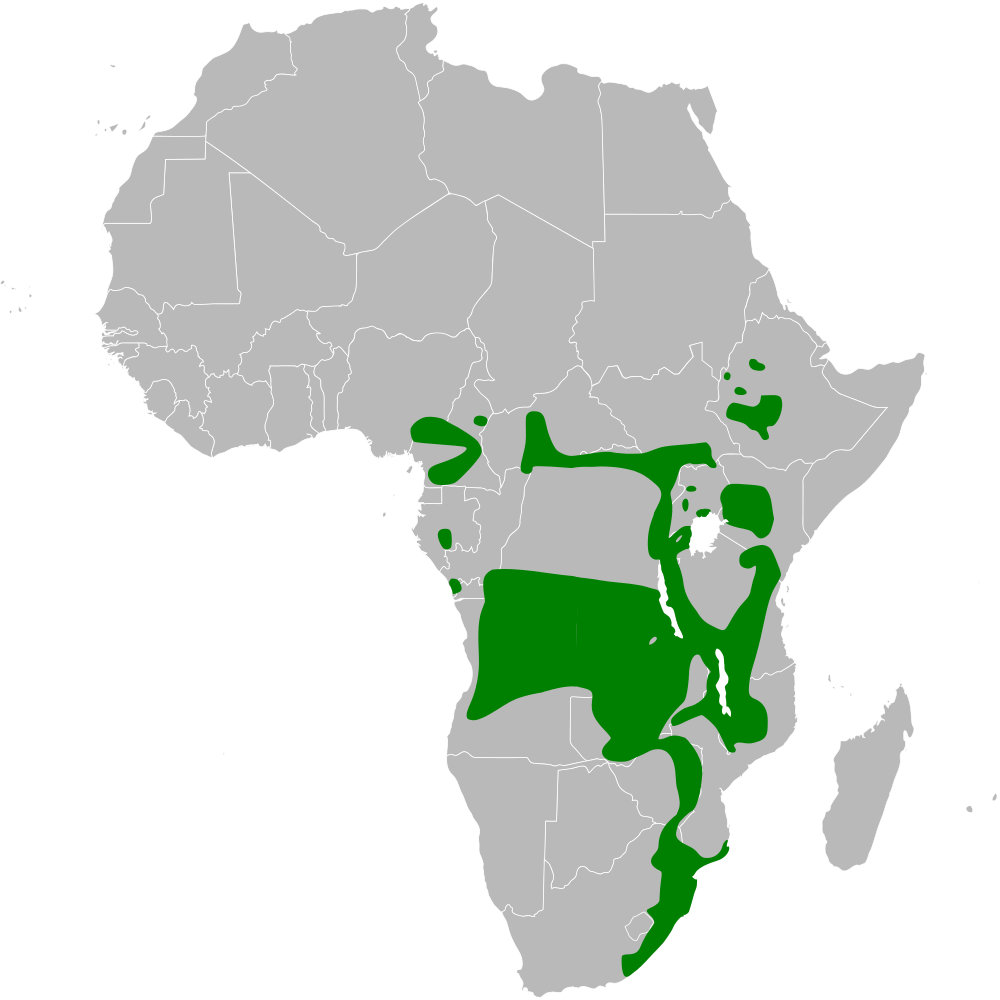
- Resident range

Synonyms
- Chloropeta natalensis

= African yellow warbler =

Species of bird

The African yellow warbler (Iduna natalensis), also known as Natal yellow warbler, dark-capped yellow warbler or yellow flycatcher-warbler, is a species of Acrocephalidae warblers; formerly, these were placed in the paraphyletic "Old World warblers".

== Description ==
The African yellow warbler is a medium-sized warbler in which the whole of the upperparts and tail are yellowish-brown, with a slightly browner crown and yellower rump. The wings have brown feathers edged with yellow. The underparts are bright yellow with an olive wash on the sides of the breast, flanks and lower belly. The bill is pale on the upper mandible and blackish on the lower, and the legs are blackish. Females have duller underparts, and the juveniles are similar to the males but are buffier. The total length is 13 cm (5.1 in) and the birds weigh between 10 and 15 g (0.35 and 0.53 oz).

=== Voice ===
The song of the African yellow warbler is a rapid series of throaty and varied notes preceded by a few raspy notes, for example, "chip-chip-chip- whee-lee-wheeo". The alarm call is a sharp "tsk" or "chirr".

== Habitat ==
The African yellow warbler is a bird of rank vegetation and occurs in reeds, overgrown waterside vegetation and forest edges, especially where these are integrated with wetter vegetation.

== Habits ==
The African yellow warbler forages low in the vegetation, either singly or in pairs. It can be rather secretive but it will climb up to an exposed perch to sing but will dive into cover and creep away in a mouse-like fashion if disturbed. It gleans much of its prey such as caterpillars from leaves and branches but it also hawks termite alates, sallying into the air from a perch to which it returns to feed on any prey caught.

The nest is a neat cup made of grass, typically situated in the fork of branches within a bush or between upright stems. In southern Africa typical species nested in include Leonotis, Conyza and Epilobium. The 2 or 3 eggs are laid from September to March in southern Africa. The clutch is incubated for around 12 days, the female being responsible for most of the incubation. After hatching the chicks are fed by both parents, although the female feeds them much more than the male; the chicks fledge at around two weeks old and become independent at about 6 weeks old.

== Taxonomy, subspecies and distribution ==
This species was originally placed in the genus Chloropeta alongside the mountain yellow warbler but molecular studies have shown that it is closely related to the clade of palearctic bush warblers that were formerly in the genus Hippolais and also the previously incertae sedis thick-billed warbler.

=== Subspecies and their distribution ===
There are currently four recognised subspecies and they and their distribution are set out below:

- Iduna natalensis batesi (Sharpe, 1905): Nigeria east to northern Democratic Republic of Congo and western South Sudan.
- Iduna natalensis massaica (G. A. Fischer & Reichenow, 1884): western and southern Ethiopia, eastern South Sudan, north-eastern Democratic Republic of Congo, Uganda, western and southern Kenya and north-western and north-eastern Tanzania.
- Iduna natalensis major (E. J. O. Hartert, 1904) – Gabon east to southern Democratic Republic of Congo (east to Maniema and south to Katanga), south to Angola (as far south as Benguela, northern Huíla and southern Lunda Sul) and northern Zambia.
- Iduna natalensis natalensis (A. Smith, 1847): southern Tanzania, Malawi, southern Zambia, northern and eastern Zimbabwe, north-western & western Mozambique, eastern South Africa from the east of Limpopo south to the central Eastern Cape, and Eswatini.
