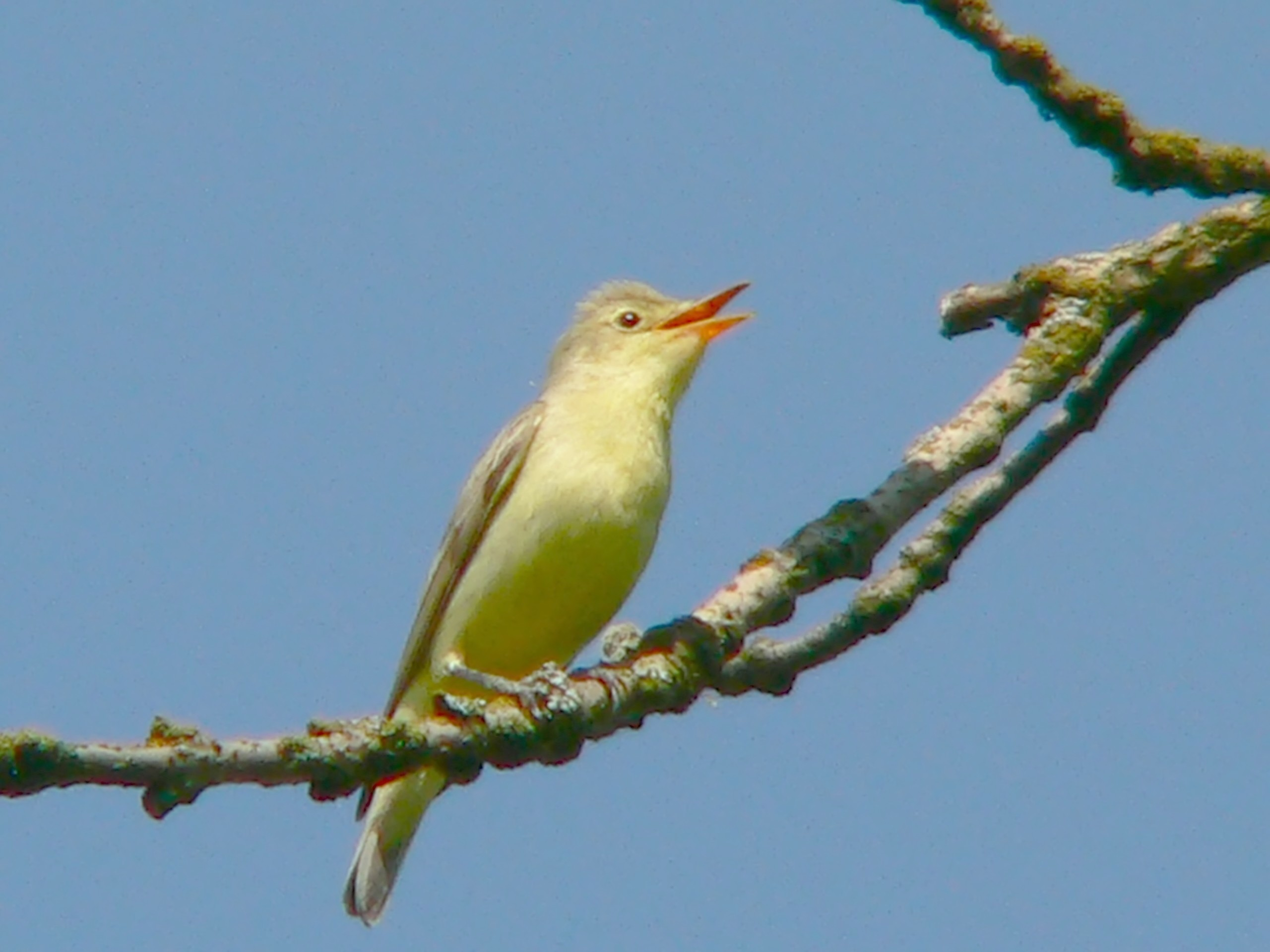
- Icterine warbler (Hippolais icterina)

Scientific classification
- Kingdom: Animalia
- Phylum: Chordata
- Class: Aves
- Order: Passeriformes
- Family: Acrocephalidae
- Genus: Hippolais von Baldenstein, 1827

Type species
- Hippolais italica Conrad, 1827

= Hippolais =

Genus of birds

Hippolais is a genus of tree warbler in the family Acrocephalidae. It is sometimes associated with the genus Iduna. The genus name Hippolais is from Ancient Greek hupolais, as misspelt by Linnaeus. It referred to a small bird mentioned by Aristotle and others and may be onomatopoeic or derived from hupo,"under", and laas, "stone".

== Species ==
It contains the following species:

Image	Common name	Scientific name	Distribution
	Upcher's warbler	Hippolais languida	Breeds in an area from Turkey south and east to Pakistan; winters in eastern Africa, from Eritrea and Somalia south to Tanzania.
	Olive-tree warbler	Hippolais olivetorum	Breeds in southeast Europe and the Near East; winters in eastern and southern Africa, from Kenya south to South Africa.
	Melodious warbler	Hippolais polyglotta	western Europe and north Africa, and overwinters in west Africa south of the Sahara Desert.
	Icterine warbler	Hippolais icterina	northern France and Norway through most of northern and eastern Europe, south as far as the northern Balkan mountains and the Crimean peninsula; winters in Africa south of the Sahara.
