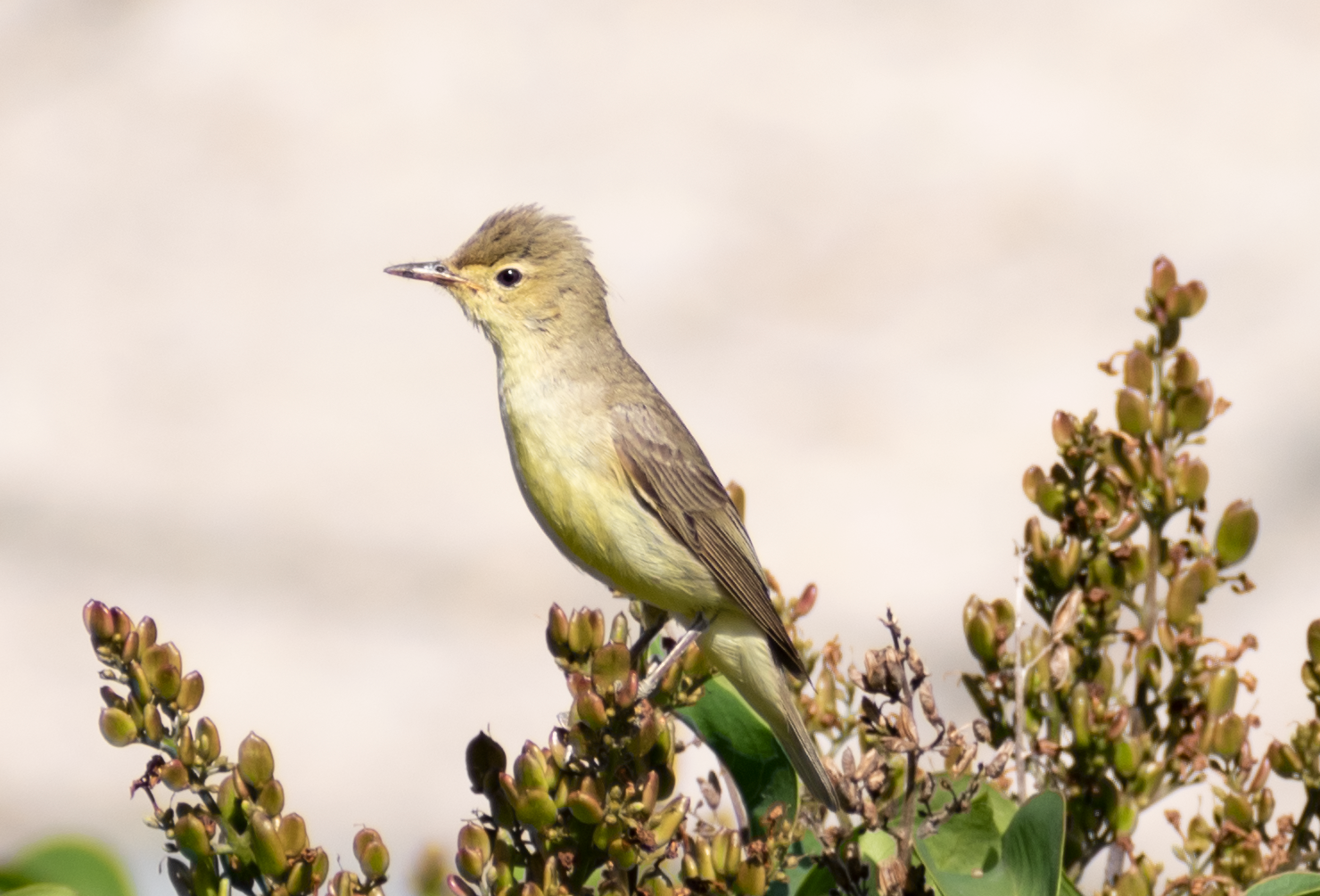
- In Czech Republic

Conservation status
- Least Concern (IUCN 3.1)

Scientific classification
- Kingdom: Animalia
- Phylum: Chordata
- Class: Aves
- Order: Passeriformes
- Family: Acrocephalidae
- Genus: Hippolais
- Species: H. icterina

Binomial name
- Hippolais icterina (Vieillot, 1817)
- Range of Icterine Warbler Breeding Passage Non-breeding

Audio

= Icterine warbler =

Species of bird

The icterine warbler (Hippolais icterina) is an Old World warbler in the tree warbler genus Hippolais. It breeds in mainland Europe except the southwest, where it is replaced by its western counterpart, the melodious warbler. It is migratory, wintering in sub-Saharan Africa.

== Description ==
A fairly big warbler with a large head, broad-based bill and long wings with a quite short square-ended tail. The upperparts are greyish-green and the underparts are uniformly light yellow. It has pale lores and a rather vague yellowish supercilium with a pale eye ring. Other distinguishing features include a panel on the folded wings formed by pale edges to the secondary feathers and tertiary feathers and the grey, sometimes bluish legs.

== Habitat ==
The icterine warbler is a bird of woodland rather than forest, preferring woodland edge or glades, favouring the crowns of well-spaced trees with tall undergrowth. It prefers broad-leafed trees, but may be found in conifers mixed with broad-leafed trees. It will use copses, orchards, parks, gardens, shelterbelts and tall hedges interspersed with trees.

== Voice ==
The song is a fast nasal babbling incorporating mimicry of other species. The call is described as teck or tec, tec, tec.

== Distribution and movements ==
The icterine warbler has the most northerly and widespread distribution of the four Hippolais species; its breeding range extends from northern France and Norway through most of northern and eastern Europe, south as far as the northern Balkans mountains and Crimea mountains eastwards in a narrowing band to the River Ob. It has bred in Scotland but it is normally a passage migrant in Great Britain and Ireland. There is a 2022 record of the icterine warbler from Gambell, Alaska, and it was also documented in the state the following year.

It is a migratory species and the entire population winters in sub-Saharan Africa, mainly south of the equator. It begins its southward migration from late July, peaking in early August and then returns to the breeding range in late May.

== Biology ==
The icterine warbler is mainly insectivorous but will feed on fruit in late summer. It forages among the foliage taking insects either on the leaves or fluttering, and it will flycatch. In general it is clumsier than the smaller but superficially similar Phylloscopus warblers. Rather solitary, it is territorial on both the breeding and wintering grounds. Four to six eggs are laid in a nest in a tree or a bush.

== Etymology ==
The genus name Hippolais is from Ancient Greek hupolais, as misspelt by Linnaeus. It referred to a small bird mentioned by Aristotle and others and may be onomatopoeic or derived from hupo,"under", and laas, "stone". The specific icterina is Greek for "jaundice-yellow". Icterus was an old word for jaundice, and also referred to a yellowish-green bird, perhaps the golden oriole, the sight of which was believed to cure the disease. It is colloquially referred to by birders as icky.

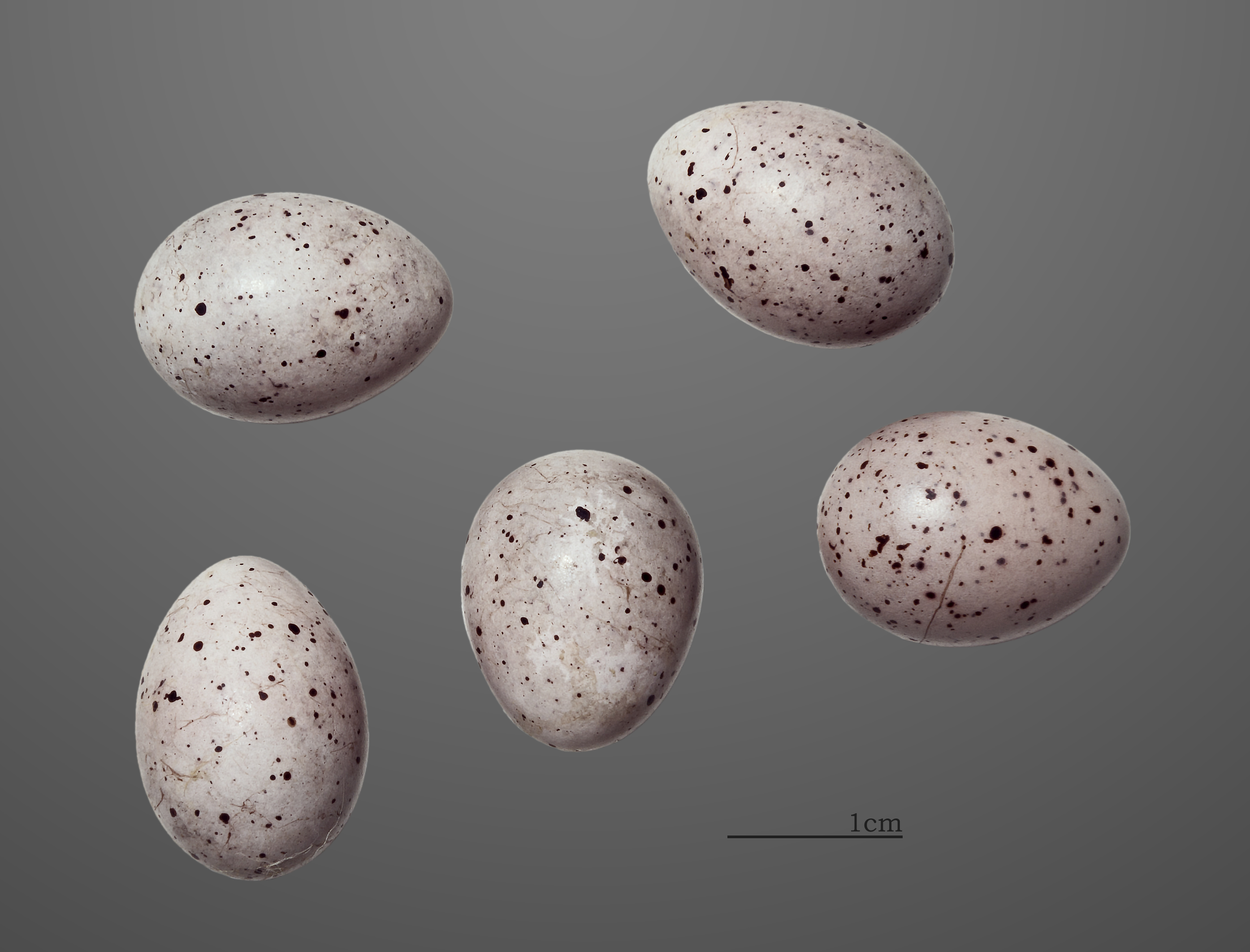
Eggs of icterine warbler MHNT

The scientific name was also spelt as Hypolais icterina.
