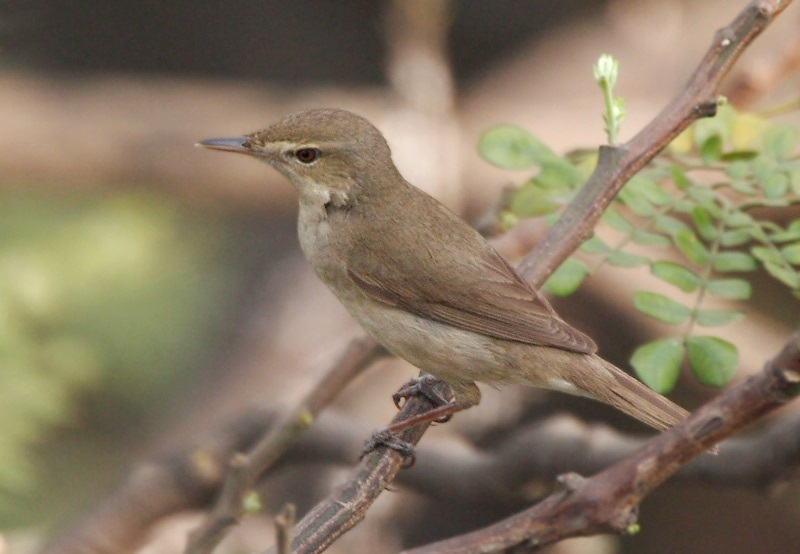
- Sykes's warbler (Iduna rama)

Scientific classification
- Kingdom: Animalia
- Phylum: Chordata
- Class: Aves
- Order: Passeriformes
- Family: Acrocephalidae
- Genus: Iduna; Keyserling & Blasius, JH, 1840

Type species
- Sylvia caligata M.H.C. Lichtenstein, 1823

= Iduna (bird) =

Genus of birds

Iduna is a genus of tree warbler in the family Acrocephalidae. Keyserling and Blasius gave no explanation of the genus name Iduna. It is sometimes lumped in the genus Hippolais, although in 2009 it was found to belong to the Iduna clade.

It contains the following six species:

Image	Common name	Scientific name	Distribution
	African yellow warbler	Iduna natalensis	Sub-Saharan Africa, from Nigeria east to South Sudan and south through Central and East Africa to Zambia, Malawi, Zimbabwe, Mozambique, eastern South Africa, and Eswatini.
	Mountain yellow warbler	Iduna similis	Albertine rift and East African montane forests, Imatong and Eastern Arc mountains.
	Booted warbler	Iduna caligata	Breeds from central Russia to western China, wintering in the Indian subcontinent as far south as Sri Lanka; range has expanded westward to as far as Finland.
	Sykes's warbler	Iduna rama	Breeds from northeast Arabia to Turkestan, west China and Afghanistan; winters in the Indian subcontinent as far south as Sri Lanka.
	Eastern olivaceous warbler	Iduna pallida	Breeds in southeastern Europe, the Middle East and adjacent western Asia; winters in the northern Afrotropics.
	Western olivaceous warbler	Iduna opaca	Breeds in Iberia and north Africa; winters in sub-Saharan Africa.
