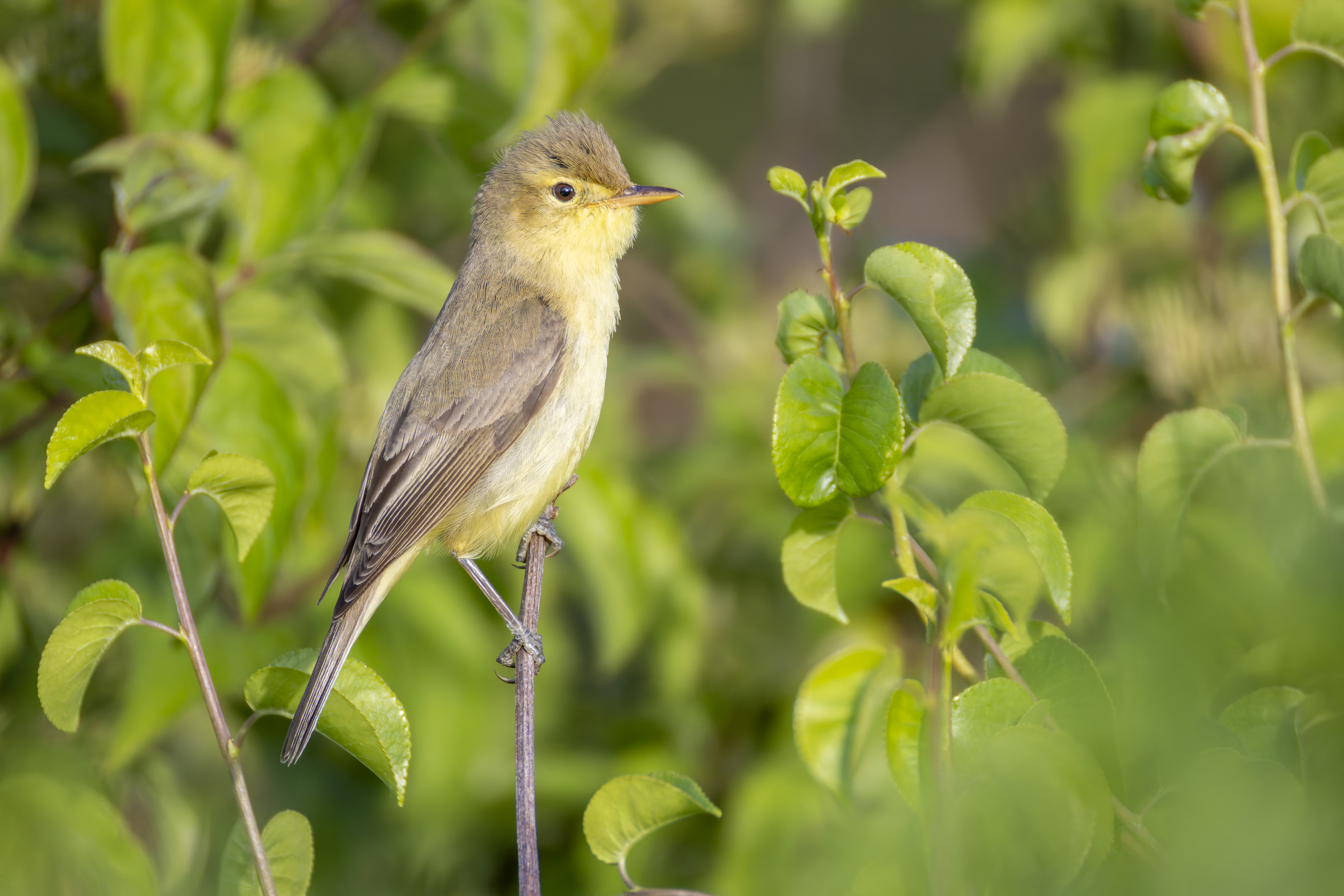

Conservation status
- Least Concern (IUCN 3.1)

Scientific classification
- Kingdom: Animalia
- Phylum: Chordata
- Class: Aves
- Order: Passeriformes
- Family: Acrocephalidae
- Genus: Hippolais
- Species: H. polyglotta

Binomial name
- Hippolais polyglotta (Vieillot, 1817)
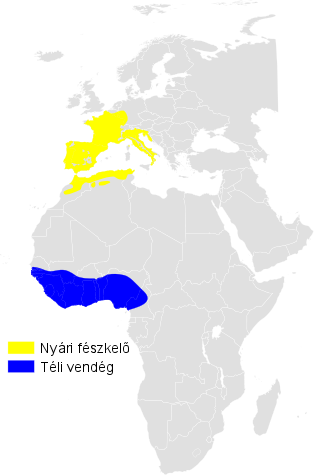
- Distribution of Melodious Warbler Summer resident (Breeding) Winter visitor

Audio
- Song recorded in the Netherlands

= Melodious warbler =

Species of bird

The melodious warbler (Hippolais polyglotta) is an Old World warbler in the tree warbler genus Hippolais. It breeds in southwest Europe and northwest Africa. It is migratory, wintering in sub-Saharan Africa. This small passerine bird is a species found in open woodland with bushes. Three to five eggs are laid in a nest in a tree or a bush. This is a common bird in many parts of its wide range and the International Union for Conservation of Nature has rated its conservation status as being of "least concern".

== Etymology ==
The genus name Hippolais is from Ancient Greek hupolais, as misspelt by Linnaeus. It referred to a small bird mentioned by Aristotle and others and may be onomatopoeic or derived from hupo,"under", and laas, "stone". The specific polyglotta is from Ancient Greek polus, "many", and glossa, "tongue" and means "harmonious".

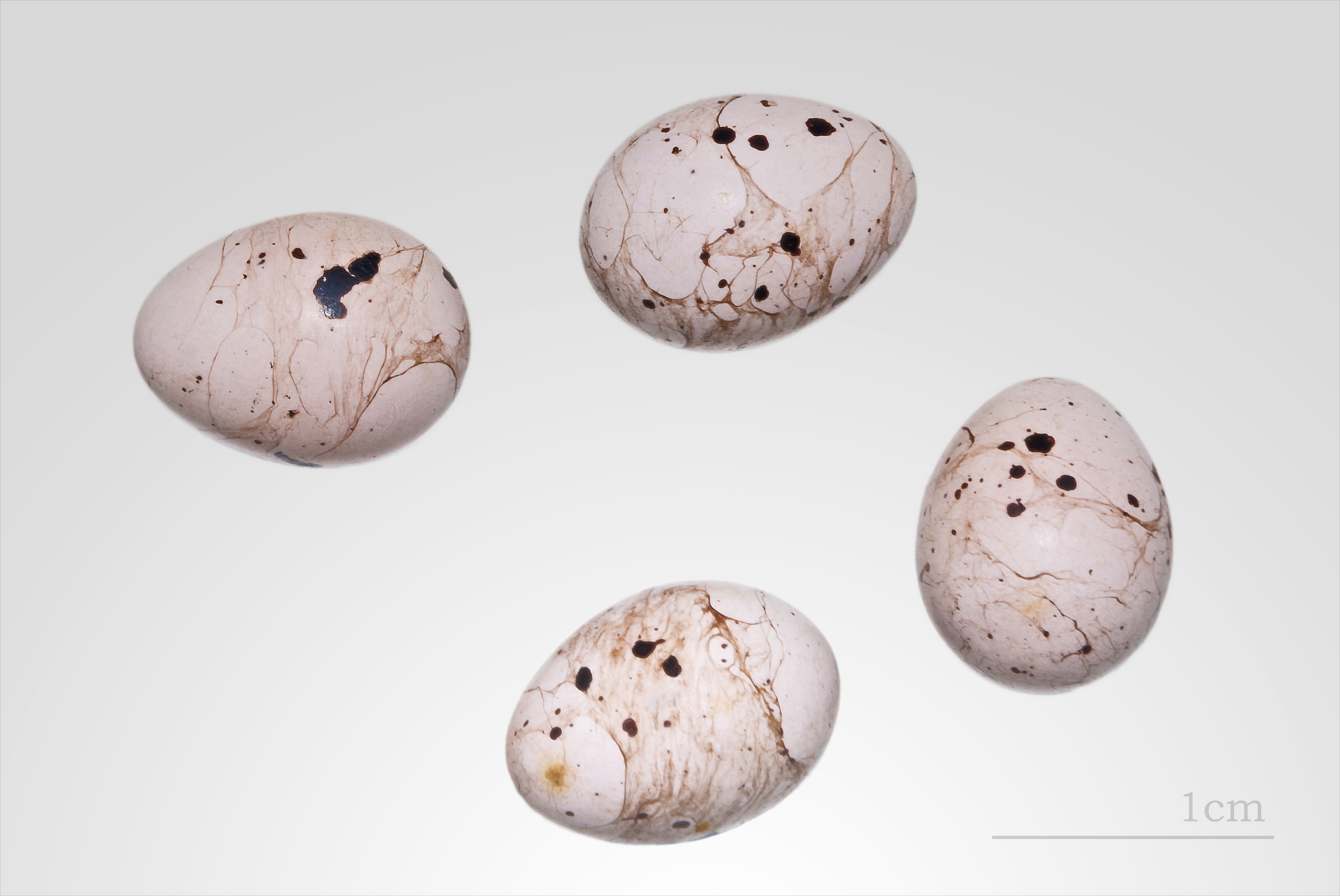
Eggs of Hippolais polyglotta MHNT

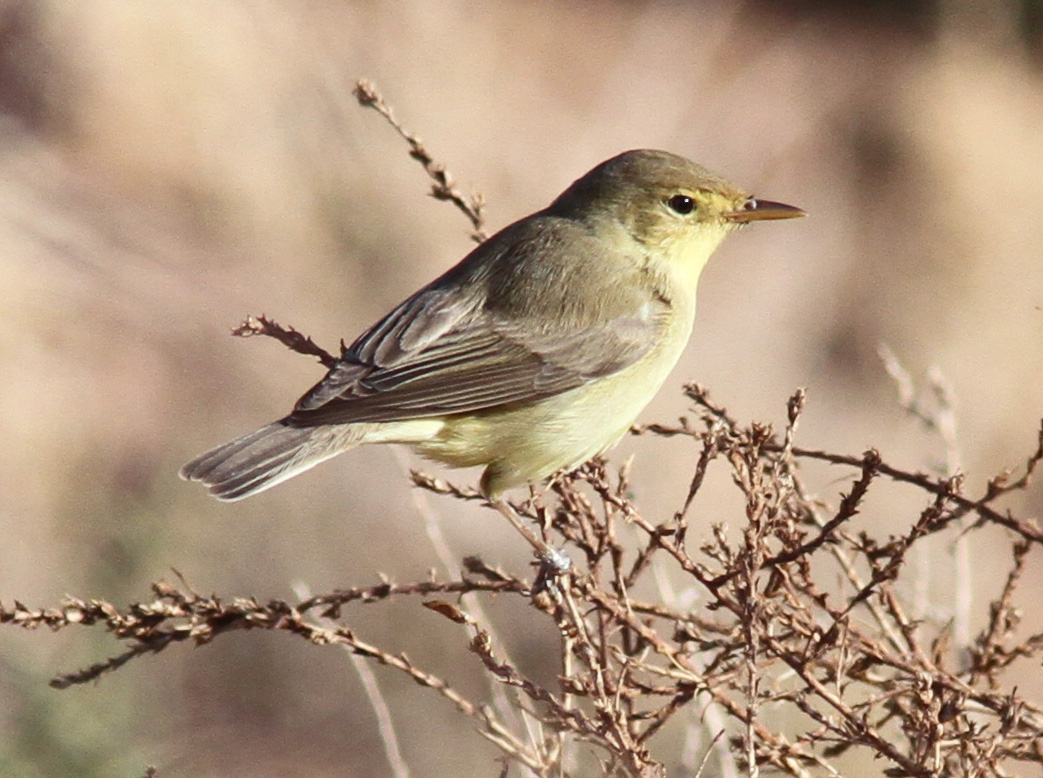
Melodious warbler near Ouarzazate, Morocco

== Description ==
This is a medium-sized warbler, 12 to 13 cm (4.7 to 5.1 in) in length, and similar to its eastern counterpart, the icterine warbler (Hippolais icterina). The adult has a plain brown back and wings, and yellowish underparts. Compared to the icterine warbler, the upper parts are rather browner and the under parts rather yellower. The bill is strong and pointed and the legs are brown. The sexes are identical, as with most warblers, but young birds are paler on the belly. The song is a pleasant babbling. Compared to that of the icterine it is more fluent and sustained but much less varied, and it does not include mimicked sounds. Other vocalisations include a rattling "trrrr", which resembles a house sparrow, a quiet "tuk" and a chattering "chret-chet".

== Distribution and habitat ==
The melodious warbler is a migratory species. It breeds in Western Europe and North Africa, and overwinters in West Africa south of the Sahara Desert. The breeding range extends from the Iberian Peninsula eastwards to Germany and Italy. In northern Africa it breeds in Western Sahara, Mauritania, Algeria, Morocco and Tunisia. Its typical habitats include bushy woodland, forest edges, thickets, riverside vegetation, orchards and gardens.

== Ecology ==
Like most warblers, it is mainly insectivorous, but will take other small food items, including berries. Three to five eggs are laid in a nest composed of fine grasses, stems, soft twigs, flakes of bark and lichen.
