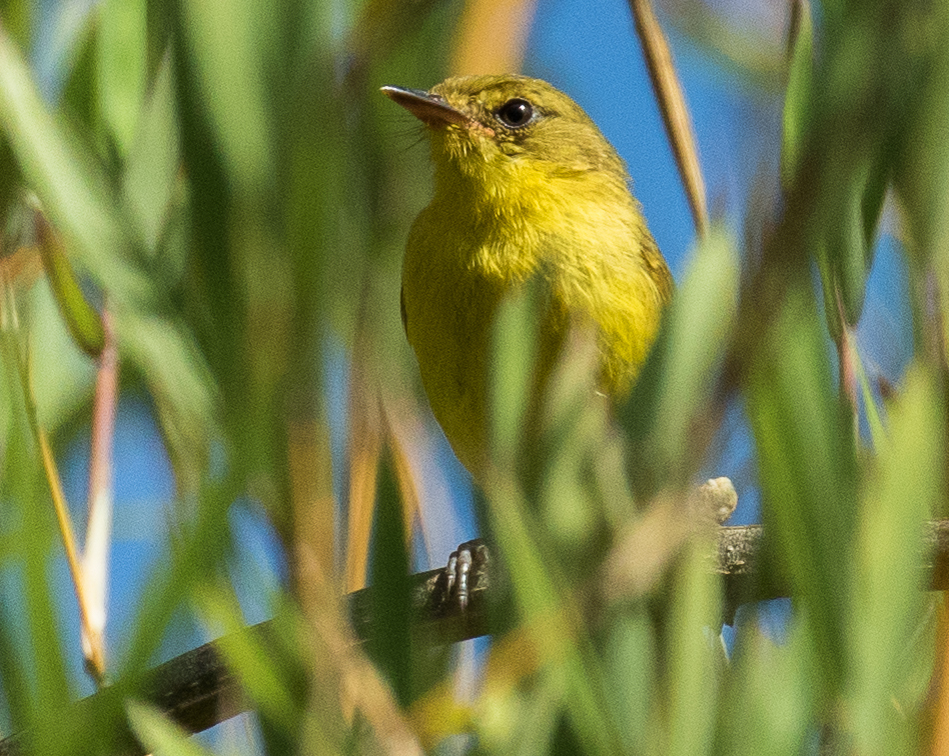
- In Kenya

Conservation status
- Least Concern (IUCN 3.1)

Scientific classification
- Kingdom: Animalia
- Phylum: Chordata
- Class: Aves
- Order: Passeriformes
- Family: Acrocephalidae
- Genus: Iduna
- Species: I. similis

Binomial name
- Iduna similis (Richmond, 1897)
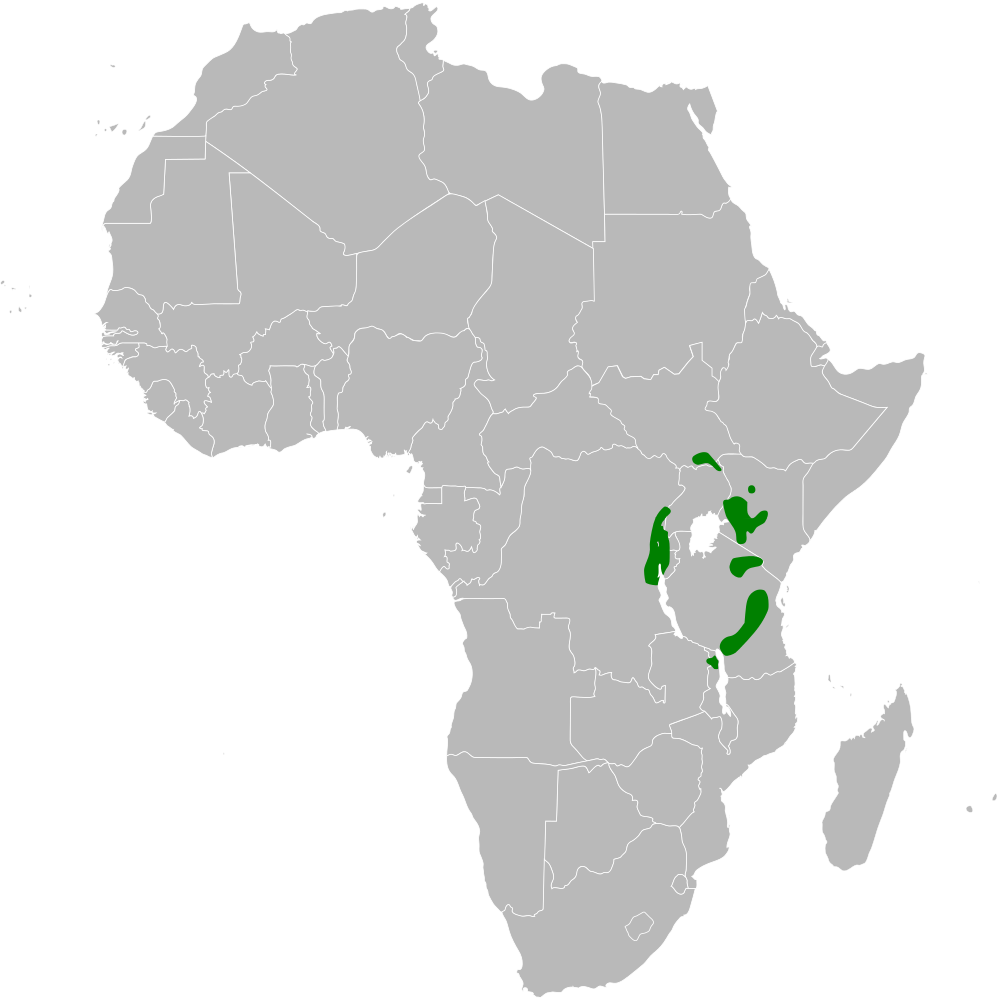
- Resident range

Synonyms
- Chloropeta similis

= Mountain yellow warbler =

Species of bird

The Mountain yellow warbler (Iduna similis) is a medium sized bird with a mix of olive and yellow coloration. This bird is native to the eastern Afromontane. It normally feeds on flies but sometimes on remaining crops from harvests. An easy way to recognize this bird is with its whistle-tone vocalizations. The Mountain yellow warbler has a conservation status of Least Concern. This bird is a species of Acrocephalidae warbler; formerly, these were placed in the paraphyletic "Old World warblers".

== Description ==
This is a medium-sized bird with an olive and yellow coloration throughout the plumage. The head and back of the bird are olive-green in color, while the stomach is vibrant yellow. This bird's bill is very short and dark brown. The adult male and female are very similar in looks while the adolescent is browner and a paler yellow color. This bird is known for being very territorial.

== Habitat and Distribution ==
The Mountain Yellow Warbler is native to the Albertine rift and East African montane forests, Imatong and Eastern Arc mountains.

Its natural habitats are subtropical or tropical moist montane forests and subtropical or tropical moist shrubland. Common areas where this bird may be spotted are in places of vegetation or within bushes found along swampy valleys. The Mountain Yellow Warbler is known to be in high altitudes of the forest areas. This bird's movement tends to be sedentary where they will stay in a place for an extended period of time.

== Diet ==
The Mountain Yellow Warbler feeds on flies mostly but is also found to gather crops that have been left over from the main harvest. They search for their food on ground level, in bushes, and directly on the ground. Occasionally they can be found 20 meters high in the treetops searching for food.

== Vocalizations ==
The Mountain Yellow Warblers sounds are composed of a variety of medleys featuring pleasant whistles. Their sounds are short in duration, lasting only about 4-7 seconds long. The different medleys are frequently repeated in a series, separated by short gaps. Their call can be depicted by the short sounds of "cha-cha-cha".

== Nesting and Reproduction ==
These birds build create large nests that sit above ground in a fork in a low shrub or bush. Their cup shaped nests have sturdy walls made of grass blades and seedheads. Their nest is constructed of feathers, ferns, and moss, and it is cobweb-bound. They line their nests with feathers, hair, and plant fibers.

In mainly rainy seasons, these birds lay their eggs in different months based on the different areas of Africa; April to October in S Sudan, Apr–Jun and Oct in DR Congo, Jul–Aug and Nov in W Kenya, Sept and Dec in Tanzania, and Dec–Feb in Zambia-Malawi. Incubation is done by females and lasts 12-14 days. The young are fed by both the parents, then leave the nest 10-11 days after hatching from their egg.

== Conservation status ==
The Mountain Yellow Warbler is not a globally threatened species. They are distributed locally in a fragmented range in and around East Africa's highlands. They are reasonably adaptive to their surroundings and can thrive in secondary habitats because they are found to not be dependent on forests.
