= Index of Northern Mariana Islands–related articles =

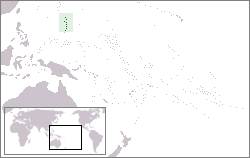
The location of the Northern Mariana Islands in the western North Pacific Ocean

The following is an alphabetical list of articles related to the Commonwealth of the Northern Mariana Islands.

== 0–9 ==
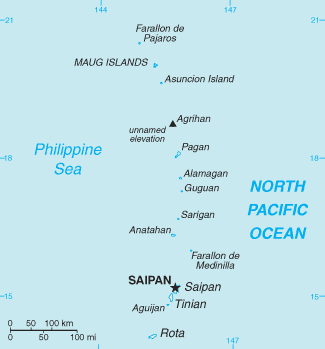
An enlargeable map of the Commonwealth of the Northern Mariana Islands

- .mp – Internet country code top-level domain for the Commonwealth of the Northern Mariana Islands

== A ==
- Agrihan Island
- Aguijan
- Airports in the Northern Mariana Islands
- Anatahan Island
- Area code 670
- Asuncion Island
- Atlas of the Northern Mariana Islands

== B ==
- Battle of Saipan
- Battle of Tinian
- Birds of the Northern Mariana Islands

== C ==
- Capital of the Northern Mariana Islands
- Chamorro people
  - Category:Chamorro
    - commons:Category:Chamorro
- Cities in the Northern Mariana Islands
- Colleges and universities in the Northern Mariana Islands
  - commons:Category:Universities and colleges in the Northern Mariana Islands
- Commonwealth of the Northern Mariana Islands website
  - Constitution of the Commonwealth of the Northern Mariana Islands
  - Government of the Commonwealth of the Northern Mariana Islands
    - Category:Government of the Northern Mariana Islands
      - commons:Category:Government of the Northern Mariana Islands
  - Supreme Court of the Commonwealth of the Northern Mariana Islands
- Commonwealth of the Northern Mariana Islands Public School System
- Communications on the Northern Mariana Islands
- Constitution of the Commonwealth of the Northern Mariana Islands

== D ==
- Demographics of the Northern Mariana Islands
  - commons:Category:Demographics of the Northern Mariana Islands
- Department of Public Safety, Commonwealth of the Northern Mariana Islands

== E ==
- Economy of the Northern Mariana Islands
  - Category:Economy of the Northern Mariana Islands
- Education in the Northern Mariana Islands
- Elections in the Northern Mariana Islands
  - Category:Elections in the Northern Mariana Islands
- Environment of the Northern Mariana Islands

== F ==
The Flag of the Northern Mariana Islands

- Farallon de Medinilla
- Farallon de Pajaros
- Flag of the Northern Mariana Islands
- Freedom Tower Silver Dollar

== G ==
- Garapan
- Geography of the Northern Mariana Islands
  - commons:Category:Geography of the Northern Mariana Islands
- Government of the Commonwealth of the Northern Mariana Islands website
- Governor of the Commonwealth of the Northern Mariana Islands
  - List of governors of the Northern Mariana Islands
- Guam
- Guguan

== H ==
- Higher education in the Northern Mariana Islands
- History of the Northern Mariana Islands
  - Historical outline of the Northern Mariana Islands
    - Category:History of the Northern Mariana Islands
      - commons:Category:History of the Northern Mariana Islands

== I ==
- Images of the Northern Mariana Islands
- Islands of the Northern Mariana Islands
  - Agrihan Island
  - Anatahan Island
  - Asuncion Island
  - Farallon de Medinilla
  - Farallon de Pajaros
  - Guguan
  - Maug Islands
  - Pagan Island
  - Rota
  - Saipan
  - Sarigan Island
  - Tinian
- Izu–Bonin–Mariana Arc

== L ==
- Law enforcement in the Northern Mariana Islands
- Lists related to the Northern Mariana Islands:
  - List of airports in the Northern Mariana Islands
  - List of birds of the Northern Mariana Islands
  - List of cities in the Northern Mariana Islands
  - List of colleges and universities in the Northern Mariana Islands
  - List of islands of the Northern Mariana Islands
  - List of newspapers in Northern Mariana Islands
  - List of political parties in the Northern Mariana Islands
  - List of radio stations in the Northern Mariana Islands
  - List of Registered Historic Places in the Northern Mariana Islands
  - List of Superfund sites in the Northern Mariana Islands
  - List of villages in the Northern Mariana Islands
  - List of wettest known tropical cyclones in the Northern Mariana Islands

== M ==
- Mariana Islands
- Mariana Trench
- Mariana Trough
- Maritime Heritage Trail – Battle of Saipan
- Maug Islands
- Micronesia
- Micronesia Challenge
- MP – United States Postal Service postal code for the Commonwealth of the Northern Mariana Islands
- Music of the Northern Mariana Islands

== N ==
- Newspapers in the Northern Mariana Islands
- Northern Mariana Islands website
  - Category:Northern Mariana Islands
    - commons:Category:Northern Mariana Islands
      - commons:Category:Maps of Northern Mariana Islands
- Northern Marianas College

== P ==
- Pacific Basin Development Council
- People from the Northern Mariana Islands
- Politics of the Northern Mariana Islands
  - List of political parties in the Northern Mariana Islands
  - Category:Politics of the Northern Mariana Islands
- Public School System of the Commonwealth of the Northern Mariana Islands

== R ==
- Radio stations in the Northern Mariana Islands
- Registered historic places in the Northern Mariana Islands
  - commons:Category:Registered Historic Places in the Northern Mariana Islands
- Religion in the Northern Mariana Islands
- Rota

== S ==
The Seal of the Commonwealth of the Northern Mariana Islands

- Saipan, capital since 1668
- Saipan International Airport
- Sarigan Island
- Scouting in the Northern Mariana Islands
- Seal of the Commonwealth of the Northern Mariana Islands
- Superfund sites in the Northern Mariana Islands
- Susupe

== T ==
- Telephone area code 670
- Tenorio, Pedro A.
- Topic outline of the Northern Mariana Islands
- Tourism in the Northern Mariana Islands website
- Tropical cyclones in the Northern Mariana Islands
  - Category:Typhoons in the Northern Mariana Islands

== U ==
- United Nations Trust Territories
- United States of America
  - Political divisions of the United States
  - United States Court of Appeals for the Ninth Circuit
  - United States District Court for the Northern Mariana Islands
- Universities and colleges in the Northern Mariana Islands
  - commons:Category:Universities and colleges in the Northern Mariana Islands

== V ==
- Villages in the Northern Mariana Islands

== W ==
- Wikimedia
  - Wikimedia Commons Atlas of the Northern Mariana Islands
  - Wikimedia Commons Category:Northern Mariana Islands
    - commons:Category:Maps of the Northern Mariana Islands
  - Wikinews:Category:Northern Mariana Islands
  - Wikipedia Category:Northern Mariana Islands
    - Wikipedia:WikiProject Micronesia/Northern Mariana Islands work group
      - Wikipedia:WikiProject Micronesia/Northern Mariana Islands work group#Recognized content
      - Wikipedia:WikiProject Micronesia/Northern Mariana Islands work group#Participants
    - Wikipedia:WikiProject Topic outline/Drafts/Topic outline of the Northern Mariana Islands

== See also ==
- Topic overview:
  - Northern Mariana Islands
  - Outline of the Northern Mariana Islands
- Carolinian language
- Chamorro language
