= Outline of the Northern Mariana Islands =

Overview of and topical guide to the Northern Mariana Islands

The Flag of the Northern Mariana Islands

The Seal of the Northern Mariana Islands

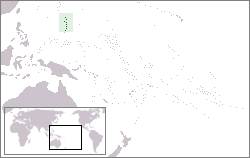
The location of the Northern Mariana Islands

The following outline is provided as an overview of and topical guide to the Northern Mariana Islands:

Commonwealth of the Northern Mariana Islands – island country in the western North Pacific Ocean that maintains a political union with the United States. The Northern Mariana Islands comprise 15 islands about three-quarters of the way from Hawaii to the Philippines, at . The United States Census Bureau reports the total land area of all islands as 179.01 sq mi (463.63 km^{2}).

In 2023, the population is estimated at 51,000.

Previously, the Northern Mariana Islands has a population of 80,362 (2005 estimate). The official 2000 census count was 69,221. The Northern Mariana Islands had the lowest male to female sex ratio in the world: 76 men to every 100 women, due to a large number of female foreign workers, especially in the garment industry. In the early 2000s they began shutting down and by 2009 they were all closed, and the imported workers usually returned home.

== General reference ==
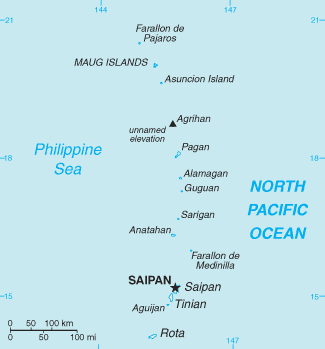
An enlargeable map of the Commonwealth of the Northern Mariana Islands

- Pronunciation:
- Common American Territory name: The Northern Mariana Islands
- Official American Territory name: The Commonwealth of the Northern Mariana Islands
- Common endonym(s):
- Official endonym(s):
- Adjectival(s): Northern Marianan
- Demonym(s):
- Etymology: Name of the Northern Mariana Islands
- ISO country codes: MP, MNP, 580
- ISO region codes: See ISO 3166-2:MP
- Internet country code top-level domain: .mp

== Geography ==
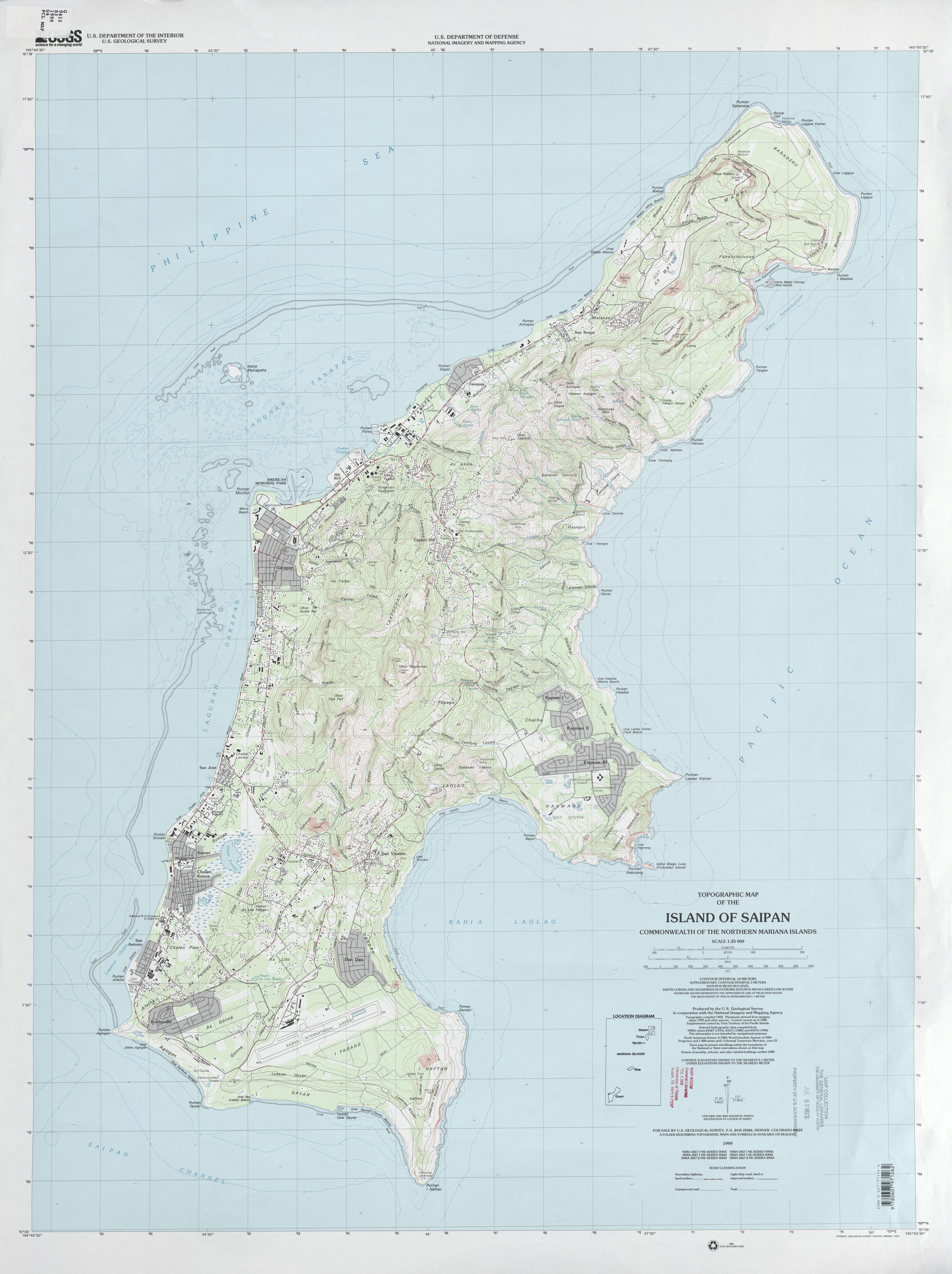
An enlargeable topographic map of the island of Saipan

Geography of the Northern Mariana Islands

- The Northern Mariana Islands are: a U.S. commonwealth
- Location:
  - Southern Hemisphere and Eastern Hemisphere
  - Pacific Ocean
    - North Pacific Ocean
      - Oceania
        - Micronesia
          - Mariana Islands
  - Time zone: Chamorro Standard Time (UTC+10)
  - Extreme points of the Northern Mariana Islands
    - High: unnamed location on Agrihan 965 m (3,166 ft)
    - Low: North Pacific Ocean 0 m
  - Land boundaries: none
  - Coastline: North Pacific Ocean 1,482 km
- Population of the Northern Mariana Islands:
- Area of the Northern Mariana Islands:
- Atlas of the Northern Mariana Islands

=== Environment ===
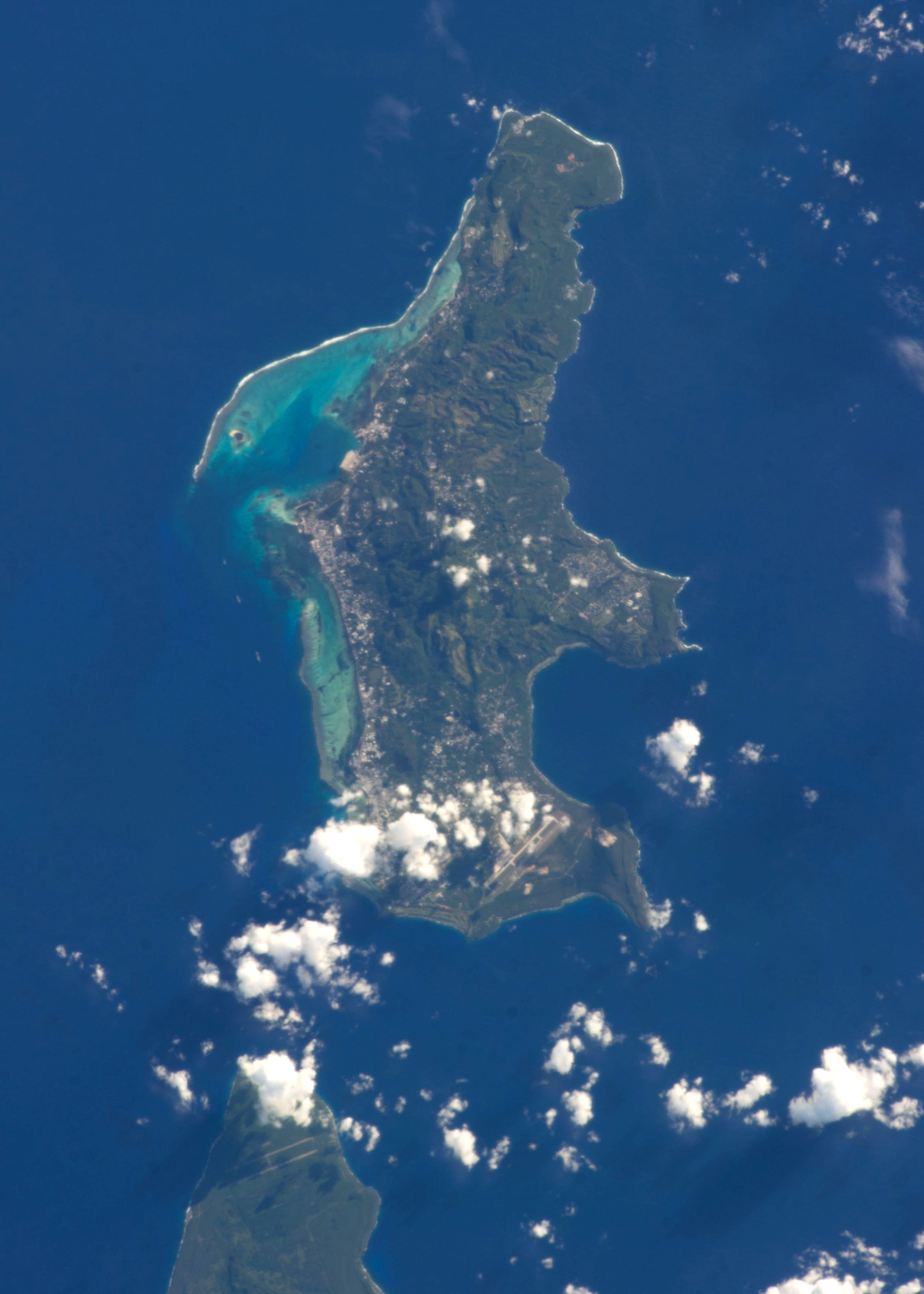
Saipan seen from the International Space Station

- Climate of the Northern Mariana Islands
- Renewable energy in the Northern Mariana Islands
- Geology of the Northern Mariana Islands
- Protected areas of the Northern Mariana Islands
  - Biosphere reserves in the Northern Mariana Islands
  - National parks of the Northern Mariana Islands
- Superfund sites in the Northern Mariana Islands
- Wildlife of the Northern Mariana Islands
  - Fauna of the Northern Mariana Islands
    - Birds of the Northern Mariana Islands
    - Mammals of the Northern Mariana Islands

==== Natural geographic features ====
- Fjords of the Northern Mariana Islands
- Glaciers of the Northern Mariana Islands
- Islands of the Northern Mariana Islands
- Lakes of the Northern Mariana Islands
- Mountains of the Northern Mariana Islands
  - Volcanoes in the Northern Mariana Islands
- Rivers of the Northern Mariana Islands
  - Waterfalls of the Northern Mariana Islands
- Valleys of the Northern Mariana Islands
- World Heritage Sites in the Northern Mariana Islands: None

=== Regions ===
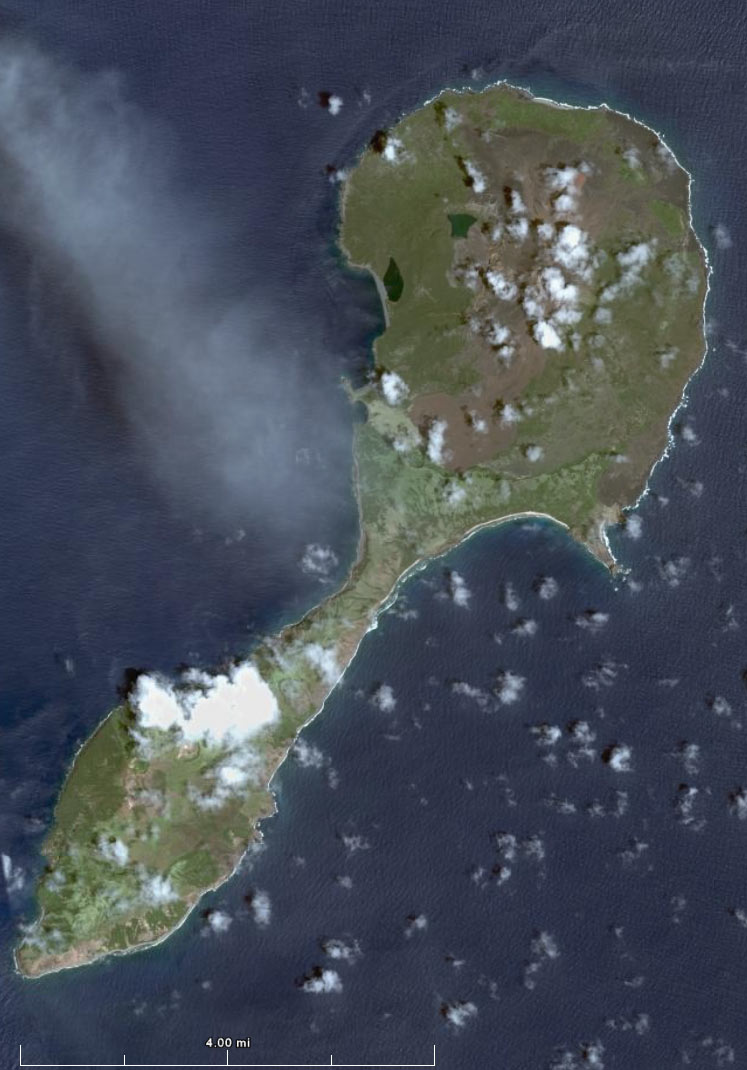
An enlargeable satellite image of the island of Pagan

Regions of the Northern Mariana Islands

==== Ecoregions ====
List of ecoregions in the Northern Mariana Islands

- Ecoregions in the Northern Mariana Islands

==== Administrative divisions ====
Administrative divisions of the Northern Mariana Islands

  - Districts of the Northern Mariana Islands
    - Municipalities of the Northern Mariana Islands

===== Districts =====
Districts of the Northern Mariana Islands

===== Municipalities =====
Municipalities of the Northern Mariana Islands

- Capital of the Northern Mariana Islands: Saipan
- Cities of the Northern Mariana Islands

=== Demography ===
Demographics of the Northern Mariana Islands

== Government and politics ==
Politics of the Northern Mariana Islands

- Form of government:
- Capital of the Northern Mariana Islands: Saipan
- Elections in the Northern Mariana Islands
- Political parties in the Northern Mariana Islands

=== Branches of government ===
Government of the Northern Mariana Islands

==== Executive branch ====
- Head of state: President of the United States,
- Head of government: Governor of the Northern Mariana Islands
- Cabinet of the Northern Mariana Islands

==== Legislative branch ====
- Northern Mariana Islands Commonwealth Legislature (bicameral)
  - Upper house: Northern Mariana Islands Senate
  - Lower house: Northern Mariana Islands House of Representatives

==== Judicial branch ====
Court system of the Northern Mariana Islands

- Supreme Court of the Northern Mariana Islands

=== International organization membership ===
The Commonwealth of the Northern Mariana Islands is a member of:

- Secretariat of the Pacific Community (SPC)
- Universal Postal Union (UPU)

=== Law and order ===
- Cannabis in the Northern Mariana Islands
- Constitution of the Northern Mariana Islands
- Crime in the Northern Mariana Islands
- Human rights in the Northern Mariana Islands
  - LGBT rights in the Northern Mariana Islands
  - Freedom of religion in the Northern Mariana Islands
- Law enforcement in the Northern Mariana Islands

=== Local government ===
Local government in the Northern Mariana Islands

== History ==
- Military history of the Northern Mariana Islands

== Culture ==
Culture of the Northern Mariana Islands

- Architecture of the Northern Mariana Islands
- Cuisine of the Northern Mariana Islands
- Festivals in the Northern Mariana Islands
- Languages of the Northern Mariana Islands
- Media in the Northern Mariana Islands
- National symbols of the Northern Mariana Islands
  - Coat of arms of the Northern Mariana Islands
  - Flag of the Northern Mariana Islands
  - Commonwealth anthem of the Northern Mariana Islands
- People of the Northern Mariana Islands
- Public holidays in the Northern Mariana Islands
- Records of the Northern Mariana Islands
- Religion in the Northern Mariana Islands
  - Christianity in the Northern Mariana Islands
  - Hinduism in the Northern Mariana Islands
  - Islam in the Northern Mariana Islands
  - Judaism in the Northern Mariana Islands
  - Sikhism in the Northern Mariana Islands
- World Heritage Sites in the Northern Mariana Islands: None

=== Arts ===
- Art in the Northern Mariana Islands
- Cinema of the Northern Mariana Islands
- Literature of the Northern Mariana Islands
- Music of the Northern Mariana Islands
- Television in the Northern Mariana Islands
- Theatre in the Northern Mariana Islands

=== Sports ===
Sports in the Northern Mariana Islands

- Football in the Northern Mariana Islands

== Economy ==
Economy of the Northern Mariana Islands

- Economic rank, by nominal GDP (2007): 173rd (one hundred and seventy third)
- Agriculture in the Northern Mariana Islands
- Banking in the Northern Mariana Islands
- Communications in the Northern Mariana Islands
  - Internet in the Northern Mariana Islands
- Companies of the Northern Mariana Islands
- Currency of the Northern Mariana Islands: US Dollar
  - ISO 4217: USD
- Energy policy of the Northern Mariana Islands
- Mining in the Northern Mariana Islands
- Oil industry in the Northern Mariana Islands
- Tourism in the Northern Mariana Islands
- Transport in the Northern Mariana Islands
- the Northern Mariana Islands Stock Exchange

== Education ==
Education in the Northern Mariana Islands

== Infrastructure ==
- Energy in the Northern Mariana Islands
- Health care in the Northern Mariana Islands
- Transportation in the Northern Mariana Islands
  - Airports in the Northern Mariana Islands
  - Rail transport in the Northern Mariana Islands
  - Roads in the Northern Mariana Islands
- Water supply and sanitation in the Northern Mariana Islands

== See also ==
- Topic overview:
  - Northern Mariana Islands
  - Index of Northern Mariana Islands-related articles
- Carolinian language
- Chamorro language
