= Outline of the United States =

Country primarily in North America

The flag of the United States

An orthographic projection of the United States

The following outline is provided as an overview of and topical guide to the United States:

United States of America is a federal republic located primarily in North America, and the world's third-largest country by both land and total area. It shares land borders with Canada to its north and with Mexico to its south and has maritime borders with the Bahamas, Cuba, Russia, and other nations. The United States is considered a major world power.

== General reference ==
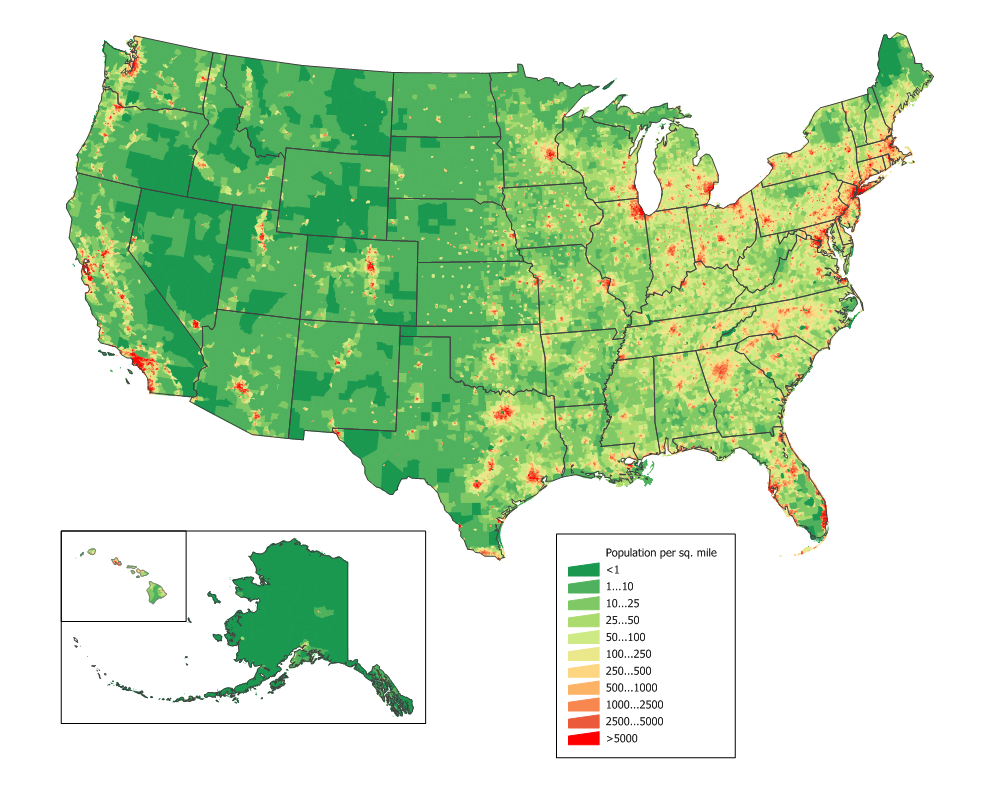
An enlargeable map of the United States showing the population density in 2010

- Pronunciation: /jʊˌnaɪ.tɪd ˈsteɪts/
- Abbreviations: USA or US
- Common English country name: United States or America
- Languages of the United States: English, Spanish, Hawaiian and Native American languages
- Official English country name: United States of America
- Common endonyms: United States, U.S., U.S.A., America
- Official endonym: United States of America
- Common exonyms: United States; America or The States (chiefly British/Commonwealth); North America (chiefly Latin America)
- Adjectivals: United States, American
- Demonyms: American (among others)
- Etymology
- International rankings of the United States
- ISO country codes: US, USA, 840
- ISO region codes: See ISO 3166-2:US
- Internet country code top-level domain: .us, .com, .org, .net, .gov, .edu

== Geography of the United States ==
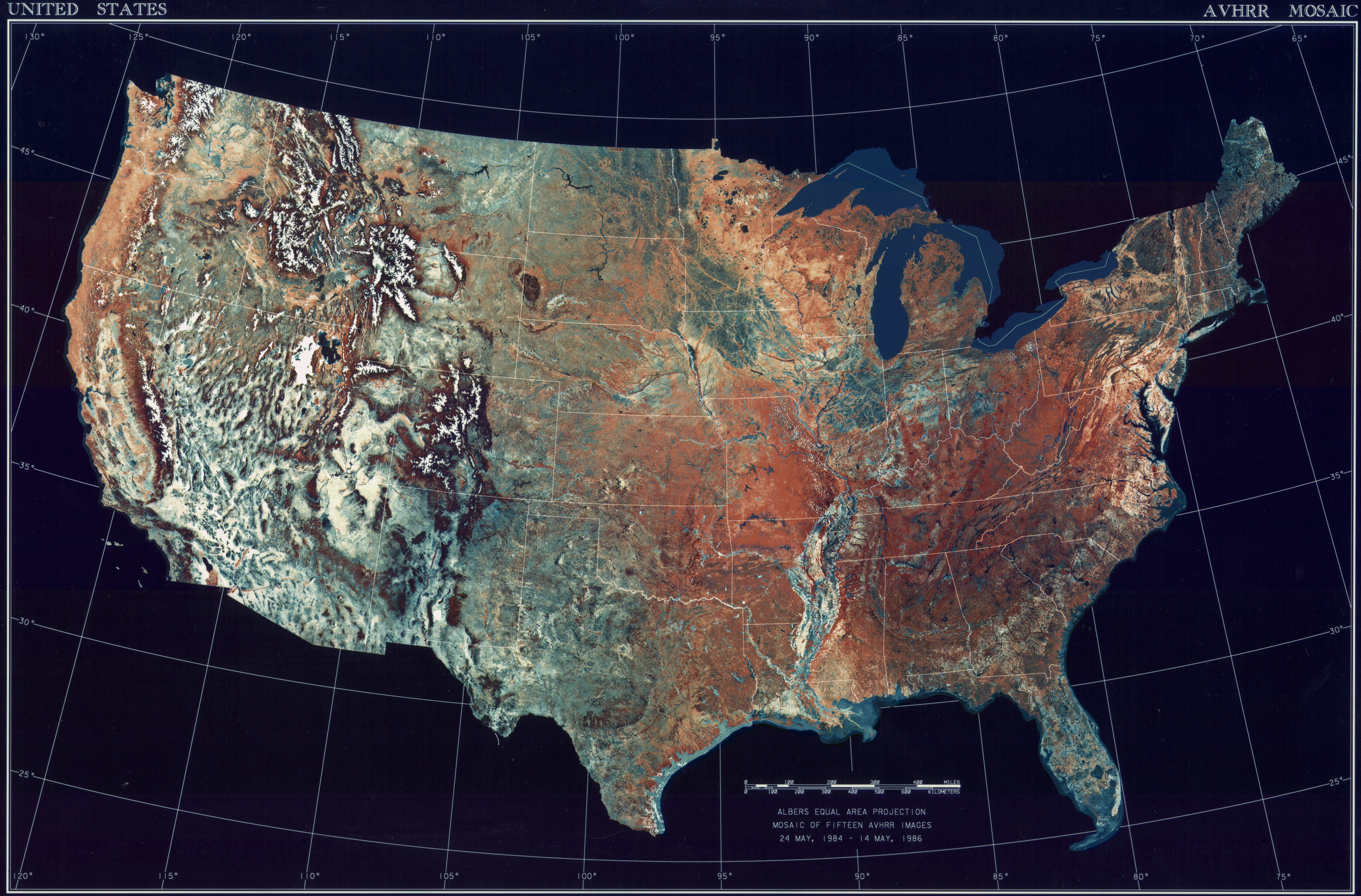
An enlargeable topographic map of the contiguous United States

- The United States is: a megadiverse country
- Location (50 states):
  - Northern Hemisphere and Western Hemisphere (except western Aleutian Islands)
    - Americas
      - North America
        - Northern America
    - Oceania
      - Polynesia
  - Time zones:
    - Eastern Time Zone (UTC−05/UTC−04 during DST)
    - Central Time Zone (UTC−06/UTC−05 during DST)
    - Mountain Time Zone (UTC−07/UTC−06 during DST)
    - Pacific Time Zone (UTC−08/UTC−07 during DST)
    - Alaska Time Zone (UTC−09/UTC−08 during DST)
    - Hawaii–Aleutian Time Zone (UTC−10/UTC−09 during DST)
  - Extreme points of the United States:
    - North: Point Barrow, Alaska 71°23′15″N 156°28′52″W
    - South: Ka Lae, Island of Hawai'i, Hawai'i (18°54′39″N 155°40′52″W)
    - East: Sail Rock, just offshore West Quoddy Head, Maine 44°48′54″N 66°56′52″W
    - Physically East: Eastern Semisopochnoi Island, Alaska 51°57′40″N 179°46′29″E
    - West: Peaked Island, offshore Cape Wrangell, Attu Island, Alaska 52°55′00″N 172°26′00″E
    - Physically West: Western Amatignak Island, Alaska 51°16′06″N 179°09′00″W
    - High: Denali, Alaska at 6,194 meters (20,322 ft) 63°4′10″N 151°0′26″W
    - Low: Badwater Basin, Death Valley, California at −86 meters (−282 ft) 36°13′58″N 116°46′42″W
  - Land boundaries: 12,034 km (7,477 mi)

Canada 8,893 km (5,525 mi) (Note: The total length of the land border between Canada and the United States is the longest between any two countries.)
Mexico 3,145 km (1,954 mi)

- Coastline: 19,924 km (12,380 mi)

- Population of the United States: 308,745,538 (2010 census) – 3rd most populous country
- Area of the United States: 9,826,630 km^{2} (3,794,080 sq mi) – 4th most extensive country
- Atlas of the United States
- Cities of the United States, by population

=== Environment of the United States ===
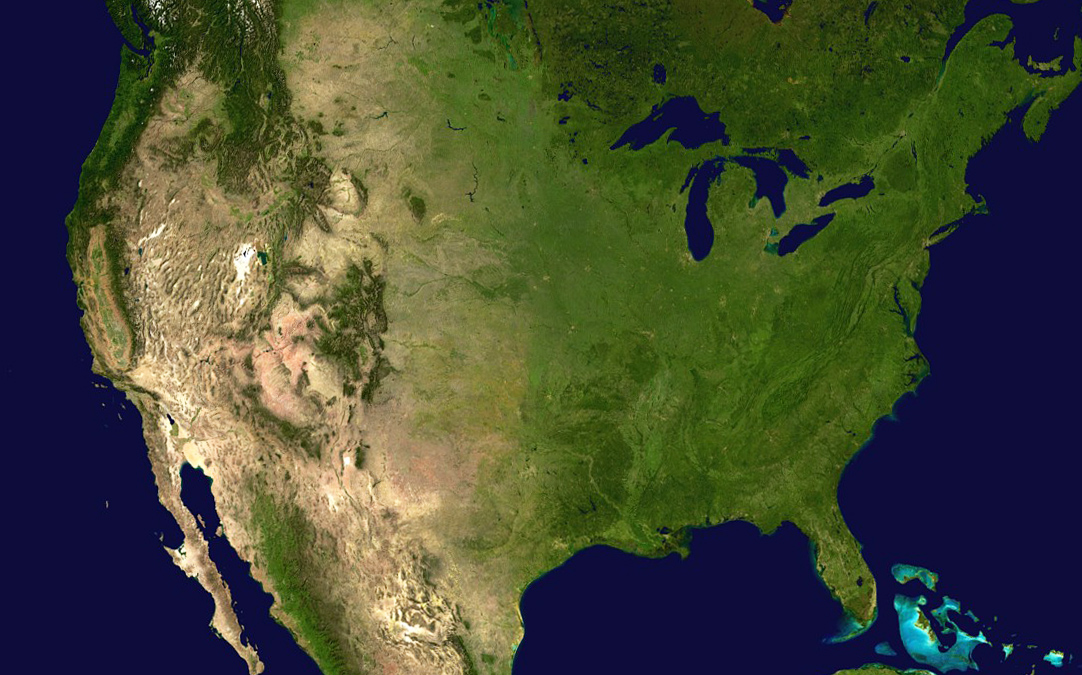
An enlargeable satellite composite image of the contiguous United States. Lush temperate, subtropical, and tropical vegetation and low to moderately high mountains prevail throughout the humid east, and high mountains, plateaus, temperate and subtropical savannas, and hot dry deserts prevail in the west.

- Beaches in the United States
- Climate of the United States
  - Climate change in the United States
- Environmental issues in the United States
- Ecoregions in the United States
- Geology of the United States
  - Earthquakes in the United States
- National parks of the United States
- Protected areas of the United States
- Superfund sites in the United States
- Wildlife of the United States
  - Flora of the United States
  - Fauna of the United States
    - Birds of the United States
    - Mammals of the United States
    - Reptiles of the United States
    - Amphibians of the United States

==== Geographic features of the United States ====
- Fjords of the United States
- Glaciers of the United States
- Islands of the United States
- Lakes of the United States
- Mountain peaks of the United States
  - The 104 highest major summits of the United States
  - The 129 most prominent summits of the United States
  - The 112 most isolated major summits of the United States
  - Alaska Range
  - Appalachian Mountains
  - Black Hills
  - Cascade Range
  - Ozark Mountains
  - Sierra Nevada
  - Rocky Mountains
  - Volcanoes of the United States
- Rivers of the United States
  - Arkansas River
  - Columbia River
  - Colorado River
  - Connecticut River
  - Hudson River
  - Mississippi River
  - Missouri River
  - Potomac River
  - Rio Grande
  - Ohio River
  - Delaware River
  - Snake River
  - Susquehanna River
  - Yukon River
- Waterfalls of the United States
- Valleys of the United States
- World Heritage Sites in the United States

=== Regions of the United States ===
- East Coast of the United States
- West Coast of the United States
- Belt regions of the United States
- New England
- Mid-Atlantic
- The South
- Midwest
- Great Plains
- Pacific Northwest
- Southwest
- Hawaiian Archipelago

==== Physiographic divisions of the United States ====
The geography of the United States varies across their immense area. Within the contiguous U.S., eight distinct physiographic divisions exist, though each is composed of several smaller physiographic subdivisions. These major divisions are:

- Laurentian Upland – part of the Canadian Shield that extends into the northern United States Great Lakes area.
- Atlantic Plain – the coastal regions of the eastern and southern parts includes the continental shelf, the Atlantic Coast and the Gulf Coast.
- Appalachian Highlands – lying on the eastern side of the United States, it includes the Appalachian Mountains, Adirondacks and New England province.
- Interior Plains – part of the interior contiguous United States, it includes much of what is called the Great Plains.
- Interior Highlands – also part of the interior contiguous United States, this division includes the Ozark Plateau.
- Rocky Mountain System – one branch of the Cordilleran system lying far inland in the western states.
- Intermontane Plateaus – also divided into the Columbia Plateau, the Colorado Plateau and the Basin and Range Province, it is a system of plateaus, basins, ranges and gorges between the Rocky and Pacific Mountain Systems. It is the setting for the Grand Canyon, the Great Basin and Death Valley.
- Pacific Mountain System – the coastal mountain ranges and features in the west coast of the United States.

=== Administrative divisions of the United States ===
==== States of the United States ====
At the Declaration of Independence, the United States consisted of 13 states, former colonies of the United Kingdom. In the following years, the number of states has grown steadily due to expansion to the west, conquest and purchase of lands by the American government, and division of existing states to the current number of 50 United States:

Map of the United States with state border lines. Alaska and Hawaii are shown at different scales, and that the Aleutian Islands and the uninhabited northwestern Hawaiian Islands are omitted from this map.

- Alabama (AL)
- Alaska (AK)
- Arizona (AZ)
- Arkansas (AR)
- California (CA)
- Colorado (CO)
- Connecticut (CT)
- Delaware (DE)
- Florida (FL)
- Georgia (GA)
- Hawaii (HI)
- Idaho (ID)
- Illinois (IL)
- Indiana (IN)
- Iowa (IA)
- Kansas (KS)
- Kentucky (KY)
- Louisiana (LA)
- Maine (ME)
- Maryland (MD)
- Massachusetts (MA)
- Michigan (MI)
- Minnesota (MN)
- Mississippi (MS)
- Missouri (MO)
- Montana (MT)
- Nebraska (NE)
- Nevada (NV)
- New Hampshire (NH)
- New Jersey (NJ)
- New Mexico (NM)
- New York (NY)
- North Carolina (NC)
- North Dakota (ND)
- Ohio (OH)
- Oklahoma (OK)
- Oregon (OR)
- Pennsylvania (PA)
- Rhode Island (RI)
- South Carolina (SC)
- South Dakota (SD)
- Tennessee (TN)
- Texas (TX)
- Utah (UT)
- Vermont (VT)
- Virginia (VA)
- Washington (WA)
- West Virginia (WV)
- Wisconsin (WI)
- Wyoming (WY)

==== Territories of the United States ====
Location of the insular areas of the United States: The United States of America Incorporated unorganized territory Unincorporated organized territory Unincorporated unorganized territory Freely associated commonwealth

- United States territory
  - Territorial evolution of the United States

===== Incorporated organized territories =====
- none since 1959

===== Incorporated unorganized territories =====
- Palmyra Atoll

===== Unincorporated organized territories =====
- Commonwealth of Puerto Rico
- Commonwealth of the Northern Mariana Islands
- Territory of Guam
- Territory of the United States Virgin Islands

===== Unincorporated unorganized territories =====
- Territory of American Samoa, technically unorganized, but self-governing under a constitution last revised in 1967
- Baker Island, uninhabited
- Howland Island, uninhabited
- Jarvis Island, uninhabited
- Johnston Atoll, uninhabited
- Kingman Reef, uninhabited
- Bajo Nuevo Bank, uninhabited (disputed with Colombia)
- Serranilla Bank, uninhabited (disputed with Colombia)
- Midway Islands, no indigenous inhabitants, currently included in the Midway Atoll National Wildlife Refuge
- Navassa Island, uninhabited (claimed by Haiti)
- Wake Atoll consisting of Peale, Wake and Wilkes Islands, no indigenous inhabitants, only contractor personnel (claimed by the Marshall Islands)

==== Geography of the states and territories ====
AK – AL – AR – AZ – CA – CO – CT – DC – DE – FL – GA – HI – IA – ID – IL – IN – KS – KY – LA – MA – MD – ME – MI – MN – MO – MS
MT – NC – ND – NE – NH – NM – NV – NJ – NY – OH – OK – OR – PA – RI – SC – SD – TN – TX – UT – VA – VT – WA – WI – WV – WY

AS – GU – MP – PR – VI

=== Demography of the United States ===
AK – AL – AR – AZ – CA – CO – CT – DC – DE – FL – GA – HI – IA – ID – IL – IN – KS – KY – LA – MA – MD – ME – MI – MN – MO – MS
MT – NC – ND – NE – NH – NM – NV – NJ – NY – OH – OK – OR – PA – RI – SC – SD – TN – TX – UT – VA – VT – WA – WI – WV – WY

AS – GU – MP – PR – VI

== History of the United States ==
John Trumbull's Declaration of Independence is usually incorrectly identified as a depiction of the signing of the Declaration of Independence, but it actually shows the drafting committee presenting its work to the Second Continental Congress.

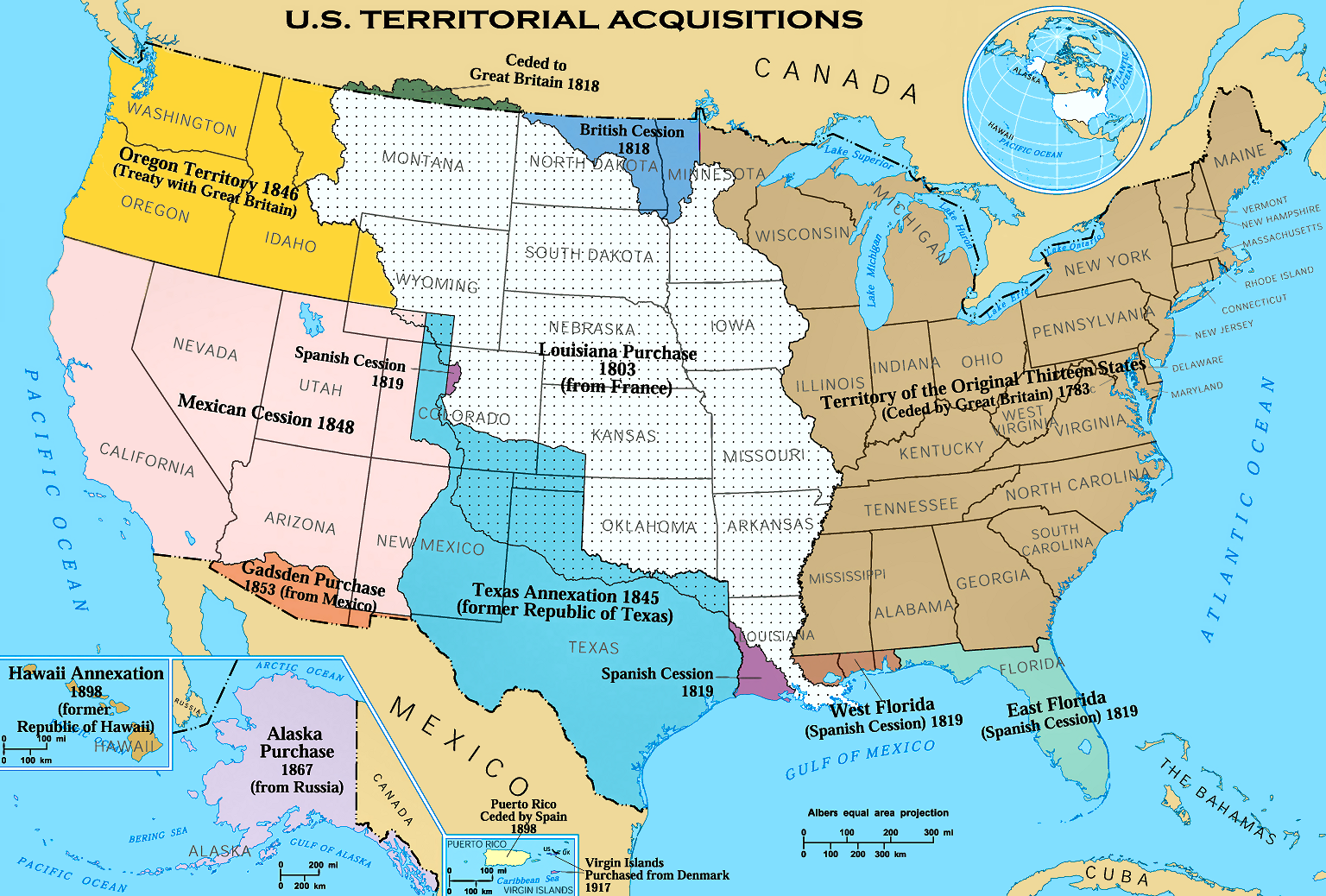
A map of the territorial evolution of the United States

=== Period-coverage ===
- Prehistory of the United States
- Pre-Columbian era
- Colonial period
- 1776 to 1789
- 1789 to 1815
- 1815 to 1849
- 1849 to 1865
- 1865 to 1917
- 1917 to 1945
- 1945 to 1964
- 1964 to 1980
- 1980 to 1991
- 1991 to 2016
- 2016 to present

==== History of the states and territories ====
AK – AL – AR – AZ – CA – CO – CT – DC – DE – FL – GA – HI – IA – ID – IL – IN – KS – KY – LA – MA – MD – ME – MI – MN – MO – MS
MT – NC – ND – NE – NH – NM – NV – NJ – NY – OH – OK – OR – PA – RI – SC – SD – TN – TX – UT – VA – VT – WA – WI – WV – WY

AS – GU – MP – PR – VI

==== History of cities ====
- Outline of the history of Los Angeles

=== Presidents of the United States ===
- George Washington: 1789–1797
- John Adams: 1797–1801
- Thomas Jefferson: 1801–1809
- James Madison: 1809–1817
- James Monroe: 1817–1825
- John Quincy Adams: 1825–1829
- Andrew Jackson: 1829–1837
- Martin Van Buren: 1837–1841
- William Henry Harrison: 1841
- John Tyler: 1841–1845
- James K. Polk: 1845–1849
- Zachary Taylor: 1849–1850
- Millard Fillmore: 1850–1853
- Franklin Pierce: 1853–1857
- James Buchanan: 1857–1861
- Abraham Lincoln: 1861–1865
- Andrew Johnson: 1865–1869
- Ulysses S. Grant: 1869–1877
- Rutherford B. Hayes: 1877–1881
- James A. Garfield: 1881
- Chester A. Arthur: 1881–1885
- Grover Cleveland: 1885–1889
- Benjamin Harrison: 1889–1893
- Grover Cleveland: 1893–1897
- William McKinley: 1897–1901
- Theodore Roosevelt: 1901–1909
- William H. Taft: 1909–1913
- Woodrow Wilson: 1913–1921
- Warren G. Harding: 1921–1923
- Calvin Coolidge: 1923–1929
- Herbert Hoover: 1929–1933
- Franklin D. Roosevelt: 1933–1945
- Harry S. Truman: 1945–1953
- Dwight D. Eisenhower: 1953–1961
- John F. Kennedy: 1961–1963
- Lyndon B. Johnson: 1963–1969
- Richard M. Nixon: 1969–1974
- Gerald Ford: 1974–1977
- Jimmy Carter: 1977–1981
- Ronald Reagan: 1981–1989
- George H. W. Bush: 1989–1993
- Bill Clinton: 1993–2001
- George W. Bush: 2001–2009
- Barack Obama: 2009–2017
- Donald Trump: 2017–2021
- Joe Biden: 2021–2025
- Donald Trump: 2025–present

== Government and politics in the United States ==
- Form of government: presidential, federal republic
- Capital (political) of the United States: Washington, D.C.
  - List of Capitals
- Flag of the United States
- Political parties in the United States
- Elections in the United States
- Voting rights in the United States
- List of political parties in the United States
  - Democratic Party
    - History of the United States Democratic Party
  - Republican Party
    - History of the United States Republican Party
  - Green Party
  - Independent Party
  - Libertarian Party
  - Reform Party
  - Constitution Party
  - Socialist Party USA
- Political divisions of the United States
- Canadian and American politics compared
- Politics of the Southern United States
- Criticism of the United States government
- Corruption in the United States

=== Federal government ===
- United States Constitution

==== Legislative branch ====
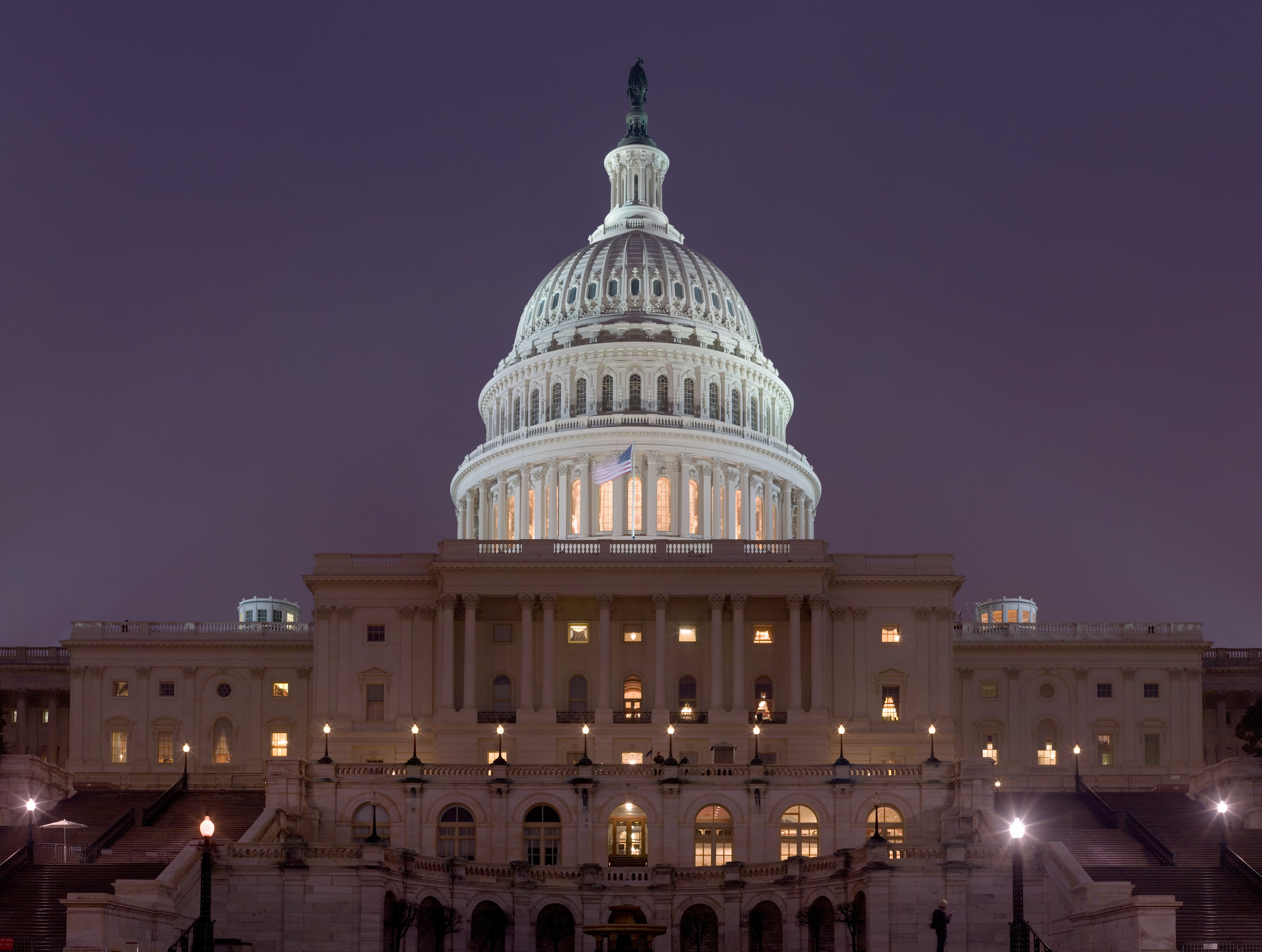
The United States Capitol

- United States Congress
  - United States Senate
    - President pro tempore of the United States Senate, Patty Murray (D-WA)
  - United States House of Representatives
    - Speaker of the United States House of Representatives, Mike Johnson (R-LA)

==== Executive branch ====
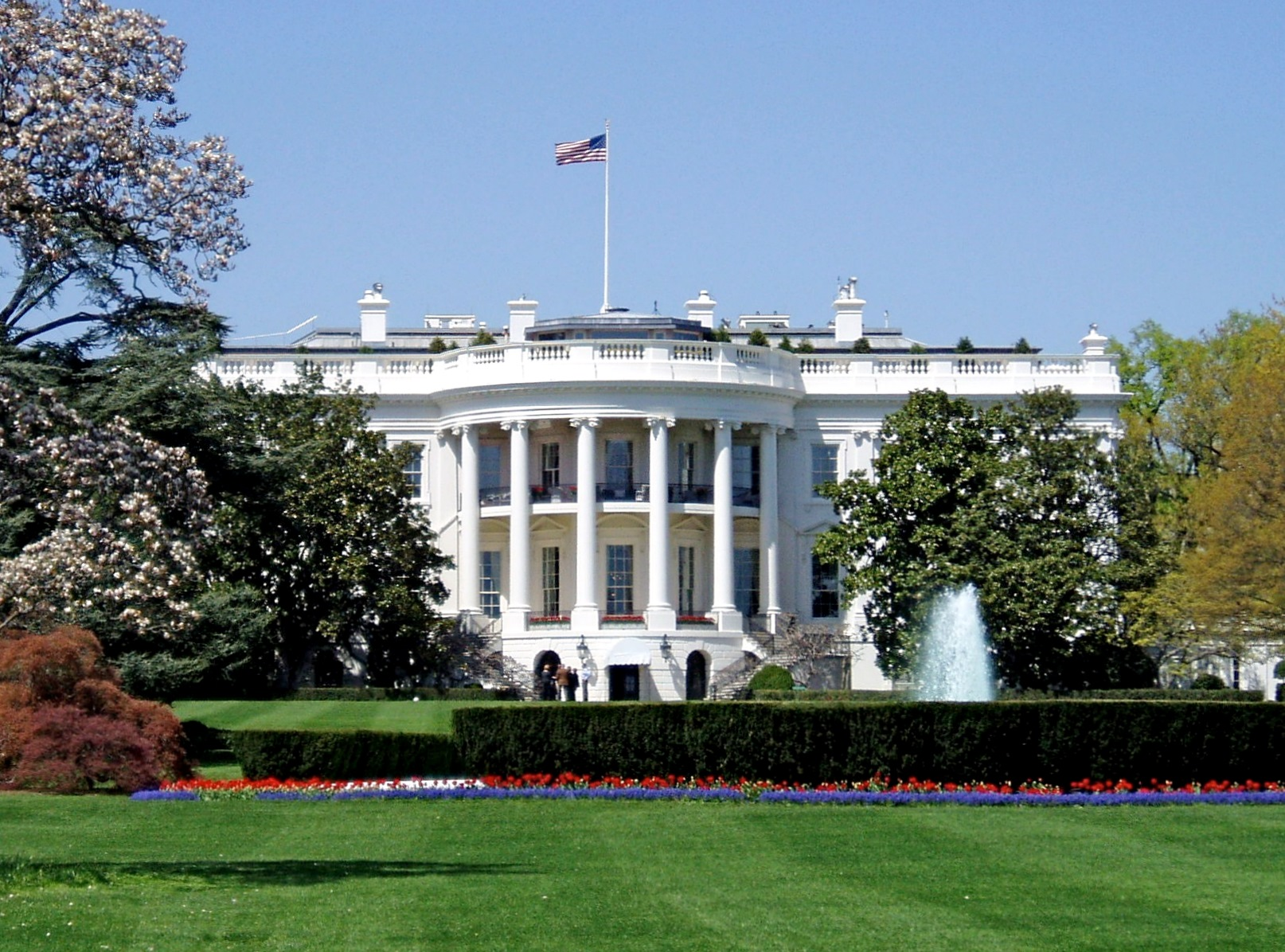
The White House

- Head of state and head of government, 47th President of the United States, Donald Trump
  - 50th Vice President of the United States, JD Vance

===== Federal executive departments =====
All departments are listed by their present-day name and only departments with past or present cabinet-level status are listed. Order of succession applies only to within the cabinet; the vice president has always been first in the line of succession, and the Speaker of the House and the President pro tem of the Senate have at times been included.

Department	Creation	Order of succession	Modifications since creation	2007 Budget in billions of dollars	Employees (2007)
State	1789	1	Initially named "Department of Foreign Affairs"	9.96	30,266
Treasury	1789	2		11.10	115,897
Defense	1947	3	Initially named "National Military Establishment"	439.30	3,000,000
Justice	1870	4	Position of Attorney General created in 1789, but had no department until 1870	23.40	112,557
Interior	1849	5		10.70	71,436
Agriculture	1889	6		77.60	109,832
Commerce	1903	7	Originally named Commerce and Labor; Labor later separated	6.20	36,000
Labor	1913	8		59.70	17,347
Health and Human Services	1953	9	Originally named Health, Education, and Welfare; Education later separated	543.20	67,000
Housing and Urban Development	1965	10		46.20	10,600
Transportation	1966	11		58.00	58,622
Energy	1977	12		21.50	116,100
Education	1979	13		62.80	4,487
Veterans Affairs	1989	14		73.20	235,000
Homeland Security	2002	15		44.60	208,000
Total budget (fiscal year 2007):				1,523.42	4,193,144

==== Commissions ====
- Federal Trade Commission
- U.S. Securities and Exchange Commission

==== Judicial branch ====
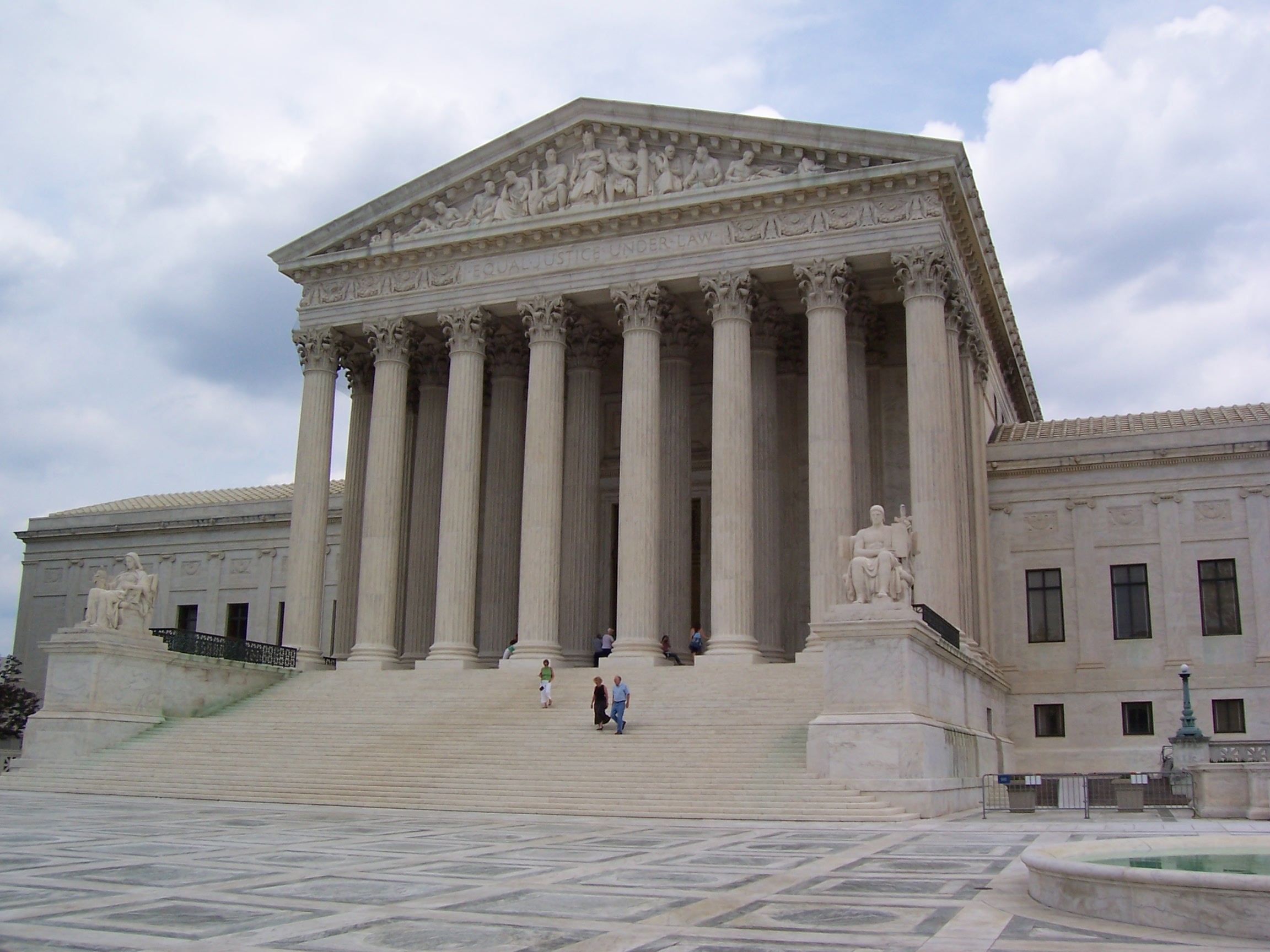
The United States Supreme Court building

- United States federal courts
  - United States Supreme Court
    - Chief Justice of the United States, John Roberts
  - United States court of appeals
  - United States district court

=== State and territory governments ===
AK – AL – AR – AZ – CA – CO – CT – DC – DE – FL – GA – HI – IA – ID – IL – IN – KS – KY – LA – MA – MD – ME – MI – MN – MO – MS
MT – NC – ND – NE – NH – NM – NV – NJ – NY – OH – OK – OR – PA – RI – SC – SD – TN – TX – UT – VA – VT – WA – WI – WV – WY

AS – GU – MP – PR – VI

=== Politics of the states and territories ===
AK – AL – AR – AZ – CA – CO – CT – DC – DE – FL – GA – HI – IA – ID – IL – IN – KS – KY – LA – MA – MD – ME – MI – MN – MO – MS
MT – NC – ND – NE – NH – NM – NV – NJ – NY – OH – OK – OR – PA – RI – SC – SD – TN – TX – UT – VA – VT – WA – WI – WV – WY

AS – GU – MP – PR – VI

=== Foreign relations ===
- Foreign policy of the United States

==== International organization membership ====
- Member state of the Group of Twenty Finance Ministers and Central Bank Governors
- Member state of the North Atlantic Treaty Organization
- Member state of the Organization of American States
- Member state of the United Nations
- Member of the World Health Organization
- Member of the World Organization of the Scout Movement
- World Veterans Federation

=== Military ===
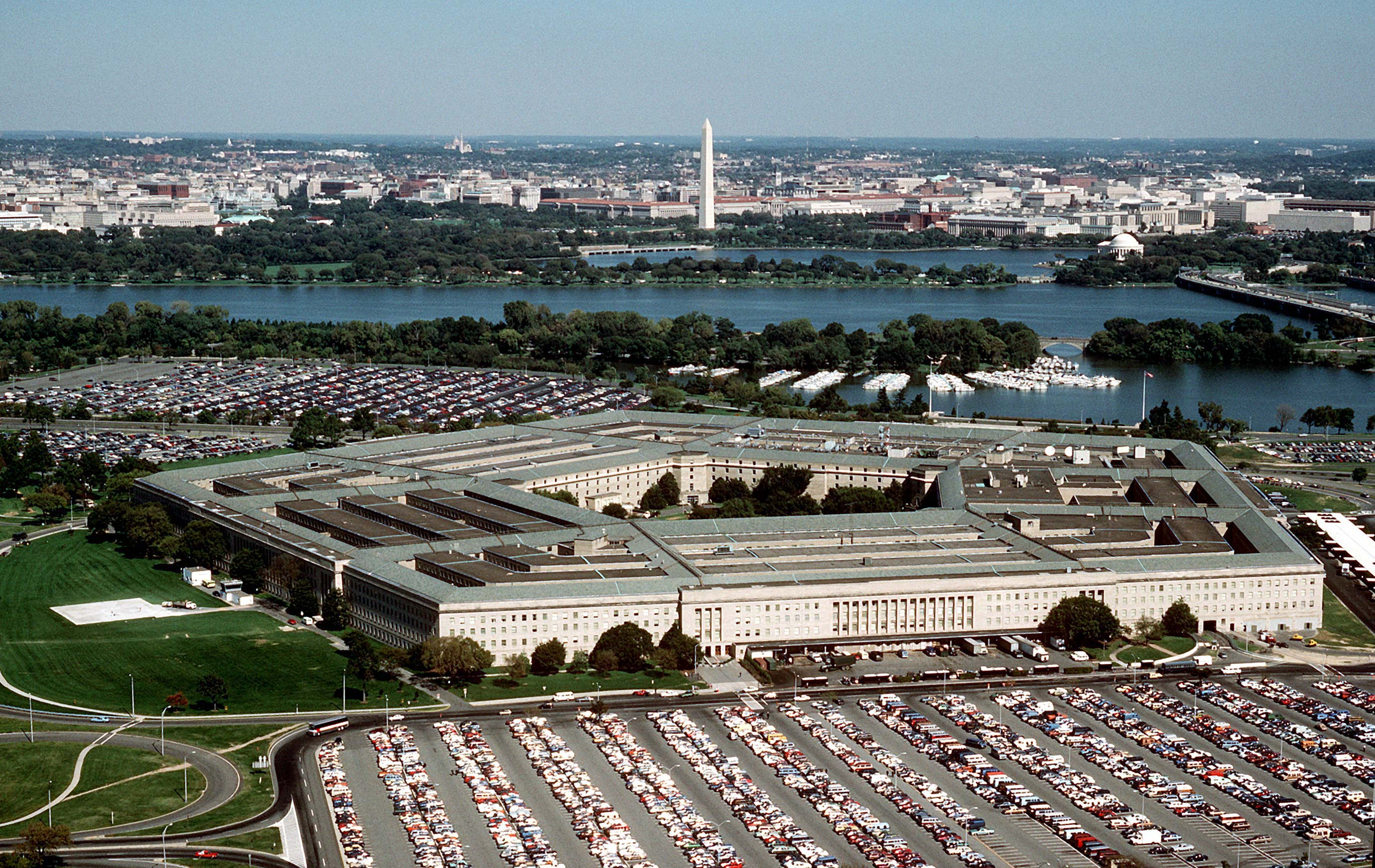
The Pentagon

- United States Army
  - United States Army Reserve
  - Army National Guard
- United States Marine Corps
  - United States Marine Corps Reserve
- United States Navy
  - United States Navy Reserve
- United States Air Force
  - Air Force Reserve Command
  - Air National Guard
- United States Space Force
- United States Coast Guard
  - United States Coast Guard Reserve

=== Intelligence organizations ===
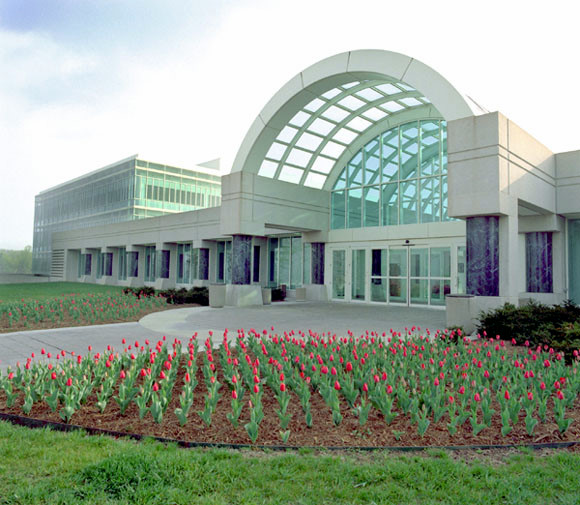
Headquarters of the Central Intelligence Agency

- Central Intelligence Agency
- Sixteenth Air Force
- United States Army Military Intelligence
- Defense Intelligence Agency
- Marine Corps Intelligence Activity
- National Geospatial-Intelligence Agency
- National Reconnaissance Office
- National Security Agency
- Office of Naval Intelligence
- Coast Guard Intelligence
- Federal Bureau of Investigation
- Drug Enforcement Administration
- Bureau of Intelligence and Research
- Office of Intelligence and Analysis
- Office of Terrorism and Financial Intelligence
- Office of Intelligence and Counterintelligence

== Law of the United States ==
- Adoption in the United States
- Age of candidacy laws in the United States
- Arbitration in the United States
  - Arbitration case law in the United States
- Assisted suicide in the United States
- Attorneys in the United States
- Bankruptcy in the United States
- Bicycle law in the United States
- Birthright citizenship in the United States
- Blasphemy law in the United States
- Blue laws in the United States
- Campaign finance reform in the United States
- Cannabis in the United States
- Capital punishment in the United States
  - Capital punishment debate in the United States
- Censure in the United States
- Census in the United States
- Censorship in the United States
  - Book censorship in the United States
  - Censorship of broadcasting in the United States
- Child-related laws
  - Child custody laws in the United States
  - Child labor laws in the United States
  - Child pornography laws in the United States
  - Child sexual abuse laws in the United States
  - Child support in the United States
- Constitution of the United States
  - United States Bill of Rights
  - Separation of church and state in the United States
  - Separation of powers under the United States Constitution
- Copyright law in the United States
  - Public domain in the United States
- Crime in the United States
  - Polygamy in the United States
  - Race and crime in the United States
  - Rape in the United States
  - Scientific plagiarism in the United States
- Human rights in the United States
  - Abortion in the United States
  - Censorship in the United States
  - Civil liberties in the United States
  - Freedom of association in the United States
  - Freedom of information in the United States
  - Freedom of movement under United States law
  - Freedom of religion in the United States
  - Freedom of speech in the United States
  - Freedom of the press in the United States
  - Gambling in the United States
  - LGBT rights in the United States
- Incarceration in the United States
- Marriage in the United States
  - Civil union in the United States
- Same-sex unions in the United States
- Domestic partnership in the United States
- Common-law marriage in the United States
- Divorce in the United States
- Same-sex marriage in the United States
- Same-sex marriage law in the United States by state
- Same-sex marriage legislation in the United States
- Same-sex marriage status in the United States by state
- Prisoner rights in the United States
- Pro se legal representation in the United States
- Prostitution in the United States
- Right of foreigners to vote in the United States
- Right to keep and bear arms
  - Gun law in the United States
    - Gun laws in the United States by state
- Right to petition in the United States
- Rights and responsibilities of marriages in the United States
- Smoking in the United States
  - Smoking bans in the United States
- Law enforcement in the United States
- Local ordinance
- Rent control in the United States
- School anti-bullying legislation in the United States
- Secession in the United States
- Securities regulation in the United States
- Speed limits in the United States
  - Rail speed limits in the United States
- State law
- Taxation in the United States
  - Capital gains tax in the United States
  - Cigarette taxes in the United States
  - Internal Revenue Code
  - Property tax in the United States
- United States Code
- Zoning in the United States

== Culture of the United States ==
- American humor
- American family structure
- Architecture of the United States
- Languages of the United States
  - American English
  - American Spanish
- National symbols of the United States
- Religion in the United States
- Society of the United States
- World Heritage Sites in the United States

=== American cuisine ===
- Supermarket chains in the United States
- Food companies in the United States
- Fast food chains in the United States
- Vineyards in the United States
- Orchards in the United States

==== Historical cuisine ====
- American Chinese cuisine
- Cajun cuisine
- Italian-American cuisine
- Louisiana Creole cuisine
- Midwestern cuisine
- Native American cuisine
- New England cuisine
- Pacific Northwest cuisine
- Southern cuisine
- Southwestern cuisine
- Tex-Mex cuisine

==== Cuisine of the regions ====
- Cuisine of the Southwestern United States
- Cuisine of the Mid-Atlantic United States
- Cuisine of the Midwestern United States
- Cuisine of the Northeastern United States
- Cuisine of the Southern United States
- Cuisine of the Western United States

=== Art in the United States ===
- American Literature
  - American novelists
  - Great American Novel
- Dance in the United States
- Museums in the United States
- Music of the United States
- Theater of the United States
  - American playwrights
- Television in the United States
- Visual arts of the United States

==== Film ====
- Cinema of the United States
- Academy Award
- Golden Globe Award
- Highest-grossing films
- Film production companies

==== Music in the United States ====
- Best-selling Music Artists
- Rock and Roll Hall of Fame

===== Genres =====
- Alternative rock
- Americana
- Bluegrass music
- Blues
- Contemporary Christian music
- Country music
- Folk music
- Gospel music
- Hardcore punk
- Heavy metal
- Hip hop
- Jazz
- Punk rock
- R&B music
- Rock music
- Soul music

===== Music in the states and territories =====
AK – AL – AR – AZ – CA – CO – CT – DC – DE – FL – GA – HI – IA – ID – IL – IN – KS – KY – LA – MA – MD – ME – MI – MN – MO – MS
MT – NC – ND – NE – NH – NM – NV – NJ – NY – OH – OK – OR – PA – RI – SC – SD – TN – TX – UT – VA – VT – WA – WI – WV – WY

AS – GU – MP – PR – VI

==== Radio ====
- National Association of Broadcasters
- NAB Broadcasting Hall of Fame

=== Sports in the United States ===
- Football in the United States
- Baseball in the United States
- Ice hockey in the United States
- Little League Baseball
- Motorsport in the United States
- Pickleball in the United States
- Soccer in the United States
  - Women's soccer in the United States
- Stadiums in the United States

==== List of Major Sports Leagues in the United States ====
- Major League Baseball (MLB)
- National Basketball Association (NBA)
- National Football League (NFL)
- National Hockey League (NHL)
- Major League Soccer (MLS)

===== Other top-level leagues and series =====
- IndyCar Series
- Legends Tour – for women's golfers age 45 and over
- LPGA Tour (Ladies' Professional Golf Association)
- Major League Lacrosse (MLL)
- Major League Rugby (MLR) – rugby union
- NASCAR (National Association for Stock Car Auto Racing)
  - NASCAR Cup Series
- National Lacrosse League (NLL)
- National Women's Soccer League (NWSL)
- PGA Tour
- PGA Tour Champions – for men's golfers age 50 and over
- Professional Bull Riders (PBR)
- Professional Rodeo Cowboys Association (PRCA)
- Sports Car Club of America (SCCA)
- Women's National Basketball Association (WNBA)

===== Minor and developmental professional leagues and series =====
- American Hockey League (AHL)
- American Indoor Football Association (AIFA)
- American National Rugby League (AMNRL)
- Continental Indoor Football League (CIFL)
- ECHL (formerly East Coast Hockey League)
- Korn Ferry Tour – men's golf
- Minor League Baseball
- National Arena League
- NBA G League
- Professional Inline Hockey Association (PIHA)
- Rugby Super League (RSL)
- Symetra Tour – women's golf
- United Indoor Football (UIF)
- United States Australian Football League (USAFL)
- Xfinity Series – NASCAR

===== College sports =====
- College baseball
- College football
- College ice hockey
- College lacrosse
- College soccer
- College softball
- Collegiate wrestling
- Athletic scholarship
- College recruiting
- National Collegiate Athletic Association (NCAA)
  - List of NCAA conferences
  - NCAA Division I
    - NCAA Division I Football Bowl Subdivision
  - NCAA Division II
  - NCAA Division III

===== Sports governing bodies =====
- Professional Golfers' Association of America (PGA of America)
- United States of America Cricket Association (USACA)
- United States Golf Association (USGA)
- United States Olympic & Paralympic Committee (USOPC)
- United States Rowing Association
- United States Soccer Federation (U.S. Soccer)
- United States Tennis Association (USTA)
- USA Basketball
- USA Cycling
- USA Rugby – governs rugby union
- USA Track and Field
- U.S. Ski & Snowboard
- U.S. Figure Skating

==== Sports by state and territory ====
AK – AL – AR – AZ – CA – CO – CT – DC – DE – FL – GA – HI – IA – ID – IL – IN – KS – KY – LA – MA – MD – ME – MI – MN – MO – MS
MT – NC – ND – NE – NH – NM – NV – NJ – NY – OH – OK – OR – PA – RI – SC – SD – TN – TX – UT – VA – VT – WA – WI – WV – WY

AS – GU – MP – PR – VI

==== Sports Museums in the United States ====
- National Baseball Hall of Fame and Museum
- Pro Football Hall of Fame
- Hockey Hall of Fame
- International Boxing Hall of Fame
- International Tennis Hall of Fame
- NASCAR Hall of Fame
- Naismith Memorial Basketball Hall of Fame
- World Golf Hall of Fame

== Education in the United States ==
- Early childhood education in the United States
- K-12 education in the United States
  - High school in the United States
  - Homeschooling in the United States
- Higher education in the United States
  - Community colleges in the United States
  - Vocational education in the United States
  - For-profit higher education in the United States
  - Liberal arts colleges in the United States
- Language education in the United States

=== Education in the states and territories ===
AK – AL – AR – AZ – CA – CO – CT – DC – DE – FL – GA – HI – IA – ID – IL – IN – KS – KY – LA – MA – MD – ME – MI – MN – MO – MS
MT – NC – ND – NE – NH – NM – NV – NJ – NY – OH – OK – OR – PA – RI – SC – SD – TN – TX – UT – VA – VT – WA – WI – WV – WY

AS – GU – MP – PR – VI

== Economy and infrastructure of the United States ==
The United States is the world's largest economy (IMF, 2010).

- Economic rank, by nominal GDP (2026): 1st
- Economic rank, by GDP (PPP) (2026): 1st
- Currency of the United States: US$
  - ISO 4217: USD
- Banking in the United States
  - Federal Reserve System
- Communications in the United States
  - Internet in the United States
    - American Registry for Internet Numbers (ARIN)
  - EDGAR
  - Form 10-K
- Companies of the United States
- Economic history of the United States
  - National debt by U.S. presidential terms
  - United States public debt
- Energy in the United States
  - Electricity sector of the United States
    - Coal power in the United States
      - Coal mining in the United States
    - Nuclear power in the United States
      - Nuclear energy policy of the United States
    - Renewable energy in the United States
      - Geothermal energy in the United States
      - Solar power in the United States
      - Wind power in the United States
      - Hydroelectric power in the United States
        - United States Wind Energy Policy
  - Energy conservation in the United States
  - Energy policy of the United States
    - U.S. Lighting Energy Policy
    - United States energy independence
    - Nuclear energy policy of the United States
    - United States Department of Energy
    - United States energy law
    - United States Senate Committee on Energy and Natural Resources
    - United States House Committee on Energy and Commerce
    - United States Wind Energy Policy
  - Petroleum in the United States
    - Offshore oil and gas in the United States
    - Oil reserves in the United States
- Health care in the United States
- Industry trade groups in the United States
- Tourism in the United States
  - Shopping malls in the United States
- Transportation in the United States
  - Air transportation in the United States
    - Airports in the United States
  - Highway system in the United States
  - Rail transport in the United States
- Trade policy of the United States
  - North American Free Trade Agreement
  - Organisation for Economic Co-operation and Development
  - World Trade Organization
- Wealth in the United States
  - American decline
  - American Dream
  - American oligarchs
  - Household income in the United States
  - Income inequality in the United States
  - Personal income in the United States
  - Poverty in the United States
- Water supply and sanitation in the United States

=== Economy by state and territory ===
AK – AL – AR – AZ – CA – CO – CT – DC – DE – FL – GA – HI – IA – ID – IL – IN – KS – KY – LA – MA – MD – ME – MI – MN – MO - MS
MT – NC – ND – NE – NH – NM – NV – NJ – NY – OH – OK – OR – PA – RI – SC – SD – TN – TX – UT – VA – VT – WA – WI – WV – WY

AS – GU – MP – PR – VI

=== Health in the United States ===
- Healthcare in the United States
- Lists of hospitals in the United States
- Disability in the United States
- Birth control in the United States
- Obesity in the United States
- List of U.S. states and territories by life expectancy
- List of U.S. states and territories by infant mortality rates

=== Tourism in the United States ===
- Walt Disney World
- Hollywood
- Ski Resorts
