= Saipan Sucks =

Website critical of the Northern Mariana Islands

Saipan Sucks (formerly SaipanSucks.com, now saipansucks.weebly.com) is a politically and socially critical website about the United States Commonwealth of the Northern Mariana Islands (CNMI), particularly its principal island and seat of government, Saipan. The website brings attention to what it alleges as systemic societal corruption in the CNMI. SaipanSucks.com held its own domain between 2001 and September 2014 but later moved to a subdomain.

Credited as "sticking a giant wrench" into the CNMI's entire tourism industry and the island government's efforts to recruit off-island talent for over more than a decade, the website and its commentary has been reported in a variety of local, regional, and international newsprint and magazine outlets, on ABC Radio Australia, and Internet forums and blogs.

The website became a subject of intense debate and scrutiny in the CNMI legislature and by the island's governor, who together threatened the author with a defamation lawsuit. Lacking adequate grounds and likely fearing legal discovery in any attempt, the government's lawsuit never came to fruition after a counterclaim.

SaipanSucks.com's author is celebrated in the 2012 novel The Master Blaster by author and former Saipan Peace Corps Volunteer P. F. Kluge.

== Content ==
Image of one of the dozens of variants of the Saipan Sucks logo. Other versions contain different sayings under the main caption "Welcome to Saipan". The website also makes available for purchase t-shirts and other paraphernalia featuring the logo and above saying.

Saipan Sucks calls attention to what it alleges to be systemic societal problems in the CNMI that are supported by misuse of United States taxpayer money. Press outlets have widely quoted the following excerpt from the website:

Nepotism rules on the islands. Fueled by money paid by American taxpayers and diverted to the far-off territory, politicians run for office primarily for the sake of being in a position to appoint their relatives to high-paying sinecures.

The website levels allegations of corruption, racism, nepotism, jury-rigging, worker exploitation, employment discrimination, and mismanagement of the CNMI tourism industry by local CNMI officials, and seeks to warn U.S. mainlanders about moving to the islands to accept employment offers.

== Criticism ==
Since July 2001, shortly after Saipan Sucks was published, CNMI government officials criticized the website's anonymity and characterized it as a "smear campaign". Stemming from its reported investigations, the CNMI government threatened to sue the website's author for defamation but ultimately lacked adequate grounds to do so. The website author's response to the CNMI government was to state that they have "apparently never heard of the First Amendment to the United States Constitution … Is it possible the investigators don't recognize political and social commentary when they see it?"

In November 2006, a local environmental group, Beautify CNMI!, decried the website's high PageRank in search engines such as Google, and the fact that anyone who searches with the keyword "Saipan" could find the website in the top-ten search result positions. The group published an ultimately unsuccessful plan to counter the website's ranking through a campaign of linkspamming via Google bombing and text anchoring.

All along, counter-critics who are either Chamorros (indigenous people of Saipan) or those otherwise knowledgeable about the CNMI have maintained that, although Saipan Sucks uses hyperbole as a literary device, what it states is either legally true or subject to opinion privilege.

== Author ==
Saipan Sucks was written by a person or persons going by the pseudonym "Forgetabilia". Reported investigations carried out by the CNMI government in July 2001 led to an alleged claim about a real identity behind this persona. Later, on November 16, 2006, a CNMI daily alleged that Saipan Sucks was written by a former CNMI Assistant Attorney General, who the daily reported as having "disliked his position" in the CNMI. The same day, a regional publication denied the claim, reiterating that the author or authors remain anonymous. Saipan Sucks closes by stating, "As for the authors of this essay, our days in Micronesia have ended … In all likelihood we shall remain happily for the rest of our days ensconced in anonymous Longnesia, suffering, with a little luck, from a selective am-nesia. Hence our name – Forgetabilia."

As of September 10, 2014, the website was no longer available at its unique domain, SaipanSucks.com, but was re-published at saipansucks.weebly.com.

== See also ==
- Anonymity and politics
- Demographics of the Northern Mariana Islands
- Economy of the Northern Mariana Islands
- Garapan
- Gripe site
- Micronesia
- Northern Mariana Islands Territory Constitution
- Northern Marianas College
- P.F. Kluge
- Politics of the Northern Mariana Islands
- United Nations Trust Territories
