= Saipan Tribune =

Newspaper in the Northern Mariana Islands

- Type: Daily newspaper
- Owner: Tan Holdings Corporation
- Founder(s): Mark Pangelinan and Larry Hillbloom
- Founded: 1990
- Headquarters: 2nd Floor, JP Center, Beach Road
- City: Garapan, Saipan
- Website: www.saipantribune.com

The Saipan Tribune was a newspaper published online seven days a week and in print from Monday to Friday in the Northern Mariana Islands. It ceased operations on December 31, 2024. The Saipan Tribune was headquartered in Saipan. The newspaper was owned by Saipan Tribune Inc., formerly known as Pacific Publications and Printing Inc., which is an affiliate of the Tan Holdings Corporation. Its main competitor was the Marianas Variety News & Views.

== History ==
The newspaper was founded by Mark Pangelinan and Larry Hillbloom in 1990. The Saipan Tribune was sold in 1993 to Pacific Publication & Printing Inc., an affiliate of Tan Holdings Corp. In October 2024, newspaper announced it will cease operations on Dec. 31.

== See also ==
- List of newspapers in the Northern Mariana Islands
