= Northern Marianas Department of Corrections =

Government department of the Northern Mariana Islands

Northern Marianas Department of Corrections is an executive agency of the Northern Mariana Islands government. As of 2015 Robert A. Guerrero is the commissioner. It operates one prison, which as of April 2015 had 60 prison guards and 185 prisoners; the prison was at 66% occupancy. That month Guerrero stated that the prison had a staffing shortage and asked for a new training facility for corrections officers.

== See also ==
- Northern Mariana Islands Department of Public Safety
