= Politics of the Northern Mariana Islands =

Politics of the Northern Mariana Islands takes place in a framework of a presidential representative democratic system, whereby the Governor is head of government, and of a pluriform multi-party system. The Northern Mariana Islands is an unincorporated territory of the United States, and in a political union with it in the form of a commonwealth. Executive power is exercised by the governor. Legislative power is vested in the two chambers of the legislature. The judiciary is independent of the executive and the legislature. Local government is carried out through four regional mayors.

The Northern Mariana Islands and the United States of America reached a Covenant Agreement which became fully effective on November 4, 1986. The Constitution of the Commonwealth of the Northern Mariana Islands became effective on January 1, 1978.

== Executive branch ==
Main office-holders
Office	Name	Party	Since
Governor	Dave Apatang	Independent	July 23, 2025
Lieutenant Governor	Dennis Mendiola	Republican	July 23, 2025

=== Department Level Cabinet Positions ===
Department	Head	Political Party	Tenure
Department of Finance	Secretary David DLG. Atalig		
Department of Community and Cultural Affairs	Secretary Robert Hunter		
Department of Labor	Secretary Vicky Benavente		
Department of Lands and Natural Resources	Secretary Anthony T. Benavente		
Department of Commerce	Secretary Mark O. Rabauliman		
Department of Corrections	Commissioner Ramon C. Mafnas		
Office of Planning and Development	Secretary James Ada	Republican Party	
Department of Public Safety	Commissioner Robert A. Guerrero		
Office of the Attorney General	Attorney General Joey San Nicolas		2012
Department of Public Lands	Secretary Marianne Concepcion-Teregeyo		
Office of the Public Defender	Public Defender Doug Hartig		

=== Sub-cabinet level divisions and offices ===
Office or division	Head	Political Party	Tenure
Administrative Office	Special Assistant for Administration Mathilda A. Rosario		
Public Information and Protocol Office	Press Secretary Kevin Bautista		
Liaison Office			
Programs and Legislative Review Office	Special Assistant Victoria Guerrero		

== Legislative branch ==
The Northern Mariana Islands Commonwealth Legislature has two chambers. The House of Representatives has 20 members, elected for a two-year term from seven districts. The Senate has 9 members, elected for a four-year term in two staggered classes.

Prior to January 2009, the Commonwealth maintained an elected "Resident Representative" in Washington, DC. As authorized by Pub. L. 110–229 (text) (PDF), the Commonwealth now elects a nonvoting delegate to the U.S. Congress, similar to other U.S. insular areas. The first election was held on November 4, 2008.

== Judicial branch ==
Commonwealth Supreme Court; Superior Court; Federal District Court

== Federal representation ==
In November 2008, the Northern Mariana Islands held its first election for a delegate to the United States Congress. Gregorio "Kilili" Sablan won the election, and began his term of office in January 2009. The delegate serves as a member to some House committees and may vote in those committees, but the delegate is not permitted to vote on bills up for vote among all members of the House.

== International organization participation ==
- United Nations Economic and Social Commission for Asia and the Pacific (associate)
- INTERPOL (subbureau)
- Pacific Community

== Political culture ==
Historically the Northern Mariana Islands have been subject to the colonizing powers of Spain, Germany, Japan, and the United States under a United Nations Trust Territory of the Pacific Islands Agreement. Each power contributed elements that mixed with local indigenous cultures to form the current political culture of the Northern Mariana Islands.

United States citizenship was granted in 1986. Politics in the Northern Mariana Islands is often "more a function of family relationships and personal loyalties" where the size of one's extended family is more important than a candidate's personal qualifications. Both scholarly works and the authors of the controversial website Saipansucks.com charge that this is nepotism carried out within the trappings of democracy.

== See also ==
- Impeachment in the Northern Mariana Islands
