= List of lakes of the Northern Mariana Islands =

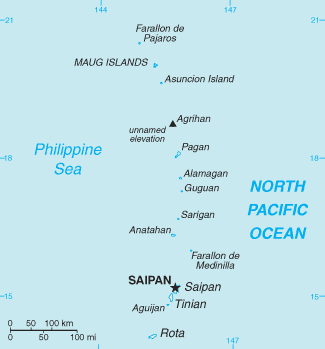
An enlargeable map of the Commonwealth of the Northern Mariana Islands

The Northern Mariana Islands the Commonwealth of the Northern Mariana Islands. CNMI is an insular area and commonwealth of the United States consisting of 14 islands in the northwestern Pacific Ocean.

== Lakes and ponds ==
- Lake Susupe Saipan
- Laguna Sanhalom (Inner Lake) Pagan (island)
- Laguna Sanhiyon (also Laguna Lake) Pagan (island)
- Lake Hagoi Tinian
