= Scouting in the Northern Mariana Islands =

- Aloha Council:Northern Marianas
- Website alohacouncilbsa.org

Scouting in the Northern Mariana Islands is in a state of development and growth. Scouting has existed in the islands since at least the 1970s, and may have been developed as early as the 1950s.

== Background ==
The Boy Scouts of America have been active in the Northern Mariana Islands for decades, as part of the Pacific Basin District of the Aloha Council. Its Order of the Arrow lodge is Nā Mokupuni O Lawelawe Lodge #567.

For Girl Scouts, there are USA Girl Scouts Overseas in Rota, Tinian, and Gregorio T. Camacho Elementary School on Saipan, served by the USAGSO headquarters in New York.
