= List of newspapers in the Northern Mariana Islands =

This is a list of newspapers in the Northern Mariana Islands.

- Marianas Business Journal – Saipan
- Marianas Variety News & Views – Saipan
- Saipan Tribune – Saipan

Other regional newspapers:

- Pacific Daily News – Guam
- Palau Horizon – Palau
