= Geology of the Northern Mariana Islands =

The geology of the Northern Mariana Islands began to form with undersea volcanic eruptions in the Eocene. Islands such as Saipan show a variety of rock types including volcanic rocks, breccia, tuff, conglomerate, sandstone, clay and extensive limestones.

== Geologic history, stratigraphy and tectonics ==
The bulk of geological research in the Northern Mariana Islands has focused on the large, populous island of Saipan. The U.S. Geological Survey first mapped the island in 1956 and it was remapped again in 2007.

The oldest rocks exposed at the surface are Eocene volcanic rocks, belonging to the Izu-Bonin-Mariana (IBM) arc system. Saipan is on the frontal arc of the system and experienced periodic uplift and subsidence since then. Volcaniclastic and carbonate rocks overly the IBM volcanics.

The Sankakuyama Formation is the oldest individual rock unit, which includes Eocene rhyolite found mainly on north-central part of the island. Radiometric dating gives an age of 45 million years ago. During mapping in 1956, it was subdivided into flow rock, breccia, tuff and pyroclastic rocks.

Originally called the Hagman andesite by R. Tayama during initial research efforts in 1938, the Hagman Formation is exposed as cliffs along the Hagman Peninsula and deposited during the early development of the Mariana fore arc. The andesite lava flows, conglomerate and sandstone of the unit date to between 26 and 28 million years ago, during the Oligocene. The Densinyama Formation includes andesitic breccia, conglomerate, tuff sandstone and tuff limestone, centered around Mount Talafofo and discontinuously exposed by Achuguo Spring in the west. It overlies the Hagman Formation and is present close to Papago.

The Matansa Limestone grades laterally to a pure shallow-marine limestone and like other units shows conflicting results when biostratigraphy and isotope dating are compared. The Tagpochau Limestone is the second most extensive rock unit near the surface on Saipan after the Mariana Limestone. It include a limestone, marl and tuff facies.

Calcareous marine tuff and interbedded volcanic flow rocks near the village of As Lito and the Fina Sisu hills was named the Fina-sisu Formation in 1956. The tuff is well bedded with numerous plankton fossils. Geologists have inferred that the rock formed during the Oligocene and is overlain by the Tagpochau Limestone.

The Donni Sandstone Member of the Tagpochau Limestone is informally known as the Donni formation. It is exposed near the village of I Donni and throughout the eastern end of the island. The formation overtops the Miocene Tagpochau rocks with an angular unconformity. Talus, marsh sediments and limestones such as the Mariana Limestone are common across the surface, resulting from deposition and mass-wasting during the Pleistocene and Holocene.

== Structural geology ==
Normal faults are common on the island, particularly the Angingan fault which places Fina-sisu Formation volcanic rocks against younger limestones. Geologists have identified breccia near Mount Tapkpochao as the trace of a normal fault. The Angingan, Obyan and Dago faults may be part of a larger, anastomosing fault system, running on both sides of the central highlands and connecting with faults in the area of Suicide Cliffs and Fanonchuluyan Bay. Most faults trend north-south and even young rocks from the Holocene show signs of offset.
