= Geography of the Northern Mariana Islands =

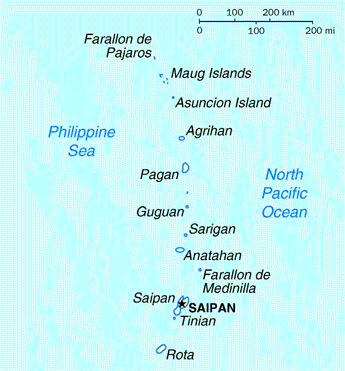
Map of the Northern Mariana Islands.

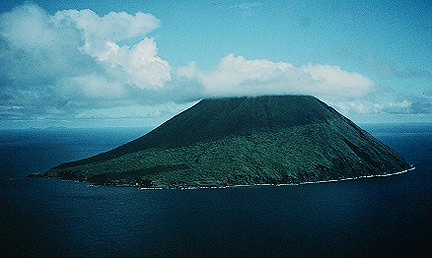
Asuncion Island.

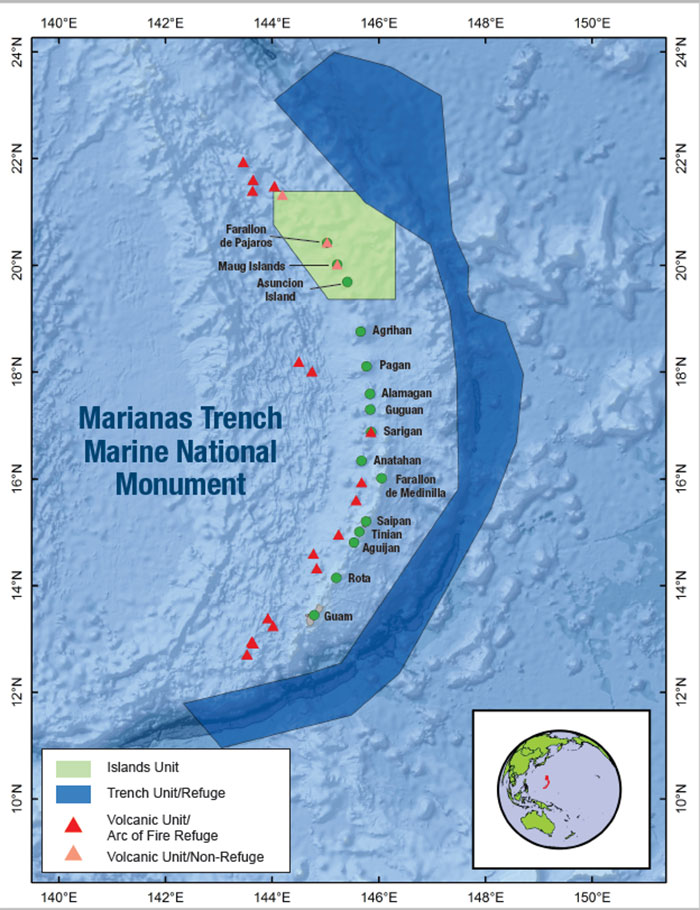
The Marianas Trench, with some of deepest ocean on the planet wraps around the Northern Mariana's and is National Marine Monument since 2009

The Northern Mariana Islands, together with Guam to the south, compose the Mariana Islands. The southern islands are limestone, with level terraces and fringing coral reefs. The northern islands are volcanic, with active volcanoes on Anatahan, Pagan and Agrihan. The volcano on Agrihan has the highest elevation at 3,166 feet (965 m). About one-fifth of the land is arable; another tenth is pasture. The primary natural resource is fish, some of which are endangered species, which leads to conflict. Also, development has created landfills which have contaminated the groundwater on Saipan, which could lead to disease.

Anatahan Volcano is a small volcanic island 80 miles (130 km) north of Saipan. It is about 6 miles (10 km) long and 2 miles (3 km) wide. Anatahan began erupting suddenly from its east crater on May 10, 2003, at about 6 p.m. local time (08:00 UTC). It has since alternated between eruptive and calm periods. On April 6, 2005, approximately 50,000 cubic meters (1,800,000 cu ft) of ash and rock were ejected, causing a large, black cloud to drift south over Saipan and Tinian.

== Climate ==
The islands have a tropical marine climate moderated by seasonal northeast trade winds. There is little seasonal temperature variation. The dry season runs from December to June, and the rainy season from July to November and can include typhoons. The Guinness Book of World Records has cited Saipan as having the most equable climate in the world. From 1927 to 1935, the temperature ranged from 19.6 °C (67.3 °F) at the lowest to 31.4 °C (88.5 °F) at the highest.

Climate data for Saipan International Airport (Köppen Af/Am)
Month	Jan	Feb	Mar	Apr	May	Jun	Jul	Aug	Sep	Oct	Nov	Dec	Year
Record high °F (°C)	89 (32)	90 (32)	91 (33)	93 (34)	96 (36)	94 (34)	99 (37)	95 (35)	94 (34)	92 (33)	92 (33)	90 (32)	99 (37)
Mean daily maximum °F (°C)	84.1 (28.9)	84.0 (28.9)	84.9 (29.4)	87.1 (30.6)	88.2 (31.2)	88.4 (31.3)	87.8 (31.0)	87.2 (30.7)	87.2 (30.7)	86.6 (30.3)	86.5 (30.3)	85.7 (29.8)	86.5 (30.3)
Daily mean °F (°C)	79.5 (26.4)	79.1 (26.2)	80.0 (26.7)	82.0 (27.8)	83.1 (28.4)	83.4 (28.6)	82.9 (28.3)	82.4 (28.0)	82.2 (27.9)	81.8 (27.7)	81.9 (27.7)	81.0 (27.2)	81.6 (27.6)
Mean daily minimum °F (°C)	74.8 (23.8)	74.1 (23.4)	75.2 (24.0)	76.9 (24.9)	78.0 (25.6)	78.5 (25.8)	78.1 (25.6)	77.5 (25.3)	77.2 (25.1)	77.1 (25.1)	77.3 (25.2)	76.4 (24.7)	76.8 (24.9)
Record low °F (°C)	70 (21)	69 (21)	69 (21)	70 (21)	73 (23)	72 (22)	71 (22)	69 (21)	72 (22)	69 (21)	69 (21)	69 (21)	69 (21)
Average rainfall inches (mm)	3.65 (93)	2.50 (64)	1.96 (50)	2.75 (70)	3.12 (79)	4.24 (108)	7.43 (189)	12.86 (327)	11.42 (290)	10.72 (272)	5.21 (132)	3.78 (96)	69.64 (1,769)
Average rainy days (≥ 0.01 in)	17.4	15.3	14.2	16.4	17.9	20.2	24.3	23.9	23.3	24.5	20.7	18.9	237.0
Source: NOAA

== See also ==
- Extreme points of the Northern Mariana Islands
- Marianas Trench Marine National Monument
