= List of Superfund sites in the Northern Mariana Islands =

This is a list of Superfund sites in the Northern Mariana Islands designated under the Comprehensive Environmental Response, Compensation, and Liability Act (CERCLA) environmental law:

CERCLIS ID	Name	Location	Reason	Proposed	Listed	Construction completed	Partially deleted	Deleted
MPD980798318	PCB Warehouse	Garapan, Saipan	21 drums of polychlorinated biphenyl wastes and 3 crates of sodium arsenite were removed from the island and disposed of at a facility in the continental United States.	12/30/1982	09/08/1983	03/07/1986	N/A	03/07/1986

== See also ==
- List of Superfund sites in the United States
- List of environmental issues
- List of waste types
- TOXMAP
