= Seal of the Northern Mariana Islands =

Official government emblem of the U.S. territory of Northern Mariana Islands

- Armiger: Government of the Northern Mariana Islands
- Adopted: 1978, 1990 (modified)

The Seal of the Northern Mariana Islands draws its inspiration from the United Nations, as the NMI was formerly a UN Trust Territory.

== History ==
The seal of the Northern Mariana Islands shows a latte-stone charged with a five pointed star, surrounded by a garland of flowers. Below are the words "UNITED STATES 1976 OFFICIAL SEAL". The legend reads "COMMONWEALTH OF THE NORTHERN MARIANAS".

The seal was adopted in 1978 and modified in 1990. Recently a somewhat simplified form has shown up on which the words "United States, 1976" are omitted. This version is mainly used by the police forces.

== Design ==
The seal has a blue background, symbolizing the Pacific Ocean, with a white star at the center representing the United States. The star is superimposed on a gray latte stone, a foundation stone used in traditional Chamorro buildings. The decorative head wreath, or mwarmwar, incorporates four types of flowers and is a nod to Carolinian culture.

== Gallery ==
Former seal of the Northern Mariana Islands (1978–1990)

== See also ==
- Flag of the Northern Mariana Islands
