= Education in the Northern Mariana Islands =

Education in Commonwealth of the Northern Mariana Islands
16th State Board of Education
- BOE Chairperson BOE Vice Chairperson BOE Secretary/Treasurer BOE Member BOE Member: Janice A. Tenorio, M.Ed. Herman M. Atalig, SGM (Ret) MaryLou S. Ada, J.D. Andrew L. Orsini Phillip Mendiola-Long, AIFA, RF

General details
- Primary languages: English, Chamorro, Carolinian
- System type: State
- Established: 1988

Education in the Northern Mariana Islands is linked to the United States Department of Education as the Northern Mariana Islands form part of the United States Commonwealth. This encompasses the sectors of pre-K, elementary schools, middle schools, high schools and college education. The main governing body in the region is the Commonwealth of the Northern Mariana Islands Public School System (CNMI PSS) whose headquarters are located on Capital Hill, Saipan. Currently, there are 20 schools operating within the CNMI PSS. There are also a number of private and home school systems operating in the region. The educational system follows a similar model to the United States educational system whereby children between the ages of 5-16 are mandated to attend formal school. All educational institutions, systems and budget are governed first by the US Board of Education, followed by the Northern Mariana Islands State Board of Education, which was established in 1988 as a requirement of the Northern Mariana Islands Constitution.

== History ==
Education in the Northern Mariana Islands has historically been determined by the different foreign powers that assumed ownership over the native Chamorro society. The first attempt at a formalised education system occurred in 1668 when a small party of Spanish Jesuit missionaries arrive in Guam on 16 June 1668. With their primary objective being to convert the population to Christianity, they established a school for reading and prayers for a select group of boys.

On 20 June 1898, the US naval convoy took control of Guam, although the possession was not officially legalised until 10 December of the same year. Within the same year, Germany bought the remaining islands from the Spanish. The two governments both completed an overhaul of the existing education systems, but approached it in very different ways. The Germans concerned themselves with the commercial value of the islands and established schooling as a way of training a cheap labour force. The Americans, however, focused their educational overhaul on teaching American values, language and customs. This was completed under the expectations that the Chamorro people could then fully immerse in American culture, and thus could easily earn United States citizenship.

The German ceded control of the remaining islands to the Japanese shortly after the beginning of World War I. The Japanese government then established their own educational policy, which differed greatly from the American and German attempts at policy, and introduced the Japanese language to students. Through all of these changes in educational policies, the islands ended up with a complex mix of language establishments as schools across the region either spoke Japanese, English, Chamorro, or Spanish.

In 1922, Guam (which was still under the American administration) adopted the Californian educational system, which taught students both local and American history, and local and global geography through American textbooks. 22 years later, in 1944, this education system was disseminated across all of the islands, and the divide between administrations was removed when the United States officially took possession of the region. In 1975, the Commonwealth of the Northern Mariana Islands was formed as a U.S. Territory. The U.S. held the islands under the Trust and Territory of the Pacific Islands (TTPI) which required them to establish systems of self-government, which included an education system. Established by the U.S. Navy, this system took the form of a kindergarten to grade 8 schooling system and operated for six days a week. The main language of instruction had then moved to English which formed the basis of the current 21st century educational system.

== Organisation and Structure ==
The organisation and structure of the Northern Mariana Islands educational system is similar to that of the United States. There are currently multiple levels of government overseeing the education system in the region. Along with the US Board of Education, there is also the Northern Mariana Islands State Board of Education, which was established in 1988 as a requirement of the Northern Mariana Islands Constitution. The board is made up of five elected members who are representatives from the three senatorial districts of Northern Mariana Islands – three from Saipan, one from Tinian, and one from Rota. Additionally, there are also three governor-appointed non-voting members – a student representative, a non-public school representative and a teacher representative. The universal measure used to assess student outcome is the Stanford Achievement Test 9 (SAT9).

=== Public Education ===
In 1977, the CNMI State Board of Education established the Commonwealth of the Northern Mariana Islands Public School System (CNMI PSS) who oversee the state preschool, elementary and secondary schools. The CNMI PSS functions at the state and local level of education and is the only institution that provides public education in the region. Funding for the public system comes from both U.S. Federal assistance and local government. In the 2008 fiscal year, the CNMI PSS public budget was $69,017,086 and in the 2015 fiscal year, they received an estimated $35.6 million from federal funding. Schooling is compulsory for all children between the ages of 6 and 16, yet there are further education opportunities for children outside of this age range. There are 9 elementary schools, 7 middle schools, and 6 high schools within the CNMI PSS. Early childhood education is run through the Head Start program that provides services to children at ages birth to three.

=== Private Education ===
There are 28 private schools operating in the Northern Mariana Islands, which includes primary and secondary stages, as well as religious and non-religious schools. Curriculum in non-public schools is determined by secular education services, paid for by the superintendent of education which includes; English, reading, social studies, music, mathematics, modern foreign languages, physical science, and physical education. As of 2017, there were no regulations from the US Department of Education regarding accreditation, teacher certification, length of school year, record keeping, testing or tax exemption.

=== Home Schooling ===
Home Education programs are operating as well and are subject the Commonwealth for the Northern Mariana Islands Administrative Code. To begin a home-study program, parents must submit an application 60 days prior to the beginning of the school year and receive a waiver from the commissioner of education. The student must complete 180 days of schooling a year and consist of 300 minutes of secular instruction each day. Records of attendance, goals and other information need to be kept and submitted to the Commissioner.

=== Special Education ===
From 1978 onwards, the Northern Mariana Islands began receiving funding for a special education program to implement within the public school system. This includes a special education department which oversees early intervention programs for ages birth to 3 years, old, an early childhood program incorporated within Head Start Schools and then programs that run through elementary school, high school and college. These programs are implemented under the 2004 Individuals with Disabilities Education Act (IDEA). In the 2014–2015 school year, 892 students utilised these services. The practices used in the special education services mainly revolve around adapting the content, methodology or instruction to suit the needs of the individual student and extend to practices like assistive technology, transition planning, and positive behaviour interventions.

== Funding and Legislations ==
In April 2012, Congressman Gregorio Kilili Camacho Sablan of the Northern Mariana Islands announced that the Northern Marianas College would be receiving an award of nearly $40,000 from that Interior Department's Office of Insular Affairs. This was awarded to the Technical Assistance Program as a support for the development of a new strategic plan for the college. Its main focus was to ensure that graduates were qualified to meet the needs of the local economy.

In 2018, Super Typhoon Yutu caused catastrophic damage to the islands of Tinian and Saipan, damaging multiple educational structures in the area. In a statement released by Glenn Muna, Commissioner of the Northern Mariana Islands Public School System, he revealed that half of the public schools were damaged by the natural disaster. Within this, there were five schools that required major repair to classrooms including replacing doors and windows, rewiring and re-roofing the building, replacing students chairs, desks, computers and other supplies. The largest middle school in the area, Hopwood, had to conduct their classes within insecure tents, meaning that 918 students had to attend school within 42 tents. The schools that were the least damaged had to conduct classes in double sessions, meaning that students would attend only half the day so other sets of students could attend the second half of the day. At the time of the Glenn Muna's statement, they had spent around $1.8 million on cleaning up debris and using the schools as typhoon shelters. As a result of this, the US Department of Education announced they would grant $9.3 million to rebuilding the CNMI Public School System infrastructure, and $21.9 million to the Northern Marianas College. This aimed to cover the costs of restarting school operations and ensuring teacher retention rates within the systems. On August 29, 2019, the Department of Education awarded $4 million of the promised $9.3 million to immediate recovery within the CNMI Public School System.

In May 2019, the Northern Mariana Islands and American Samoa College Access Act was announced by Congressman Gregorio Kilili Camacho Sablan of the Northern Mariana Islands, and Congresswoman Aumua Amata of American Samoa. This bipartisan act focused on tuition assistance grants for students in the islands. The main aim was to bridge the financial gap between in-state and out-of-state tuition costs for students seeking to complete a degree in a public university. The motivating reasons for this act were due to poverty concerns as the 2019 household incomes in the Northern Marianas were less than half the national poverty median.

In May 2020, it was announced that the Northern Mariana Islands would be receiving a total of $28 million to go towards education in the area. This came as a response to the COVID-19 pandemic in efforts to prepare schools adequately to deal with the ramifications of the pandemic on schooling. Overseen by the Trump administration, this was welcomed as part of the CARES Act federal fund and its subdivision Education Stabilization Fund. This program aims to support K-12 and higher education in the United States territories by distributing needs-based funds, as it is determined by the Secretary of Education Betsy DeVos. The Commonwealth of the Northern Mariana Islands received $29.8 million in this emergency relief fund to help minimise the impact on the educational systems.

== Issues and Criticisms ==
There are a number of academics and policy-makers that have critically engaged with different parts of the Northern Mariana Islands educational system and curriculum.

Some argue that the way education is framed in the Northern Mariana Islands needs to be culturally responsive and sensitive to the history of colonisation on the islands. There are calls for the colonial relationship between the United States and the islands to be critically discussed in schools in an attempt to minimise the effect colonisation has on students' civic life. The history of colonialism has had an effect on the way curriculum is decided, the intentions of curriculum, and bringing in expatriate teachers that are unfamiliar with local culture. As a solution to these problems, academics propose utilising the backgrounds, knowledges and experiences of students within the creation of curriculum. This concern has also been raised in regards to the social studies curriculum which is prescribed by the US organisation The National Council for Social Studies. The concern surrounds the implementation of a democratic citizenship education that assures competence in mainland American civic values instead of local civic values.

According to one study, Pacific Islander children are nine times more likely to be overweight than white children. This increased risk has sparked discussion about better ways to incorporate physical activity in schools, and increasing knowledge of healthy lifestyle choices. Sports, Play, and Active Recreation for Kids (SPARK) is an American-derived intervention program for tackling obesity within schools and was tested within the CNMI Public School System. Overall, it was proven to increase physical activity by 10% per school year and has since been incorporated into curriculum discussions.
