= Music of the Northern Mariana Islands =

Gi Talo Gi Halom Tasi
- National anthem of Northern Mariana Islands
- Also known as: Satil Matawal Pacifico (English: In Carolinian )
- Music: Im Schoensten Wiesengrunde
- Adopted: 1996

The music of the Northern Mariana Islands is dominated by the folk music of the Chamorros, which remains an important part of the islands' culture, though elements of music left by American, German, Spanish and Japanese colonizers are also in evidence. There are both Carolinian and Chamorro traditional chant styles. A variant of the Spanish cha-cha-chá is popular, as is a Carolinian "stick dance" which combines improvised percussion and foot stomping. A well-known stick dance group is the Talabwog Men Stick Dancers.

The national anthem of the Northern Mariana Islands is "Gi Talo Gi Halom Tasi" (in Chamorro, "Satil Matawal Pacifico" in Carolinian), which was adopted in October 1996. The song's melody comes from a German tune, "Im Schoensten Wiesengrunde".

Music festivals in the Northern Mariana Islands include the Fiestan Luta, an annual celebration.
