= Northern Mariana Islands Department of Public Safety =

Law enforcement agency in Northern Mariana Islands

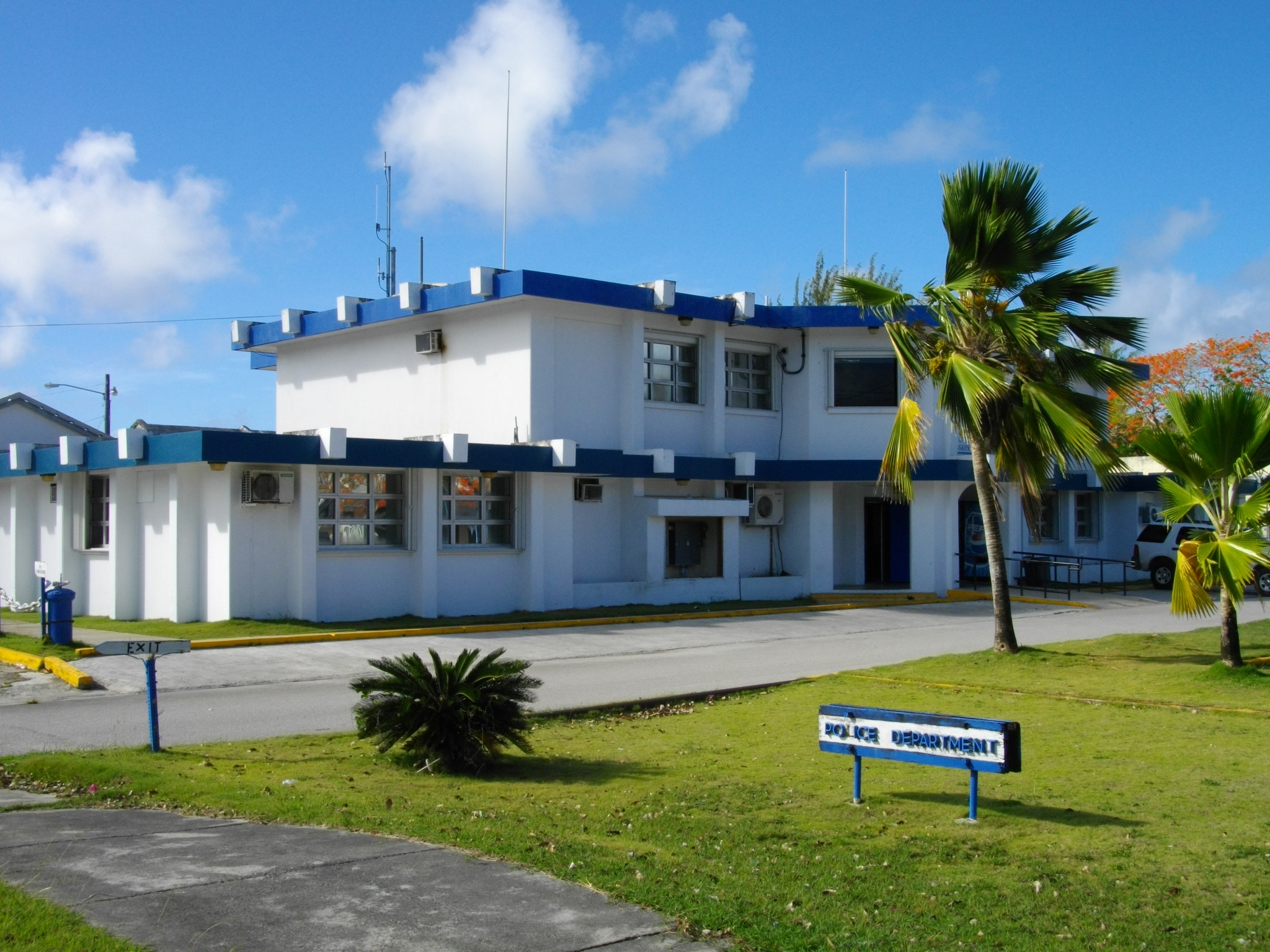
CNMI DPS Police Division Building in Susupe, Saipan

The Commonwealth of the Northern Mariana Islands Department of Public Safety (DPS; Chamorro: Dipåttamentun Sinåfu' Pupbliku; Carolinian: Bwulasiyol Alillisil Toulap) is a law enforcement agency and firefighting agency of the Northern Mariana Islands. It is one of the CNMI executive agencies, and as of 2015 its commissioner is Robert A. Guerrero.

The Department of Public Safety has two divisions, Police and Fire. Responsibility for corrections were under the jurisdiction of the DPS until administratively separated into its own department in 2005. The Northern Marianas also have Ports Authority Police that patrols all of the airports and seaports in the island chain. Conservation Officers are also armed law enforcement officers in the CNMI.

The Department of Public Safety's Traffic Section is composed of eleven police officers that make up the three teams who watch over the streets of Saipan, the central island of the Northern Mariana Islands. The three teams or units are Daily Enforcement, DUI and Traffic Investigation.

To date, three members of the department have died in the line of duty.

The divisions include:

- Criminal Investigation Division
- Division of Motor Vehicle
- Fire Division
- Police Division
- Rota DPS
- Tinian DPS

In 2014 the department began conducting drug tests of its officers.
