= Economy of the Northern Mariana Islands =

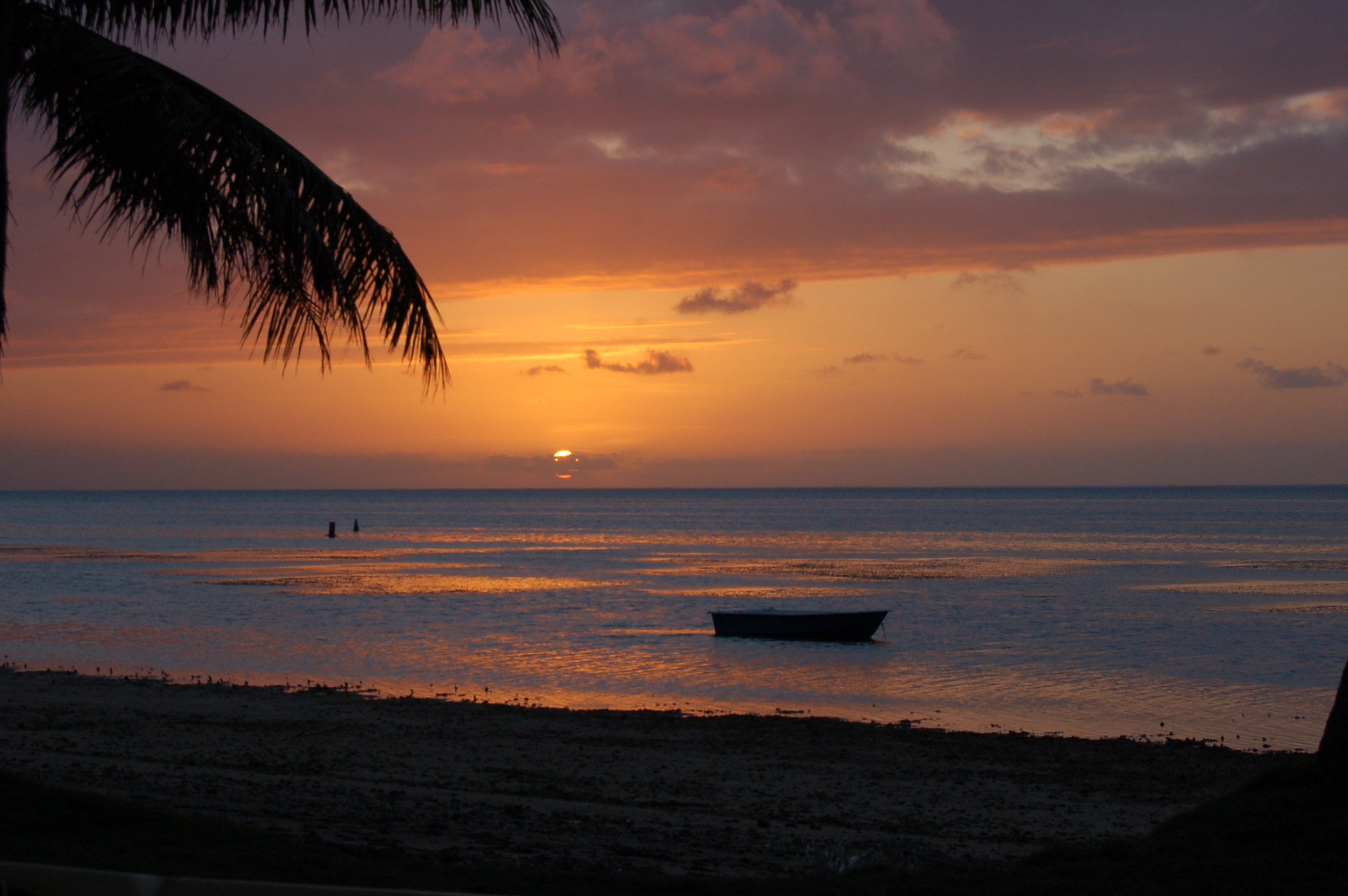
Saipan sunset

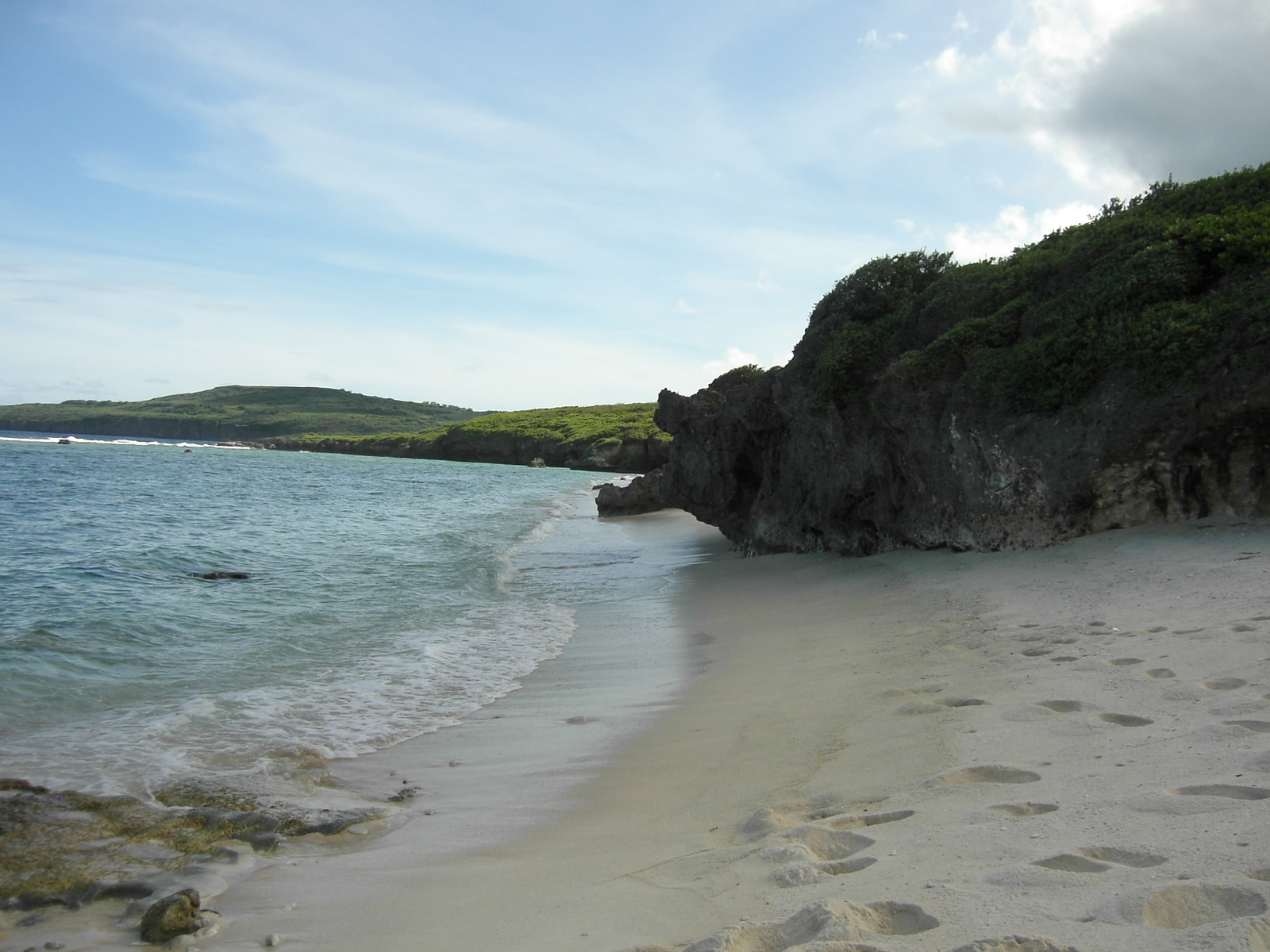
Long Beach, Tinian

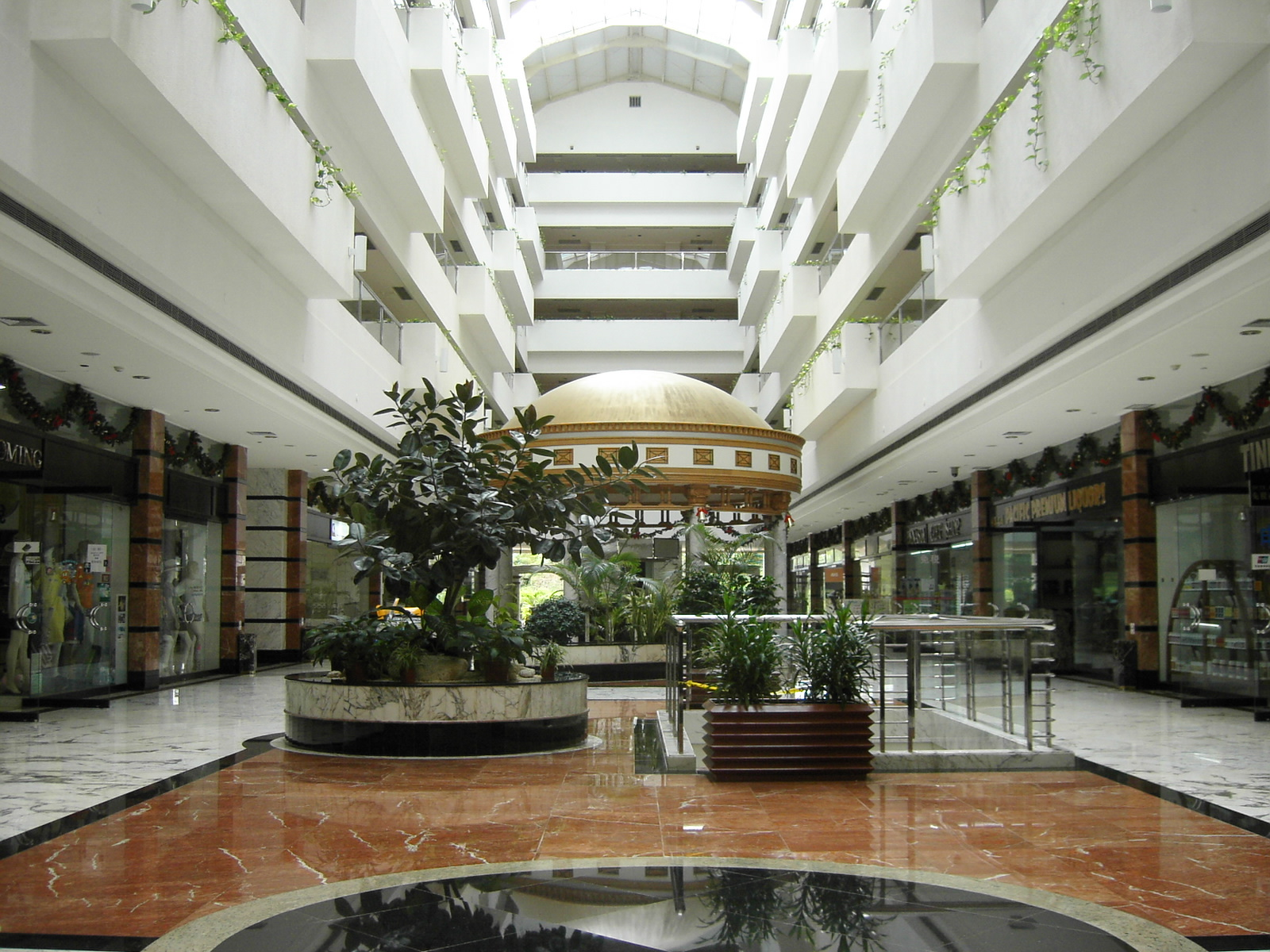
Tinian Hotel lobby

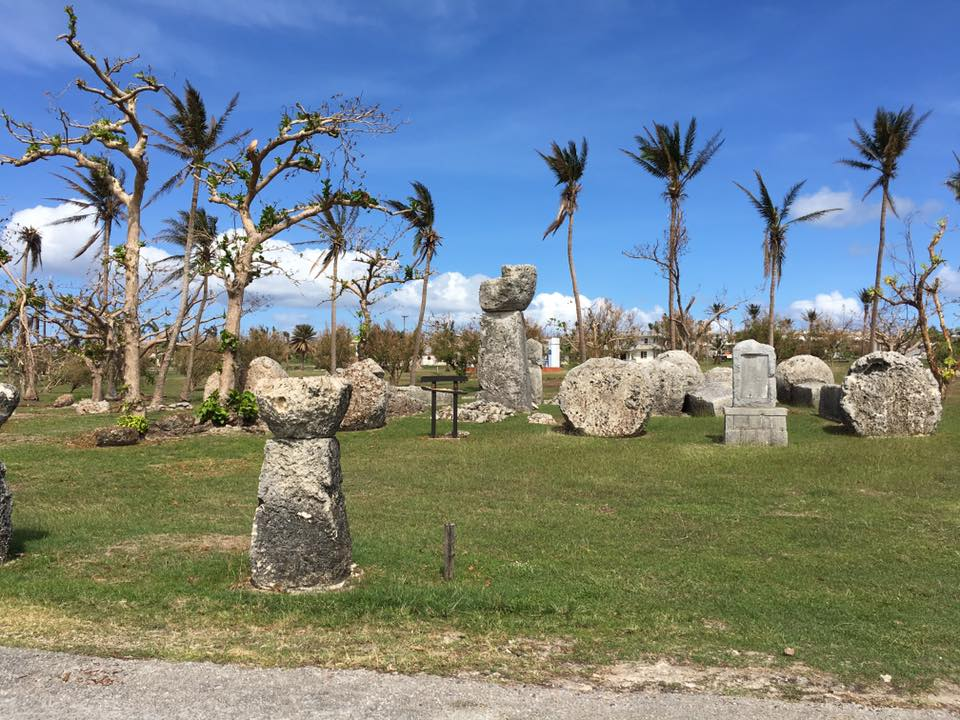
The ruins of the House of Taga stones

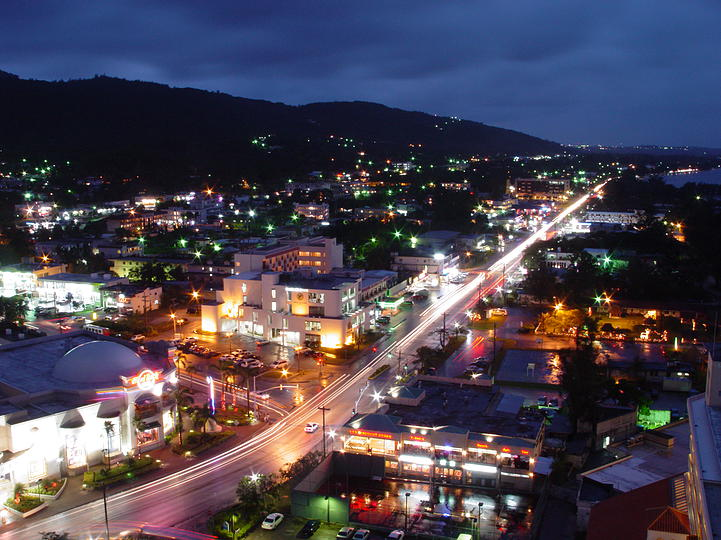
Saipan at night

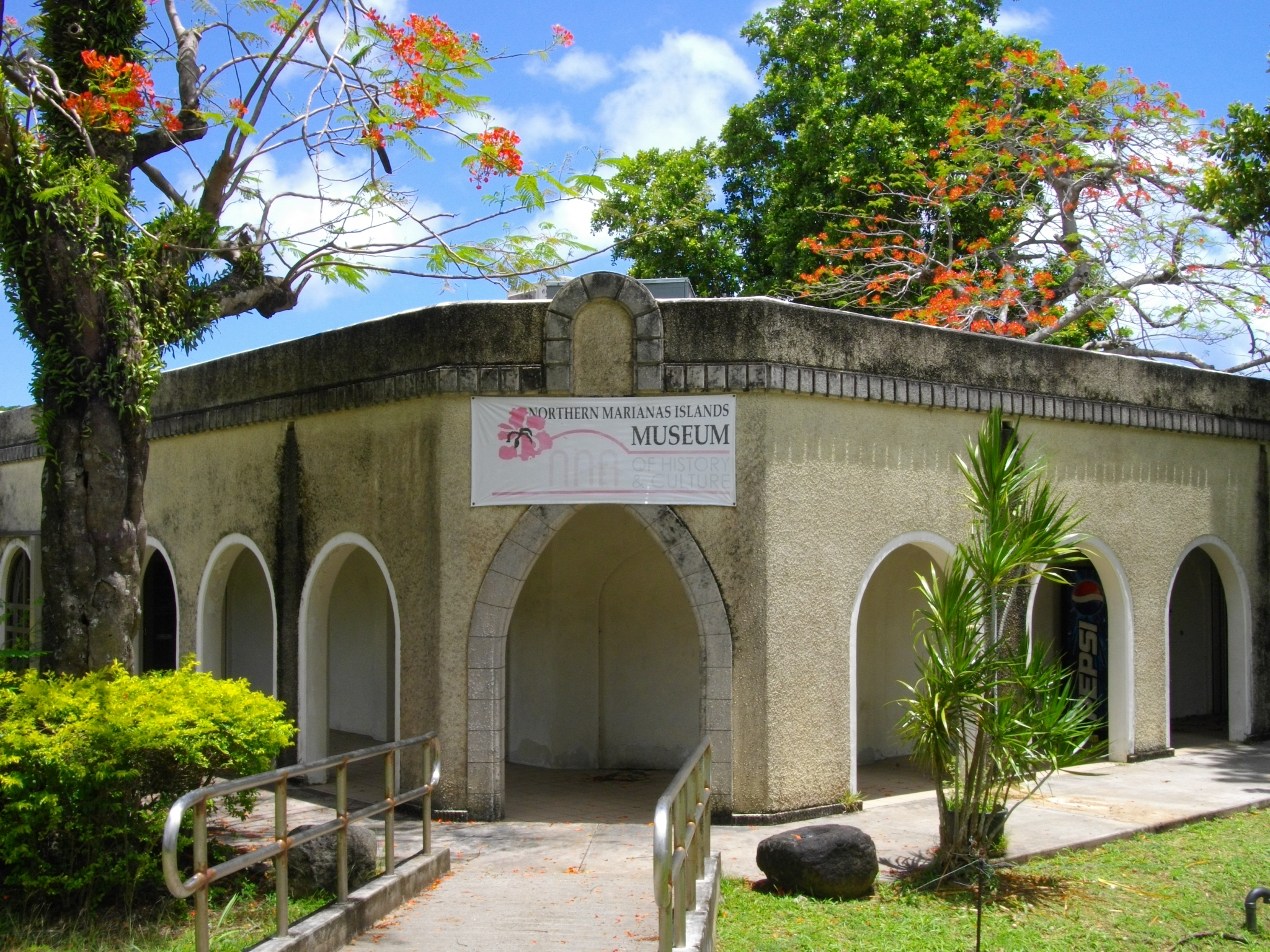
Northern Marianas Islands Museum

The economy of the Northern Mariana Islands benefits substantially from financial assistance from the United States and tourism. The rate of funding has declined as locally generated government revenues have grown. An agreement for the years 1986 to 1992 entitled the islands to $228 million for capital development, government operations, and special programs. Since 1992, funding has been extended one year at a time. The Commonwealth received funding of $11 million for infrastructure, for FY96/97 through FY02/03, with an equal local match.

== Tourism ==
The chief source of income is the volatile tourist industry, which employs well over half of the workforce. Chinese and Korean tourists predominate. The agricultural sector is of minor importance and is made up of cattle ranches and small farms producing coconuts, breadfruit, tomatoes, and melons.

The Marianas are noted for their beautiful beaches, one of the popular ones is Micro Beach on Saipan. Resorts allow tourists to engage in activities such as jungle walks, windsurfing, fishing, golfing, etc. One tourist site of interest is the prehistoric stone structures (see House of Taga). Touring the islands is a unique way to discover their history. Some popular festivals on the island are San Vicente Fiesta and San Antonio Festival.

The peak year for tourists was 1997, in which about 760,000 people visited. In 2018, also a popular year, 607,000 people visited the CNMI.

Tourism was strong in 2019, comprising visitors mainly from China and South Korea. Tourism dropped during the pandemic, and has been slow to recover since it ended. Direct flights from Japan have decreased, and the political issues between the US and China have stopped all flights from China (except from Hong Kong) to Saipan. CNMI hopes to attract tourists again from Japan, requiring direct flights to increase between Saipan and Japanese cities. The market in 2023 and 2024 for tourism is about half the 2019, pre-pandemic level, relying on tourists from South Korea. “The number of tourists recovered to over 194,600 in fiscal 2023 from some 5,370 in fiscal 2021 and about 69,530 in fiscal 2022 thanks to the return of South Koreans, according to the MVA data.” Some travel experts suggest that CNMI change its image from the low cost destination to a slightly fancier destination.

There are five golf courses on Saipan, including one designed by the golfer Greg Norman.

U.S. Citizens can visit CNMI without a passport.

== Textile industry ==
Garment production was an industry back then with the employment of 12,000 mostly Chinese workers and shipments of $1 billion to the United States in 1998 under duty and quota exemptions. This production is extremely controversial because goods produced in the North Marianas can be labeled "Made in the U.S.A.", although not all American labor laws apply to the commonwealth leading to what critics charge as "sweatshop conditions" for imported, mostly Asian, workers. Among other companies, the teen clothing store Abercrombie & Fitch has produced some of their clothing in the Northern Marianas and sold them for high prices.

The garment industry is changing, though, and many of the garment factories are closing due to the lifting of WTO trade restrictions on Chinese imports. The industry was initially established in the Commonwealth because some U.S. labor and immigration laws do not apply within the CNMI—for example, the CNMI's minimum wage rate of $6.05 per hour (for most employment positions) is lower than the federal rate, which applies to most other areas of the United States. Additionally, the CNMI retains local control over customs and immigration enforcement, unlike in Guam.

In the late 1990s a number of large American textile companies such as Calvin Klein, Tommy Hilfiger, and Sears were criticized for having manufactured clothes in sweatshop conditions in Saipan. In March 2000, a number of defendants, settled a class action suit brought by Saipanese garment workers, which had alleged mistreatment. As part of the settlement, which involved no admission of wrongdoing, Tommy Hilfiger and other companies agreed to independent oversight of their manufacturing in Saipan, a term refused by other defendants such as Lane Bryant and J.C. Penney.

In 2004 — and in response to a long and expensive class action lawsuit brought by garment workers against various clothing manufacturers — a Garment Oversight Board, aimed at protecting workers' rights, was created. These actions have reportedly resulted in improved conditions since the turn of the 21st century.

At its peak there were 34 garment factories, but they began closing in the early 2000s, especially after 2005 when the World Trade Organization removed quotas. The last 11 factories, which usually employed many overseas workers, shut down between 2008 and 2019. For example, one factory had 283 workers, 228 of which were foreign.

== Statistics ==
=== GDP ===
GDP: purchasing power parity – $524 million (1996 est.)
note: GDP numbers reflect US spending

GDP – real growth rate: NA%

GDP – per capita: purchasing power parity – $9,300 (1996 est.)

GDP – composition by sector:
agriculture: NA%
industry: NA%
services: NA%

=== Income ===
Population below poverty line: NA%

Household income or consumption by percentage share:
lowest 10%: NA%
highest 10%: NA%

Inflation rate (consumer prices): 6.5% (1994 est.)

=== Labor ===
Labor force: 6,006 total indigenous labor force; 2,699 unemployed; 28,717 foreign workers (1995)

Labor force – by occupation: managerial 20.5%, technical, sales 16.4%, services 19.3%, farming 3.1%, precision production 13.8%, operators, fabricators 26.9%

Unemployment rate: 14% (residents)

Budget:
revenues: $221 million
expenditures: $213 million, including capital expenditures of $17.7 million (1996)

=== Industry ===
Industries: tourism, construction, garments, handicrafts

Industrial production growth rate: NA%

=== Electricity ===
Electricity – production: NA kWh

Electricity – production by source:
fossil fuel: 100%
hydro: 0%
nuclear: 0%
other: 0%

Electricity – consumption: NA kWh

Electricity – exports: NA kWh

Electricity – imports: NA kWh

=== Agriculture ===
Agriculture – products: coconuts, fruits, vegetables, cattle

=== Exports/Imports ===
Exports of Northern Mariana Islands by product category (2019) Chemical products Transportation Machines Mineral products Plastics and rubbers Metals Foodstuffs Precious metals Textiles Instruments Animal products Vegetable products Paper goods Footwear and headwear Miscellaneous Stone and glass Wood products Animal and vegetable bi-products Animal hides Arts and antiques Weapons

Exports: $1 billion (1998)

Exports – commodities: garments

Exports – partners: US

Imports: $NA

Imports – commodities: food, construction equipment and materials, petroleum products

Imports – partners: US, Japan

Debt – external: $NA

Economic aid – recipient: $21.1 million (1995)

=== Currency ===
Currency: 1 United States dollar (US$) = 100 cents

Exchange rates: US currency is used

Fiscal year: 1 October – 30 September
