= Northern Mariana Islands Commonwealth Constitution =

The Constitution of the Commonwealth of the Northern Mariana Islands is the governing document of the United States Commonwealth of the Northern Mariana Islands ("CNMI"). Its creation was required by the covenant between the United States and the CNMI. It was drafted at a local constitutional convention in 1976, approved by territorial voters in a referendum on March 6, 1977, and became effective January 9, 1978.

The constitution has a 12-section bill of rights including "the right to a clean and healthful public environment in all areas, including the land, air, and water" (Article I, Section 9), recognition of the rights of victims of crime requiring that "restitution to the crime victim shall be a condition of probation and parole except upon a showing of compelling interest" (Section 11) and the rights of an unborn child with an absolute ban in the Commonwealth of an abortion of pregnancy "except as provided by law" (Section 12).

Article II provides for a 9-member Senate composed of three at-large members from each of three senatorial districts (Rota; Tinian and Aguiguan; and "Saipan and islands north of it") with Senators to have staggered four-year terms, and a 14-member House of Representatives. Article III provides for a directly-elected Governor and Lieutenant Governor with four-year terms, and Article IV states that the Commonwealth Supreme Court will have "a chief justice and at least two associate justices".

== Constitutional conventions ==
Following the first constitutional convention in 1976, a second constitutional convention was held in 1985. Voters in the commonwealth voted for 44 amendments proposed during the convention that year. In 1995, another constitutional convention was held, though voters did not approve any of the 19 proposed amendments.

In 2026, governor David M. Apatang pushed for a referendum on a new constitutional convention to be included in the 2026 general election. The question specified was “Shall there be a constitutional convention to propose amendments to the Constitution?” Despite majority support, the referendum fell short.
