= List of museums in the unincorporated territories of the United States =

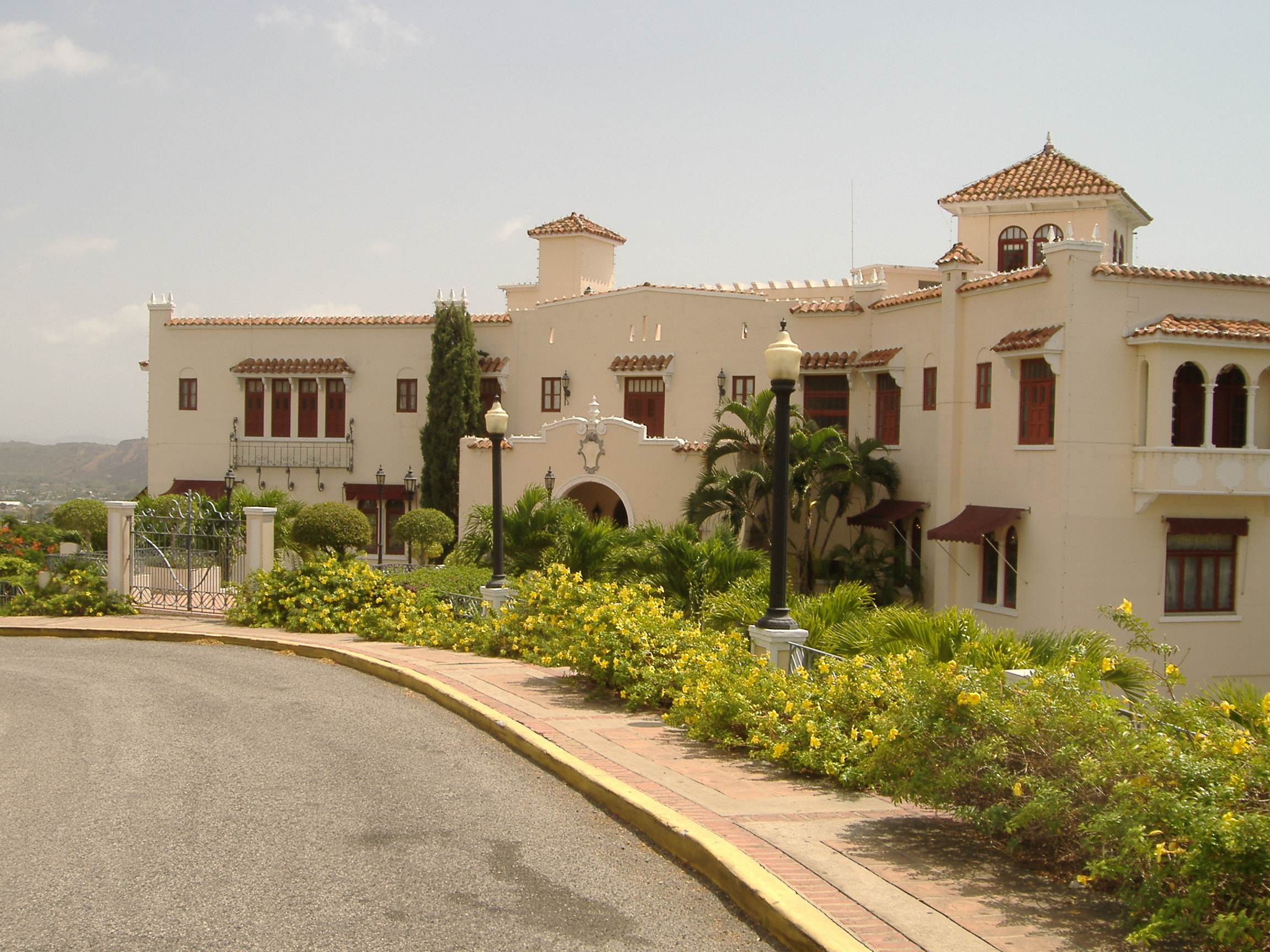
Serralles Castle museum in Ponce, Puerto Rico

This list of museums in the unincorporated territories of the United States encompasses museums defined for this context as institutions (including nonprofit organizations, government entities, and private businesses) that collect and care for objects of cultural, artistic, scientific, or historical interest and make their collections or related exhibits available for public viewing. Museums that exist only in cyberspace (i.e., virtual museums) are not included.

== U.S. territories ==
=== American Samoa ===
- Jean P. Haydon Museum — Pago Pago (museum about American Samoa)

=== Guam ===
- Guam Museum — Hagåtña website
- Isla Center for the Arts, University of Guam, website
- Marianas Military Museum at the U.S. Naval Station, website
- National Museum of the Dulce Nombre de Maria Cathedral-Basilica — Hagåtña
- Houamla Collection of African Arts — Yigo
- Pacific War Museum — Hagåtña
- Seaside Museum, a part of Jeff's Pirates Cove, a beach bar — Talofofo (Note: The museum contains "glass fish floats, stone tools, ifit wood sculptures, rare seashells, pottery, fine oil paintings, black coral and floating rocks" among other items.) Web page
- Senator Angel Leon Guerrero Santos Latte Stone Memorial Park — Hagåtña
- South Pacific Memorial Park — Yigo
- T. Stell Newman Visitor Center — Santa Rita
- War in the Pacific National Historical Park — Asan-Maina

=== Northern Mariana Islands ===
- American Memorial Park — Saipan
- Japanese Air Operations Building (and grounds) — Tinian
- Northern Mariana Islands Museum of History and Culture (NMI Museum) — Saipan
- World War 2 Museum — Saipan

=== Puerto Rico ===
See List of museums in Puerto Rico

=== U.S. Minor Outlying Islands ===
- World War II Facilities at Midway — Midway Atoll

=== Virgin Islands (U.S.) ===
- Caribbean Museum Center For The Arts — Frederiksted
- Christiansted Apothecary Hall — Christiansted, website
- Cinnamon Bay Interpretive Center — Cruz Bay
- Fort Christian — Charlotte Amalie
- Fort Frederik — Frederiksted
- French Heritage Museum — Charlotte Amalie
- Haagensen House — Charlotte Amalie
- Lawaetz Museum — Frederiksted website
- Pirate's Treasure Museum — Havensight
- Saint Thomas Historical Trust Museum — Charlotte Amalie
- The House That Freedom Built — Christiansted
- The Virgin Islands Children's Museum — Havensight
- Whim Plantation Museum (Estate Whim Sugar Mill) — Frederiksted, website

== See also ==
- List of museums
- List of museums in the United States
- National Register of Historic Places listings in American Samoa
- National Register of Historic Places listings in Guam
- National Register of Historic Places listings in the Northern Mariana Islands
- National Register of Historic Places listings in the U.S. Virgin Islands
- National Register of Historic Places listings in the United States Minor Outlying Islands
- List of United States National Historic Landmarks in the U.S. territories

=== Puerto Rico ===
- National Register of Historic Places listings in Puerto Rico
- Botanical gardens in Puerto Rico (category)
- Houses in Puerto Rico (category)
- Forts in Puerto Rico (category)
- Observatories in Puerto Rico (category)
