= Elvin Bell =

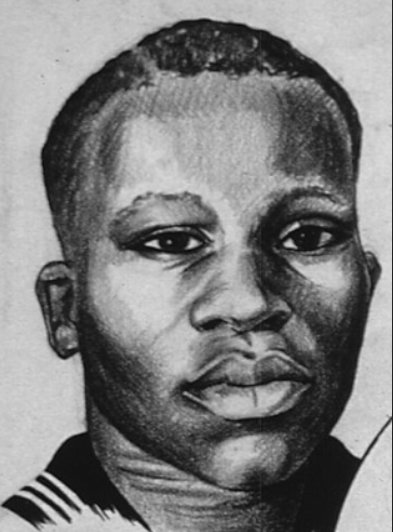
- Military career
- Allegiance: United States of America
- Branch: United States Navy
- Rank: Machinist's Apprentice Third Class
- Service number: 646-04-19
- Unit: USS Lexington (CV-2)
- Conflicts: World War II: Battle of the Coral Sea; Battle of Wake Island
- Awards: Navy and Marine Corps Medal

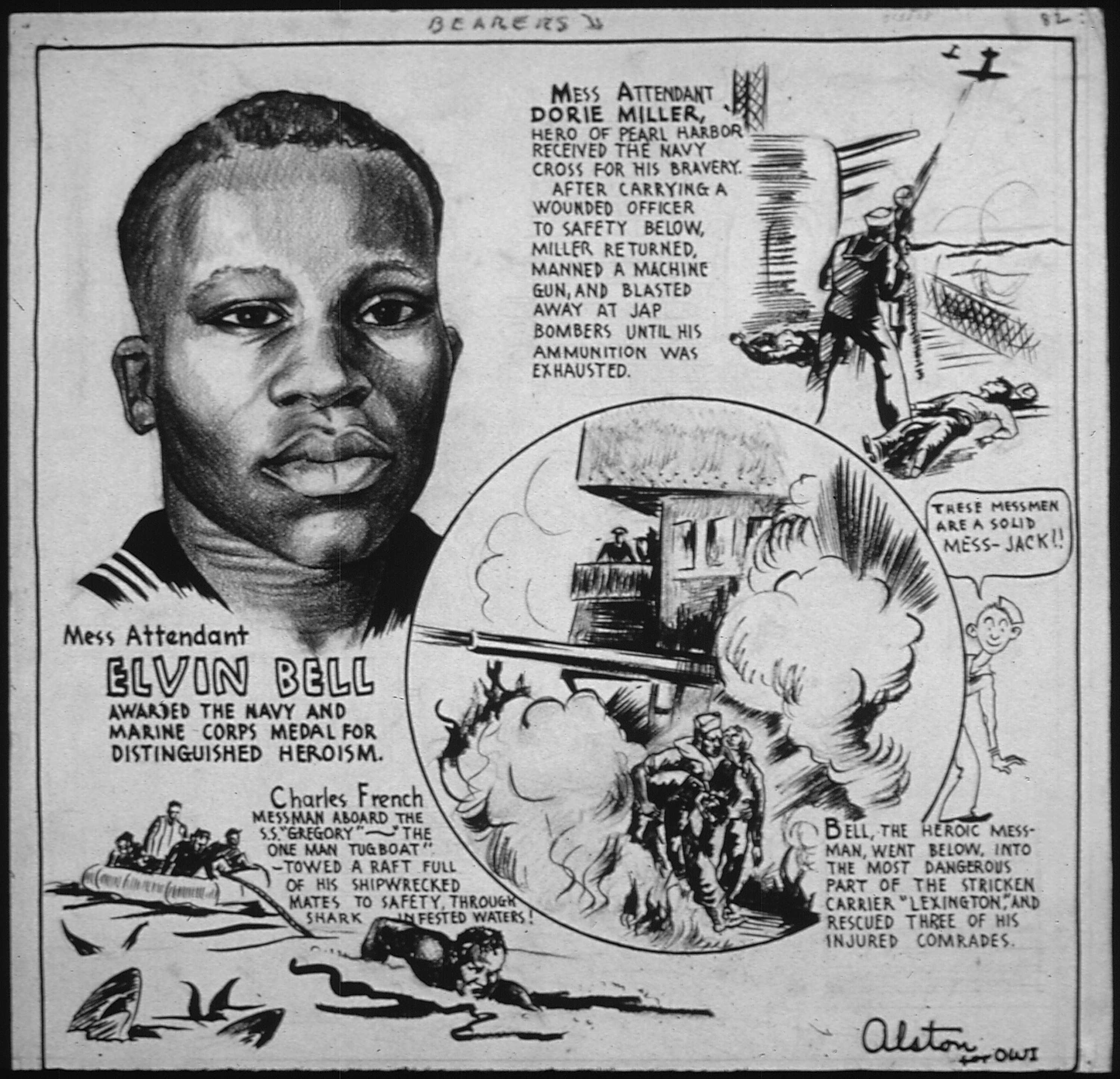
Cartoon of Bell's exploits, by Charles Alston

Elvin Bell was a decorated African-American hero who served with the US Navy during the Second World War. When the USS Lexington (CV-2) was damaged in battle on May 8, 1942, he distinguished himself by rescuing three men.

== USS Lexington ==
The USS Lexington (CV-2) was an American aircraft carrier during the Second World War. It was part of the Pacific fleet and had 2,122 men on board. The ship escaped the attack on Pearl Harbor because it was en route to Midway to deliver aircraft. The ship also participated in the aborted attack on Wake Island.

== May 8, 1942 ==
During the battle of the Coral Sea, on May 8, 1942, the USS Lexington was badly damaged. Two torpedoes and three bombs caused the ship to be damaged. Although it initially appeared that the damage was limited, gasoline vapors exploded and it was not possible to save the ship. Bell helped evacuate personnel trapped below decks. What happened to Bell after the Second World War is unknown.

== Citation ==
"The President of the United States of America takes pleasure in presenting the Navy and Marine Corps Medal to Machinist's Apprentice Third Class Elvin Bell (NSN: 6460419), United States Navy, for heroism involving voluntary risk of life not involving conflict with an armed enemy, while serving aboard the Aircraft Carrier U.S.S. LEXINGTON (CV-2), on 8 May 1942, during the Battle of the Coral Sea. Machinist's Apprentice Third Class Bell voluntarily joined a repair party fighting fire in an area frequented by violent explosions of gasoline vapor and ammunition and, although emerging in an exhausted condition, unhesitatingly entered the most dangerous section of the stricken carrier and assisted in removing injured personnel who had been trapped below decks. His courage and utter disregard for his own safety were in keeping with the highest traditions of the United States Naval Service."

== See also ==
- Doris Miller
