= National Register of Historic Places listings in the United States Minor Outlying Islands =

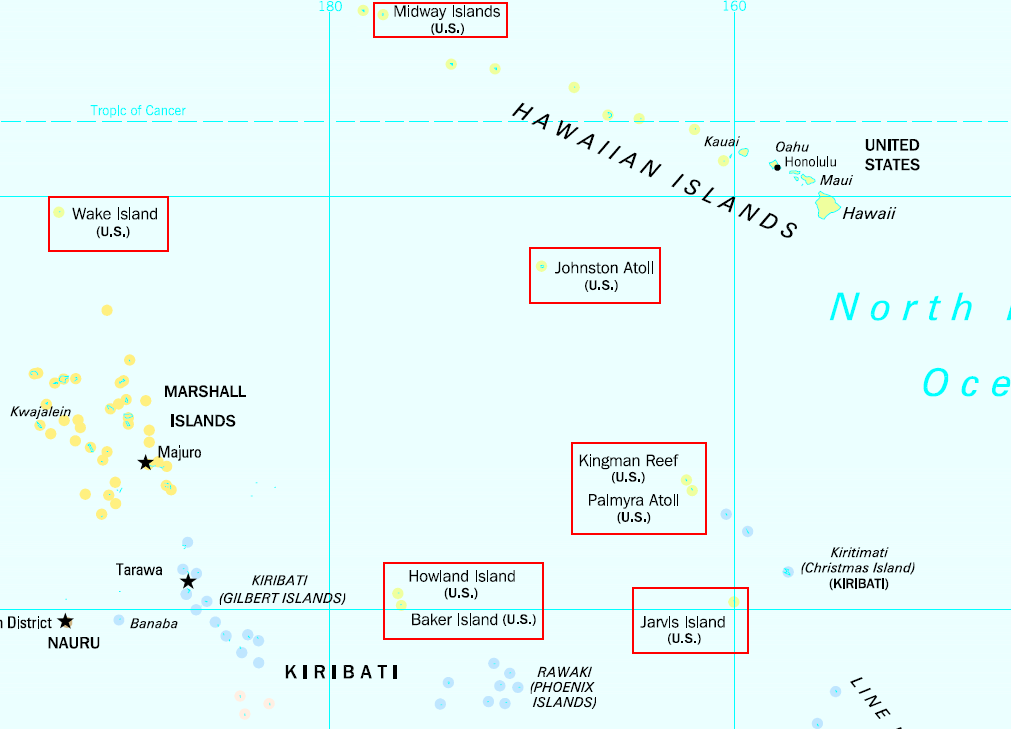
Map of the United States Minor Outlying Islands

This is a list of the buildings, sites, districts, and objects listed on the National Register of Historic Places across the United States Minor Outlying Islands. There are currently two listed sites located on two of the twelve islands or atolls that make up the Minor Outlying Islands.

This National Park Service list is complete through NPS recent listings posted October 2, 2026.

== Listings ==
	Name on the Register	Image	Date listed	Location	City or town	Description
1	Wake Island	Wake Island	September 16, 1985 (#85002726)	In the North Pacific; 19°18′00″N 166°38′00″E	Wake Island	
2	World War II Facilities at Midway	World War II Facilities at Midway	May 28, 1987 (#87001302)	Sand and Eastern Islands; 28°12′N 177°21′W	Midway Atoll	

== See also ==
- List of United States National Historic Landmarks in United States commonwealths and territories, associated states, and foreign states
