= Henderson Field (Midway Atoll) =

Public airport on Sand Island in Midway Atoll

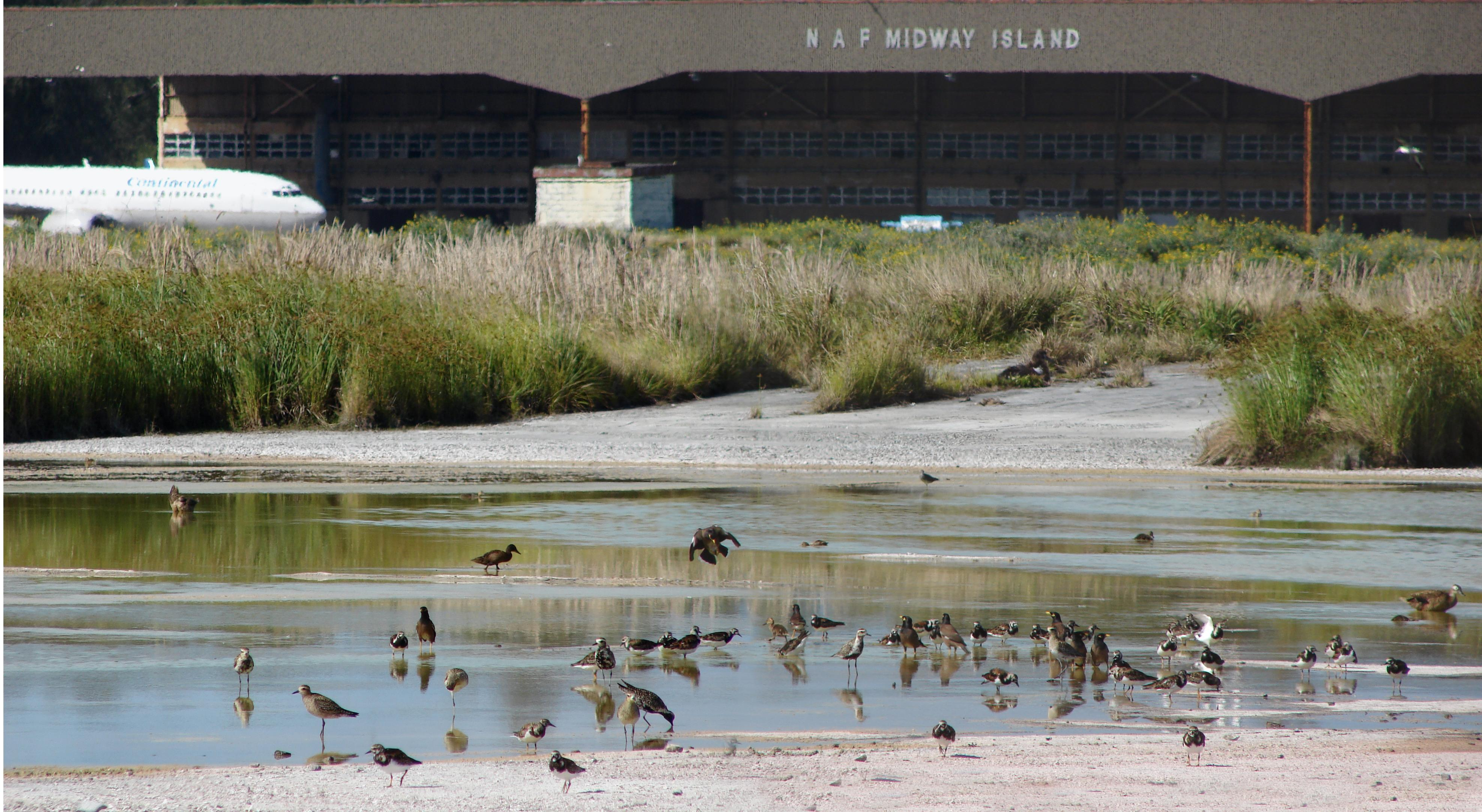
- Former Navy hanger and a Continental Airlines Boeing 737 at Henderson Field in June 2008
- IATA: MDY; ICAO: PMDY; FAA LID: MDY; WMO: 91066

Summary
- Airport type: Public
- Owner: U.S. Dept. of the Interior (Fish and Wildlife Service)
- Operator: American Airports (sub-contracted to Chugach Industries)
- Serves: Midway Atoll
- Location: Sand Island
- Elevation AMSL: 18 ft (5.5 m)
- Coordinates: 28°12′05″N 177°22′53″W

Maps
- Location on Sand Island. Former runways in gray.
- Interactive map of Henderson Field

Runways
Direction	Length		Surface
Direction	ft	m	Surface
6/24	7,800	2,377	Asphalt
- Source: Federal Aviation Administration

Henderson Field (IATA: MDY, ICAO: PMDY, FAA LID: MDY) is a public airport located on Sand Island in Midway Atoll, an unincorporated territory of the United States. It serves primarily as an emergency diversion airport for trans-Pacific flights and provides access to the Midway Atoll National Wildlife Refuge. It is one of three airfields named after Major Lofton R. Henderson, who was killed in the Battle of Midway during World War II, the others being the former Henderson Field on Midway's Eastern Island and Henderson Field on Guadalcanal in the Solomon Islands.

The airport occupies the site of the former Naval Air Facility Midway, which operated until 1993. Construction of the airfield began in July 1942 by Seabees of the 1st Naval Construction Battalion as a bomber airstrip. During the military period, the name Henderson Field referred to the airfield on Eastern Island. Following the closure of the naval air facility, the name was transferred to the Sand Island airport.

After the U.S. Navy transferred Midway Atoll to the Department of the Interior, airport operations were subsidized by Boeing until 2004. Since then, the airport has been owned by the U.S. Fish and Wildlife Service, with operations and maintenance provided by contractors with financial assistance from the Federal Aviation Administration.

Henderson Field is a non-towered airport. Because Midway Atoll National Wildlife Refuge supports one of the world's largest nesting colonies of albatrosses, scheduled flight arrivals and departures are generally restricted to nighttime between November and June to reduce disturbance to the birds.

== Past airline service ==
During the early 1950s, the airfield was used as a technical stop by Pan American World Airways (Pan Am) for its Boeing 377 Stratocruiser propliners as part of Pan Am's round the world service from New York City to San Francisco via London, Frankfurt, Delhi, Bangkok, Hong Kong, Guam, Honolulu and other en route stops.

The airfield was previously served by Aloha Airlines with scheduled weekly charter flights to and from Honolulu using a Boeing 737-200 jetliner. In early 2000, Aloha began scheduled 737 passenger service between Midway Island and Honolulu.

Continental Micronesia served Midway with Boeing 727-100 jetliners during the early 1970s although the airport was only used as an "operational stop" for refueling on this airline's westbound service from Honolulu to Guam. The routing of these 727 flights was Honolulu - Midway Island - Kwajalein - Majuro - Ponape - Truk - Guam.

== Facilities ==
Henderson Field covers 1,200 acres (486 ha) and has one runway.

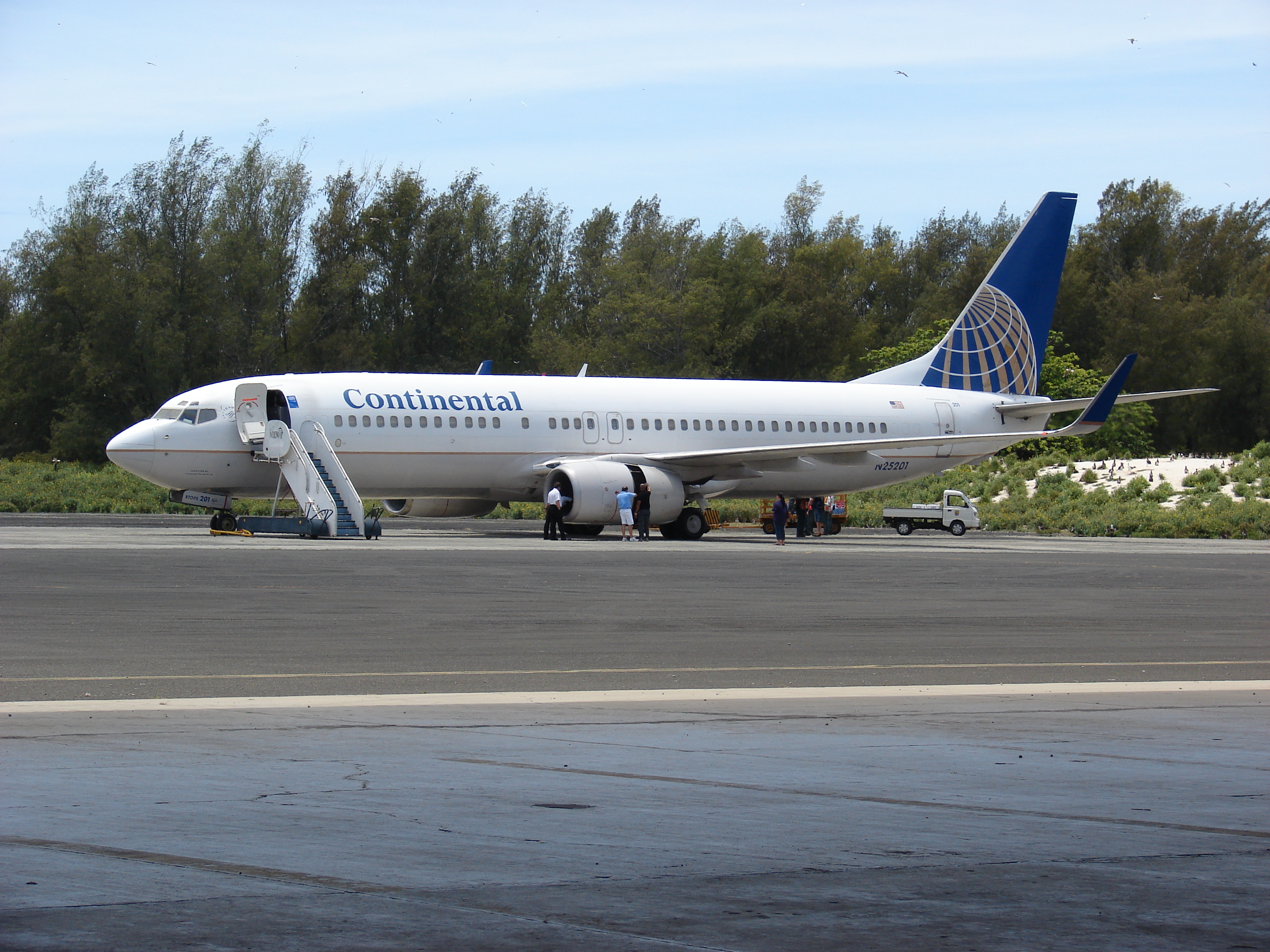
Continental Airlines Boeing 737 at Midway to commemorate the 66th anniversary of the Battle of Midway, in 2008

== Accidents and incidents ==
- On January 22, 1961, a Lockheed WV-2 Super Constellation (143193) of the US Navy was returning from an aborted barrier mission and hit seawall debris while landing, killing six of the 22 occupants along with the three occupants of a Crash Crew Truck that were hit by the main mount when it slid off and exploded.
- On January 7, 2004, Continental Airlines Flight 6, a Boeing 777-200 from Tokyo to Houston carrying 294 people made an emergency landing at 03:10 local time at Henderson Field due to losing an engine after suffering an oil leak from a starter. Continental flew in a Learjet with a maintenance crew of four, a new starter and additional food and water supplies for passengers to Midway.
- On June 17, 2011, Delta Air Lines Flight 277, a Boeing 747-400 traveling from Honolulu to Osaka with 359 passengers and 19 crew made an emergency landing on Henderson because of a crack in the windshield. During the landing at Midway, the plane hit two birds, one of which damaged a wing flap.
- On July 11, 2014, United Airlines Flight 201 from Honolulu to Guam made an emergency landing at Henderson Field after an "electrical odor" was detected in the cabin. An investigation revealed that an equipment supply cooling fan had malfunctioned.
- On April 16, 2021, United Airlines Flight 2781 made an emergency landing at Henderson Field after smoke/odor smell in the cockpit (reported in ACARS messages). The flight departed Guam, and was on its way to Los Angeles, operated with a Boeing 787-9. This flight carried only cargo.
- On September 24, 2021, Hawaiian Airlines Flight 460, an Airbus A330 en route from Seoul to Honolulu experienced an in-flight engine shut down and diverted to Midway.
