= List of museums in the United States =

A list of museums in the United States by state. According to a government statement, there are more than 35,000 museums in the US.

== Alabama ==
See List of museums in Alabama.
See also Category:Museums in Alabama.

== Alaska ==
See List of museums in Alaska.
See also Category:Museums in Alaska.

== Arizona ==
See List of museums in Arizona.
See also Category:Museums in Arizona.

== Arkansas ==
See List of museums in Arkansas.
See also Category:Museums in Arkansas.

== California ==
See List of museums in California.
See also Category:Museums in California.

== Colorado ==
See List of museums in Colorado.
See also Category:Museums in Colorado.

== Connecticut ==
See List of museums in Connecticut.
See also Category:Museums in Connecticut.

== Delaware ==
See List of museums in Delaware.
See also Category:Museums in Delaware.

== Florida ==
See List of museums in Florida.
See also Category:Museums in Florida.

== Georgia ==
See List of museums in Georgia.
See also Category:Museums in Georgia (U.S. state).

== Hawaii ==
See List of museums in Hawaii.
See also Category:Museums in Hawaii.

== Idaho ==
See List of museums in Idaho.
See also Category:Museums in Idaho.

== Illinois ==
See List of museums in Illinois.
See also Category:Museums in Illinois.
See also List of museums and cultural institutions in Chicago.

== Indiana ==
See List of museums in Indiana.
See also Category:Museums in Indiana.

== Iowa ==
See List of museums in Iowa.
See also Category:Museums in Iowa.

== Kansas ==
See List of museums in Kansas.
See also Category:Museums in Kansas.

== Kentucky ==
See List of museums in Kentucky.
See also Category:Museums in Kentucky.

== Louisiana ==
See List of museums in Louisiana.
See also Category:Museums in Louisiana.
See also List of museums in New Orleans, Louisiana.

== Maine ==
See List of museums in Maine.
See also Category:Museums in Maine.

== Maryland ==
See List of museums in Maryland.
See also Category:Museums in Maryland.

== Massachusetts ==
See List of museums in Massachusetts.
See also Category:Museums in Massachusetts.

== Michigan ==
See List of museums in Michigan.
See also Category:Museums in Michigan.

== Minnesota ==
See List of museums in Minnesota.
See also Category:Museums in Minnesota.

== Mississippi ==
See List of museums in Mississippi.
See also Category:Museums in Mississippi.

== Missouri ==
See List of museums in Missouri.
See also Category:Museums in Missouri.

== Montana ==
See List of museums in Montana.
See also Category:Museums in Montana.

== Nebraska ==
See List of museums in Nebraska.
See also Category:Museums in Nebraska.

== Nevada ==
See List of museums in Nevada.
See also Category:Museums in Nevada.

== New Hampshire ==
See List of museums in New Hampshire.
See also Category:Museums in New Hampshire.

== New Jersey ==
See List of museums in New Jersey.
See also Category:Museums in New Jersey.

== New Mexico ==
See List of museums in New Mexico.
See also Category:Museums in New Mexico.

== New York ==
See List of museums in New York.
See also Category:Museums in New York (state).
See also List of university art museums and galleries in New York State.
See also List of museums and cultural institutions in New York City.
See also List of museums in New York City.
See also List of museums on Long Island.

== North Carolina ==
See List of museums in North Carolina.
See also Category:Museums in North Carolina.

== North Dakota ==
See List of museums in North Dakota.
See also Category:Museums in North Dakota.

== Ohio ==
See List of museums in Ohio.
See also Category:Museums in Ohio.

== Oklahoma ==
See also List of museums in Oklahoma.
See also Category:Museums in Oklahoma.

== Oregon ==
See List of museums in Oregon.
See also Category:Museums in Oregon.

== Pennsylvania ==
See List of museums in Pennsylvania.
See also Category:Museums in Pennsylvania.

== Rhode Island ==
See List of museums in Rhode Island.
See also Category:Museums in Rhode Island.

== South Carolina ==
See List of museums in South Carolina.
See also Category:Museums in South Carolina.

== South Dakota ==
See List of museums in South Dakota.
See also Category:Museums in South Dakota.

== Tennessee ==
See List of museums in Tennessee.
See also Category:Museums in Tennessee.

== Texas ==
See List of museums in Texas.
See also Category:Museums in Texas.

== Utah ==
See List of museums in Utah.
See also Category:Museums in Utah.

== Vermont ==
See List of museums in Vermont.
See also Category:Museums in Vermont.

== Virginia ==
See List of museums in Virginia.
See also Category:Museums in Virginia.

== Washington ==
See List of museums in Washington (state).
See also Category:Museums in Washington (state).
See also Museums and galleries of Seattle.

== West Virginia ==
See List of museums in West Virginia.
See also Category:Museums in West Virginia.

== Wisconsin ==
See List of museums in Wisconsin.
See also Category:Museums in Wisconsin.

== Wyoming ==
See List of museums in Wyoming.
See also Category:Museums in Wyoming.

== Washington, D.C. ==
See List of museums in Washington, D.C.
See also Category:Museums in Washington, D.C.

== U.S. territories ==
See List of museums in the U.S. territories.

== See also ==
- List of most-visited museums in the United States
- List of most-visited art museums
- List of aquariums
- List of Route 66 museums
- List of notable museums and galleries
- List of planetariums
- List of zoos

=== Museums by type ===
- Accredited by American Alliance of Museums
- Aerospace museums
- African American museums
- American national museums
- Archaeological museums
- Art museums and galleries
- Biographical museums
- Children's museums
- Computer Museums
- Creationist museums
- Defunct museums
- Ethnic museums
- Farm museums
- Historic house museums
- History museums
- Industry museums
- Jail and prison museums
- Lighthouse museums
- Living museums
- Mass media museums
- Medical museums
- Military and war museums
- Mill museums
- Mining museums
- Music museums
- Native American museums
- Natural history museums
- Open-air museums
- Philatelic museums
- Presidential libraries
- Railway museums
- Religious museums
- Science museums
- Scouting museums
- Sculpture parks
- Ships as museums
- Smithsonian Institution affiliates
- Sports museums
- Technology museums
- Transport museums
- University museums
