= Naval Air Facility Midway Island =

US air station in the Midway Atoll

- NAS Midway
- Midway Atoll in United States
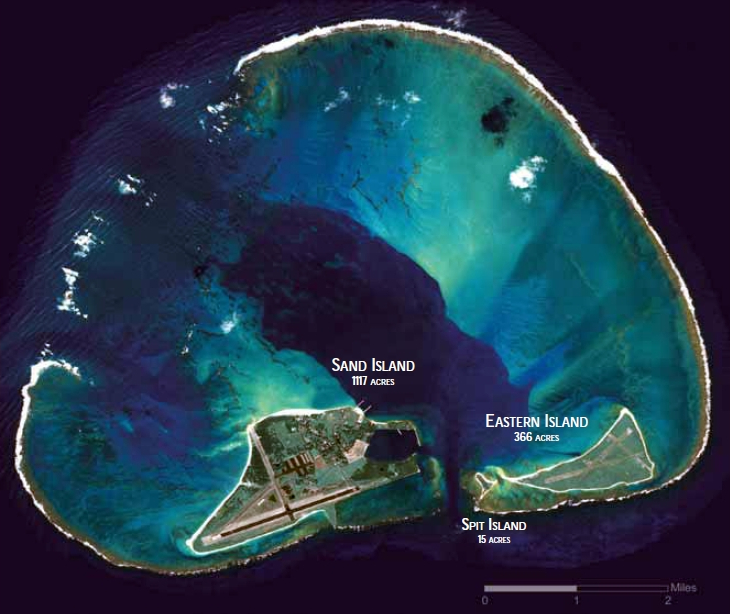
- Midway Atoll, showing NAS Midway runways and their remnants.

Site information
- Type: Air Facility
- Owner: US Navy

Location
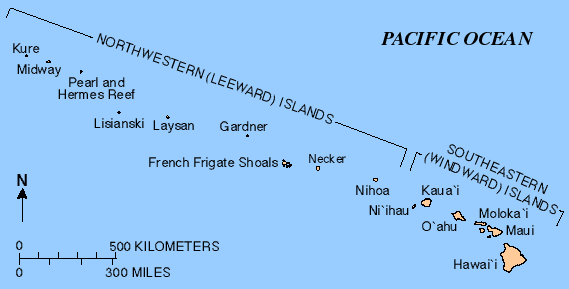
- Midway is at the far northwest end of the Hawaiian archipelago. (Click to expand)
- Coordinates: 28°12′05″N 177°22′53″W

Site history
- Built: 1941
- In use: October 1, 1993
- Fate: Closed
- Battles/wars: Battle of Midway

Naval Air Station Midway Island, also known as NAS Midway, Naval Air Facility Midway, and NAF Midway (former ICAO PMDY), was a U.S. Naval Air Station in the Midway Atoll, the northernmost group of the Hawaiian archipelago. It was in operation from 1941 to 1993, and played an important role in trans-Pacific aviation during those years. Through its lifetime, the facility was variously designated as a Naval Air Station, a Naval Air Facility, and a naval base. It was finally closed on October 1, 1993.

Midway Atoll consists of two small islets, Sand Island and Eastern Island, surrounded by a coral reef. Most of each islet is taken up by airfields. The islands were discovered in 1859, and placed under Navy control by President Theodore Roosevelt in 1903. They gained importance in the mid-1930s as a seaplane stop for the Pan American Airways Clipper planes. A Navy presence then began building up, and Naval Air Station Midway Islands was established on Eastern Island in August 1941.

On December 7 of that year, the base was bombarded by Japanese surface ships as part of the attack on Pearl Harbor. This was followed by a major buildup of U.S. Navy, Marine, and Army Air Corps squadrons, meant to detect and defeat units of the Japanese fleet. In mid-1942, the Japanese attempted to invade the islands and destroy the nearby U.S. carrier task forces. From June 4–7, the Battle of Midway resulted in damage to most of the base, but Navy carrier aircraft sank four Japanese aircraft carriers and one cruiser. This became the turning point of the war in the Pacific.

After the Battle of Midway, a second airfield was developed, this one on Sand Island. This work necessitated enlarging the size of the island through land fill techniques, that when concluded, more than doubled the size of the island. It became an important stopover for planes heading to the war zone. It was the origin of a long-range strike on Wake Island by PB2Y Coronados, and was also used for the submarine war patrols that devastated Japanese shipping.

Activity diminished after the war, and Eastern Island was abandoned in 1945. The base was placed in caretaker status and the Naval Air Station was disestablished on August 1, 1950. It was reestablished as a Naval Air Facility Midway in July 1958, serving as a deployment site for land-based Navy WV-2 Warning Star (later redesignated EC-121K) aircraft performing airborne early warning barrier combat air patrol (BARCAP) missions. During the mid-1960s, NAF Midway became an important stop for transport aircraft moving to and from Vietnam, and the base was redesignated as a Naval Air Station.

In 1968, a shore terminal, in which output of the array at sea was processed and displayed by means of the Low Frequency Analyzer and Recorder (LOFAR), for the Undersea Surveillance System (SOSUS) was installed and commissioned. NAVFAC Midway's mission remained secret until its decommissioning after data from its arrays had been remoted first to Naval Facility Barbers Point, Hawaii in 1981 and then directly to the Naval Ocean Processing Facility (NOPF) Ford Island, Hawaii.

In 1970, Eastern Island was once again vacated, this time being designated as a wildlife sanctuary. After the Vietnam War, NAS Midway mainly served as a refueling stop and a base for occasional Navy patrol planes. In October 1978, it was again downgraded to naval air facility status and all military dependents were sent home to Hawaii while military personnel cycled through on either unaccompanied remote or short duration assignments. At the end of the Cold War, operations dwindled even more. NAF Midway was disestablished pursuant to BRAC on October 1, 1993.

After its closure as a naval installation, the airfield reopened as a civilian airport under the name Henderson Field.

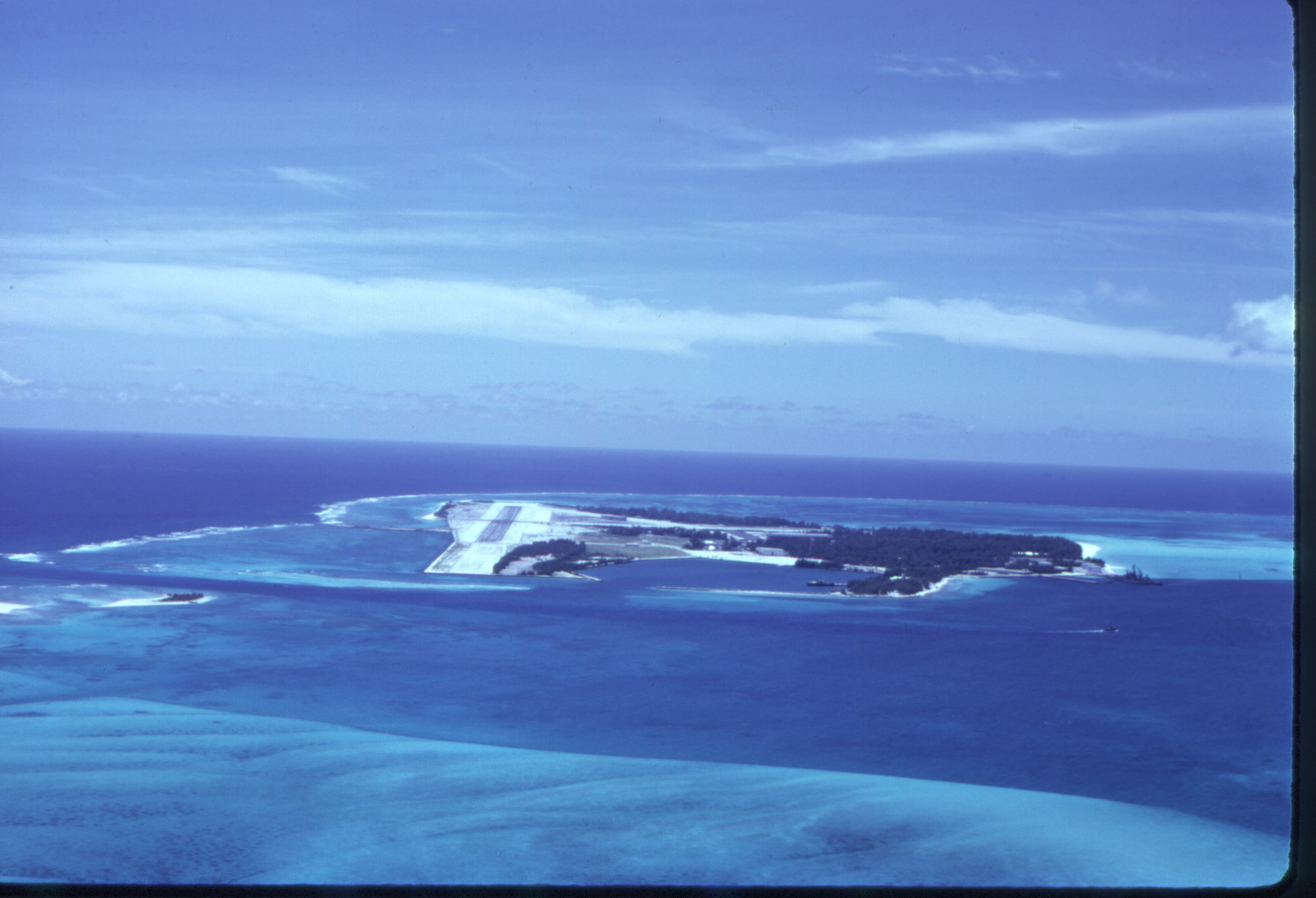
MDY Approach 1970

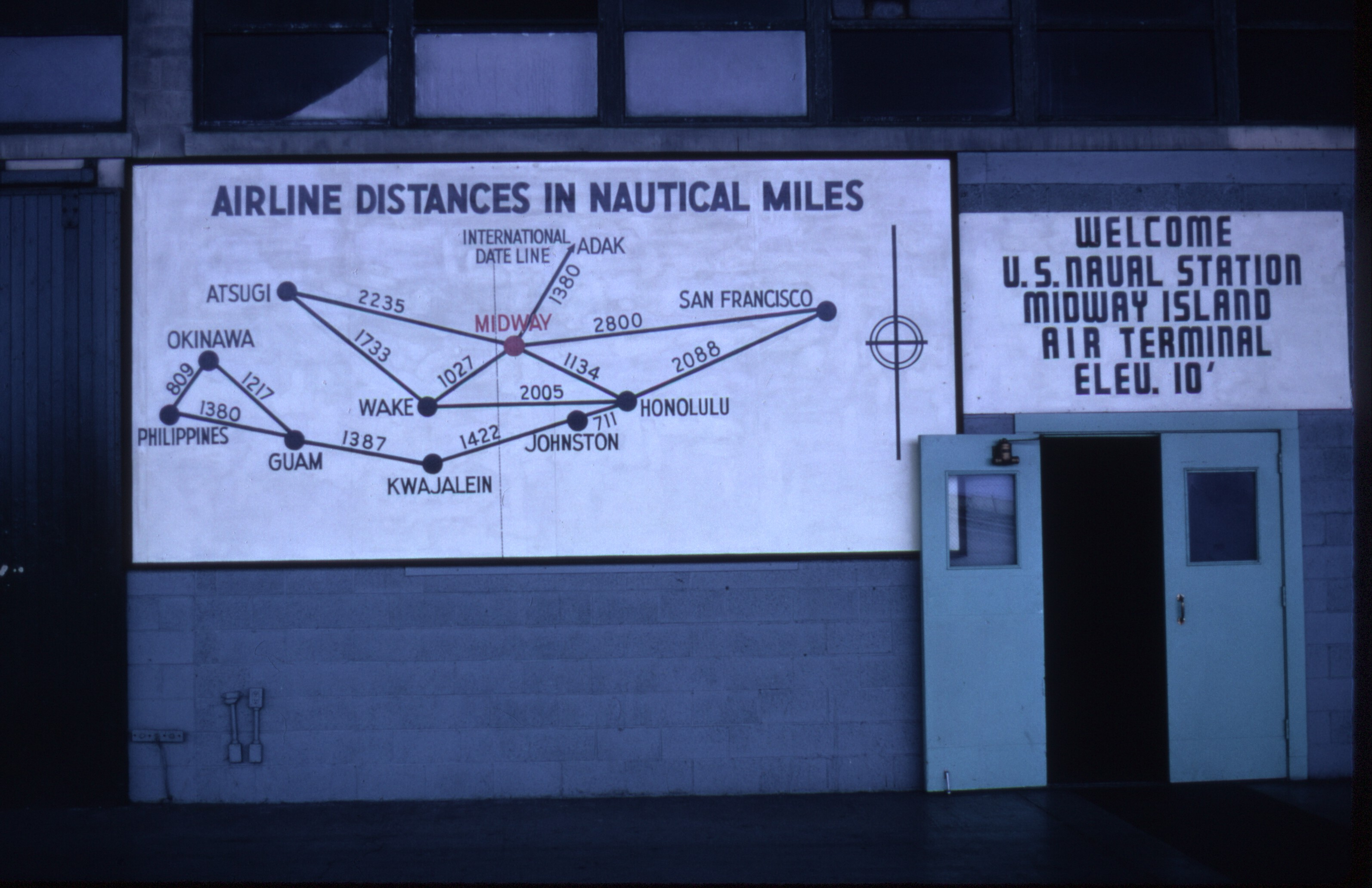
NAS Midway Terminal 1970

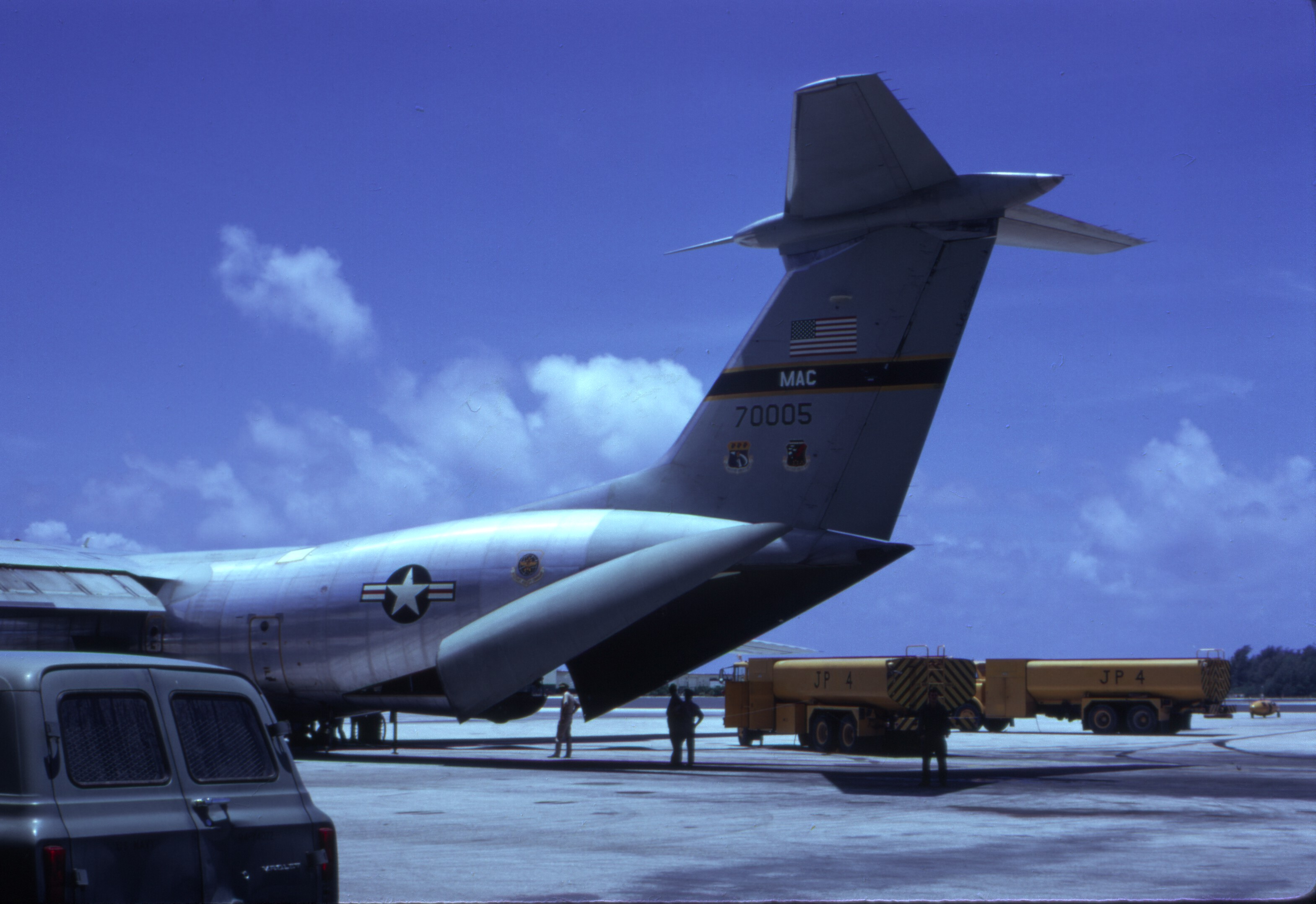
C-141 at NAS Midway 1970

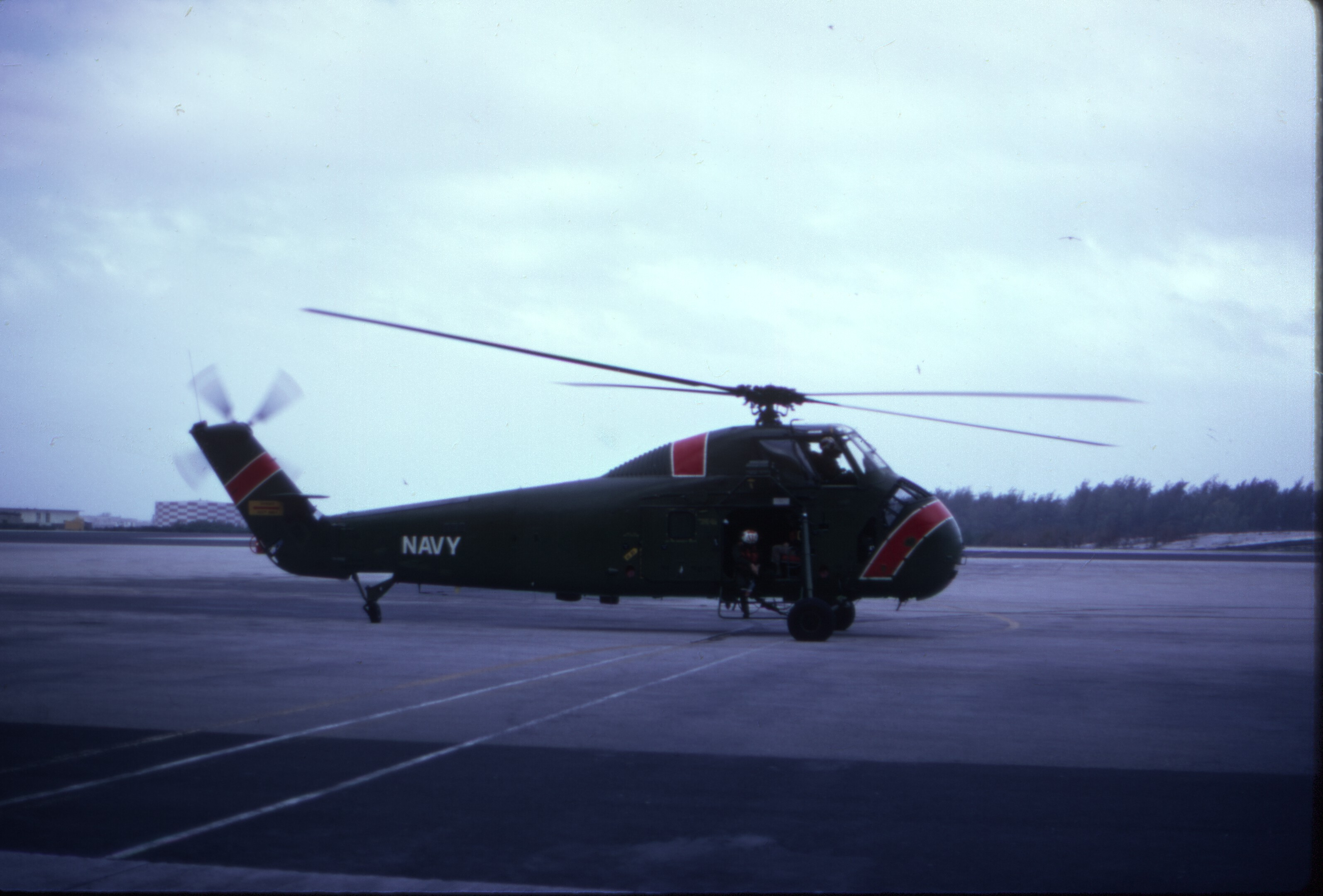
UH-34 at NAS Midway 1970

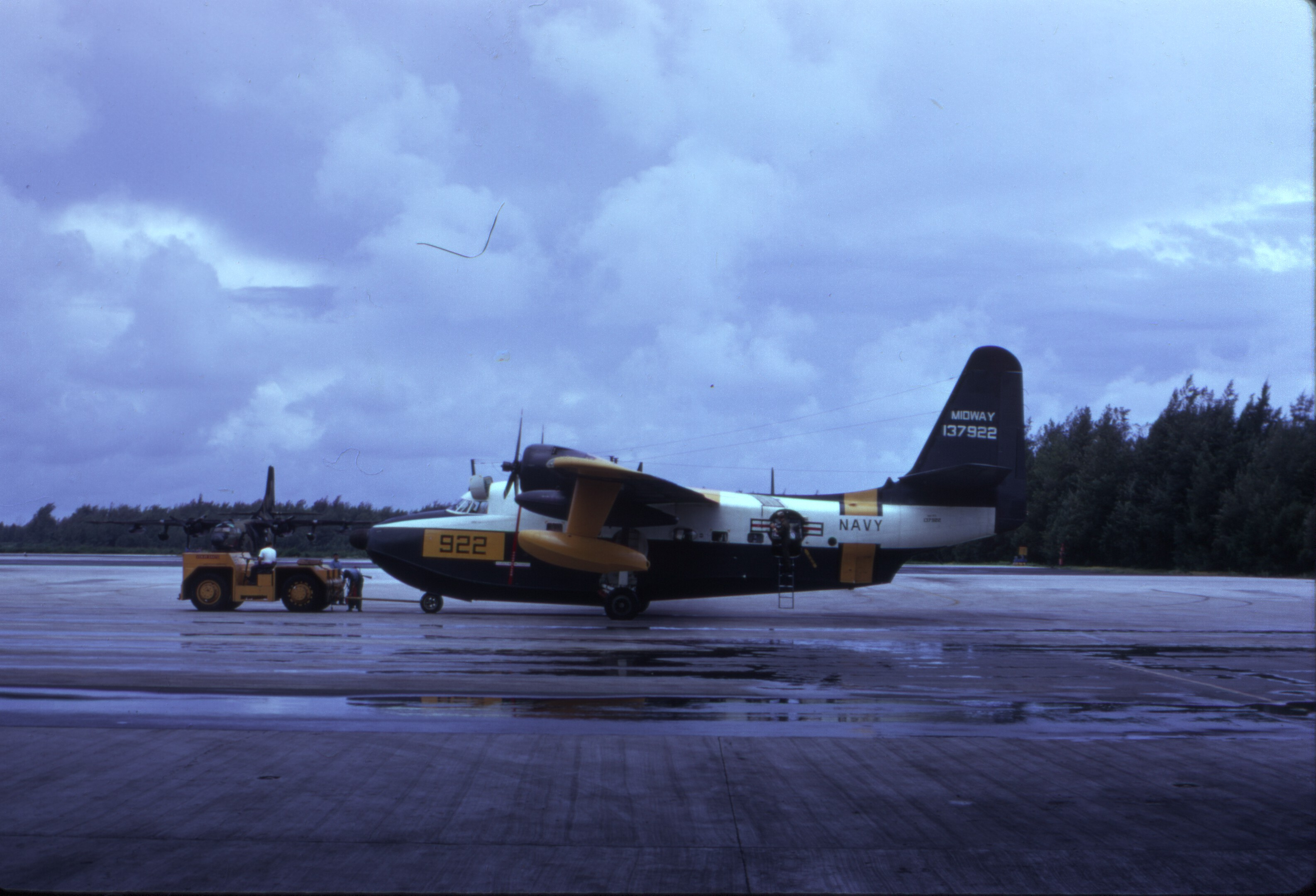
HU-16 at NAS Midway 1970
