= World War II Facilities at Midway =

- U.S. National Register of Historic Places
- U.S. National Historic Landmark District
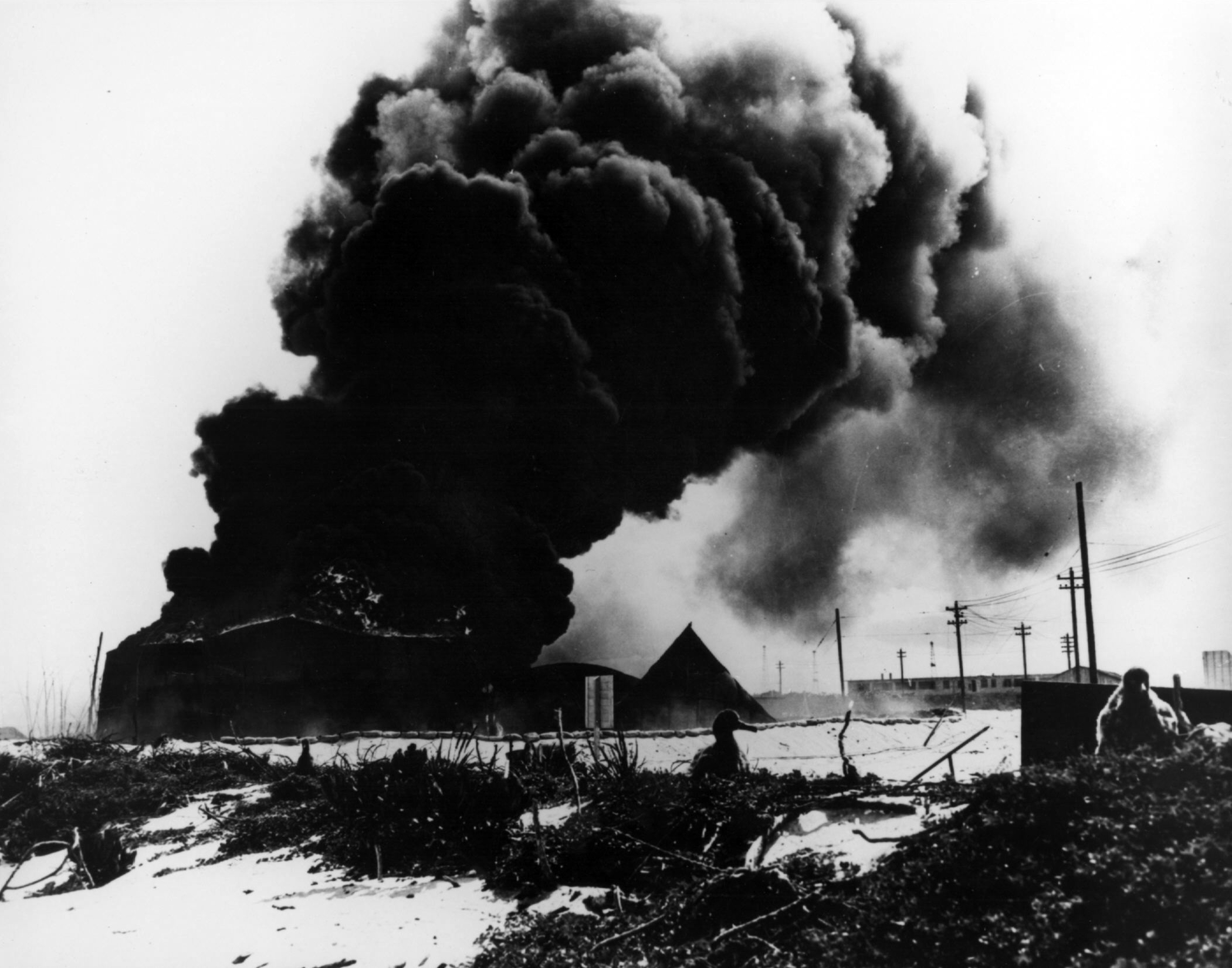
- Burning oil tanks during the Battle of Midway

- Location within Pacific Ocean
- Location: Sand Island, Midway Islands, United States Minor Outlying Islands
- Coordinates: 28°12′0″N 177°21′0″W
- Built: 1941
- Architect: United States Navy
- NRHP reference No.: 87001302

Significant dates
- Added to NRHP: May 28, 1987
- Designated NHLD: May 28, 1987

The World War II Facilities at Midway were built as part of the fortification leading up to World War II. The Midway Atoll's unique location halfway between the United States and Japan ensured it would hold a strategic position. This island was the site of the pivotal Battle of Midway which shifted the balance of sea power in the Pacific towards the United States.

The atoll's two main islands, Eastern Island and Sand Island, were both fortified by the Navy. Eastern Island, the smaller of the two islands, had three runways in a triangular configuration, and was defended by six coastal and dual-purpose batteries, armed with 3-, 5-, and 7-inch guns. Sand Island, one mile wide and two long, was completely developed by the Navy, but had no runways until after the war. At the time of the battle, Sand Island was defended by six batteries erected by the 6th Defense Battalion, and one by the 3d Defense Battalion. In clockwise order from the northwest corner of the island, these were: Battery C, two 5-inch guns; "naval" battery, two 3-inch guns; Battery F, four 3-inch guns; Battery A, two 5-inch guns; Battery D, four 3-inch guns; unnamed battery, two 7-inch guns; Battery A, two 5-inch guns; 3d Battalion Battery D, four 3-inch guns.

The military shut down all of its bases by 1993, handing over control to the United States Fish and Wildlife Service. The islands remain mostly uninhabited and unvisited. They are part of Papahānaumokuākea Marine National Monument.

Many of the facilities built by the Navy during the war deteriorated as the population of the Eastern and Sand Islands declined. Some facilities, such as the Eastern Island runways, were abandoned. New runways were built on Sand Island, in some cases destroying some of the surviving war defenses in the process. A number of the surviving elements of the atoll's defenses were designated a National Historic Landmark District in 1987. The following elements, all on Sand Island, comprise that designation:

- three ammunition magazines associated with Battery A: S-7113, S-7119, S-7121
- one and a half emplacements for 3-inch guns of 3d Battalion Battery D
- two ammunition magazines associated with 3d Battalion Battery D: S-7124, S-7125
- a concrete pillbox near S-7125
- two emplacements for the 3-inch naval battery
- one ammunition magazine near the naval battery: S-6194

== See also ==
- National Register of Historic Places listings in the United States Minor Outlying Islands
