= Midway Atoll =

US atoll in the North Pacific Ocean

Native name: Kuaihelani (Hawaiian) Pihemanu (Hawaiian) Nickname: Midway Islands
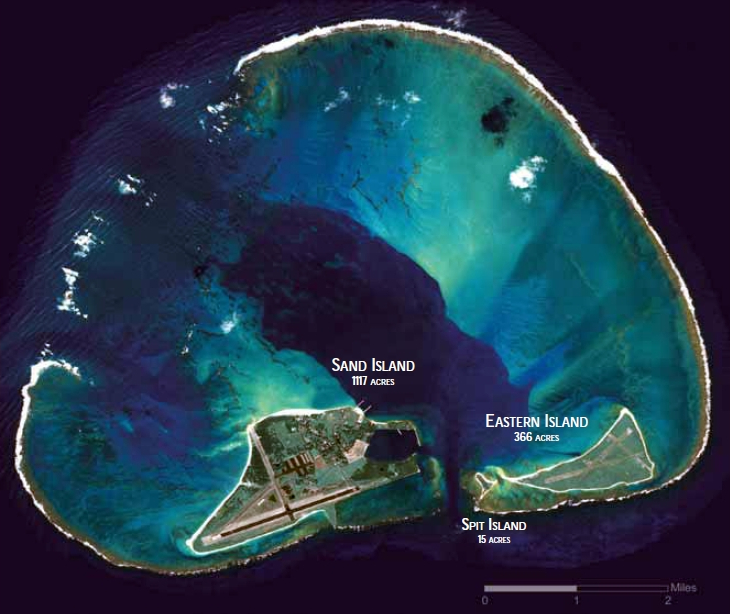
- Satellite image of Midway Atoll

- Midway Atoll northwest of Hawaii Midway Atoll (North Pacific )

Geography
- Location: North Pacific Ocean
- Coordinates: 28°12′27″N 177°21′00″W
- Archipelago: Hawaiian Archipelago
- Total islands: 3
- Major islands: Sand, Eastern, Spit
- Area: 5.98 sq mi (15.5 km^{2})
- Length: 5 mi (8 km)
- Width: 5 mi (8 km)
- Highest elevation: 43 ft (13.1 m)

Administration
- United States
- Department: Department of the Interior
- Insular area: Midway Atoll
- Operating unit: United States Fish and Wildlife Service
- Largest Settlement: Sand Island (pop. 40)

Demographics
- Demonym: Midway Islander
- Population: 40 (2019 (est.))
- Pop. density: 16.5/sq mi (6.37/km^{2})

Additional information
- Time zone: Samoa Time (UTC−11)
- ISO code: UM-71

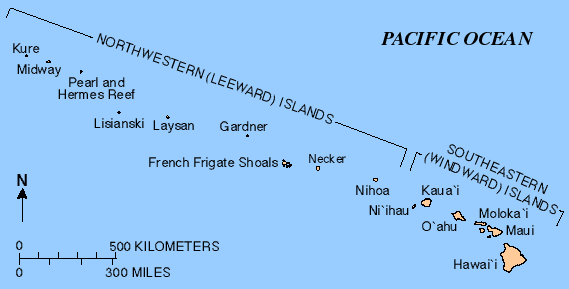
Map showing the location of Midway Atoll in the Hawaiian island chain

Midway Atoll (colloquial: Midway Islands; Hawaiian: Kuaihelani, lit. 'the backbone of heaven'; Pihemanu, 'the loud din of birds') is a 2.4 sq mi (6.2 km^{2}) atoll in the North Pacific Ocean. Midway Atoll is an insular area of the United States, and is an unorganized and unincorporated territory of the U.S.

Midway Atoll consists of three islands. The largest island is Sand Island, which is inhabited and has an airstrip. Immediately east of Sand Island, across the narrow Brooks Channel, is Eastern Island, which is uninhabited and no longer has any facilities. Forming a rough, incomplete circle around the two main islands and creating Midway Lagoon is a third island, Spit Island, a narrow reef.

Roughly equidistant between North America and Asia, the islands of the Midway Atoll are the only three islands in the Hawaiian Islands not part of the state of Hawaii. Unlike the other Hawaiian islands, Midway observes Samoa Time (UTC−11:00, i.e., eleven hours behind Coordinated Universal Time), which is one hour behind the time in the Hawaii–Aleutian Time Zone used in Hawaii. For statistical purposes, Midway is grouped as one of the United States Minor Outlying Islands. The Midway Atoll National Wildlife Refuge, encompassing 590,991.50 acres (239,165.77 ha) of land and water in the surrounding area, is administered by the United States Fish and Wildlife Service (FWS). The refuge and surrounding area are part of the larger Papahānaumokuākea Marine National Monument.

From 1941 until 1993, the atoll was the home of Naval Air Facility Midway Island, which played a crucial role in the Battle of Midway, June 4–6, 1942. Aircraft based at the then-named Henderson Field on Eastern Island joined with United States Navy ships and planes in an attack on a Japanese battle group that sank four carriers and one heavy cruiser and defended the atoll from invasion. The battle was a critical Allied victory and a significant turning point of the Pacific campaign of World War II.

About 50 people live on Sand Island: U.S. Fish and Wildlife Service staff and contract workers. Visiting the atoll is possible only for business reasons, which includes permanent and temporary staff, contractors, and volunteers, as the tourism program has been suspended due to budget cutbacks. In 2012, the last year that the visitor program was in operation, 332 people made the trip to Midway. Tours focused on the unique ecology of Midway and its military history. The economy is derived solely from governmental sources. Nearly all supplies must be brought to the island by ship or plane, although a hydroponic greenhouse and garden supply some fresh fruits and vegetables.

== Location ==
As its name suggests, Midway is roughly equidistant between North America and Asia and lies almost halfway around the world longitudinally from Greenwich, England. It is near the northwestern end of the Hawaiian archipelago, 1,310 miles (2,110 km) northwest of Honolulu, Hawaii, and about one-third of the way from Honolulu to Tokyo, Japan. Unlike the rest of the Northwestern Hawaiian Islands, Midway is not part of the State of Hawaii due to the Hawaiian Organic Act of 1900 that formally annexed Hawaii to the United States as a territory, which defined Hawaii as "the islands acquired by the United States of America under an Act of Congress entitled 'Joint resolution to provide for annexing the Hawaiian Islands to the United States,'" referring to the Newlands Resolution of 1898. While it could be argued that Midway became part of Hawaii when Captain N.C. Brooks of the sealing ship Gambia sighted it in 1859, it was assumed at the time that Midway was independently acquired by the United States when Captain William Reynolds of USS Lackawanna visited in 1867, and thus not part of the Hawaii Territory.

In defining which islands the state of Hawaii would inherit from the Territory, the Hawaii Admission Act of 1959 clarified the question, specifically excluding Midway (along with Palmyra Island, Johnston Island, and Kingman Reef) from the jurisdiction of the state.

Midway Atoll is approximately 140 nmi (260 km; 160 mi) east of the International Date Line, about 2,800 nmi (5,200 km; 3,200 mi) west of San Francisco, and 2,200 nmi (4,100 km; 2,500 mi) east of Tokyo.

== Geography and geology ==
Geography of Midway Atoll
Island	Acres	Hectares
Sand Island	1,117	452
Eastern Island	336	136
Spit Island	15	6
Total land	1,549	627
Submerged reef/ocean	580,392	234,876

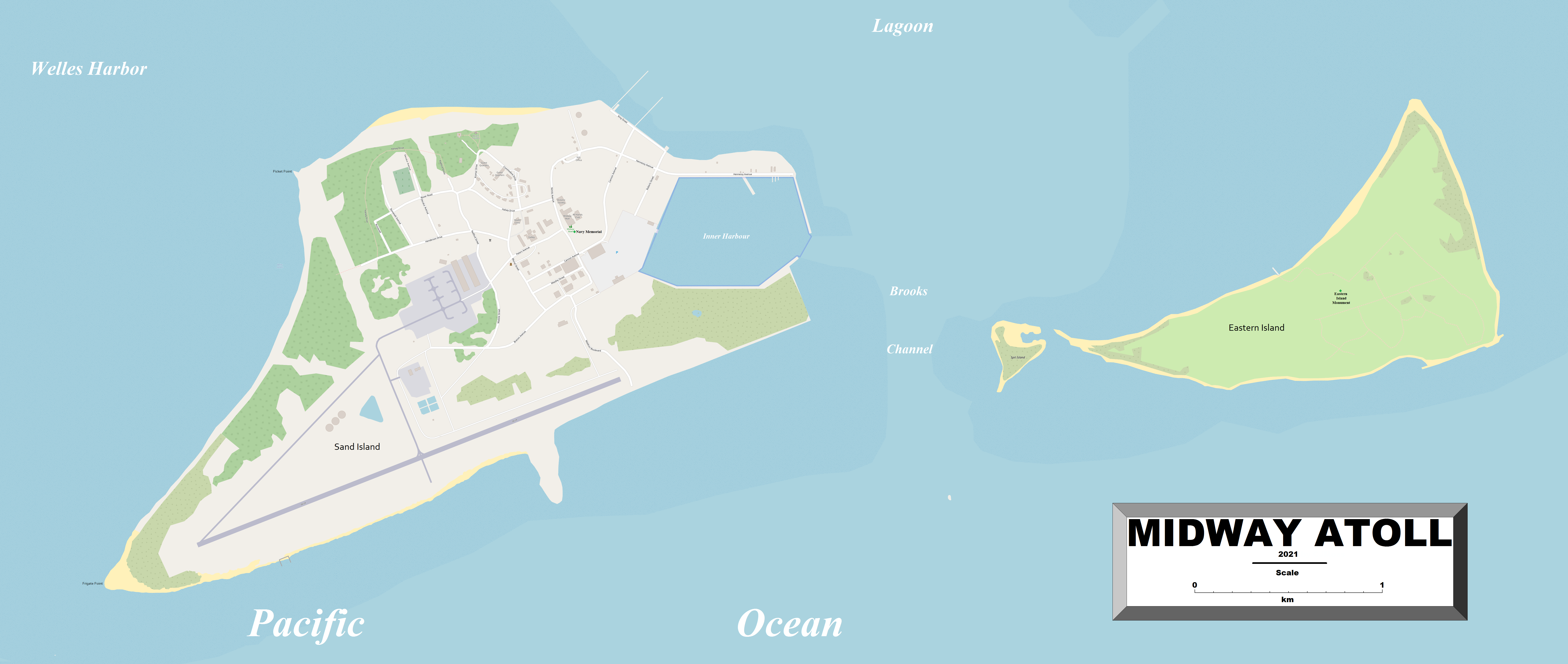
Enlargeable, detailed map of Midway Atoll

Midway Atoll is part of a chain of volcanic islands, atolls, and seamounts extending from near the Island of Hawaii up to the area of the Aleutian Islands and known as the Hawaiian–Emperor seamount chain, between Pearl and Hermes Atoll and Kure Atoll in the Northwestern Hawaiian Islands. It consists of a ring-shaped barrier reef nearly 5 mi (8.0 km) in diameter and several sand islets. The two significant pieces of land, Sand Island and Eastern Island, provide a habitat for millions of seabirds. The island sizes are shown in the table above.

Midway was formed roughly 28 million years ago when the seabed underneath it was over the same hotspot from which the Island of Hawaii is now being formed. Midway was once a shield volcano, perhaps as large as the island of Lanai. As the volcano piled up, lava flows built the island, its weight depressed the crust, and the island slowly subsided for millions of years, a process known as isostatic adjustment.

As the island subsided, a coral reef around the former volcanic island could maintain itself near sea level by growing upwards. That reef is now over 516 ft (157 m) thick (in the lagoon, 1,261 ft (384 m), composed mostly of post-Miocene limestones with a layer of upper Miocene (Tertiary g) sediments and lower Miocene (Tertiary e) limestones at the bottom overlying the basalts). What remains today is a shallow water atoll about 6 mi (9.7 km) across. Following Kure Atoll, Midway is the 2nd most northerly atoll in the world.

=== Infrastructure ===
The atoll has some 20 mi (32 km) of roads, 4.8 mi (7.7 km) of pipelines, one port on Sand Island (World Port Index Nr. 56328, MIDWAY ISLAND), and an airfield. As of 2004, Henderson Field airfield at Midway Atoll, with its one active runway (rwy 06/24, around 8,000 ft (2,400 m) long) has been designated as an emergency diversion airport for aircraft flying under ETOPS rules. Although the FWS closed all airport operations on November 22, 2004, public access to the island was restored in March 2008.

Eastern Island Airstrip is a disused airfield used by U.S. forces during the Battle of Midway. It is mostly constructed of Marston Mat and was built by the United States Navy Seabees.

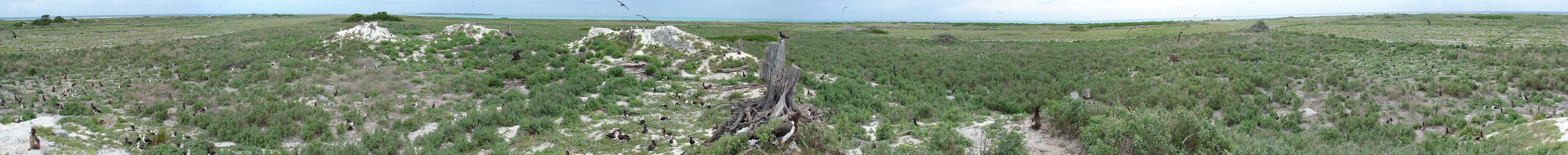
360-degree panoramic view of the low-lying landscape of Eastern Island, Midway Atoll

== Climate ==
Despite being located at 28°12′ N, which is north of the Tropic of Cancer, Midway Atoll has a tropical savanna climate (Köppen As) bordering a subtropical climate (Cfa) and a tropical rainforest climate (Af), with very pleasant year-round temperatures. Rainfall is fairly evenly distributed throughout the year, with only one month (June) having an average annual precipitation of less than 60 mm (2.4 in).

Climate data for Midway Atoll
Month	Jan	Feb	Mar	Apr	May	Jun	Jul	Aug	Sep	Oct	Nov	Dec	Year
Record high °F (°C)	80 (27)	78 (26)	79 (26)	82 (28)	86 (30)	89 (32)	92 (33)	92 (33)	92 (33)	89 (32)	88 (31)	82 (28)	92 (33)
Mean daily maximum °F (°C)	70.0 (21.1)	69.4 (20.8)	70.2 (21.2)	71.7 (22.1)	75.3 (24.1)	80.7 (27.1)	82.5 (28.1)	83.5 (28.6)	83.5 (28.6)	80.0 (26.7)	75.8 (24.3)	72.1 (22.3)	76.2 (24.6)
Mean daily minimum °F (°C)	62.2 (16.8)	61.7 (16.5)	62.6 (17.0)	64.1 (17.8)	67.4 (19.7)	72.8 (22.7)	74.6 (23.7)	75.6 (24.2)	75.1 (23.9)	72.4 (22.4)	68.4 (20.2)	64.4 (18.0)	68.4 (20.2)
Record low °F (°C)	51 (11)	51 (11)	51 (11)	53 (12)	55 (13)	62 (17)	63 (17)	64 (18)	64 (18)	60 (16)	55 (13)	51 (11)	51 (11)
Average precipitation inches (mm)	4.85 (123)	3.82 (97)	3.05 (77)	2.98 (76)	2.42 (61)	2.06 (52)	3.44 (87)	4.32 (110)	3.84 (98)	3.79 (96)	3.83 (97)	4.09 (104)	42.52 (1,080)
Average precipitation days	16	14	12	11	9	9	15	15	15	14	14	16	160
Source: Western Regional Climate Center

== History ==
Historical population
Census	Pop.	Note	%±
1900	21		—
1910	35		66.7%
1920	31		−11.4%
1930	36		16.1%
1940	437		1,113.9%
1950	416		−4.8%
1960	2,356		466.3%
1970	2,220		−5.8%
1980	453		−79.6%
1990	13		−97.1%
2000	4		−69.2%
2010	0		−100.0%
2014 (est.)	40

Midway has no indigenous inhabitants and was uninhabited until the 19th century.

=== 19th century ===
The atoll was sighted on July 5, 1859, by Captain N.C. Brooks, of the sealing ship Gambia. The islands were named the "Middlebrook Islands". Brooks claimed Midway for the United States under the Guano Islands Act of 1856, which authorized Americans to occupy uninhabited islands temporarily to obtain guano. There is no record of any attempt to mine guano on the island. On August 28, 1867, Captain William Reynolds of USS Lackawanna formally took possession of the atoll for the United States; the name changed to "Midway" some time after this. The atoll was the first Pacific island annexed by the United States as the Unincorporated Territory of Midway Island and was administered by the United States Navy.

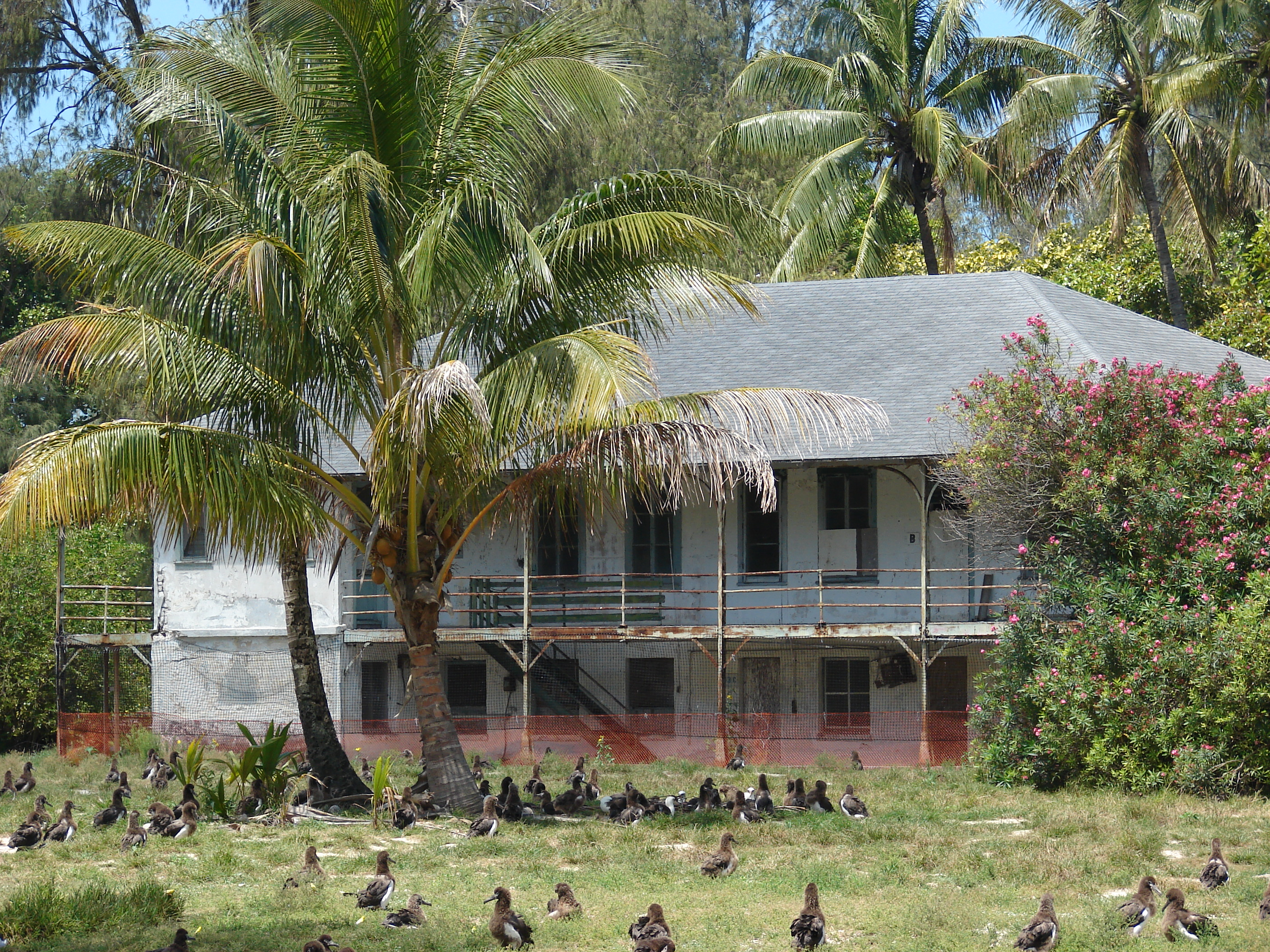
The buildings of the Commercial Pacific Cable Company date back to 1903 (photo from 2008).

The first attempt at settlement was in 1870 when the Pacific Mail Steamship Company started a project of blasting and dredging a ship channel through the reef to the lagoon using money put up by the United States Congress. The purpose was to establish a mid-ocean coaling station to avoid the high taxes imposed at ports controlled by the Kingdom of Hawaiʻi. The project was a failure, and the USS Saginaw evacuated the channel project's workforce in October 1870. The ship ran aground on October 21 at Kure Atoll, stranding 93 men. On November 18, five men set out in a small boat to seek help. On December 19, four of the men perished when the boat was upset in the breakers off of Kauaʻi. The survivor reached the U.S. Consulate in Honolulu on Christmas Eve. Relief ships were dispatched and reached Kure Atoll on January 4, 1871. The survivors of the Saginaw wreck reached Honolulu on January 14, 1871.

=== Early 20th century ===
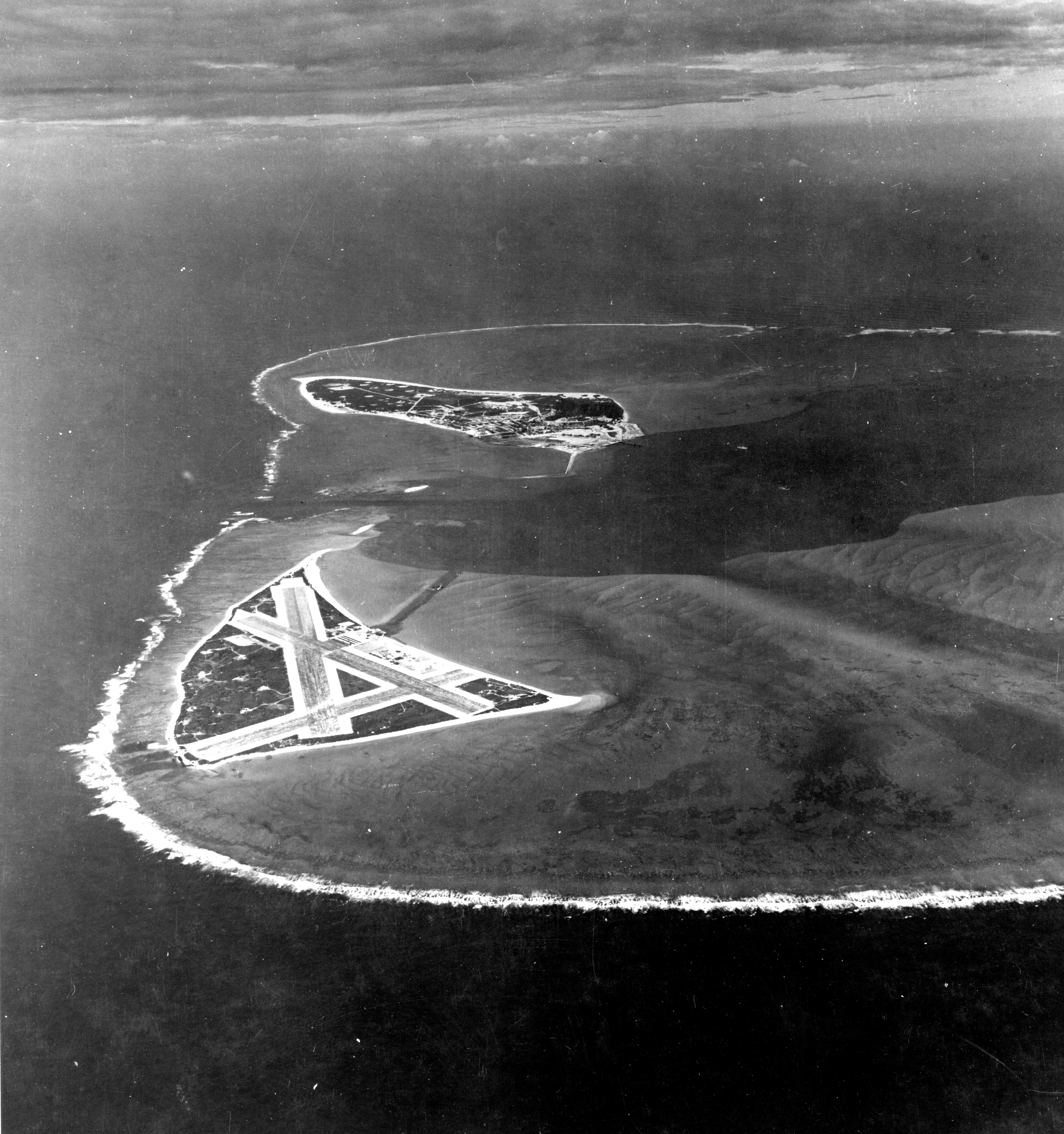
Midway Atoll in November 1941, looking west

In 1903, workers for the Commercial Pacific Cable Company took up residence on the island as part of the effort to lay a trans-Pacific telegraph cable. To make the island more verdant, these workers introduced many non-native species to the island, including the canary, cycad, Norfolk Island pine, she-oak/Ironwood, coconut, and various deciduous trees; along with some 9,000 short tons (8,200 t) of soil from Oahu and Guam. Ants, cockroaches, termites, centipedes, and countless other organisms were unintentionally introduced to Midway and the soil.

On January 20, 1903, the United States Navy opened a radio station in response to complaints from cable company workers about Japanese squatters and poachers. Between 1904 and 1908, President Theodore Roosevelt stationed 21 Marines on the island to end wanton destruction of bird life and keep Midway safe as a U.S. possession, protecting the cable station.

In 1935, operations began for the Martin M-130 flying boats operated by Pan American Airlines. The M-130s island-hopped from San Francisco to the Republic of China, providing the fastest and most luxurious route to the Far East and bringing tourists to Midway until 1941. Only the wealthy could afford the trip, which in the 1930s cost more than three times the annual salary of an average American. With Midway on the route between Honolulu and Wake Island, the flying boats landed in the atoll and pulled up to a float offshore in the lagoon. Tourists transferred to the Pan Am Hotel or the "Gooneyville Lodge", named after the ubiquitous "Gooney birds" (albatrosses), in this case Laysan Albatross and Black-footed Albatross.

=== World War II ===
- World War II Facilities at Midway
- U.S. National Register of Historic Places
- U.S. National Historic Landmark District
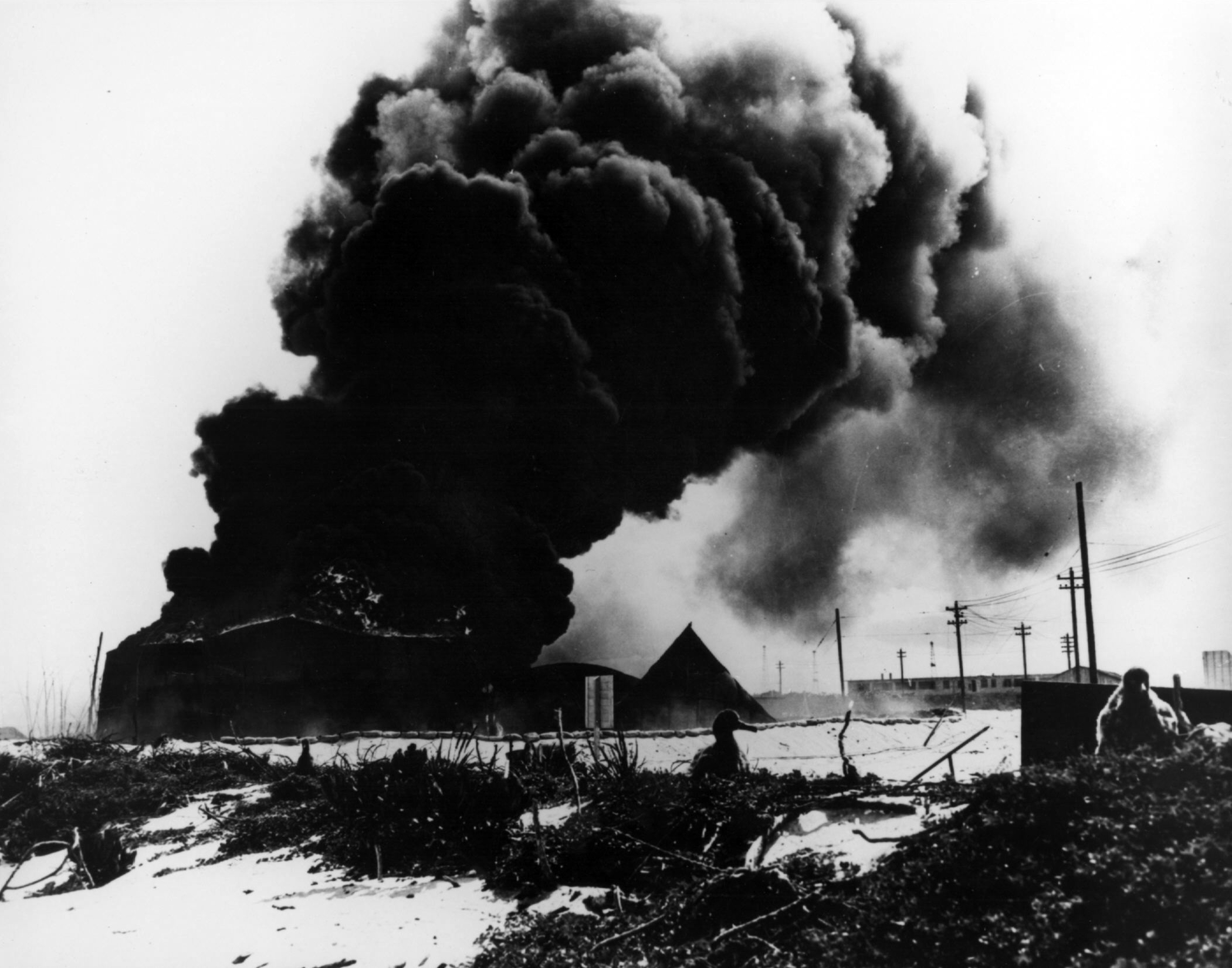
- Burning oil tanks during the Battle of Midway
- Location: Sand Island, Midway Islands, United States Minor Outlying Islands
- Built: 1941
- Architect: United States Navy
- NRHP reference No.: 87001302

Significant dates
- Added to NRHP: May 28, 1987
- Designated NHLD: May 28, 1987

The military importance of the location of Midway in the Pacific included its use as a convenient refueling stop on transpacific flights and for Navy ships. Beginning in 1940, as tensions with the Japanese rose, Midway was deemed second only to Pearl Harbor in importance to the protection of the U.S. West Coast. Airstrips, gun emplacements, and a seaplane base quickly materialized on the tiny atoll. The channel was widened, and Naval Air Station Midway was completed. Midway was also an important submarine base.

On February 14, 1941, President Franklin D. Roosevelt issued Executive order 8682 to create naval defense areas in the central Pacific territories. The proclamation established the "Midway Island Naval Defensive Sea Area", which encompassed the territorial waters between the extreme high-water marks and the three mi (4.8 km) marine boundaries surrounding Midway. "Midway Island Naval Airspace Reservation" was also established to restrict access to the airspace over the naval defense sea area. Only U.S. government ships and aircraft were permitted to enter the naval defense areas at Midway Atoll unless authorized by the Secretary of the Navy.

Midway's importance to the U.S. was brought into focus on December 7, 1941, when the Japanese attacked Pearl Harbor. Two destroyers bombarded Midway on the same day; this was the first Bombardment of Midway. A Pan-Am flying clipper stopped at Midway and evacuated passengers and Pan-American employees from Wake island, which had also been attacked earlier that day. The clipper was on its usual passenger route to Guam when the attack on Pearl Harbor happened; it then made a return journey going from Wake to Midway, Honolulu, and back to the USA.

A Japanese submarine bombarded Midway on February 10, 1942. In total, Midway had been attacked four times between December 7, 1941 and the Japanese submarine attack of February 10, 1942.

Four months later, on June 4, 1942, a major naval battle near Midway resulted in the U.S. Navy inflicting a devastating defeat on the Imperial Japanese Navy. Four Japanese fleet aircraft carriers, Akagi, Kaga, Hiryū and Sōryū, were sunk, along with the loss of hundreds of Japanese aircraft, losses that the Empire of Japan would never be able to replace. The U.S. lost the aircraft carrier Yorktown, along with a number of its carrier- and land-based aircraft that were either shot down by Japanese forces or bombed on the ground at the airfields. The Battle of Midway was, by most accounts, the beginning of the end of the Imperial Japanese Navy's control of the Pacific Ocean.

Starting in July 1942, a submarine tender was always stationed at the atoll to support submarines patrolling Japanese waters. In 1944, a floating dry dock joined the tender. After the Battle of Midway, a second airfield was developed on Sand Island. This work necessitated enlarging the island through landfill techniques that, when completed, more than doubled its size.

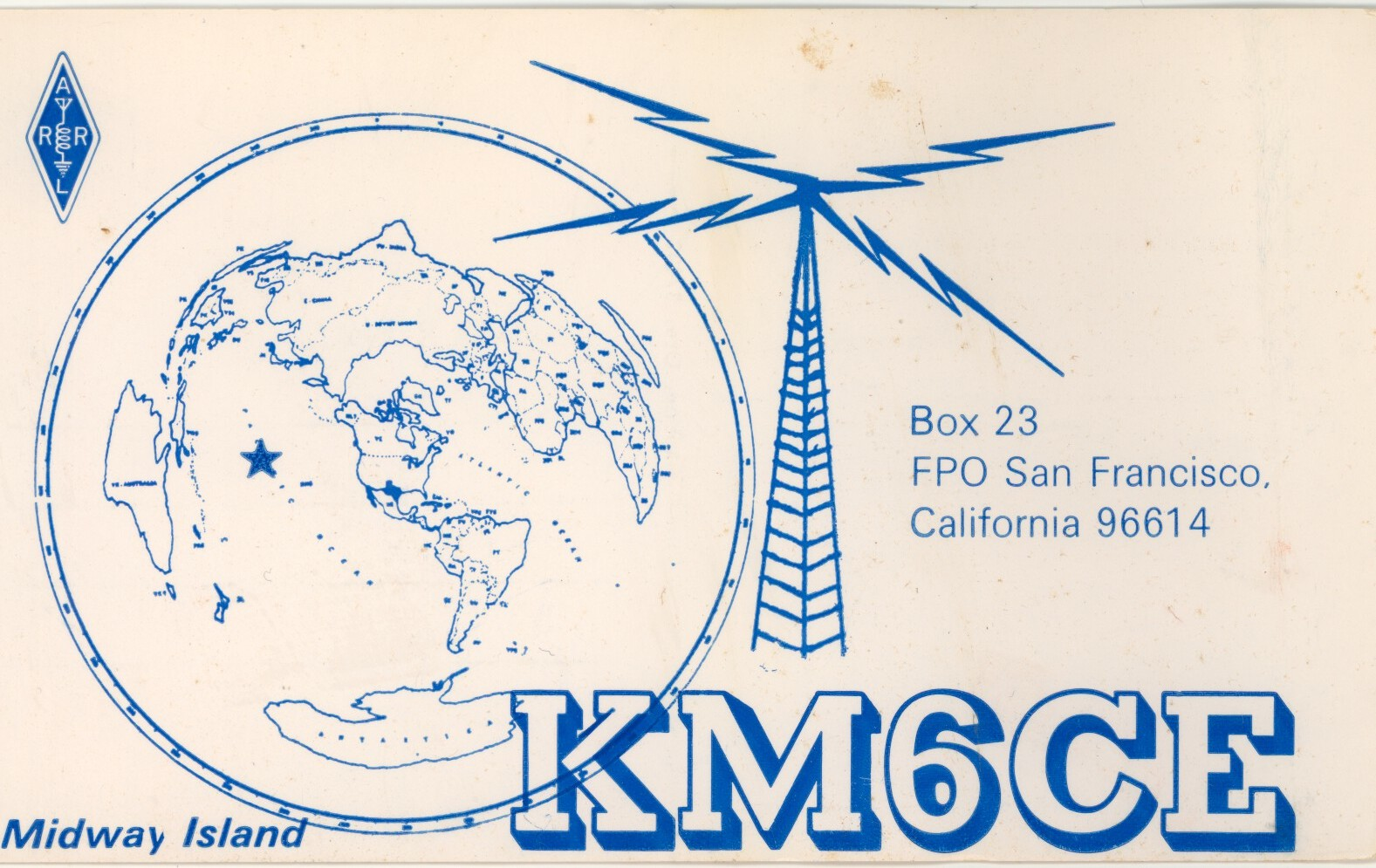
KM6CE QSL card

=== Korean and Vietnam Wars ===
From August 1, 1941, to 1945, U.S. military forces occupied Midway. In 1950, the Navy decommissioned Naval Air Station Midway, only to re-commission it again to support the Korean War. Thousands of troops on ships and aircraft stopped at Midway for refueling and emergency repairs. Midway Island was a Naval Air Facility from 1968 to September 10, 1993.

With about 3,500 people living on Sand Island, Midway supported the U.S. troops during the Vietnam War. In June 1969, President Richard Nixon met South Vietnamese President Nguyen Van Thieu at the Officer-in-Charge house, also known as "Midway House".

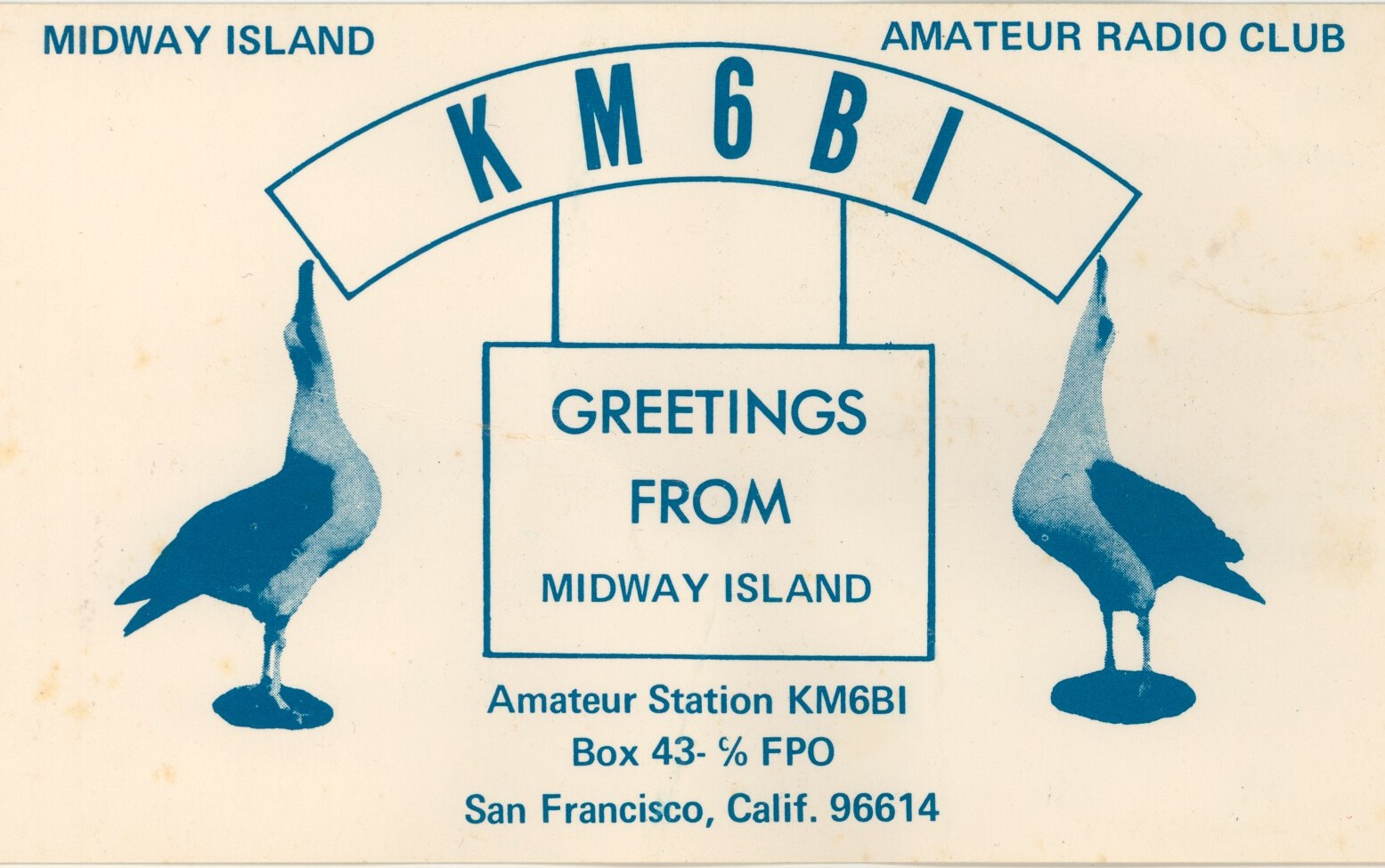
QSL card from KM6BI

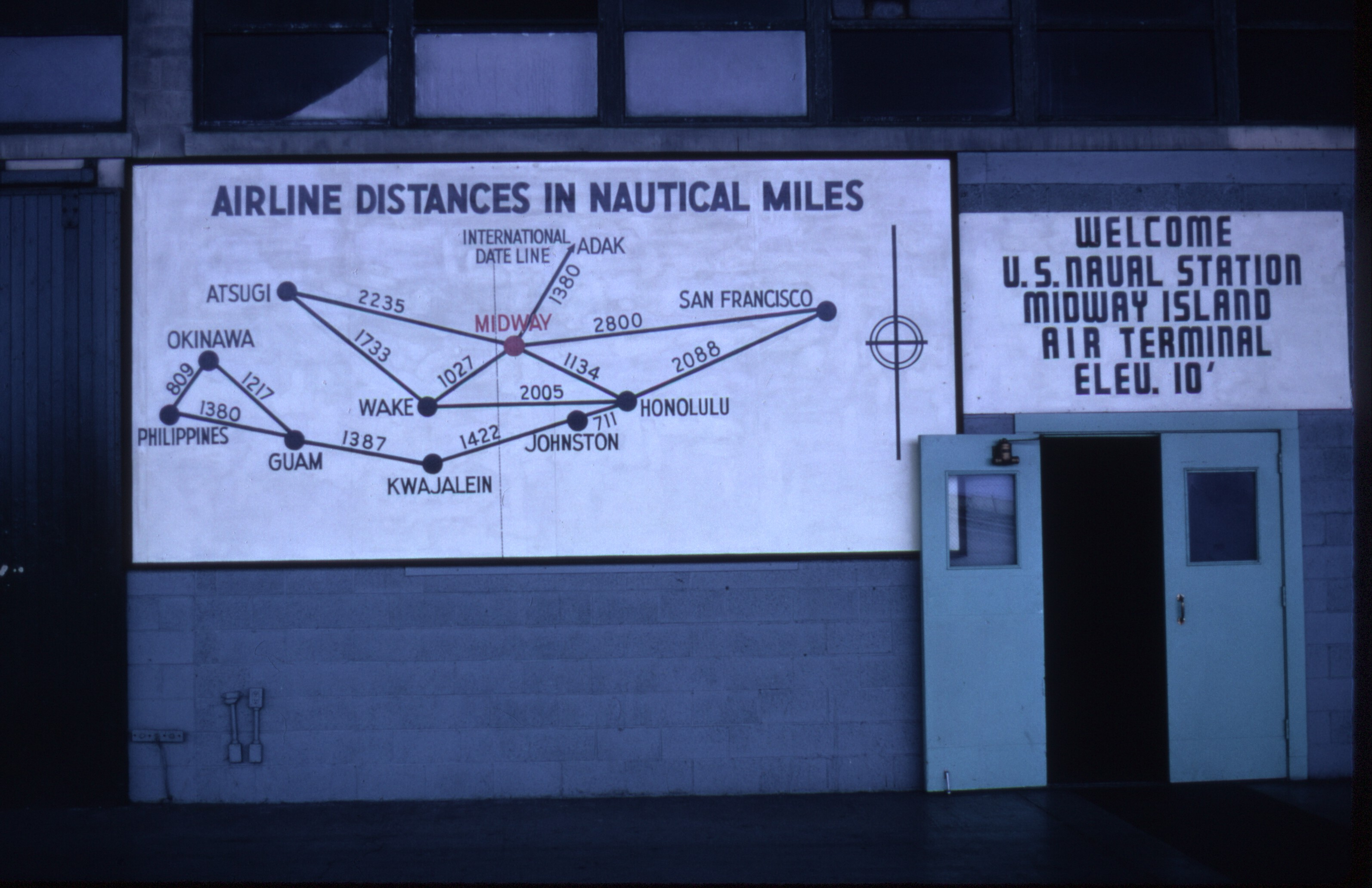
NAF Midway terminal, 1970

==== Amateur radio ====
Because of its particularly remote location and political status as a U.S. Navy base not part of the State of Hawaii, Midway was a separate country for amateur radio purposes. During this era, there were two main amateur radio stations: KM6BI on Sand Island and KM6CE on Eastern Island. Many other amateurs operated under callsigns from their quarters. They all provided a vital link to home via messages and phone patches.

In 2009, the U.S. Fish and Wildlife Service (USFWS) permitted amateur radio operations on Midway Atoll for the first time since 2002. This initiative aimed to encourage visitors to experience Midway's wildlife, history, and culture, with amateur radio being a significant aspect of this experience. The operation, designated as K4M, involved a team of 19 operators who activated the atoll for a 10-day period, operating on multiple frequencies and bands to connect with amateur radio enthusiasts worldwide.

==== Missile Impact Location System ====
From 1958 through 1960, the United States installed the Missile Impact Location System (MILS) in the Navy-managed Pacific Missile Range, later the Air Force-managed Western Range, to localize the splashdowns of test missile nose cones. MILS was developed and installed by the same entities that had completed the first phase of the Atlantic and U.S. West Coast SOSUS systems. A MILS installation, consisting of both a target array for precision location and a broad ocean area system for good positions outside the target area, was installed at Midway as part of the system supporting intercontinental ballistic missile (ICBM) tests. Other Pacific MILS shore terminals were at the Marine Corps Air Station Kaneohe Bay supporting intermediate range ballistic missile tests with impact areas northeast of Hawaii and the other ICBM test support systems at Wake Island and Eniwetok.

==== Eastern Island ====
Eastern Island, part of Midway Atoll, played a significant role during the Cold War as a site for U.S. naval intelligence operations. From July 1, 1954, to February 1971, it hosted the Naval Security Group Activity (NSGA), Midway Island, which was responsible for operating the AN/GRD-6 High-Frequency Direction Finding (HFDF) system. This system was integral to both the Eastern and Western Pacific HFDF networks, providing critical capabilities in tracking and monitoring high-frequency radio communications.

The AN/GRD-6 HFDF system was designed to automatically provide azimuth indications within the frequency range of 2 to 32 MHz. It featured two antenna arrays: a low-frequency array covering 2 to 8 MHz and a high-frequency array covering 8 to 32 MHz. Each array consisted of multiple monopole antennas arranged in a circular pattern, with a sense antenna positioned at the center. Beneath each array, a circular copper wire mesh ground mat was buried to ensure consistent and reliable direction-finding performance, independent of local ground conductivity. The system included superheterodyne receivers and cathode ray tube indicators to display the direction of incoming signals.

The strategic location of Eastern Island allowed the NSGA to monitor vast expanses of the Pacific Ocean, contributing to the U.S. Navy's efforts in signals intelligence and maritime surveillance during a period marked by heightened geopolitical tensions. The data collected through the AN/GRD-6 system supported various military operations and enhanced the United States' situational awareness in the region.

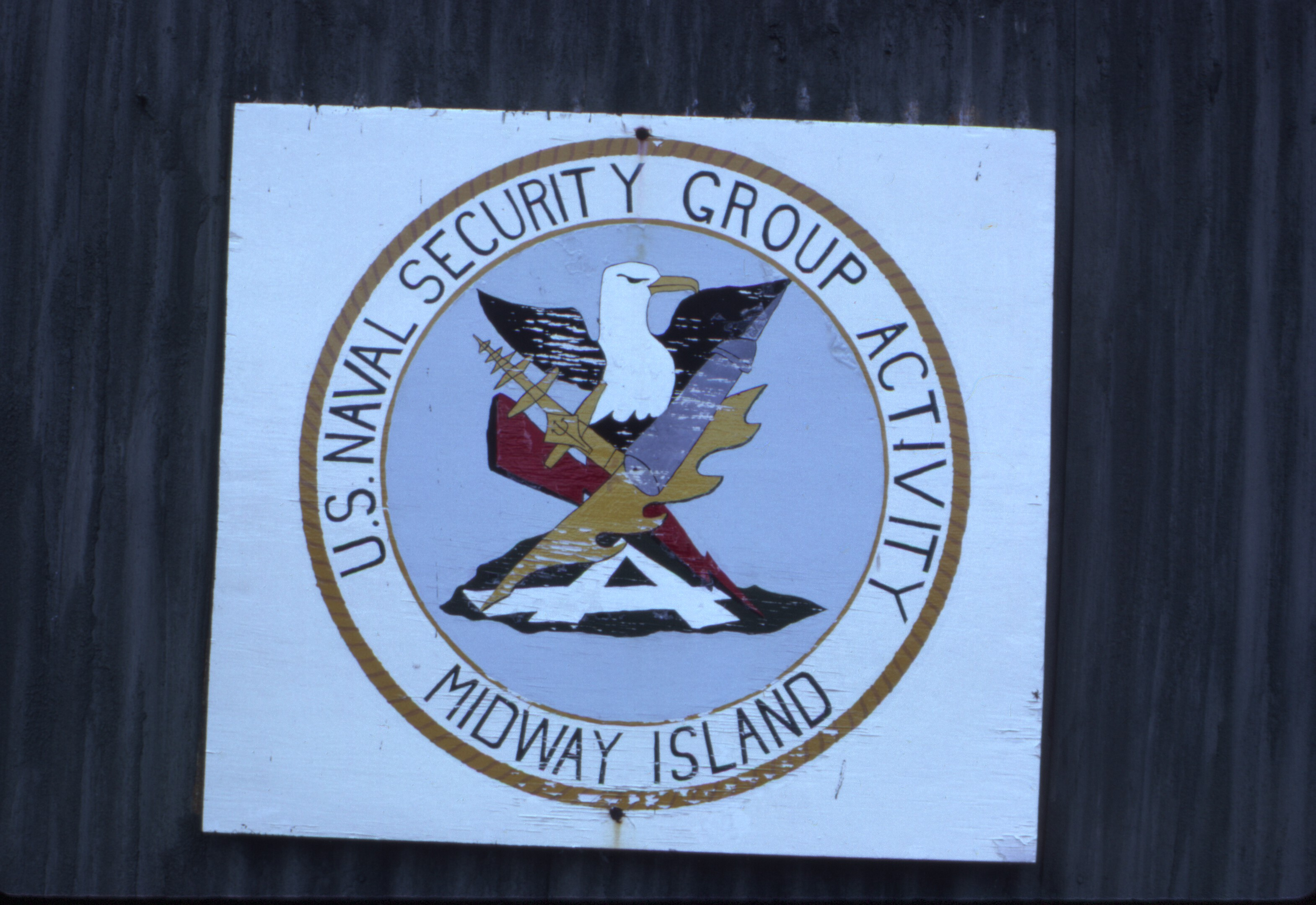
NSGA sign, 1970

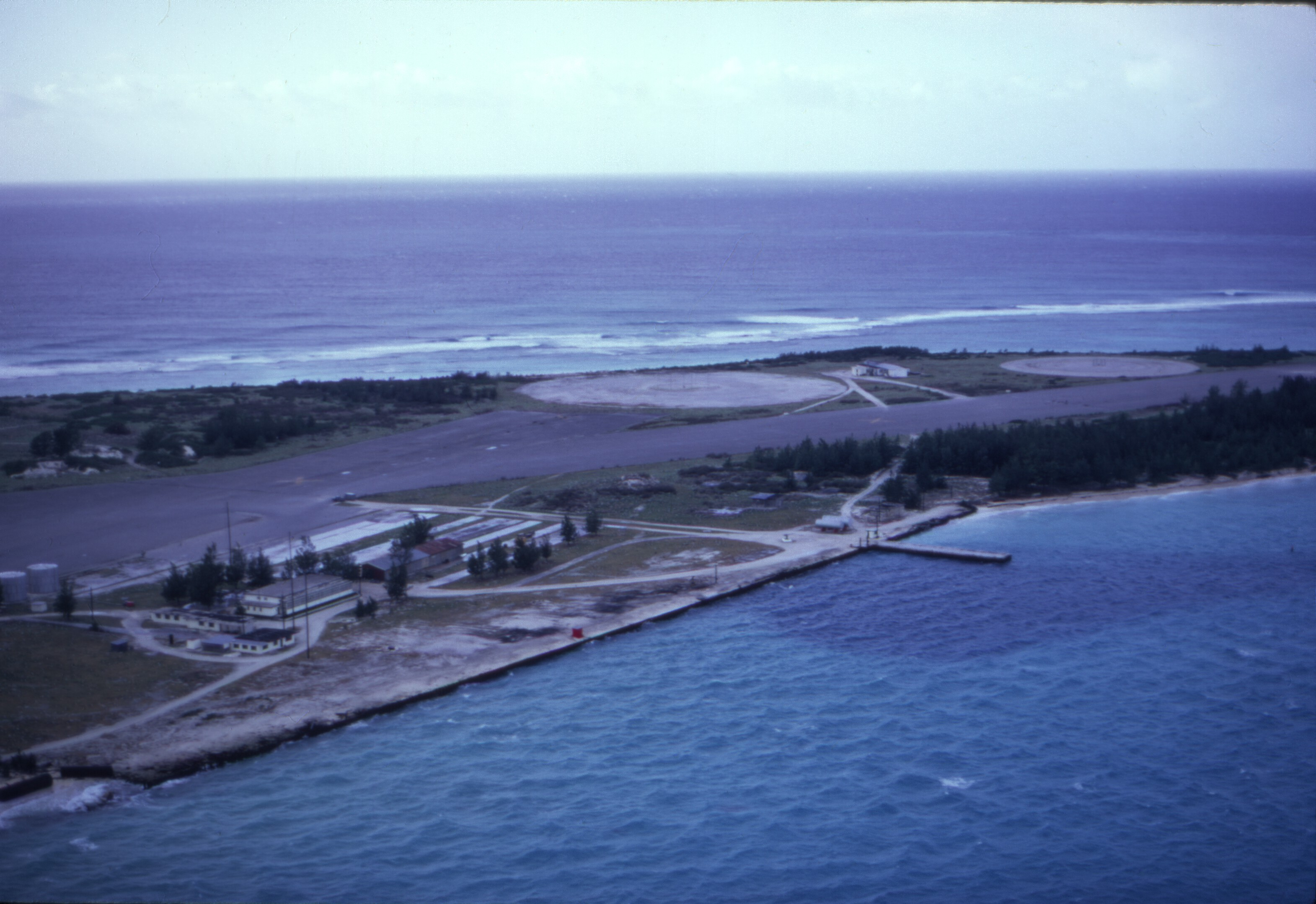
NSGA Eastern Island, 1970

==== Naval Facility Midway ====
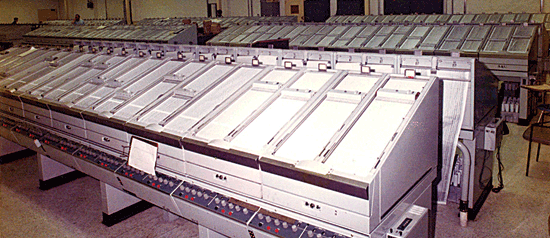
Lofargram writers on NAVFAC watch floor

During the Cold War, the U.S. established a shore terminal, in which output of the array at sea was processed and displayed using the Low-Frequency Analyzer and Recorder (LOFAR), of the Sound Surveillance System (SOSUS), Naval Facility (NAVFAC) Midway Island, to track Soviet submarines. The facility became operational in 1968 and was commissioned on January 13, 1969. It remained secret until its decommissioning on September 30, 1983, after data from its arrays had been removed first to Naval Facility Barbers Point, Hawaii, in 1981 and then directly to the Naval Ocean Processing Facility (NOPF) Ford Island, Hawaii. U.S. Navy WV-2

=== Civilian handover ===
In 1978, the Navy downgraded Midway from a Naval Air Station to a Naval Air Facility, and many personnel and dependents began leaving the island. With the war in Vietnam over and with the introduction of reconnaissance satellites and nuclear submarines, Midway's significance to U.S. national security was diminished. The World War II facilities at Sand and Eastern Islands were listed on the National Register of Historic Places on May 28, 1987, and were simultaneously added as a National Historic Landmark.

As part of the Base Realignment and Closure process, the Navy facility on Midway has been operationally closed since September 10, 1993. However, the Navy assumed responsibility for cleaning up environmental contamination.

=== 2011 tsunami ===
The 2011 Tōhoku earthquake and tsunami on March 11 killed many birds on Midway. It was reported that a 1.5 m (4.9 ft) -tall wave completely submerged the atoll's reef inlets and Spit Island, killing more than 110,000 nesting seabirds at the National Wildlife Refuge. Scientists on the island, however, do not think it will have long-term negative impacts on the bird populations.

A U.S. Geological Survey study found that the Midway Atoll, Laysan, and Pacific islands like them could become inundated and unfit to live on during the 21st century, due to increased storm waves and rising sea levels.

== National Wildlife Refuge and National Monument ==
Midway Atoll National Wildlife Refuge and Battle of Midway National Memorial
- IUCN category IV (habitat/species management area)
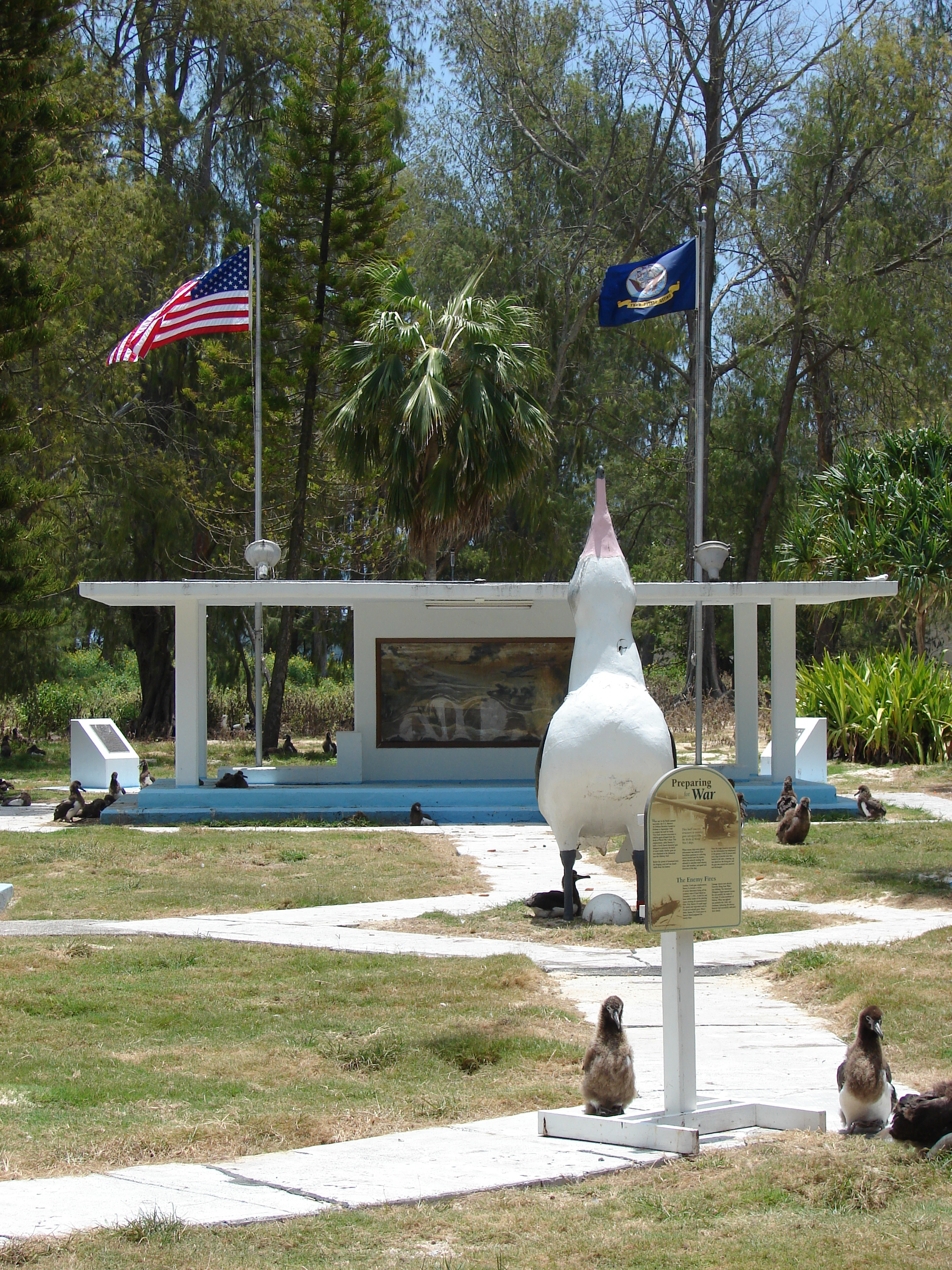
- Navy memorial and gooney monument with Laysan albatross chicks
- Interactive map of Midway Atoll National Wildlife Refuge and Battle of Midway National Memorial
- Location: Midway Atoll
- Area: 2,365.3 km^{2} (913.2 mi^{2})
- Established: 1988
- Governing body: United States Fish & Wildlife Service
- Website: Midway Atoll National Wildlife Refuge and Battle of Midway National Memorial

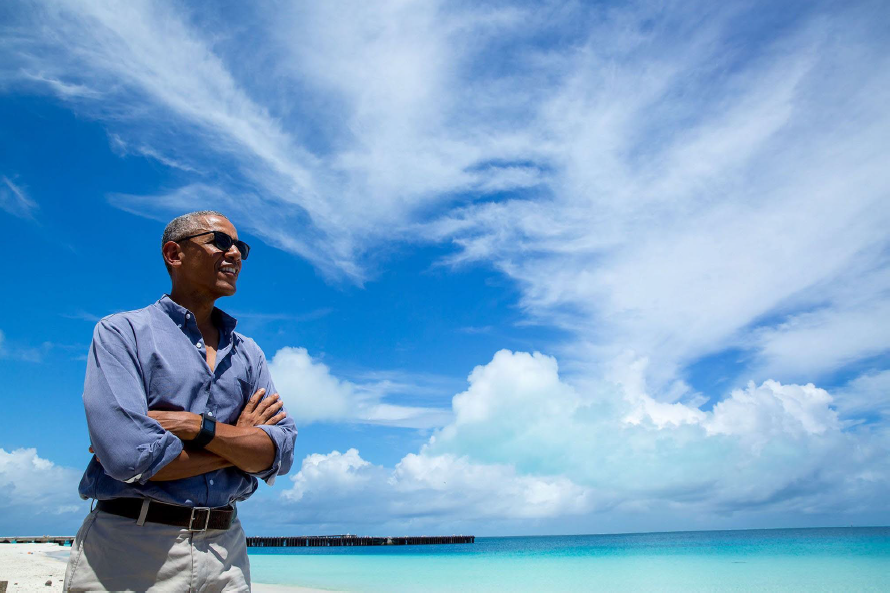
President Barack Obama visits Midway Atoll to announce the expansion of the Papahānaumokuākea Marine National Monument in 2016.

The unofficial flag of Midway Atoll, designed by local Fish and Wildlife Service employee Steve Dryden, was introduced on June 4, 2000, the 58th anniversary of the Battle of Midway.

Midway was designated an overlay National Wildlife Refuge on April 22, 1988, while still under the primary jurisdiction of the Navy.

From August 1996, the general public could visit the atoll through study ecotours. This program ended in 2002, but another visitor program was approved and began operating in March 2008. This program operated through 2012, but was suspended in 2013 due to budget cuts.

On October 31, 1996, President Bill Clinton signed Executive Order 13022, which transferred the jurisdiction and control of the atoll to the United States Department of the Interior. The FWS assumed management of the Midway Atoll National Wildlife Refuge. The last contingent of Navy personnel left Midway on June 30, 1997, after an ambitious environmental cleanup program was completed.

On September 13, 2000, Secretary of the Interior Bruce Babbitt designated the Wildlife Refuge as the Battle of Midway National Memorial. The refuge is now called the "Midway Atoll National Wildlife Refuge and Battle of Midway National Memorial".

On June 15, 2006, President George W. Bush designated the Northwestern Hawaiian Islands as a national monument. The Northwestern Hawaiian Islands Marine National Monument encompasses 105,564 sq nmi (139,798 sq mi; 362,074 km^{2}) and includes 3,910 sq nmi (5,178 sq mi; 13,411 km^{2}) of coral reef habitat. The Monument also includes the Hawaiian Islands National Wildlife Refuge and the Midway Atoll National Wildlife Refuge.

In 2007, the Monument's name was changed to Papahānaumokuākea (Hawaiian pronunciation: [ˈpɐpəˈhaːnɔuˈmokuˈaːkeə]) Marine National Monument. The National Monument is managed by the U.S. Fish and Wildlife Service, the National Oceanic and Atmospheric Administration (NOAA), and the State of Hawaii. In 2016, President Barack Obama expanded the Papahānaumokuākea Marine National Monument and added the Office of Hawaiian Affairs as a fourth co-trustee of the monument.

=== Gooney monument ===
The so-called Gooney monument was carved from a 30-foot (9.1 m) mahogany log as a personal project by a U.S. Navy dental officer stationed on the island. The project began in 1949. The statue was 11 feet (3.4 m) tall and stood for 40 years before succumbing to termite damage. It was replaced with a mock egg after its removal.

== Environment ==
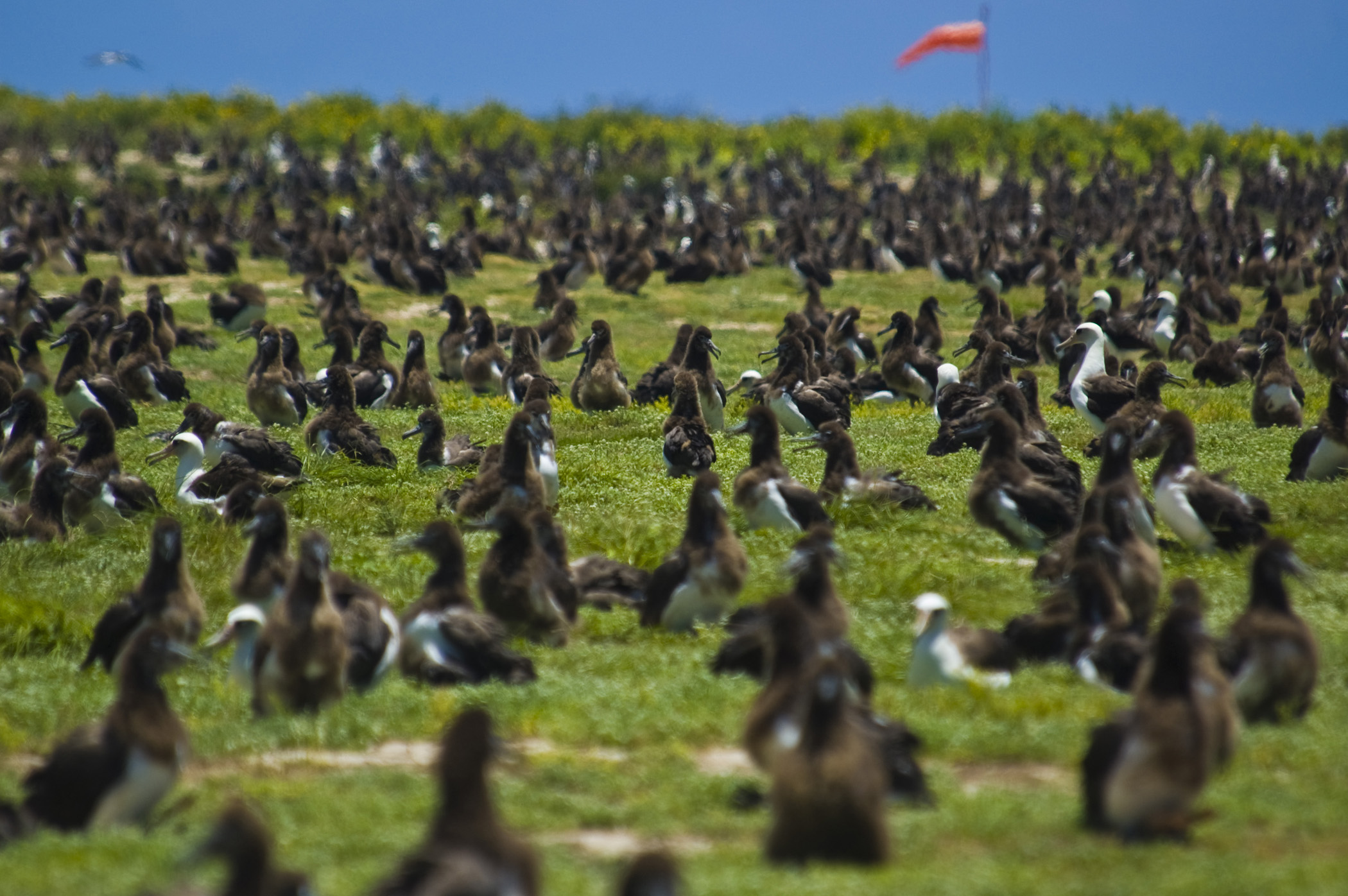
Albatrosses at Midway Atoll

Midway Atoll forms part of the Northwest Hawaiian Islands Important Bird Area (IBA), designated as such by BirdLife International because of its seabirds and endemic landbirds. The atoll is a critical habitat in the central Pacific Ocean and includes breeding habitat for 17 seabird species. Many native species rely on the island, which is now home to 67–70 percent of the world's Laysan albatross population and 34–39 percent of the global population of black-footed albatross. A minimal number of the very rare short-tailed albatross also have been observed. Fewer than 2,200 individuals of this species are believed to exist due to excessive feather hunting in the late nineteenth century. In 2007–08, the U.S. Fish and Wildlife Service translocated 42 endangered Laysan ducks to the atoll as part of their efforts to conserve the species. In 2025, an additional translocation project brought 100 Laysan Finch from nearby Pearl and Hermes Atoll and released them onto Eastern Island.

Over 250 different species of marine life are found in the 300,000 acres (120,000 ha) of the lagoon and surrounding waters. The critically endangered Hawaiian monk seals raise their pups on the beaches, relying on the atoll's reef fish, squid, octopus, and crustaceans. Green sea turtles, another threatened species, occasionally nest on the island. The first was found in 2006 on Spit Island and another in 2007 on Sand Island. A resident pod of 300 spinner dolphins lives in the lagoons and nearshore waters.

Human habitation has extensively altered the islands of Midway Atoll. Starting in 1869 with the project to blast the reefs and create a port on Sand Island, the environment of Midway Atoll has experienced profound changes.

Several invasive exotics have been introduced; for example, ironwood trees from Australia were planted to act as windbreaks. Of the 200 species of plants on Midway, 75 percent are non-native. Recent efforts have focused on removing non-native plant species and re-planting native species.

Lead paint on the buildings posed an environmental hazard (avian lead poisoning) to the albatross population of the island. In 2018, a project to strip the paint was completed.

=== Pollution ===
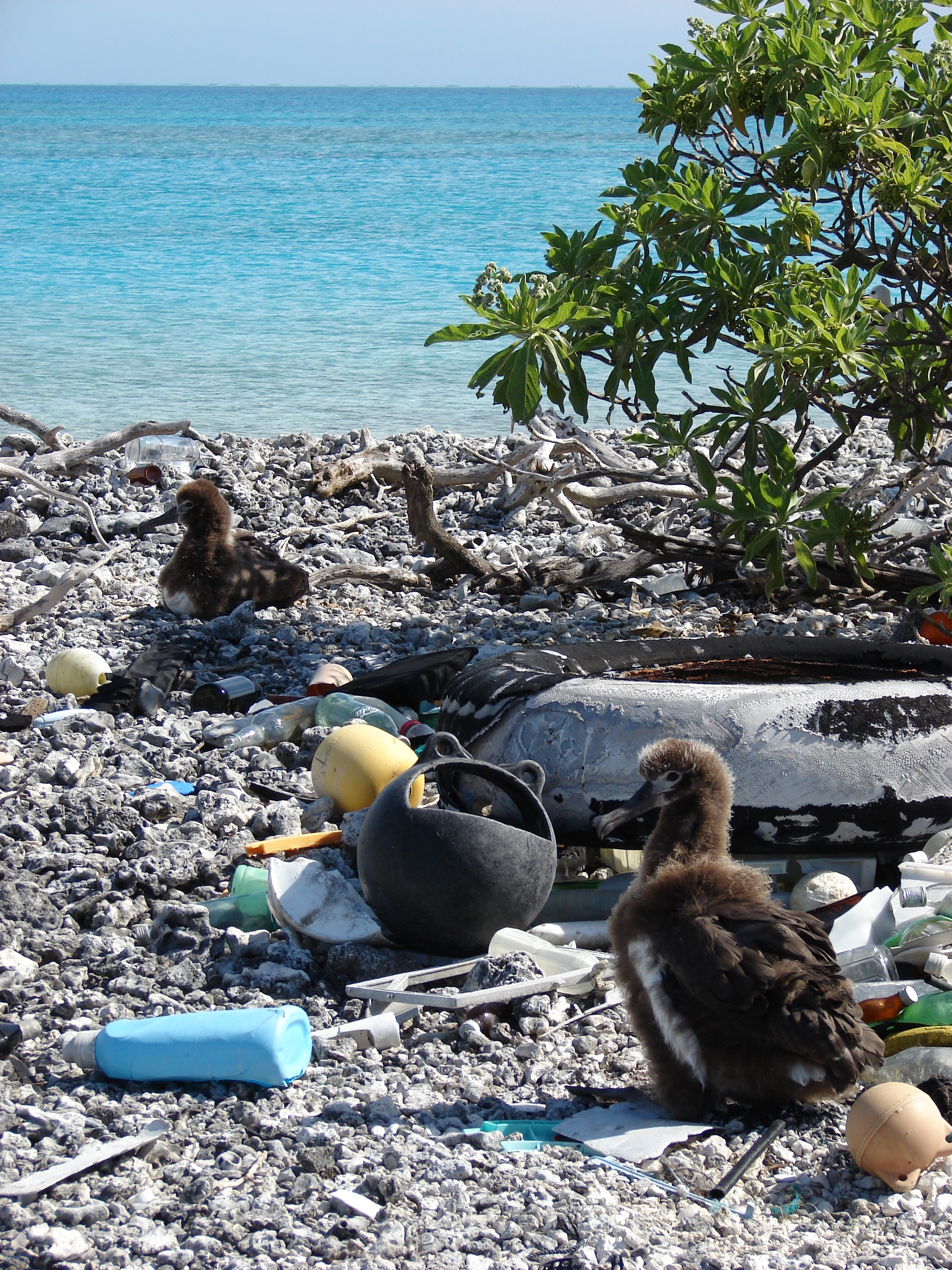
Marine debris with Laysan albatross chicks

Midway Atoll, in common with all the Hawaiian Islands, receives substantial amounts of marine debris from the Great Pacific Garbage Patch. Consisting of 90 percent plastic, approximately 20 tons of this debris accumulates on the beaches of Midway every year. The garbage is hazardous to the island's bird population: approximately 5 tons of debris is fed to albatross chicks by their parents, but the parents often collect the debris while they are out at sea. The U.S. Fish and Wildlife Service estimates at least 100 lb (45 kg) of plastic washes up every week.

Of the 1.5 million Laysan albatrosses that inhabit Midway during the winter breeding season, nearly all are found to have plastic in their digestive system. Approximately one-third of the chicks die. These deaths are attributed to the albatrosses confusing brightly colored plastic with marine animals (such as squid and fish) for food. Recent results suggest that oceanic plastic develops a chemical olfactory signature that is normally used by seabirds to locate food items.

Because albatross chicks do not develop the reflex to regurgitate until they are four months old, they cannot expel the plastic pieces. Albatrosses are not the only species to suffer from the plastic pollution; sea turtles and monk seals also consume the debris. Various plastic items wash upon the shores, from cigarette lighters to toothbrushes and toys. An albatross living on Midway can have up to 50 percent of its intestinal tract filled with plastic.

== Transportation ==
The usual method of reaching Sand Island, Midway Atoll's only populated island, is on chartered aircraft landing at Sand Island's Henderson Field, which also functions as an emergency diversion point runway for transpacific flights. An example of this occurring was in 2011, where Delta Air Lines Flight 277, a Boeing 747-400 traveling from Honolulu to Osaka made an emergency landing at Henderson Field due to a cracked windshield. The US National Wildlife Refuge employees working on the atoll assisted the landing and cared for the nearly 380 passengers and crew for eight hours until a backup plane arrived. No injuries were reported.

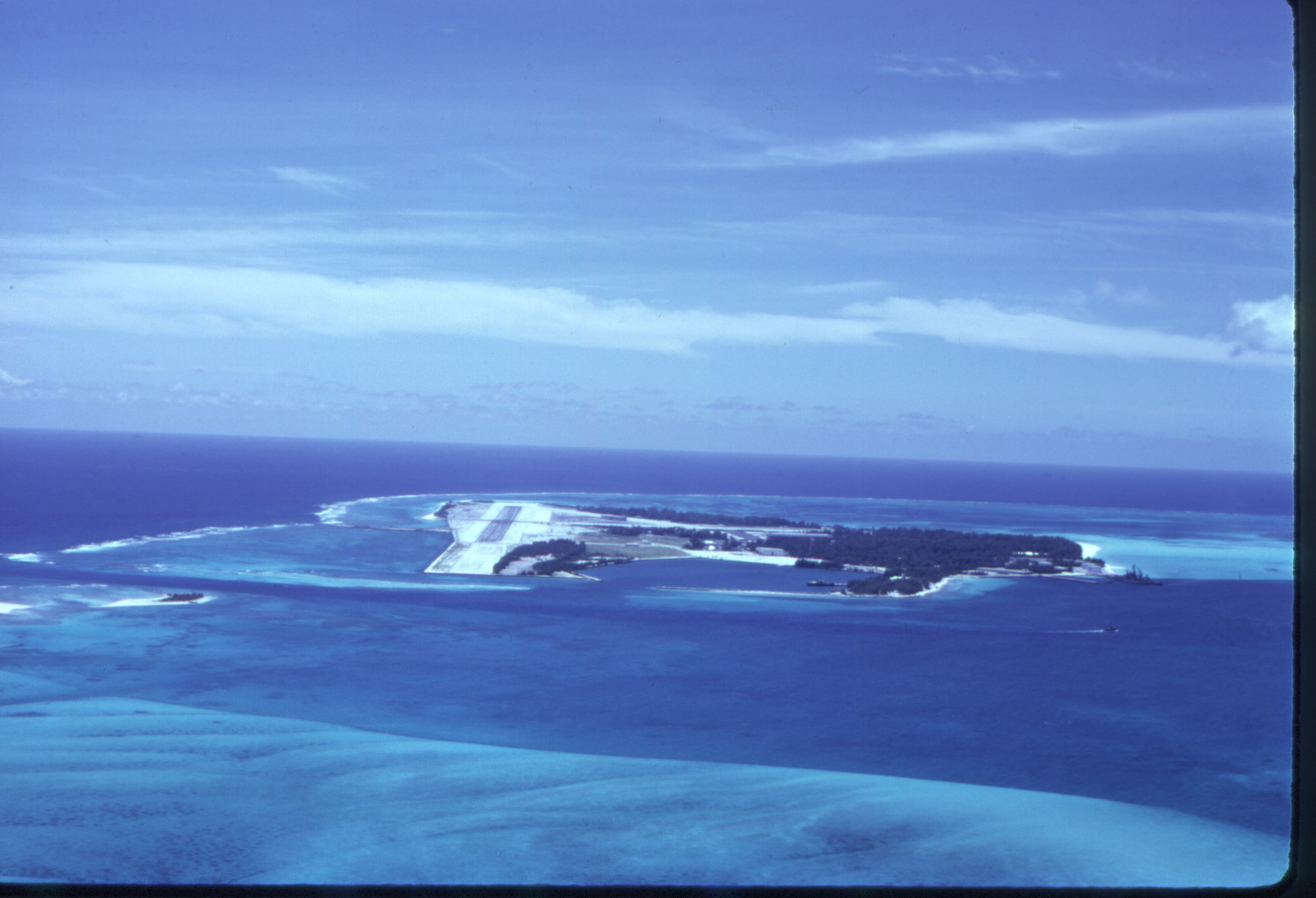
MDY approach

== See also ==
- Desert island
- Lists of islands
- List of national memorials of the United States
