= Abdications of Bayonne =

1808 relinquishing of the Spanish throne to Napoleon

Bayonne Abdications
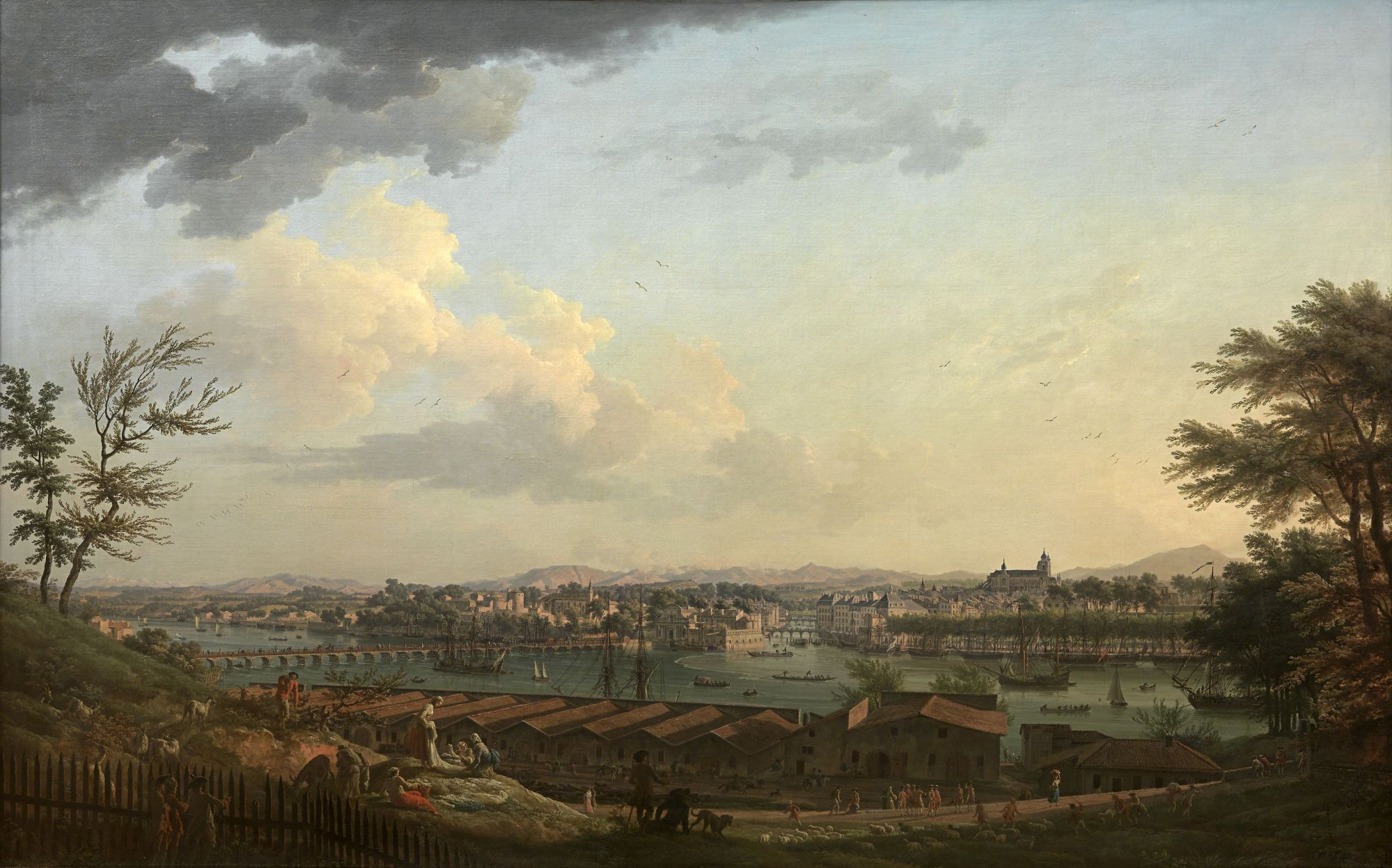
- View of Bayonne in 1760.
- Date: May 5–7, 1808
- Location: Bayonne, France
- Participants: Charles IV of Spain, Ferdinand VII of Spain, Napoleon Bonaparte
- Outcome: Abdication of Spanish throne by Charles IV and Ferdinand VII in favor of Napoleon, who appointed his brother Joseph I as King of Spain

The abdications of Bayonne took place on May 5, 6, and 7 of 1808 in the castle of Marracq in Bayonne when the French emperor Napoleon I forced two Spanish kings—Charles IV and his son, Ferdinand VII—to renounce the throne in his favour. The move was Napoleon's response to the Tumult of Aranjuez (17–19 March), when Ferdinand VII forced his father's first abdication, and the uprising of 2 May against French troops in Spain (present in accordance with the Treaty of Fontainebleau). Napoleon in his turn handed the crown of Spain to his brother Joseph Bonaparte.The result of the abdications was further resistance to the French presence, resulting in the Peninsular War (1808–1814), a contributing factor to Napoleon's final defeat. Napoleon was eventually forced to release Ferdinand. On 11 December 1813, he reinstalled him as King of Spain (Treaty of Valençay).

The abdications were widely regarded as coerced. However, some historians have noted that neither Charles IV nor Ferdinand VII were adequately equipped to resist Napoleon's pressures and threats. Some authors have claimed they were "kidnapped" by Napoleon, though others avoid using this term to describe the events in Bayonne.

The abdications were not recognized in Spain or Spanish America by the "patriots". According to François-Xavier Guerra, the rejection of the new king Joseph I and loyalty to the captive Ferdinand VII were "widespread across all parts of the monarchy". However, some Spaniards, particularly among the enlightened elite, supported Joseph I, initially being called "traitors" or "sworn ones", and later "josefinos" or, pejoratively, "afrancesados". Spanish "patriots" referred to Joseph I as the "intruder king". Days after Joseph I hurriedly left Madrid on July 31 due to the French defeat at the Battle of Bailén, the Council of Castile declared the Bayonne abdications null. On August 24, Ferdinand VII was proclaimed king in absentia. Subsequently, on January 14, 1809, the United Kingdom, the main enemy of the First French Empire, recognized Ferdinand VII as King of Spain in the Treaty of Apodaca-Canning. With the direct intervention of the Grande Armée led personally by Napoleon, Joseph I regained the throne, which he held until June 1813. As some Spaniards supported him, the Spanish War of Independence also had elements of a civil war.

== Background: Napoleon's Intervention in Spain ==
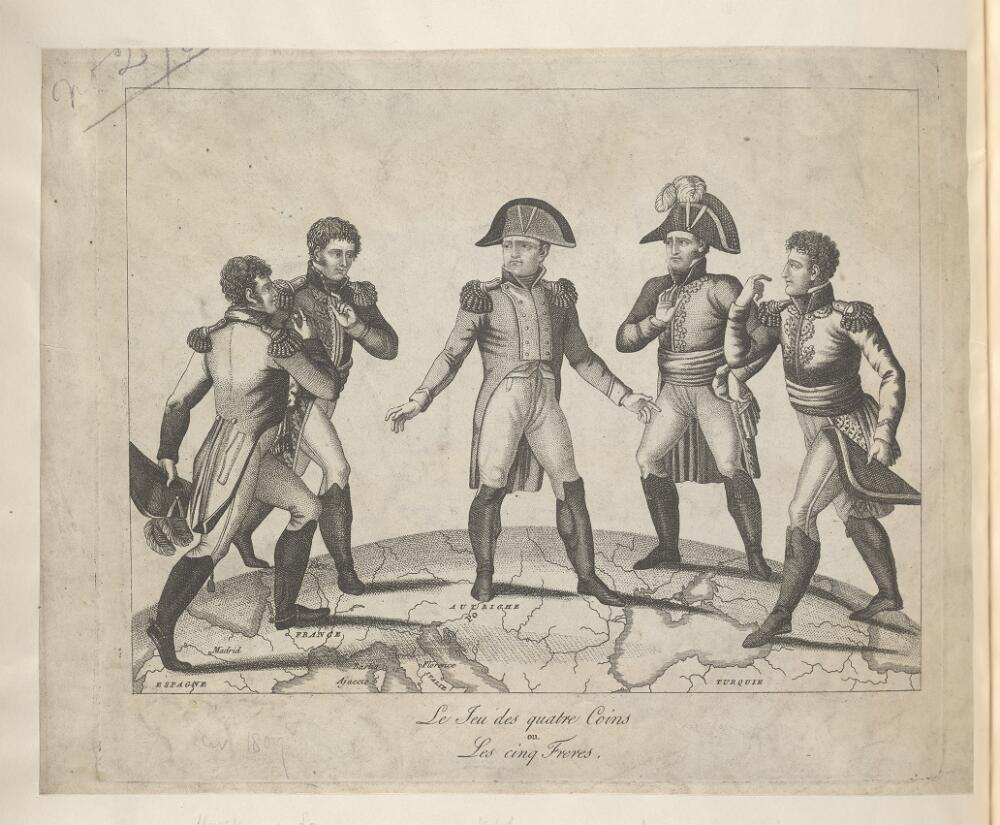
Satirical caricature of the Napoleonic Empire and the House of Bonaparte titled "The Game of Four Corners or the Five Brothers" (1807). It features Joseph Bonaparte, King of Naples; Louis Bonaparte, King of Holland; Emperor Napoleon Bonaparte (center); Jerome Bonaparte, King of Westphalia; and Joachim Murat, brother-in-law of the Bonaparte siblings.

The moment when Napoleon decided to openly intervene in the monarchy of Charles IV, an ally of the French Republic since the treaty of Basel in 1795, has been a subject of debate. Miguel Artola places it after the Escorial conspiracy uncovered on October 27, 1807—an unsuccessful attempt by the Prince of Asturias, Ferdinand, to end the government of the "favorite" Manuel Godoy and likely force his father to abdicate the Crown of Spain. This demonstrated to the Emperor the instability of his southern ally, whose foreign policy he had been influencing since 1801. French historian Thierry Lentz concurs: "It was probably around this time that the definitive decision to intervene in Spain, not merely to choose between Charles and Ferdinand, took shape." The French ambassador François de Beauharnais, implicated in the conspiracy, may have also influenced the decision, writing to the Emperor: "It is solely from Your Imperial Majesty that the Spanish nation expects its salvation, and it can be assured that throughout the kingdom, there are only ardent friends of France."

During his captivity on the island of Saint Helena, Napoleon wrote: "We could not leave Spain at our backs, at the disposal of our enemies. It was necessary to bind it, willingly or by force, to our system." He also noted: "The Spanish nation despised its government; it cried out for the good of regeneration. I could hope to achieve it without shedding blood; the dissensions of the royal family had stained it with general contempt." Thierry Lentz has pointed out that the decision to intervene in Spanish politics was also influenced by "a sense of superiority toward a kingdom that was taken little seriously... This tragicomic Spain was summarized, in French minds, as a country characterized by religious obscurantism, the vanity of the nobility, the poverty, and the ignorance of the people... The worst part is that these sentiments could be found word for word in the numerous reports reaching the Emperor’s desk."

Artola has noted that at that time, Napoleon did not initially plan to replace the Bourbons but rather to annex the Spanish "provinces" north of the Ebro River, shifting the Franco-Spanish border to this river, as in the times of the Carolingian Empire. This plan would be completed by marrying Prince Ferdinand to a princess from his family, though this did not materialize due to Lucien Bonaparte’s refusal to consent to his eldest daughter Charlotte being chosen. To execute his plan to dismember Spain, Napoleon seized the opportunity provided by the Treaty of Fontainebleau (1807), signed on the same day the Escorial Conspiracy was uncovered, which allowed a French army to cross Spain to conquer the Kingdom of Portugal. Although Marshal Junot had already entered Lisbon on November 30, between December 22, 1807, and February 6, 1808, three new army corps led by Marshals Dupont, Moncey, and Duhesme crossed the Franco-Spanish border. On February 20, Marshal Joachim Murat was appointed lieutenant general of the French troops in Spain (between 80,000 and 100,000 men).

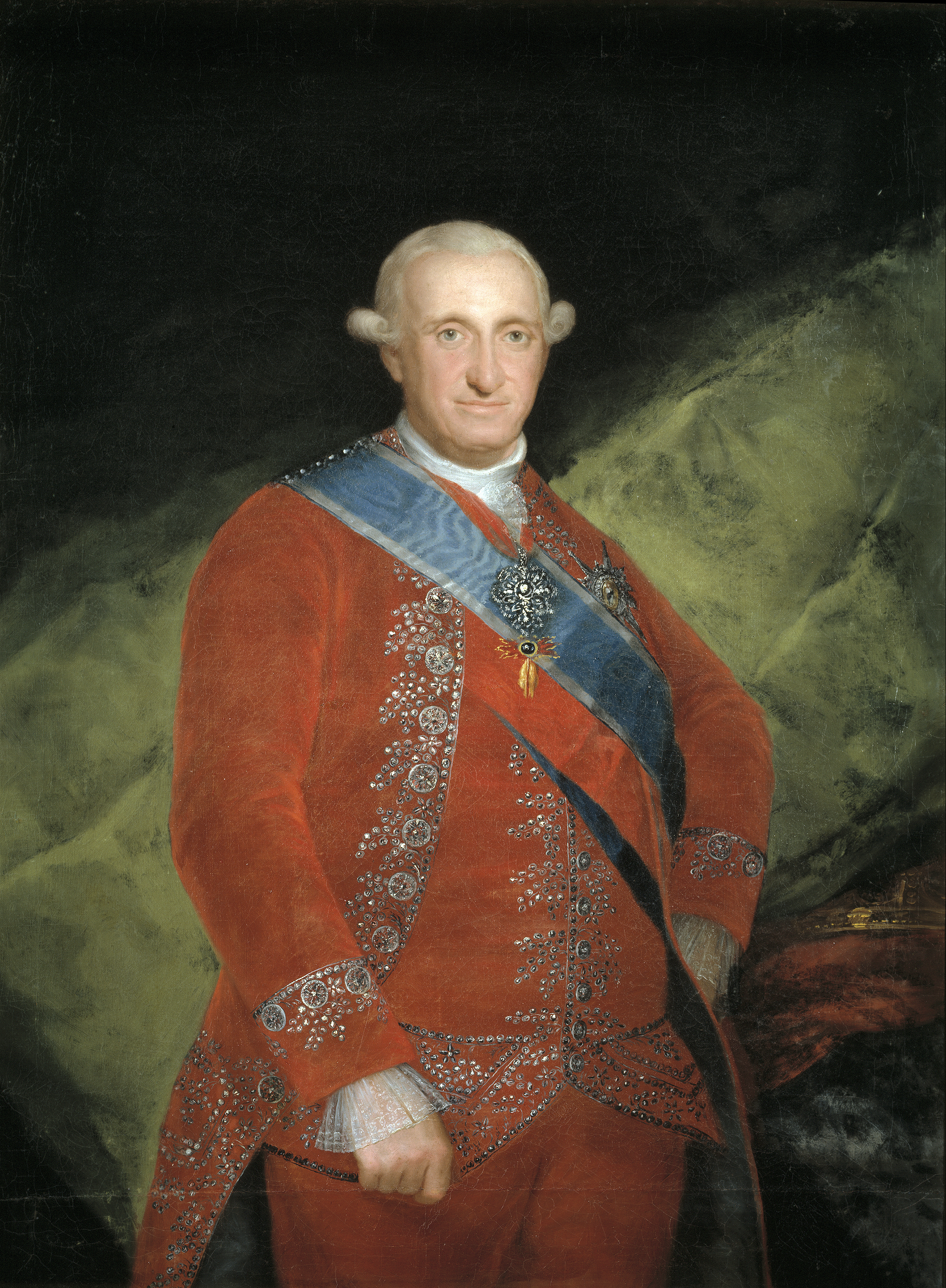
Charles IV, forced to abdicate in favor of his son Ferdinand VII due to the tumult of Aranjuez.

Meanwhile, Napoleon sought to stay well-informed about events in Spain. An aide sent to Spain reported back on December 20: "Spain, in its misfortunes, looks to His Imperial Majesty [Napoleon I] as the only one who can save it; it is expected that he will deign to take the Prince of Asturias under his protection, choose him a wife, and free Spain from the tyranny that oppresses it... You cannot imagine the ruin in which Spain finds itself." In a document sent to Charles IV in late February 1808, titled Especies y cuestiones proponibles, Napoleon, in Artola’s words, "revealed his hand", proposing to exchange Portugal for Spain’s border provinces with France. To seal the agreement, he suggested reestablishing "a pact equivalent to the pacte de famille and even more perfect."

The "chaos", as Artola describes it, caused by the events known as the tumult of Aranjuez—the ousting of Godoy and Charles IV’s abdication in favor of his heir, Ferdinand— ultimately prompted Napoleon to replace the Bourbons with a member of his family. "The annexation of part of the kingdom no longer made sense, as the Emperor could not trust Ferdinand after his reprehensible maneuvers to dethrone his father and the cruelty shown toward Godoy. The only option was to dispense with the House of Bourbon and apply the system used elsewhere, that is, to place a member of Napoleon’s family on the throne," stated Emilio La Parra López.

It appears that his minister Talleyrand was the first to advise this course of action. In a memorandum to Napoleon, he wrote: "There is only one branch of the House of Bourbon on the throne, that of Spain, which, positioned at our backs when facing the German powers, will always be threatening... The time has come to declare that the last House of Bourbon has ceased to reign... A prince of the imperial house occupying the Spanish throne would complete the Empire’s system... For all this, an army of 30,000 men would suffice." After the Mutiny of Aranjuez, Minister Jean-Baptiste Nompère de Champagny, with Napoleon’s input, presented a detailed report concluding: "I have outlined to Your Majesty the circumstances that compel a significant decision. Policy advises it, justice authorizes it, and Spain’s disturbances necessitate it. Your Majesty must, therefore, ensure the security of your Empire and save Spain from English influence."

== Ferdinand VII’s trip to Bayonne ==
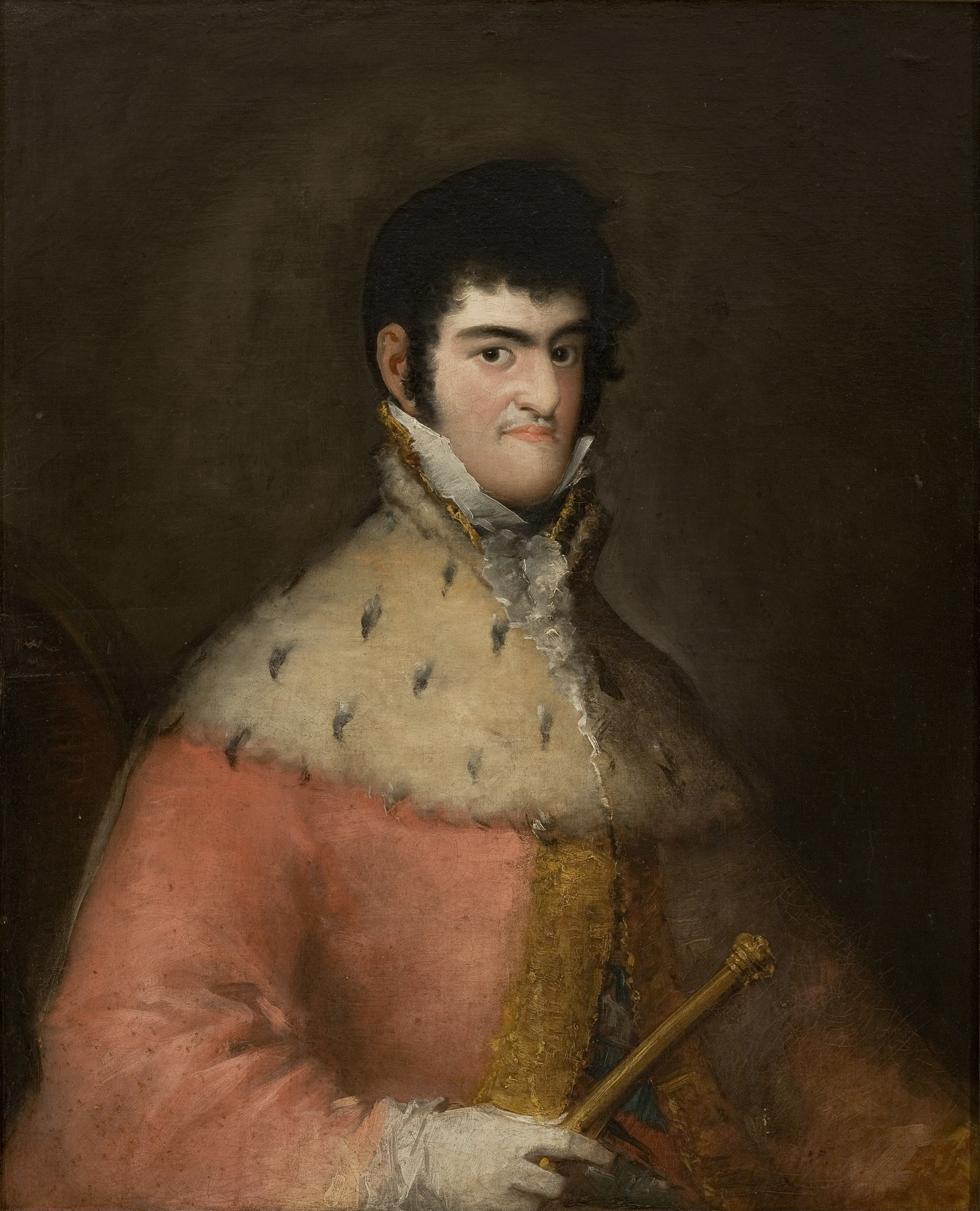
Portrait of Ferdinand VII by Goya (1808).

Upon ascending the throne, Ferdinand VII sent the Duke of Parque to pay respects to Marshal Joachim Murat, lieutenant general of the French troops in Spain. However, neither Murat nor the French ambassador François de Beauharnais reciprocated when Ferdinand VII made his triumphal entry into Madrid on March 24, nor did Napoleon send any note. French military and civil authorities did not address him as "Majesty" but as "His Royal Highness," the same title used when he was Prince of Asturias, which, according to Emilio La Parra López, "was very revealing of France’s attitude" and "highly concerning for him, aware that maintaining his crown depended on the French Emperor’s recognition. Obtaining it became his obsession." On March 26, Ferdinand wrote to the French ambassador: "My intentions are the happiness of seeing His Imperial and Royal Majesty [Napoleon] and following his advice." A week later, on April 2, the Council of Castile issued a proclamation reiterating that the French were in Spain "to execute plans agreed with His Majesty against the common enemy" [England] and announced that anyone disturbing "this friendly and reciprocal correspondence" with "the slightest excess" would be punished. Meanwhile, Ferdinand’s propaganda claimed the imperial army had entered Spain to protect the new king from the schemes of the "Godoyists". However, by then, Napoleon had already decided to replace the Bourbons with a family member, though he had not disclosed this even to his closest collaborators or his lieutenant in Spain, Marshal Murat.

On April 3, Ferdinand VII informed Murat that he would travel to meet Napoleon, who the previous day had been announced to soon arrive in Spain. "Meeting Napoleon in person was vital for Ferdinand, as he urgently needed his recognition and to counter unfavorable reports reaching the Emperor and prevent potential moves by Charles IV. Ferdinand’s circle knew—or at least suspected—that Charles IV had protested his abdication." Indeed, just two days after his abdication on March 19, Charles IV had given General Monthion, sent by Murat to Aranjuez, a note stating he was forced to renounce the Crown "to avoid greater evils and the shedding of my dear vassals’ blood." On March 27, he wrote to Napoleon requesting his protection, explaining that he had abdicated "under the force of circumstances, when the noise of arms and the clamor of a mutinous guard made it clear that I had to choose between life and death, which would have been followed by that of the Queen." Historian Emilio La Parra López comments: "In the language of the Old Regime, the former king was effectively describing the events as a coup d’état." The letter to Napoleon read:

My Lord and Brother: Your Majesty will undoubtedly have heard with sorrow of the events in Aranjuez and their consequences, and will not look with indifference upon a king who, forced to renounce the crown, seeks refuge in the arms of a great monarch, his ally, fully submitting to the decisions of the only one who can grant him happiness, that of his entire family, and that of his loyal vassals.
I did not renounce in favor of my son except under the force of circumstances, when the clamor of arms and the shouts of a rebellious guard made it clear that I had to choose between life and death...
I was forced to renounce; but I have resolved to comply with all that Your Majesty may decide regarding us and the fate of the Queen and the Prince of Peace [Manuel Godoy].

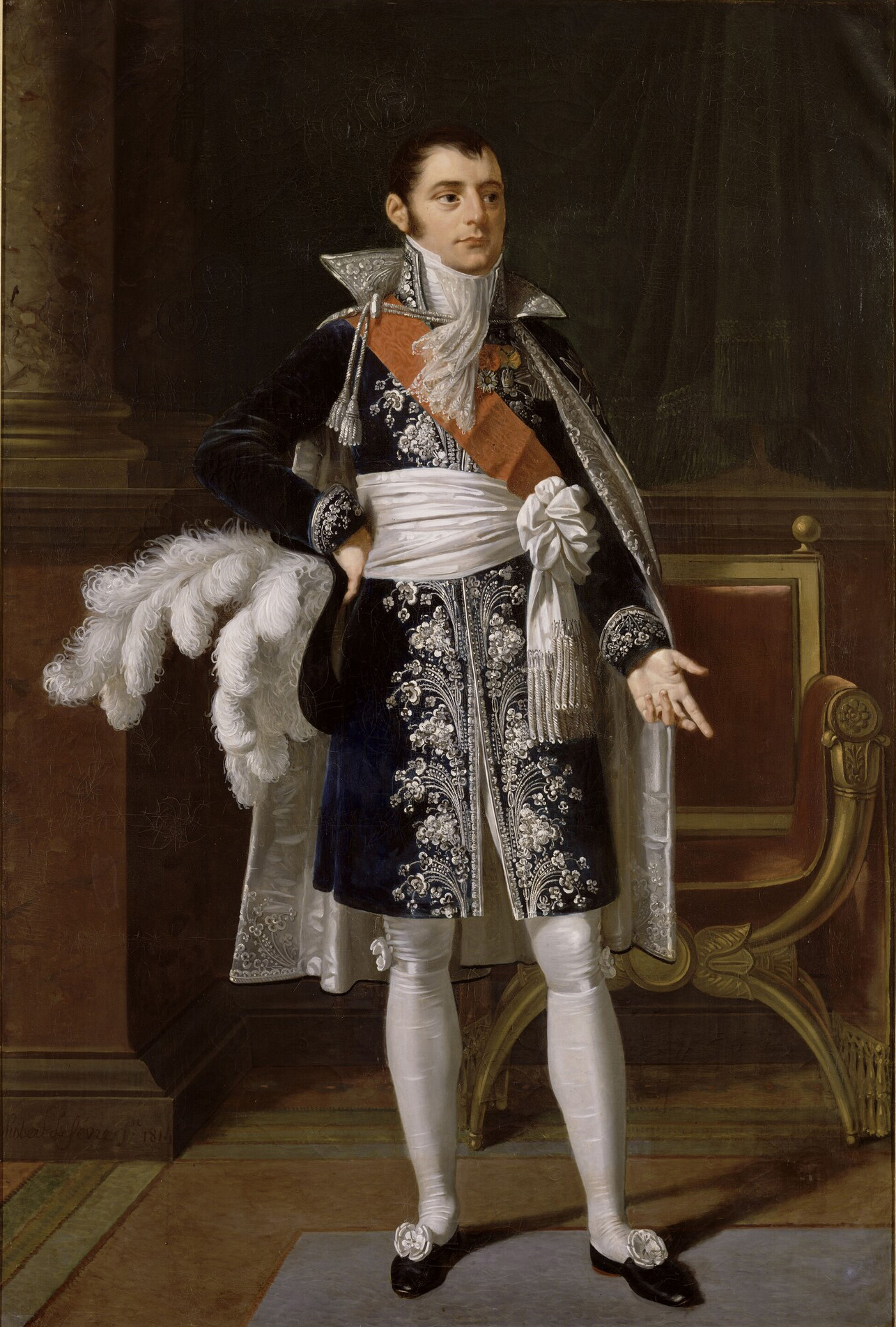
Portrait of French general Anne Jean Marie René Savary, sent by Napoleon to gain Ferdinand VII’s trust and lead him to Bayonne.

On April 4, the Infante Carlos María Isidro de Borbón departed Madrid, accompanied by three Grandees of Spain—the Dukes of Frías, Medinaceli, and the Count of Fernán Núñez—to prepare for the meeting with the Emperor. By April 8, they had reached Tolosa, after passing through Valladolid, Burgos, and Vitoria, without any news of Napoleon’s whereabouts. It was only known that he had left Paris for Bayonne on April 2. On April 7, Napoleon’s special envoy, General Anne Jean Marie René Savary, arrived in Madrid, informing Ferdinand VII that the Emperor had placed his father Charles IV under his protection and that a meeting was urgently necessary. Napoleon’s mission for Savary was to gain Ferdinand VII’s trust—hence using the title "Majesty" during their meeting—and escort him to Bayonne.

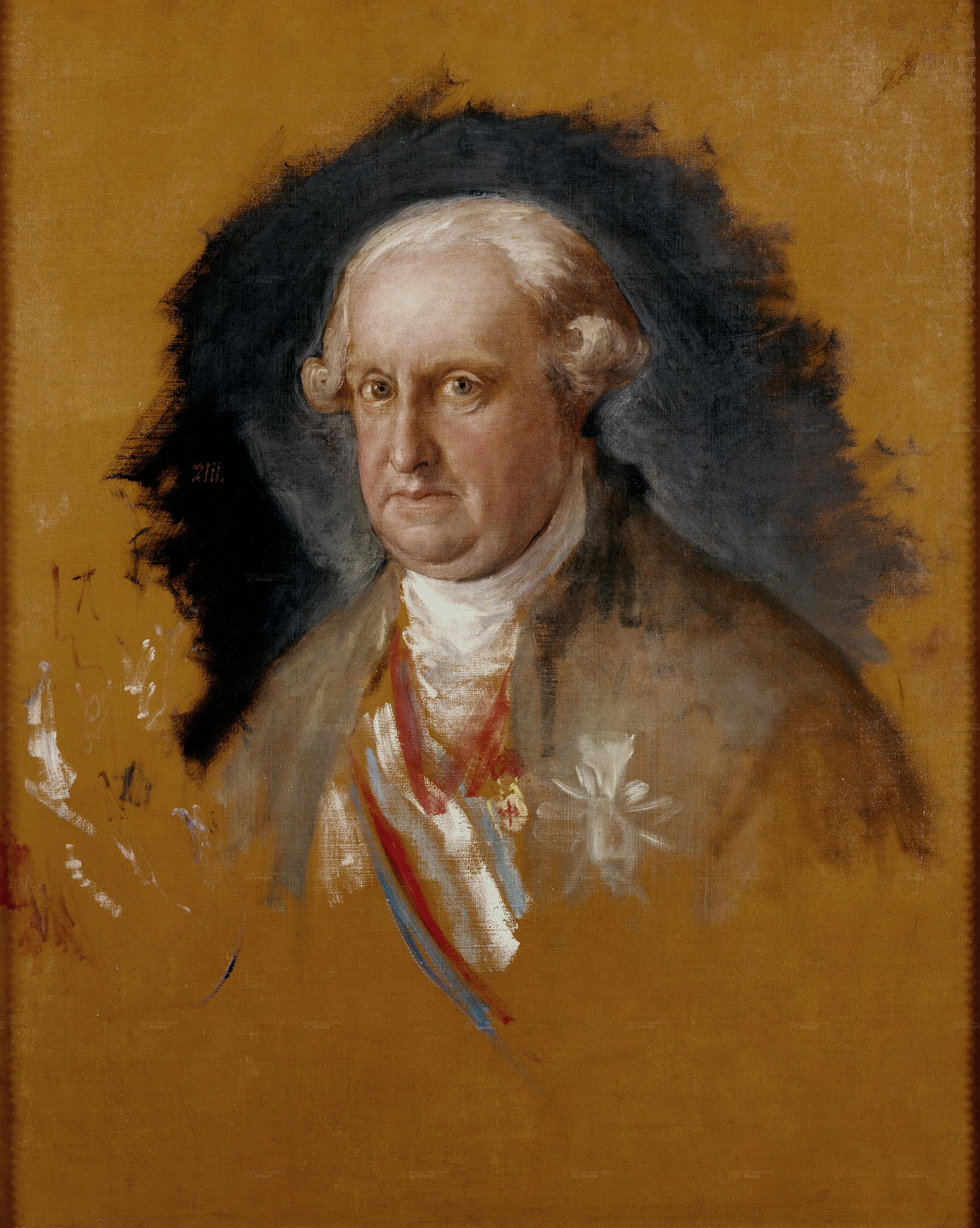
The Infante Antonio Pascual, oil on canvas. Sketch for Charles IV of Spain and His Family. Francisco Goya, 1800. Museo del Prado. He presided over the Supreme Junta of Government appointed by Ferdinand VII after leaving Madrid to meet Napoleon.

On April 10, Ferdinand VII left Madrid, expecting to meet Napoleon in Burgos. He had appointed a Supreme Junta of Government, presided over by his uncle, Infante Antonio Pascual de Borbón. He was accompanied by a large entourage led by three members of his private cabinet—Escoiquiz, the Dukes of Infantado, and San Carlos—and one government member, the Secretary of State Pedro Cevallos. They were escorted by French troops under General Savary’s command. On April 12, the entourage arrived in Burgos, where the king was triumphantly welcomed by crowds, as had happened elsewhere along the route, but Napoleon was not there as expected. They continued to Vitoria the next day, where the Emperor was also absent. A former minister of Charles IV, Mariano Luis de Urquijo, who had traveled from Bilbao, warned Ferdinand VII that, based on French press reports, Napoleon planned to end the Bourbon dynasty. The king and his advisors hesitated, but Savary’s assurances—and threats to unleash hostilities if they did not proceed to Bayonne—convinced them to continue. Upon returning to Bilbao, Urquijo wrote: "They are all blind and heading toward inevitable ruin." Others also tried unsuccessfully to dissuade them. The Junta of Government in Madrid sent a report to the king, complaining that French troops were "exhausting all the revenues and resources of our impoverished treasury, causing unbearable harassment and vexations to the people" and expressing the "Nation’s" desire, which the government had so far restrained, "to preserve its independence from any foreign authority".

Ferdinand VII wrote a letter to Napoleon, delivered personally by Savary to Bayonne, asserting that Charles IV’s abdication was free and spontaneous and pledging his loyalty. The letter concluded: "I therefore earnestly request Your Imperial and Royal Majesty to end the anguish caused by your silence and dispel, with a favorable response, the acute concerns that my loyal vassals would suffer from prolonged uncertainty." Napoleon’s response, described by Emilio La Parra López as "harsh", was delivered by Savary on April 18. It was the first time Napoleon addressed Ferdinand directly, never using the title "Majesty." He wrote: "As a neighboring Sovereign, I must ascertain what happened before recognizing this abdication... If King Charles’s abdication was spontaneous and not forced by the insurrection and mutiny in Aranjuez, I have no difficulty accepting it and recognizing Your Royal Highness as King of Spain. I wish to discuss this matter with you... I am undecided between various ideas that need clarification." The letter also referenced Ferdinand’s role in the Escorial conspiracy, reminding him of the "sacred" rights of the throne. Surprisingly to Napoleon, who had taken measures to prevent Ferdinand’s return to Madrid, Ferdinand responded with full submission, addressing the letter "My Lord and Brother" and announcing his immediate departure for Bayonne. He left Vitoria on April 19, despite a crowd’s attempts to prevent his departure due to distrust of the French. The king assured them that his trip to meet "his ally the Emperor" would have "the happiest consequences".

Meanwhile, after Ferdinand VII’s departure from Madrid, Murat pressured the Junta of Government to release Manuel Godoy, transport him to France, and thus influence the mood of the royal parents. Godoy’s release occurred on April 20, driven by the Junta’s fear of Murat’s reaction and the belief that it would benefit Ferdinand’s cause with Napoleon. Godoy was handed over to the French and arrived in Bayonne on April 26. On April 16, Murat informed the Junta that Napoleon recognized only Charles IV as king and intended to publish a proclamation stating that his abdication was coerced. The Junta responded that it would not acknowledge this until Charles IV himself confirmed it and requested secrecy. Murat then coordinated with Charles IV, who, from El Escorial, where Murat had taken him, wrote to Napoleon placing himself in his hands and to his brother Antonio, president of the Junta, retracting his abdication and confirming the Junta’s members as established by Ferdinand. On April 22, the royal parents began their journey to Bayonne.

== Abdications ==
At noon on April 20, Ferdinand VII arrived in Bayonne, having spent the night in Irún. No imperial envoy greeted him at the border as protocol required. He was taken to the intendancy building, where his brother, Infante Carlos, was already staying, and neither Ferdinand nor his entourage considered it a suitable residence for a monarch. Shortly afterward, he dined with Napoleon at the Château de Marracq, where Napoleon never addressed him as "Majesty" or even "Royal Highness." Napoleon wrote to Talleyrand about this first meeting: "He hasn’t said a single word to me; he is indifferent to everything, very materialistic, eats four times a day, and has no ideas about anything." That afternoon, General Savary visited the intendancy building to inform Ferdinand that the Emperor had "irrevocably decided that the Bourbon dynasty would not reign in Spain, and his own would take its place." The king, Infante Carlos, and their entire entourage were shocked. Secretary of State Cevallos wrote to the Madrid Junta of Government: Napoleon "does not want any Bourbon to reign... He acts with such threats and in such an imperious and unprecedented tone that it cannot be conveyed on paper."

British satirical caricature about the Bayonne Abdications titled: "Boney ['Bony'] in Bayonne Blowing a Spanish Bubble". It depicts Napoleon (Boney) blowing a bubble while bombarding Madrid. Inside the bubble are Charles IV, the "old king", whom Napoleon calls "my friend"; the "most worthy queen" María Luisa of Parma, whom Napoleon assures "has nothing to fear from me"; the "Prince of Asturias" Ferdinand, called "my friend and brother"; and Manuel Godoy, "Prince of Peace," whom Napoleon assures has his "Guardian Angel."

On April 30, ten days after Ferdinand VII, Charles IV and his wife María Luisa of Parma arrived in Bayonne. Napoleon had kept them under his protection in El Escorial, and both Murat and the new French ambassador, Count de Laforêt, had led Charles IV to believe—or he had convinced himself—that the Emperor intended to restore him to the Spanish throne. Unlike Ferdinand VII, they were greeted by an imperial envoy upon crossing the border, and upon entering Bayonne, bells rang and 101 cannon salutes were fired as per protocol. They were taken to the Government Palace, a more suitable residence than the intendancy building housing Ferdinand and his entourage. Hours after their arrival, a besamanos was held, attended by all the Grandees of Spain accompanying Ferdinand. "The different treatment Napoleon gave to Charles IV and Ferdinand VII was telling. He received the former as a king; the latter, he did not consider as such," commented Emilio La Parra López.

The next day, May 1, the royal parents dined with Napoleon, joined by Manuel Godoy, who had been freed from prison by French troops and arrived in Bayonne on April 26. During the meal, Napoleon asked Charles IV to summon his son and "require" him to return the Crown through a written, personally signed document. "It would not be appropriate for me to do so, as I am neither his father nor his King, but merely a friendly and allied Sovereign. Nevertheless, if you deem it necessary to impose greater respect on your wayward son, I am ready to accompany and assist you in this grave step, which is inevitable," the Emperor added. Charles IV immediately complied, summoning the "Prince of Asturias" and demanding his abdication document. The next day, Ferdinand delivered it, stating: "I am ready, given the circumstances in which I find myself, to renounce my crown in favor of Your Majesty." However, he set two conditions: the renunciation must occur in Madrid before the Cortes, and if Charles IV did not wish to reign or return to Spain, Ferdinand would govern as his lieutenant. In a response drafted by Napoleon, Charles IV rejected these conditions: "I am king by the right of my parents; my abdication is the result of force and violence; therefore, I have nothing to receive from you, nor can I consent to any assembly, a new foolish suggestion from the men accompanying you."

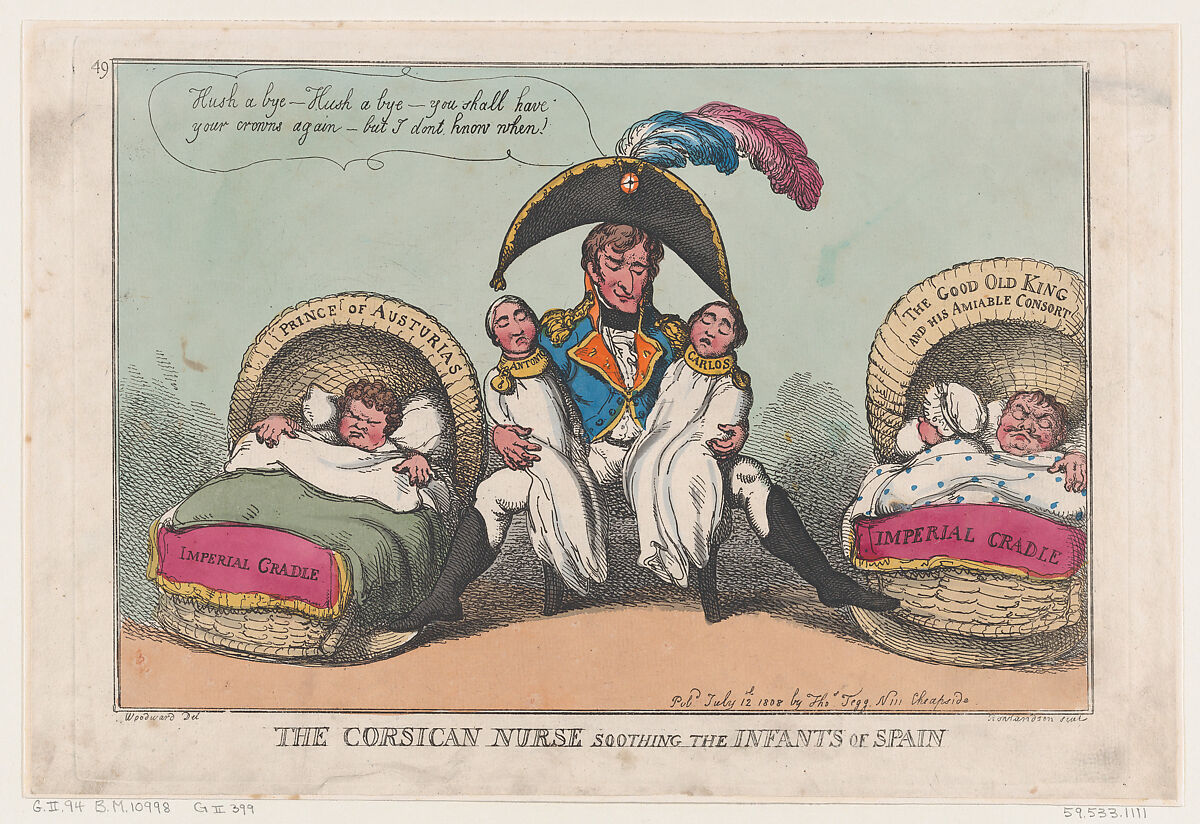
Satirical caricature by English artist George Moutard Woodward titled "The Corsican Nurse Soothing the Infants of Spain" (July 1808). The "Corsican nurse" (Napoleon) holds the infants Carlos María Isidro de Borbón and Francisco de Paula Antonio de Borbón, while in an "imperial cradle" lies the Prince of Asturias Ferdinand VII, and in another, Charles IV and his "amiable consort". Napoleon says: "Hush! Hush! You’ll get your crowns back. But I don’t know when."

On May 4, Charles IV, acting as the true King of Spain, issued a decree from Bayonne appointing "Lieutenant General of the Kingdom" and president of the Junta of Government "our beloved brother the Grand Duke of Berg [Murat], who simultaneously commands the troops of our ally, the Emperor of the French." In reality, Charles IV was acting under Napoleon’s dictation, who, two days earlier, had ordered Murat to send the rest of the Spanish royal family to Bayonne (Infante Francisco de Paula de Borbón, aged 14; Infanta María Luisa de Borbón, Queen of Etruria; and Infante Antonio Pascual de Borbón, Charles IV’s brother, whom Ferdinand VII had left in charge of the Junta of Government after leaving Madrid to meet Napoleon).

In a letter to Murat on May 2, Napoleon revealed his plans: "I am very pleased with King Charles and the Queen, who are very happy here. I am sending them to Compiègne. I am appointing the King of Naples to reign in Spain. I will give you the Kingdom of Naples or Portugal." At the time, Napoleon was unaware of the anti-French uprising in Madrid on May 2, which would spark the Spanish War of Independence—two hundred French soldiers had been killed. He learned of it on the afternoon of May 5 through a letter from Murat, reporting that the "revolt" had been crushed and over a thousand "insurgents" executed in retaliation. According to witnesses, Napoleon flew into a rage upon reading the letter and rushed to Charles IV’s quarters, saying, "See what I’ve received from Madrid; I can’t explain it."

After reading Murat’s letter, Charles IV summoned his sons Ferdinand and Carlos. According to Thierry Lentz, "the scene that followed was even more astonishing than those before it". Emilio La Parra López agrees: the scene "could not have been more painful". "There were harsh reproaches, especially from the Queen to Ferdinand; Charles IV declared himself incapable of continuing to wear the crown, Infante Carlos supported his brother Ferdinand with a heartfelt embrace that felt like a farewell, and Ferdinand remained silent throughout, greatly irritating Napoleon." The Emperor intervened, addressing Ferdinand: "This massacre can only be the work of a party you cannot disavow, and I will never recognize as King of Spain someone who has first broken the alliance that has long united it with France, ordering the murder of French soldiers." He then issued an ultimatum: "If by midnight you have not recognized your Father as your legitimate King and made it known to Madrid, you will be treated as a rebel." After Ferdinand left, Napoleon told Charles IV that if he did not wish to reign, he would "take possession of Spain" and offered him asylum in his states, provided Charles IV renounced his rights to the Spanish Crown. Immediately, Marshal Gérard Duroc, Napoleon’s aide, and Manuel Godoy, on behalf of the royal parents, began drafting a treaty by which Charles IV ceded his rights to the Spanish Crown to Napoleon with only two conditions: maintaining the territorial integrity of the monarchy and preserving Catholicism as the kingdom’s sole religion, which Napoleon accepted. The treaty also committed Napoleon to host Charles IV, his wife, and Godoy in France, paying them 30 million reales monthly for their maintenance and ceding Charles IV the Château de Chambord. The treaty, essentially a private act lacking formal diplomatic requirements, recognized the Emperor as "the only one who, given the state of affairs, [could] restore order."

I have deemed it appropriate to give my beloved vassals the ultimate proof of my paternal love. Their happiness, the tranquility, prosperity, preservation, and integrity of the dominions that divine providence had placed under my government have been, during my reign, the sole objects of my constant efforts. All measures and provisions taken since my ascension to the throne of my august ancestors have been directed toward this just end and could not have been directed otherwise. Today, in the extraordinary circumstances in which I find myself, my conscience, honor, and the good name I must leave to posterity imperiously demand that my final act of sovereignty be directed solely toward the aforementioned end, namely, the tranquility, prosperity, security, and integrity of the monarchy from whose throne I am departing, and the greater happiness of my vassals in both hemispheres.
Thus, through a signed and ratified treaty, I have ceded to my ally and dear friend the Emperor of the French all my rights over Spain and the Indies; it has been agreed that the Crown of Spain and the Indies shall always remain independent and intact, as it has been under my sovereignty, and also that our sacred religion shall not only be the dominant one in Spain but also the only one observed in all the dominions of this monarchy. You shall understand this and communicate it to the other councils, tribunals of the kingdom, heads of the provinces, both military and civil, and ecclesiastical, and to all the justices of my peoples, so that this final act of my sovereignty is known to all in my dominions of Spain and the Indies, and that you encourage and ensure the execution of the provisions of my dear friend Emperor Napoleon, aimed at preserving peace, friendship, and union between France and Spain, avoiding disorders and popular movements whose effects are always devastation, the desolation of families, and the ruin of all.
Given in Bayonne at the imperial palace called the Government on May 8, 1808. I, the King [Charles IV]. To the interim Governor of my Council of Castile.

— Gazeta de Madrid, Friday, May 20, 1808.

Before midnight on May 5, Ferdinand VII delivered to the Emperor a copy of the letter he intended to send to his father, dated the following day, renouncing the crown in his favor, "wishing that Your Majesty may enjoy it for many years." This was a touch of "dark humor" or an "act of vengeance", according to Emilio La Parra, "knowing that he [Charles IV] had already ceded [the crown] to Napoleon." Like his father, Ferdinand VII also signed a treaty with Napoleon, whereby the Emperor committed to paying the "Prince of Asturias"—the title Ferdinand would receive—a pension of 500,000 francs, plus an income of 600,000. En route to the Château de Valençay, where they would be confined, Ferdinand, his uncle Antonio, and his brother Carlos signed a proclamation in Bordeaux on May 12, urging Spaniards to remain "calm", "awaiting their happiness from the wise provisions and power of Emperor Napoleon." A French journalist in a counter-revolutionary newspaper published in London wrote: "This is a new example of a royal family debased, extinguished, and destroyed." He described Ferdinand as "foolish and imprudent". On May 18, they arrived at Valençay, where Talleyrand, the château’s owner, awaited them. Meanwhile, Napoleon had written to Murat, his lieutenant in Spain: "I am appointing the King of Naples [Joseph Bonaparte] to reign in Madrid." French historian Thierry Lentz commented: Joseph Bonaparte "was, in fact, leaving the slopes of Vesuvius for an even more capricious volcano."

== Interregnum ==
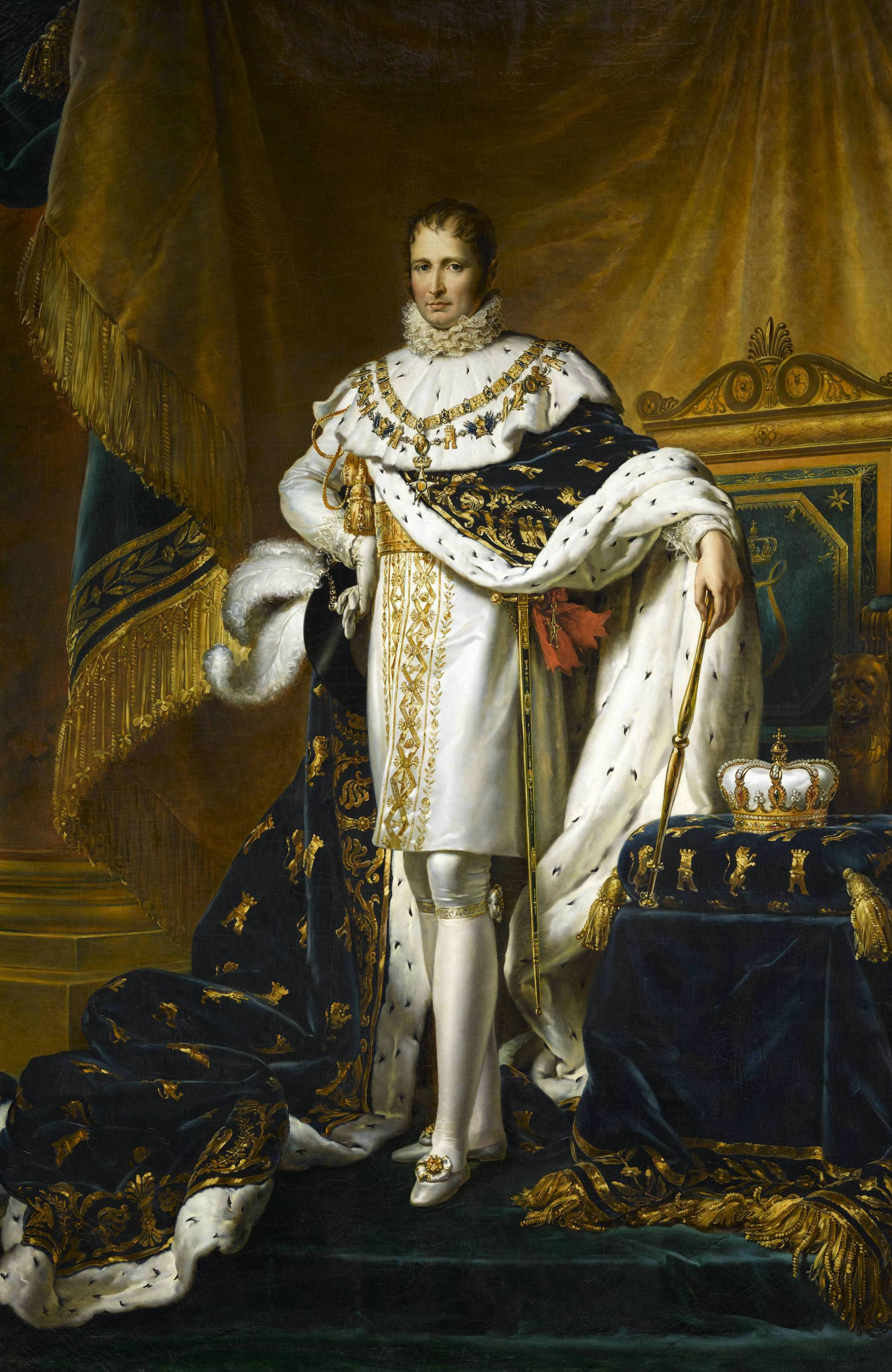
Joseph Bonaparte, Napoleon’s brother, appointed King of Spain as Joseph I after the Bayonne abdications.

On May 10, Napoleon wrote to his elder brother Joseph Bonaparte, King of Naples since 1806 by his appointment, informing him that he would transfer the Spanish Crown’s rights, which he had just received from Charles IV and Ferdinand VII:

The nation, through the Council of Castile, requests a king from me. It is to you that I designate this crown: Spain is not like the Kingdom of Naples; it is about eleven million inhabitants, more than 150 million in revenue, not counting the immense income and possessions of all the Americas. It is a crown that, moreover, establishes you in Madrid, three days from France, fully covering one of its borders. Being in Madrid, you are in France; Naples is the end of the world. I therefore wish that, immediately after receiving this letter, you leave the regency to whomever you choose, the command to Marshal Jourdan, and set out for Bayonne.

When news of the Bayonne events reached Spain in mid-May 1808, an anti-French rebellion spread across the country, while the new king, Joseph I, did not arrive in Madrid until late July. This "interregnum", according to historian Miguel Artola, was "Napoleon’s first mistake." "At this moment, when a strong government capable of maintaining order was most necessary, the supreme authority is the commander-in-chief of the French armies [Murat], a foreign power to the country, and who, moreover, is ill and does not deal with governance. The people—abandoned by their kings, who have abdicated—without the new monarch—who will not arrive until July 20—find themselves, for nearly two months, facing a strange and unexpected interregnum, a vacant throne." The increasingly frequent and anguished dispatches from the French ambassador in Madrid, Count de Laforêt, urging Napoleon to expedite the process, had no effect. "When Joseph arrives, it will be too late. The abandoned nation has had time to decide its future for itself, and its response is war," Artola concludes.

On May 25, Napoleon issued a proclamation to the Spanish people, stating he would not reign in Spain, reaffirming the call for an assembly of notables in Bayonne, and confirming Murat’s position.

...Spaniards: after a long agony, your nation was about to perish. I have seen your ills and will remedy them... Your princes have ceded all their rights to the Crown of Spain to me; I do not wish to reign in your provinces... and I will make you enjoy the benefits of reform without experiencing disruptions, disorders, or convulsions.
Spaniards: I have convened a general assembly of the deputations, provinces, and cities. I myself wish to know your desires and needs... ensuring at the same time a Constitution that reconciles the holy and salutary authority of the Sovereign with the freedoms and privileges of the people.
Spaniards: remember what your ancestors were, and see what you have become. The fault is not yours but of the poor government that ruled you. I want my memory to reach your latest descendants, and for them to exclaim: he is the regenerator of our homeland.

— Bayonne, May 25, 1808.

On June 4, the Emperor issued a decree in Bayonne appointing his brother Joseph as King of Spain. The Bayonne Assembly, convened by Napoleon with 91 of the 150 intended notables in attendance, debated the draft Constitution he prepared and, with minor amendments, approved the Bayonne Statute between June 15 and 30, 1808. King Joseph swore the oath on July 7 and entered Spain on July 9. He arrived in Madrid on July 20 but stayed only eleven days, forced to leave due to the victory of the "patriots", defenders of Ferdinand VII’s rights, in the Battle of Bailén. Days later, on August 11, the Council of Castile invalidated the Bayonne abdications, and on August 24, Ferdinand VII was proclaimed king in absentia in Madrid. Subsequently, on January 14, 1809, the United Kingdom recognized Ferdinand VII as King of Spain in a treaty.

== Bibliography ==
- Artola, Miguel; Marañón, Gregorio (1976) [1953]. Los afrancesados [The Afrancesados] (in Spanish). Madrid: Turner. ISBN 84-85137-39-6.
- Berga Marroquín, Armando (January 2008). "Las abdicaciones de Bayona" [The Bayonne Abdications]. Historia 16 (in Spanish) (381).
- De Francisco Olmos, José María (2001). "Conflictos bélicos y circulación de moneda extranjera en España 1808-1836: la documentación de la inestabilidad" [Military Conflicts and Circulation of Foreign Currency in Spain 1808–1836: Documentation of Instability] (PDF). Revista General de Información y Documentación (in Spanish). 11 (1): 109–131. ISSN 1132-1873.
- La Parra López, Emilio (2018). Fernando VII. Un rey deseado y detestado [Ferdinand VII: A Desired and Detested King] (in Spanish). XXX Premio Comillas de Historia, Biografía y Memorias. Barcelona: Tusquets. ISBN 978-84-9066-512-1.
- Lentz, Thierry (2016). Joseph Bonaparte (in French). Paris: Perrin. ISBN 978-2-262-04873-0.
- Mínguez Cornelles, Víctor (2011). "Un Bonaparte en el trono de las Españas y de las Indias. Iconografía de José Napoleón I" [A Bonaparte on the Throne of Spain and the Indies: Iconography of Joseph Napoleon I] (PDF). Ars Longa. Cuadernos de Arte (in Spanish) (20): 109–124.
- Queipo de Llano Ruiz de Saravía, José María (1838). Historia del levantamiento, Guerra y Revolución de España [History of the Uprising, War, and Revolution in Spain] (in Spanish). Vol. 1. Vol. 2 (1836), Vol. 3 (1838).
- Sánchez Mantero, Rafael (2003). "Misión imposible. José Bonaparte, en España" [Impossible Mission: Joseph Bonaparte in Spain]. La Aventura de la Historia (in Spanish) (56): 44–50.
