= Juan Escoiquiz =

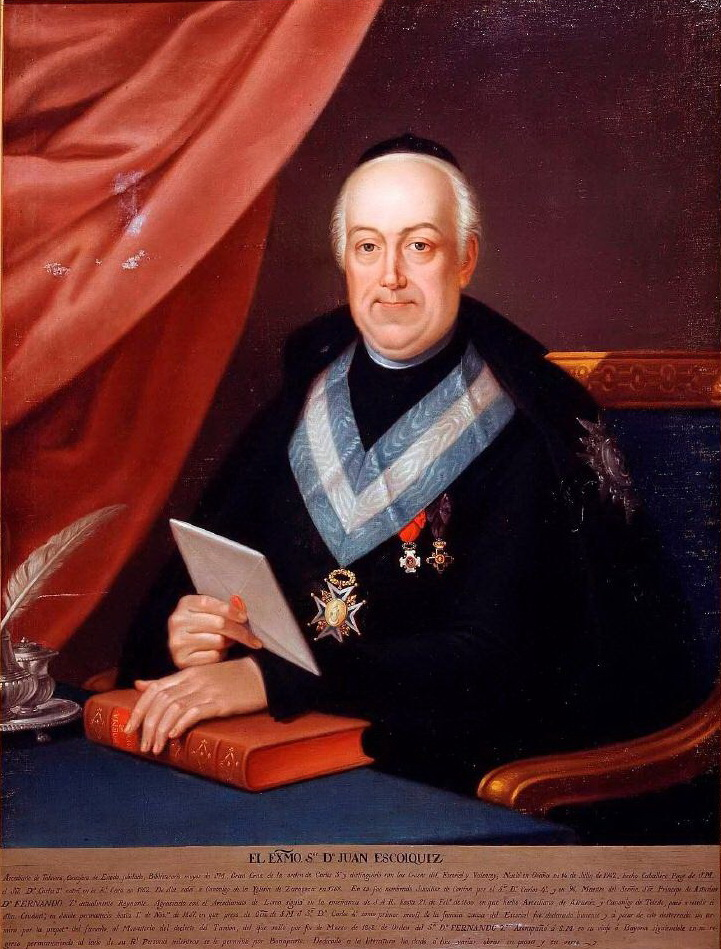
Portrait of Juan Escoiquiz by José de Madrazo

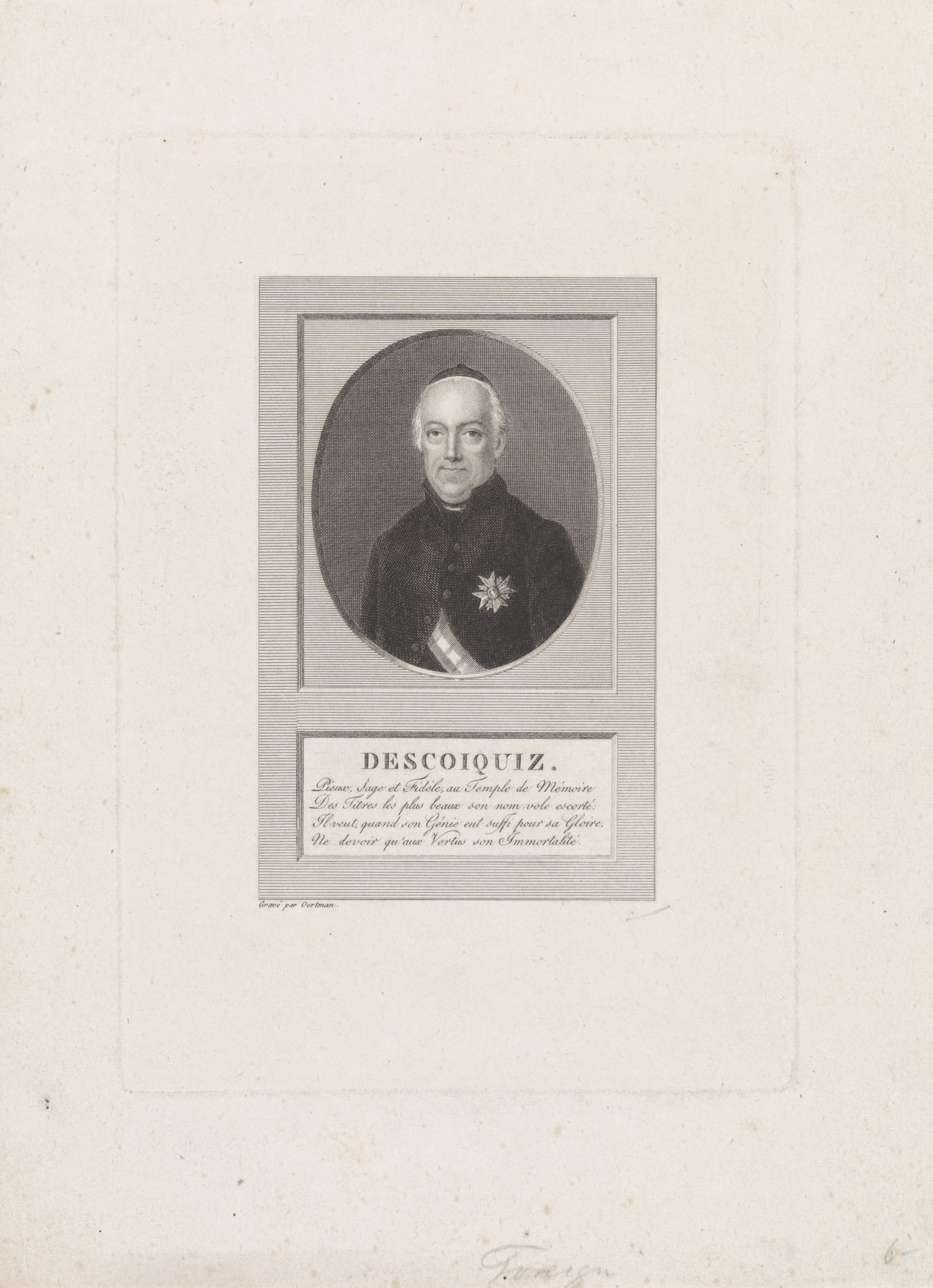
Portrait of Juan Escoiquiz by Joachim Jan Oortman

Juan Escoiquiz Morata (1762 – 27 November 1820) was a Spanish ecclesiastic, politician and writer.

== Early life ==
Escoiquiz was born in Ocaña in 1762. His father was a general officer and he began life as a page in the court of King Charles III. He entered the church and was provided for by a prebend at Zaragoza. In his memoirs, Manuel de Godoy asserts that Escoiquiz sought to gain his favor by flattery. There is every reason to believe that this is an accurate statement of the case.

== Life at court ==
Escoiquiz was selected to be the tutor of the heir-apparent, Ferdinand, afterwards King Ferdinand VII and said when appointed that he would be happy if his tutoring "leads to his being the most humane of Princes".

He began to hope that he might play the part of those court ecclesiastics who had often had an active share in the government of Spain. He was seen to "exercise a great power over the royal pupil" and tried to encourage Ferdinand to have Godoy removed from his post. As Ferdinand grew up, he became the center of a court opposition to Godoy and to his policy of alliance with France. Escoiquiz was the brains of the intrigue, and he wrote essays for Ferdinand to publish under his own name, so that he would seem wise and statesmanlike. Escoiquiz also persuaded Ferdinand to seek a seat in cabinet, but this was denied by his father Charles IV who felt his son should not hold an office that he had been denied at the same age. Escoiquiz's activity was discovered and he was dismissed from court, being made archdeacon of Alcaraz in the diocese of Toledo instead. This measure was ineffective since Escoiquiz continued to be in constant communication with the prince; Toledo is close to Madrid, correspondence was easily maintained, and Escoiquiz continued to visit the royal palace.

When Ferdinand later found out that Godoy had advised against his marriage to Princess Maria Antonia of Naples in October 1802, his dislike increased even further, believing that Godoy did not want the question of succession to be settled in his favour. When his parents showered Godoy with honours, including the title of Highness, Ferdinand saw it as a personal insult. In his Mémoires, Godoy said that Ferdinand was "doomed at an early age to feel no affection for anyone", but that Escoiquiz had "seized upon the moral faculties of his pupil like an unclean insect which sticks to the bud of a rose" and made Ferdinand suspicious and distrusting.

He had a large share in the El Escorial Conspiracy which was detected on 28 October 1807. He was imprisoned and sent for trial with other conspirators. But as they had appealed to Napoleon, who did not want his name to be mentioned, the government had to allow the matter to be quieted, and the prisoners were acquitted. After the Tumult of Aranjuez on 17 March 1808, in which he had a share, he became one of the most trusted advisers of Ferdinand. The new king's decision to go to meet Napoleon at Bayonne was largely inspired by him. When the Spanish royal family was imprisoned by Napoleon, Escoiquiz remained with Ferdinand at Valençay.

When Ferdinand was released in 1814, he came back to Madrid in the hope that his ambition would now be satisfied, but the king was tired of him, and was moreover resolved never to be subjected by any favorite. After a very brief period of office in 1815, he was sent as a prisoner to Murcia. Though he was afterwards recalled, he was again exiled to Ronda, where he died on 27 November 1820.

== Works ==
In 1797, he published a translation of Young's Night Thoughts, which does not of itself show that he was well acquainted with English, for the version may have been made with the help of the French. In 1798, he published an epic on the conquest of Mexico. Escoiquiz was in fact a busy and pushing member of the literary clique which looked up to Godoy as its patron.

Around 1812, (Note: The 1911 Encyclopaedia Britannica states it was published in 1813, while Angelica Duran states it was published in 1812.) Escoiquiz published at Bourges a translation of John Milton's Paradise Lost. It was in verse and softened or omitted the anti-Catholic passages to make it more acceptable to Spanish Catholics. Escoiquiz himself noted in the book's translator's prologue that he leaves out parts which are "ridiculous and indecent, contrary to the rites and practices of the Catholic Church, suitable to the religious sect into which Milton had been born, but which far from increasing the work's merit indeed disfigure it".

In 1814, Escoiquiz published at Madrid his Idea Sencilla de las razones que motivaron el viage del Rey Fernando VII a Bayona ("Honest representation of the causes which inspired the journey of King Ferdinand VII to Bayonne"). The book contains an account of an interview with Napoleon. According to the Encyclopædia Britannica, Escoiquiz was "far too firmly convinced of his ingenuity and merits to conceal the delusions and follies of himself and his associates", and displayed his own "vanity, frivolity and futile cleverness with much unconscious humour, but... with some literary dexterity."

== Orders and jobs ==
=== Orders ===
- Knight Grand Cross of the Order of Charles III.
- Cross of Distinction of El Escorial.
- Cross of Distinction of Valençay.

=== Jobs ===
- Councilor of State.
- Councillor of State.
- Archdeacon of Talavera.
- Dignity of the cathedral of Toledo.
- Canon of the cathedral of Zaragoza.
- Chief Librarian of His Majesty.
