= Northern Mariana citizenship and nationality =

The Marianas archipelago of the Northern Pacific contains fourteen islands located between Japan and New Guinea on a north–south axis and Hawaii and the Philippines on an east–west axis. Inhabitants were Spanish nationals from the 16th century until the Spanish–American War of 1898. As Guam became a territory of the United States the Northern Marianas were sold to Germany in 1899. The Northern Mariana Islands were a German protectorate until 1919, when they became part of the South Seas Mandate, administered by Japan. At the close of World War II, the Marianas became part of the Trust Territory of the Pacific Islands. In 1975, the Commonwealth of the Northern Mariana Islands became a self-governing territory. In 1986, the Marianas came under the sovereignty of the United States when the trusteeship ended and US nationality and citizenship was conferred on the inhabitants of the territory.

Nationality is the legal means in which inhabitants acquire formal membership in a nation without regard to its governance type. In addition to being United States nationals, people born in the Northern Mariana Islands are both citizens of the United States and citizens of the Commonwealth of the Northern Mariana Islands. Citizenship is the relationship between the government and the governed, the rights and obligations that each owes the other, once one has become a member of a nation. Though the Constitution of the United States recognizes both national and state citizenship as a means of accessing rights, (Note: The Constitution of the United States establishes that rights flow from both national and state citizenship, as does the Covenant to Establish a Commonwealth of the Northern Mariana Islands in Political Union with the United States of America (1975) for Northern Mariana Islanders. Because, federal law, including treaties, overrides other laws within its territorial limits only if those laws are incompatible with national statutes, states historically have had the ability to grant or withhold rights for various categories of persons residing in their jurisdiction without abridging the Equal Protection Clause. Until the 1960s, differences in legislation among various jurisdictions gave people extremely different civil rights depending upon where they resided.) the Northern Mariana Islands' unique history allowed it to regulate its own immigration policies until 2009, when its nationality and immigration laws became federalized.

== History of nationality in the Mariana Islands ==
=== Spanish period (1521–1898) ===
Portuguese navigator Ferdinand Magellan, during his fleet's circumnavigation of the globe for Charles I, King of Spain, sighted Guam and Rota on March 6, 1521, naming the islands Los Ladrones (The Thieves). In 1565, Miguel López de Legazpi officially claimed the Ladrones for Spain. From that date the Laws of the Indies were implemented in the islands and the inhabitants became subjects of the Spanish crown, under the authority of the Viceroyalty of New Spain, in Mexico. Administration on behalf of the king was granted to the Council of the Indies, which served as the authority on commercial, ecclesiastical, financial, legal and military matters in the Spanish possessions. No European settlement occurred at that time and the island was only visited from time to time by Dutch, English and Spanish explorers and pirates. It was not until 1668, when Mariana of Austria Queen Regent of Spain authorized missionary Diego Luis de San Vitores to establish a mission, that Spanish colonization began and the islands were renamed in her honor. In 1681, a royal decree granted the indigenous population, the Chamorro people, equal status with other Spanish subjects in its possessions. In general, this meant that criollos, persons with Spanish heritage born in the colonies, had fewer rights than peninsulares, those born in Spain, but more rights than indigenous people or slaves.

In 1808 when Charles IV of Spain was dethroned by an attempted coup d'état during the Peninsular War with France, the government-in-exile promulgated Spain's first constitution. The 1812 Constitution of Cádiz limited the power of the king and granted freedoms and rights to the Spanish people. Under its terms, the Spanish nation included all free men and their children born and settled in the territories of the Spanish empire. Freedmen from Africa and foreigners residing within Spanish territory were permitted to naturalize as Spanish. In 1814 upon returning to Spain from captivity in France, Ferdinand VII abrogated the constitution and reinstated an absolute monarchy, leading to independence wars throughout Spanish America. Revolution in 1820 reinstated the Constitution of Cádiz, but the return to power of Ferdinand in 1823, saw it suspended again. In 1824 the control of the Mariana Islands was moved from Mexico to the Captaincy General of the Philippines and in 1828 a new organic law was devised for the territory.

Instability in the Spanish empire continued until 1874 with periods of conflict followed by calm only to erupt into insurrection again. The Constitution of Cádiz was reinstated in 1836 and revoked a year later. Two Carlist Wars followed by the 1868 Revolution, led to a democratic experiment and the drafting of a new constitution in 1869. The constitution called for significant colonial reforms, but before they could be acted upon the Third Carlist War and subsequent restoration of the monarchy ended its authority. A new constitution was adopted in 1876, and in 1889 the first Spanish Civil Code was adopted. The Code was extended to Cuba, Puerto Rico, and the Captaincy General of the Philippines, establishing that nationality was acquired either from birth in Spanish territory or by descent from a Spanish national. Legitimate children could derive nationality from a father, but only illegitimate children could derive Spanish nationality from a mother, as a married woman was required to take the nationality of her husband. It also contained provisions for foreigners to naturalize.

In 1895, the Cuban War of Independence served as catalyst for the Spanish–American War. Battles in both the Caribbean and Pacific resulted in destruction of the Spanish fleet and loss of its overseas possessions. On June 21, 1898, the Spanish governor Juan Marina surrendered Guam to the US forces and under the terms of the Treaty of Paris signed in December, Spain relinquished sovereignty over Cuba and ceded Guam, the Philippines, and Puerto Rico to the United States. Guam was separated from the rest of the Mariana Islands, which were sold to Germany along with the Caroline Islands and Palau in 1899.

=== German colonial period (1899–1920) ===
Upon acquiring the Marianas in 1899, German administrators found them to be economically unproductive and a financial burden, eventually moving the administrative headquarters from Saipan to Yap. Under the terms of the Colonial Act of 1888, German colonies were not part of the federal union, but they were also not considered foreign. Thus, laws that were extended to the colonies sometimes treated residents as nationals and other times as foreigners. Native subjects in the colonies were not considered to be German, but were allowed to naturalize. Naturalization required ten years residence in the territory and proof of self-employment. It was automatically bestowed upon all members of a family, meaning children and wives derived the nationality of the husband. The Nationality Law of 1913 changed the basis for acquiring German nationality from domicile to patrilineality, but did not alter derivative nationality. At the outbreak of World War I, Japan joined the Allies and began an offensive to capture the German possessions in the Pacific. By October 1914, Japanese troops were in possession of Saipan. During their occupation maintained the German administrative system. At the end of the war, under terms of the Treaty of Versailles, Japan was granted the South Seas Mandate in 1919, which included the Caroline, Mariana, Marshall, and Palau islands. Terms of the mandate specified that islanders were not to be militarized and that social and economic development in the territory was to be of benefit to the local inhabitants.

=== Mandate, trustee period (1920–1978) ===
Between 1921 and 1922, administration for the Japanese Pacific colonies passed from the navy to civil authorities of the South Seas Bureau (Japanese: Nan'yō Chō). The native inhabitants of the islands were not equal to Japanese imperial subjects and were accorded different status. They were considered aliens, though if they met requirements of the 1899 Nationality Law, islanders could naturalize. Despite the League of Nations' mandate for Japan to treat the colonies as integral parts of the nation, Japan chose not to extend the constitution to their Pacific colonies. Japan surrendered its Pacific possessions at the end of World War II and the United States proposed retaining control over the former Japanese-mandated islands for security purposes. Mandates were replaced by Trust Territories to be overseen by a Trusteeship Council of the United Nations. In 1947, a trust agreement was drawn between the United Nations and the United States to establish the Trust Territory of the Pacific Islands.

Upon taking control of the region in July 1947, the United States Navy decreed the removal of Japanese immigrants and began the process of repatriating Japanese civilians. The Trust Territory was managed by the navy until 1951, at which time administration was passed to the United States Department of the Interior. The following year, the Code of the Trust Territory was introduced. It defined nationals as persons born in the territory prior to December 22, 1952, who had not acquired other nationality, or those born after that date in the territory. It also confirmed that children born abroad to parents who were nationals of the Trust Territory derived their parents' nationality until the age of twenty-one. Foreigners over the age of eighteen were allowed to naturalize in the Trust Territory. The Code, as amended in 1966 and 1973 authorized the Trust Territory to control immigration and granted authority to naturalize or denaturalize persons in the territory. Trust Territories nationals were not considered to be US nationals but were allowed to naturalize as would any other foreigner in the United States.

From 1969, the United States and representatives of the Trust Territory began negotiations to develop systems to terminate the trusteeship and provide pathways to independence. Initially talks for the Marianas involved reuniting with Guam, but the proposal was rejected by Guamanian voters in 1969. Because of the diversity of the districts of the territory, it was divided into four areas — Federated States of Micronesia, the Marshall Islands, the Northern Mariana Islands, and Palau — as it was deemed that a single set of documents would not adequately serve the political needs for the region. In 1975, the Northern Marianas chose independence from the Trust Territory; the Covenant to Establish a Commonwealth of the Northern Mariana Islands in Political Union with the United States of America (Covenant) was ratified by plebiscite of the voters in June. President Gerald Ford signed the congressional resolution into law in 1976 and the Northern Marianas left the Trust Territory in 1978. The Covenant is unique in that it established limitations on federal authority as it applies to the Commonwealth of the Northern Mariana Islands. Federal legislation that is applicable to the Commonwealth must specify that it is applicable in the Commonwealth and cannot be extended or implemented in the Northern Marianas without their prior consent.

=== United States period (1978–present) ===
==== Establishing nationality for the Northern Mariana Islands (1978–2009) ====
After the Northern Mariana Islands left the Trust Territories, negotiations continued with the remaining districts of the territory. A constitution for Micronesia was drafted and in 1978 voters in Kusaie, Ponape, Truk, and Yap ratified the document to form the Federated States of Micronesia, while voters in the Marshall Islands and Palau rejected the constitution. They drafted separate constitutions and gained independent governance. In 1980 a Compact of Free Association was drafted and signed by the United States and Micronesia in 1982. It was signed by the Marshall Islands in 1983 and plebiscites observed by the UN approved the compacts that same year. After approval of the compacts by the US Congress, President Ronald Reagan announced in 1986 that the trusteeship was no longer applicable in the Federated States of Micronesia, the Marshall Islands, nor the Northern Marianas. Though the United Nations Security Council's Resolution 683, which terminated the trusteeship was not passed until 1990, Reagan's pronouncement extended US sovereignty over the Northern Marianas in 1986, granting the inhabitants US nationality. (Note: The effective date of full implementation of the Covenant was to coincide with the date of termination of the Trusteeship Agreement.) Persons born in the Northern Mariana Islands after the effective date, November 3, 1986, would obtain US nationality at birth, as would foundlings, and children born abroad to parents who were nationals of the Commonwealth of the Northern Mariana Islands.

Under the terms of the Covenant, the US Immigration and Nationality Act of 1965, as amended, had limited applicability in the Northern Marianas. Provisions regarding loss of nationality applied, as did derivative nationality, and § 201(b), which rendered immigration quotas inapplicable for immediate relatives of a U.S. citizen of the Northern Marianas, whose familial status and legal permanent residency in the territory was certified by the government of the Commonwealth. The remainder of the US Nationality Act did not apply and the Commonwealth was given the authority to naturalize applicants after the effective date. The authority granted the Trust Territories to control its immigration, issue entry and exit documents, business and resident permits, continued in the Commonwealth. The Commonwealth legislature used its authority to create laws for non-immigrant worker visas of an indefinite period, stimulating the economy through the guest worker program and offered residency permits to foreign investors or retirees who invested specific amounts in business development or real estate. After decades of criticism by labor groups regarding labor abuses in the Commonwealth and difficulty in assessing security risks, the US Congress passed an omnibus bill, the Consolidated Natural Resources Act of 2008, which contained provisions for a transition for immigration concerns to fully come under US control in 2009.

==== Establishing citizenship for the Northern Mariana Islands (1948–1986) ====
In 1948, the US Congress passed resolutions to assume legislative power over the Territory until such time as a Territorial legislature was established. The proposed legislature was to be elected by citizens who were eighteen years or older. The 1952 Code of the Trust Territory conferred citizenship upon each national of the Trust Territory of the Pacific Islands. That year, a Territorial Advisory Council was created to assist administrators in developing legislation for the territory. From the 1950s, the Territory had been divided into seven districts and in 1969 was fixed at six – The Marianas, the Marshall Islands, Palau, Ponape, Truk, and Yap. These were administered from Hawaii until 1954 and then from Guam until 1962, when the administrative headquarters moved to Saipan. That year a District Legislature was established for the Mariana Islands, and voters who were residents participated in electing officials.

Though an organic law for the Territory had been introduced repeatedly from 1949, no bill was successful in the US Congress. From 1962, in a series of consultations with representatives of the various districts, a charter to establish the Congress of Micronesia was drafted. It called for a bicameral legislature with two delegates for each district represented in the House of Delegates and proportional representation of delegates in the General Assembly. Secretary of Interior Order No. 2882 of 1964 established the provisions for the Congress of Micronesia and fixed the voting age and residency requirements for voters. The Secretarial Order authorized the Territorial Congress to create additional qualifications so long as they did not impose electoral discrimination based upon traditional caste, class, or status designations. Qualified candidates were defined as citizens of at least twenty-five years old, who had been citizens for five years and residents of their district for at least one year. In 1965, the Congress of Micronesia was convened.

The UN Trust Agreement required the United States to move the islands toward self-governance and from the 1960s, the Congress of Micronesia appointed a committee in 1967 to whether the territory should become a state associated with the United States or seek full independence. The Northern Mariana islands chose to become a Commonwealth in free association with the United States in 1975. The Covenant was ratified by plebiscite of the voters and work began to draft a constitution. Terms establishing in the Covenant provided that US citizenship would be conferred upon the nationals of the Northern Marianas, upon the dissolution of the Trust Territories. The constitution was approved by 93% of the voters in 1977 and the Marianas left the Trust Territories the following year.

The 1977 Constitution provided for the Northern Marianas to have non-voting representation in the US Congress, and contained two provisions which would not be allowed for a state in the United States. The first provision was that land cannot be held in the territory by anyone who is not descended from a citizen of the Trust Territory before it was dissolved and who has at least one grandparent who was a fully indigenous Chamorro, Caroline Islander, or Chamorro-Caroline Islander person. The second provision allows Rota and Tinian Islanders to have equal representation in the Senate despite Reynolds v. Sims (377 U.S. 533, 1964) determination that unequal representation in the domestic legislature is unconstitutional, as apportionment ignoring the population dilutes the power of the vote.

In 1986, when the Trust Territory was dissolved, US citizenship was conferred upon citizens of the former Trust Territory, who were born in the Northern Marianas and living within them or US territory on the effective date. It extended US citizenship to Trust Territory citizens who had continuously domiciled for five years in the Northern Marianas and who were registered to vote prior to January 1, 1975, unless they were not of legal majority and those domiciled in the Northern Marianas prior to January 1, 1974. Those citizens who did not want to obtain US citizenship were allowed within 6 months of reaching their majority to declare under oath that they chose to be only a US national.

=== Current system ===
==== Nationality acquisition and federal citizenship ====
By virtue of the various laws passed concerning nationality and citizenship in the Commonwealth of the Northern Mariana Islands, islanders acquire nationality and federal citizenship by various means. These include by birth in the Northern Mariana Islands after 1986, those who were previously citizens of the Trust Territories of the Pacific Islands and were domiciled in the Northern Mariana Islands in 1986, and persons born abroad to parents from the Northern Mariana Islands. Likewise, federal citizenship has been acquired through the Covenant of the Northern Mariana Islands and its various amendments through time. Not all federal laws are applicable in the Commonwealth, including minimum wage standards, customs regulations, and many fishing regulations, for example. Despite possessing federal citizenship, residents of the Northern Marianas have no voting representation in the US Congress, are unable to vote in the Electoral College, and do not have full protection under the US Constitution, unless they come to reside in a U.S. state. They are allowed to send a non-voting delegate to the US House of Representatives. Likewise, US citizens who live in the Northern Mariana Islands lose the right to vote in federal elections, as the Uniformed and Overseas Citizens Absentee Voting Act applies only to citizens who live outside the jurisdiction of the United States. Though all residents of the Commonwealth pay federal taxes in a required mirroring scheme implemented by the Internal Revenue Service, there is less federal assistance available to island citizens through programs like Temporary Assistance for Needy Families, Medicaid, and Supplemental Security Income.

==== Domestic citizenship ====
At the domestic level the Northern Marianas are governed by a republican government with executive, judicial and legislative branches. Their constitution provides a bill of rights and universal suffrage has existed since the commonwealth was established. In the first election cycle after approval of the constitution (1977), two women were elected to the insular legislature.

== See also ==
- Demographics of the Northern Mariana Islands
