= Demographics of the Northern Mariana Islands =

The demographics of the Northern Mariana Islands encompass the population characteristics of the Northern Mariana Islands, including population size and age structure, births and deaths, ethnic composition, languages, and religion. The population declined substantially between the 2000 and 2020 censuses. In a 2011 population estimate, most residents were aged 15–64, about a quarter were under 15, and only a small proportion were aged 65 or older.

According to the 2020 United States census, the largest racial groups were Asian people, at 46.3% of the population, and Pacific Islanders, at 43.2%; 7% identified with two or more races. Philippine languages form the largest reported language group, while Chamorro, English, and Refaluwasch are official languages. According to the Pew Research Center, Roman Catholicism was the largest religious affiliation in 2010, followed by Protestantism and Buddhism.

== Population ==
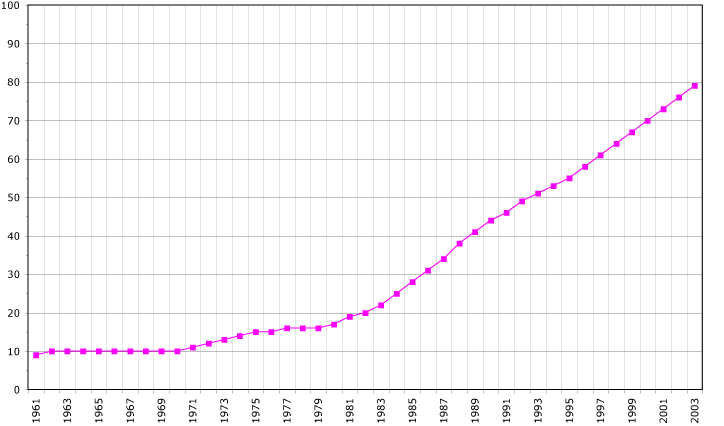
Demographics of the Northern Mariana Islands, Data of FAO, year 2005; Number of inhabitants in thousands.

=== Structure of the population ===
Population Estimates by Sex and Age Group (01.VII.2011):

Age group	Male	Female	Total	%
Total	22 153	23 897	46 050	100
0–4	2 495	2 357	4 852	10.54
5–9	1 883	1 739	3 622	7.87
10–14	1 971	1 529	3 500	7.60
15–19	2 121	1 681	3 802	8.26
20–24	1 607	1 791	3 398	7.38
25–29	1 050	2 781	3 831	8.32
30–34	1 008	2 688	3 696	8.03
35–39	1 550	1 661	3 211	6.97
40–44	1 858	1 726	3 584	7.78
45–49	1 967	1 771	3 738	8.12
50–54	1 824	1 617	3 441	7.47
55–59	1 260	1 010	2 270	4.93
60–64	769	671	1 440	3.13
65-69	366	428	794	1.72
70-74	248	168	416	0.90
75-79	101	138	239	0.52
80-84	54	93	147	0.32
85-89	17	36	53	0.12
90-94	3	11	14	0.03
95-99	1	0	1	<0.01
100+	0	1	1	<0.01
Age group	Male	Female	Total	Percent
0–14	6 349	5 625	11 974	26.00
15–64	15 014	17 397	32 411	70.38
65+	790	875	1 665	3.62

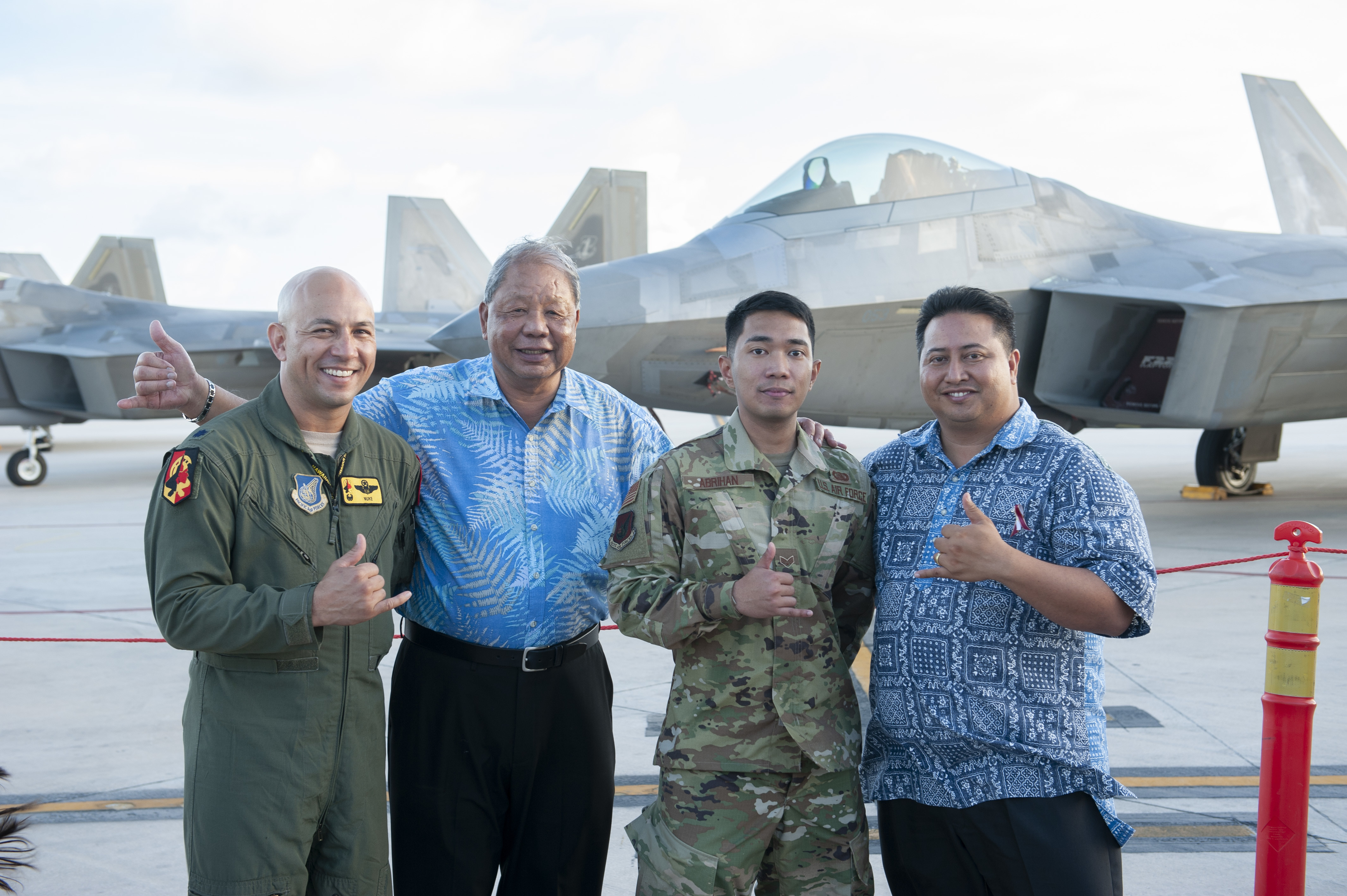
David Apatang stands with Airmen visiting the Northern Marianas

Demographic features of the population of the Northern Mariana Islands include population density, ethnicity, education level, health of the populace, economic status, religious affiliations and other aspects.

== Births and deaths ==
Population from census data, other data from CDC Births/Deaths reports.

Year	Population	Live births	Deaths	Natural increase	Crude birth rate (per 1000)	Crude death rate (per 1000)	Natural Change (per 1000)	Total Fertility Rate
1998		1,462	162	1,300	21.9	2.4	19.5	1.79
1999		1,381	162	1,219	20.0	2.3	17.7	1.68
2000	69,221	1,431	136	1,295	19.9	1.9	18.0	1.68
2001		1,449	148	1,301	19.4	2.1	17.3	1.65
2002		1,290	161	1,129	17.4	2.2	15.2	1.27
2003		1,349	142	1,207	17.7	1.9	15.8	1.29
2004		1,355	164	1,191	17.3	2.1	15.2	1.23
2005		1,335	186	1,149	16.6	2.3	14.3	1.16
2006		1,422	170	1,252	17.2	2.1	15.1	1.21
2007		1,387	137	1,250	16.4	1.6	14.8	1.13
2008		1,265	178	1,087	22.9	3.2	19.7	2.30
2009		1,109	203	906	21.5	3.9	17.6	2.27
2010	53,883	1,072	174	898	20.0	3.3	16.7	2.19
2011		1,033	165	868	19.8	3.2	16.6	2.17
2012		853	163	690	16.6	3.2	13.4	1.83
2013		686	185	501	13.4	3.6	9.8	1.58
2014		517	202	315	10.0	3.9	6.1	1.58
2015		416	223	193	8.2	4.3	3.9	1.08
2016		427	220	207	7.9	4.2	3.7	1.50
2017		363	232	131	6.9	4.4	2.5	1.33
2018		566	221	345	10.9	4.3	6.6	2.10
2019		686	209	477	13.3	4.0	9.3	2.64
2020	47,329	628	219	409	12.1	4.2	7.9	2.41
2021		570			11.0			2.20
2022		467			9.1			1.73
2023		579			11.3			2.13
2024		557			10.9			2.06

== Ethnic groups ==
Commonwealth of the Northern Mariana Islands – Racial and ethnic composition
Race / Ethnicity (NH = Non-Hispanic)	% 2020	Pop 2020
White alone (NH)	2.1%	985
Black alone (NH)	0.1%	63
American Indian alone (NH)	0%	10
Asian alone (NH)	46.3%	21,915
Pacific Islander alone (NH)	43.2%	20,448
Other race alone (NH)	0%	21
Multiracial (NH)	7%	3,333
Hispanic/Latino (any race)	1.2%	554

- Asian 50% (includes Filipino 35.3%, Chinese 6.8%, Korean 4.2%, and other Asian 3.7%)
- Native Hawaiian or other Pacific Islander 34.9% (includes Chamorro 23.9%, Carolinian people 4.6%, and other Native Hawaiian or Pacific Islander 6.4%),
- Other 2.5%, two or more ethnicities or races 12.7% (2010 est.)

== Languages ==
- Philippine languages 32.8%
- Chamorro (official) 24.1%
- English (official) 17%
- Other Pacific island languages (Refaluwasch, official) 10.1%
- Chinese 6.8%
- Other Asian languages 7.3%
- Other 1.9%

== Religion ==
According to the Pew Research Center, 2010:

- Roman Catholic 64.1%
- Protestants 16%
- Buddhists 10.6%
- Folk religions 5.3%
- Other Christians 1.2%
- Other religions 1.1%
- Unaffiliated 1.0%
- Muslim 0.7%
- Eastern Orthodox <1%
- Hindu <1%
- Jews <1%

== See also ==
- Northern Mariana citizenship and nationality
