= Castle of Marracq =

Castle in Pyrénées-Atlantiques, France

- Château de Marracq
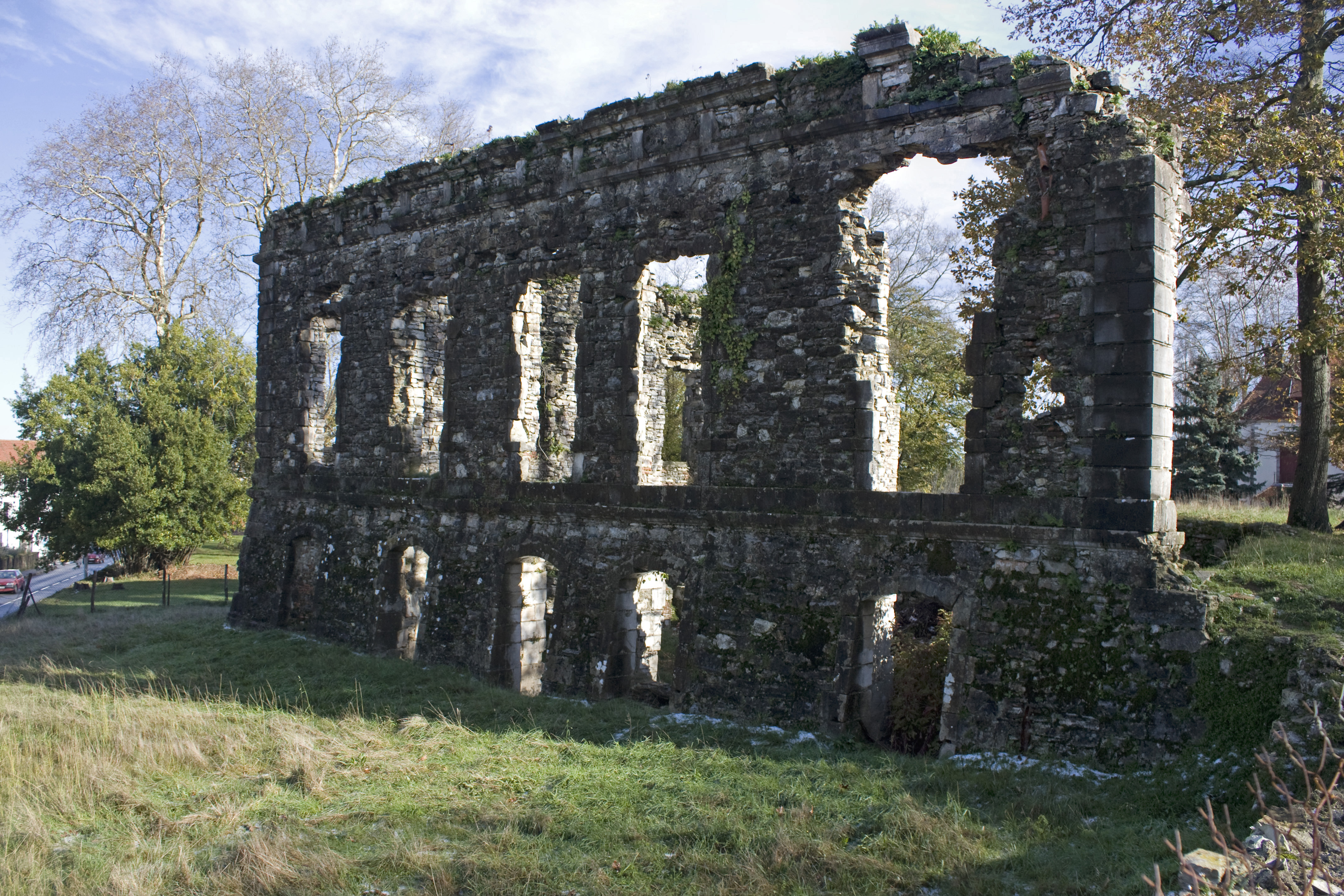
- The ruined castle
- Interactive map of Castle of Marracq
- Location: Bayonne, Pyrénées-Atlantiques, France
- Coordinates: 43°28′47″N 1°29′01″W
- Type: Castle
- Completion date: early 18th century

The Castle of Marracq (French: château de Marracq) is a ruined 18th-century castle in Bayonne, Pyrénées-Atlantiques, France.

It has been an official Historical Monument since 27 September 1907. Since 2012, the ruins have been under renovation because of intense erosion, due to the lack of roof, that caused a risk of collapsing. The walls have been cleansed and the stones and keystones have been repaired or replaced.

== History ==
The castle was built in the early 18th century by Maria Anna of Neuburg, Queen of Spain in exile. However, she never resided in the castle as she preferred her residence of Saint-Michel.

On 19 May 1808 Napoleon I bought the castle from brothers Aaron (1758-1827) and Abraham (1773-1840) Marqfoy. He resided there and the castle became one of his imperial palaces. During his stay in Bayonne, he did not reside at the Château-Vieux, preferring the comfortable Castle of Marracq.

In 1808, the abdication of the Bourbons of Spain in favour of Neopleon I was signed in the Castle of Marracq. Then Napoleon installed his brother Joseph Bonaparte on the throne of Spain.

Upon the Bourbon Restoration, the castle remained empty. The army settled there in 1823, but the castle was devastated by a fire in 1825.

Now a classified Historical Monument, the castle is the property of the Bayonne town council. The collège Marracq is located northeast of the castle.

== Bibliography ==
- Lebourleux, André (December 18, 2007). Le château de Marracq: de Marie-Anne de Neubourg à Napoléon I^{er} (in French). Atlantica. ISBN 978-2758800491.
