= Miguel Artola Gallego =

Spanish intellectual and historian (1923–2020)

Miguel Artola Gallego (12 July 1923 – 26 May 2020) was a Spanish intellectual and historian. He was born in San Sebastián, and died, aged 96, in Madrid.

== Career ==
Artola Gallego was elected to medalla nº 34 of the Real Academia de la Historia on 20 March 1981 and took up his seat on 2 May 1982.

== Achievements and awards ==
- Doctorate honoris causa at the University of the Basque Country in 1989.
- Prince of Asturias Award for social sciences in 1991.
- Doctorate honoris causa at the University of Salamanca in 1992.
- Premio Nacional de Historia de España in 1992 for Encyclopédie d'histoire espagnole.
- Medal of the Autonomous University of Madrid in 1993.
- Grand Cross in the Civil Order of Alfonso X, the Wise in 1996.
- Premium “Eusko Ikaskuntza-Caja Laboral de Humanidades, Cultura, Artes y Ciencias Sociales” in 2000.
- Premium “Nacional de Humanidades Lorenzana” in 2008.

== Publications ==
- Partidos y programas políticos Alianza Editorial, S.A. ISBN 84-206-9699-4 [Complete oeuvre]
- Enciclopedia de historia de España Alianza Editorial, S.A. ISBN 84-206-5294-6 [Complete oeuvre]
- Historia de España Alianza Editorial, S.A. ISBN 84-206-9573-4 [Complete oeuvre]
- La burguesía revolucionaria (1808-1874) Alianza Editorial, S.A., 2001. ISBN 84-206-4251-7 [Volume 5]
- La España de Fernando VII: la guerra de la Independencia y los orígenes del régimen constitucional Espasa-Calpe, S.A., 1999. ISBN 84-239-4980-X [Volume 32]
- Los afrancesados Alianza Editorial, S.A., 1989. ISBN 84-206-2604-X
- Antiguo régimen y revolución liberal Editorial Ariel, S.A., 1991. ISBN 84-344-6512-4
- Los derechos del hombre Alianza Editorial, S.A., 1987. ISBN 84-206-0216-7
- Los Ferrocarriles en España 1844-1943 Banco de España, 1978. ISBN 84-500-2605-9
- La hacienda del Antiguo Régimen Alianza Editorial, S.A., 1982. ISBN 84-206-8042-7
- La hacienda del siglo XIX: progresistas y moderados Alianza Editorial, S.A., 1986. ISBN 84-206-2465-9
- Latifundio Propiedad y Explotación. Siglo XVIII Ministerio de Agricultura, Pesca y Alimentación. Centro de Publicaciones, 1978. ISBN 84-7479-002-6
- El modelo constitucional Español del siglo XIX Fundación Juan March, 1979. ISBN 84-7075-111-5
- Los Orígenes de la España contemporánea (Tomo 1) Centro de Estudios Políticos y Constitucionales, 1975. ISBN 84-259-0428-5
- Los Orígenes de la España contemporánea (Tomo 2) Centro de Estudios Políticos y Constitucionales, 1975. ISBN 84-259-0580-X
- Partidos y programas políticos (1808-1936). (Tomo 1) Aguilar, S.A. d'Ediciones-Grupo Santillana, 1977. ISBN 84-03-12057-5
- Partidos y programas políticos (1808-1936). (Tomo 2) Aguilar, S.A. d'Ediciones-Grupo Santillana, 1977. ISBN 84-03-12074-5
- Textos fundamentales para la Historia Alianza Editorial, S.A., 1992. ISBN 84-206-8009-5
- La España de Fernando VII Espasa-Calpe, S.A., 1999. ISBN 84-239-9742-1
- La monarquía de España Alianza Editorial, S.A., 1999. ISBN 84-206-8195-4
- Vidas en tiempo de crisis Real Academia de la Historia, 1999. ISBN 84-89512-35-3
- Los orígenes de la España contemporánea Centro de Estudios Políticos y Constitucionales. ISBN 84-259-1130-3 [Œuvre complète]
- Las Cortes de Cádiz Marcial Pons, Ediciones de Historia, S.A., 2003. ISBN 84-95379-51-1
