= François-Xavier Guerra =

French historian

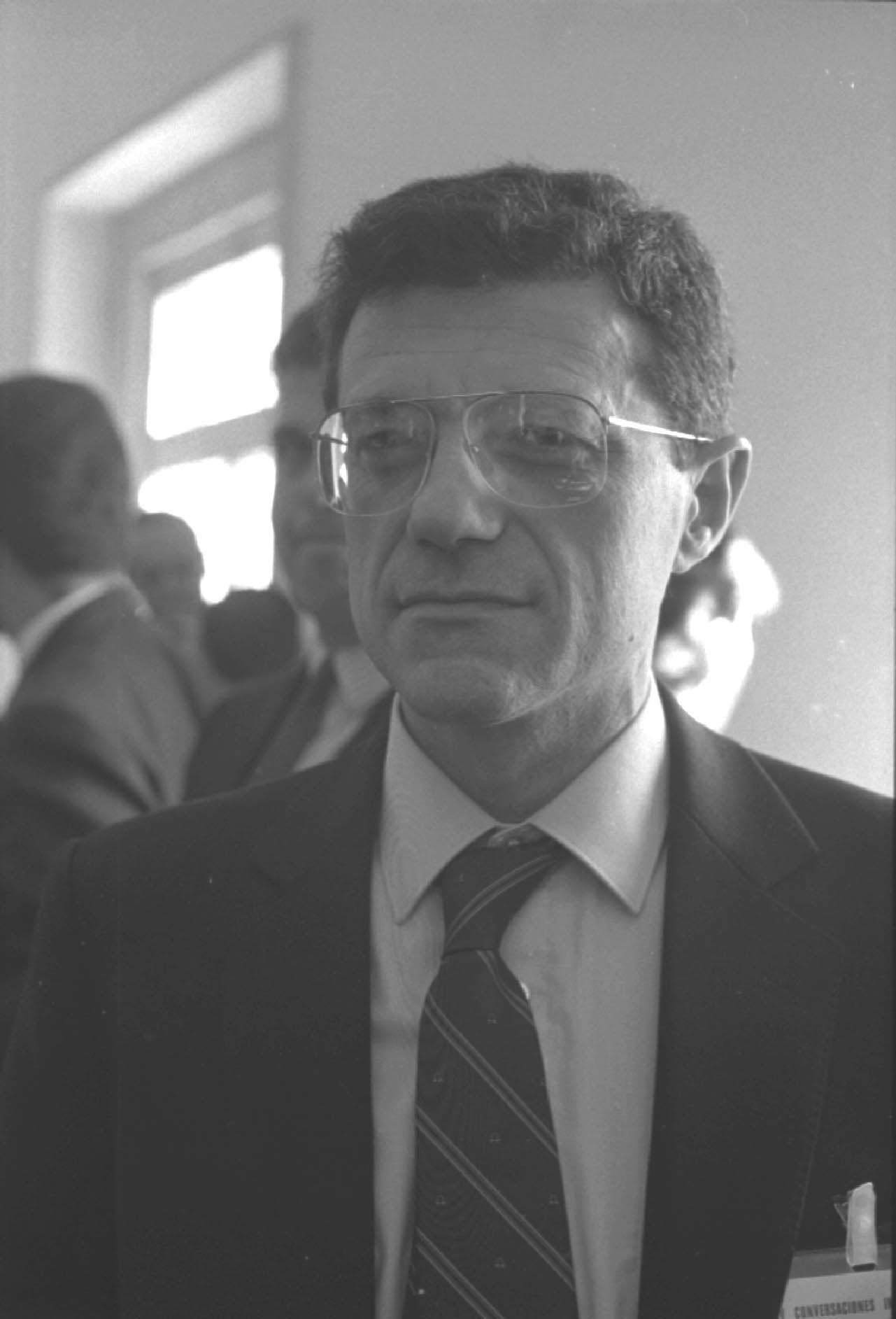
Guerra in 1988

François-Xavier Guerra (27 November 1942 – 10 November 2002) was a French historian born in Spain, who wrote of the Spanish Golden Age and of the history of Mexico up to and during the Mexican Revolution.

== Selected works ==
- Le Mexique : de l'Ancien Régime à la Révolution (in French). L'Harmattan. 1985. ISBN 978-2-85802-442-1.
