= Tumult of Aranjuez =

19th-century Spanish uprising

- Part of the prelude to the Peninsular War
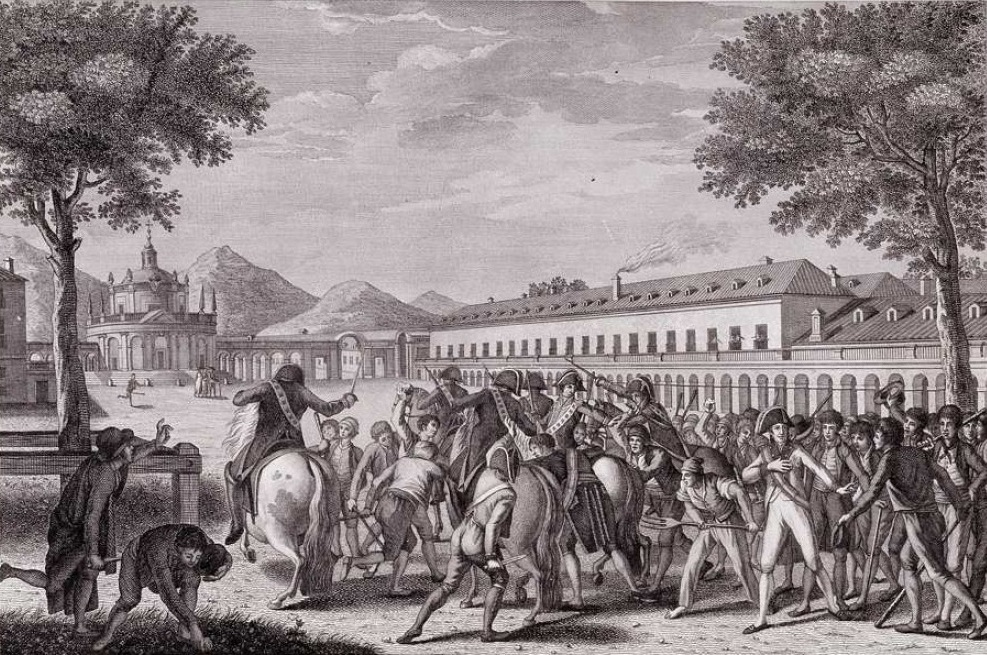
- Fall and Imprisonment of the Prince of Peace, Manuel Godoy
- Date: 17–19 March 1808
- Location: Aranjuez, Spain; 40°02′00″N 3°36′10″W
- Goals: Removal of Manuel Godoy and accession of Ferdinand VII
- Methods: Riot
- Result: Fall of Manuel Godoy from power; Abdication of Charles IV and accession of Ferdinand VII; French occupation of Madrid, and later the Dos de Mayo Uprising

Parties
Supporters of Godoy	Mutineers, citizens, supporters of Ferdinand
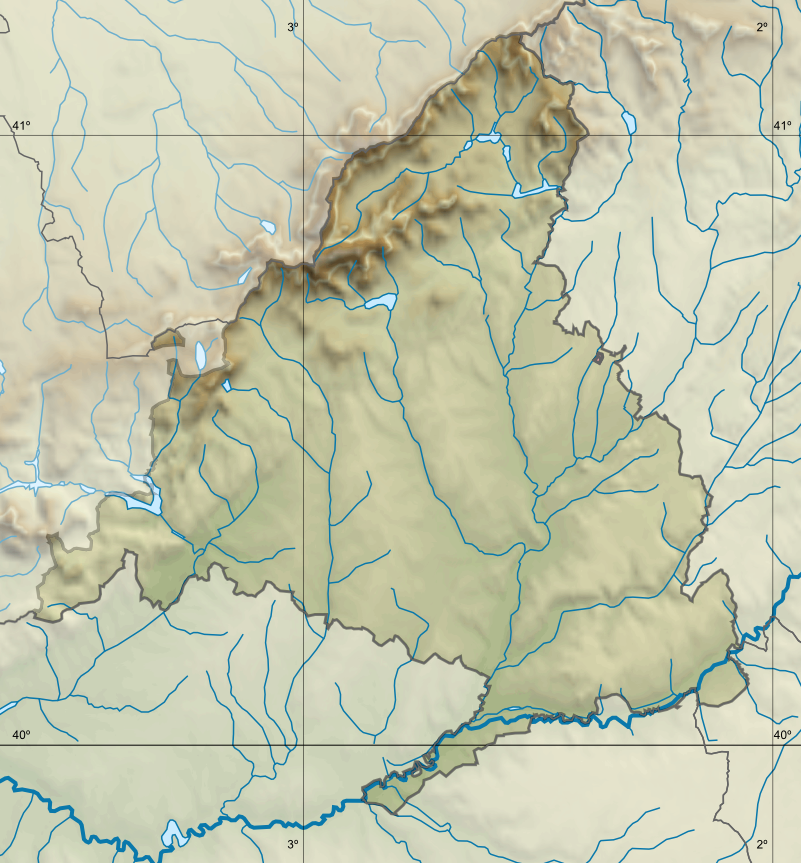
- Location within Community of Madrid Location within Spain

The Tumult of Aranjuez (Spanish: Motín de Aranjuez), also known as the Mutiny of Aranjuez, was an uprising against Prime Minister Manuel Godoy and Charles IV of Spain that took place in the town of Aranjuez on 17–19 March 1808. It was instigated by disgruntled citizens and the supporters of Charles's son Ferdinand VII. Celebrated annually in the first week of September, the event led to the fall of Godoy and abdication of Charles IV and the subsequent accession of Ferdinand VII. It is celebrated in September rather than in March as the revived celebrations in Aranjuez that began in 1988 were added on top of pre-existing September festivals.

== Causes of the Tumult ==
Before the mutiny, Charles IV of Spain's valido, or prime minister, Manuel Godoy, a former member of the Royal Guard, had become unpopular among both the nobles and the Spanish people.

The nobility resented how Godoy had attained power even though he was born in poverty and obscurity. Most notable among them was the King's own son Crown Prince Ferdinand, who had led the El Escorial Conspiracy a few months earlier. The people were upset about Godoy's ambitious nature, his flirting with many women of the court and his willingness to have Catholic Spain make treaties with atheist France against Christian (though Anglican) Britain.

Another important factor was the economic crisis affecting the country, which was heightened after Spain lost much of the Spanish Navy during its war with Britain. This had impaired trade with the United States, causing food shortages and affecting industrial production. In addition, under the terms of the Treaty of Fontainebleau, the King and Godoy had allowed French Emperor Napoleon's troops to cross Spain to attack Portugal. This move was extremely unpopular with the Spanish people, who saw the entry as a humiliating invasion, which it soon became. French troops rapidly occupied the important cities of San Sebastián, Pamplona, and Barcelona, fuelling Spanish resentment towards Godoy.

== Mutiny ==
The uprising took place on 17 March 1808 in Aranjuez, about 48 kilometres (30 mi) south of Madrid, where the royal family and the government were staying while on their way south, anticipating a French invasion from the north. Soldiers, peasants, and members of the general public assaulted Godoy's quarters and captured him. The mutineers made King Charles dismiss Godoy, and, two days later, the court forced the King himself to abdicate in favor of his son and rival, who became Ferdinand VII.

== Aftermath ==
In early May 1808, Napoleon, under the false pretense of resolving the conflict, invited both Charles IV and Ferdinand VII to Bayonne, France. Both were afraid of the French ruler's power and thought it appropriate to accept the invitation. However, once in Bayonne, Napoleon forced them both to renounce the throne and grant it to himself. The Emperor then named his brother Joseph Bonaparte king of Spain. This episode is known as the Abdications of Bayonne, or Abdicaciones de Bayona in Spanish.

== See also ==
- Timeline of the Peninsular War
