= Château-Vieux (Bayonne) =

Castle in Bayonne, France

- Bayonne, Pyrénées-Atlantiques, France
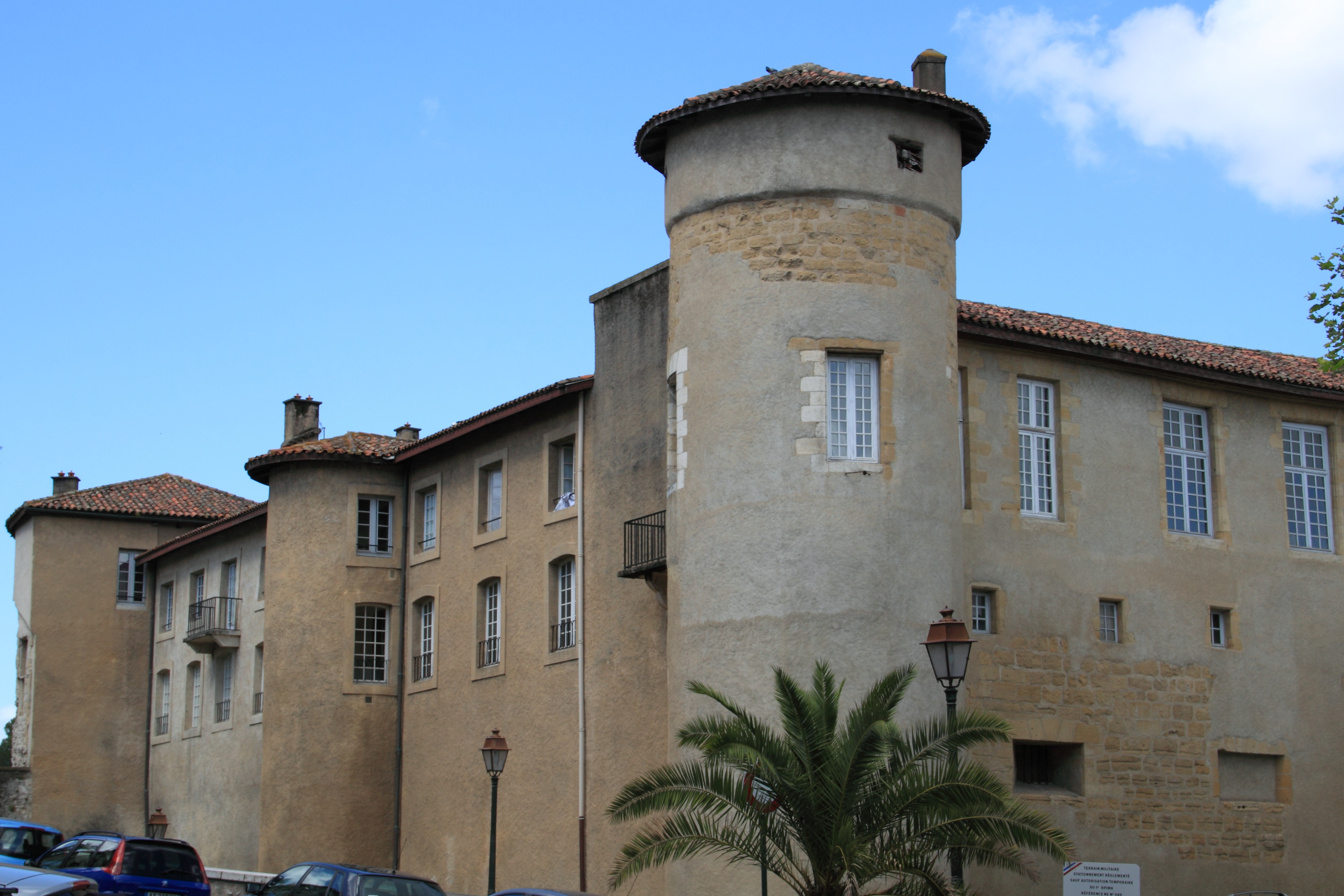
- Château-Vieux in 2011.

Location
- Coordinates: 43°29′30″N 1°28′41″W

Site history
- Built: 11th century

Château-Vieux, also known as the Old Castle of Bayonne, is a castle in the commune of Bayonne, in the Pyrénées-Atlantiques département of France. The castle has been rebuilt many times over the centuries.

== History ==
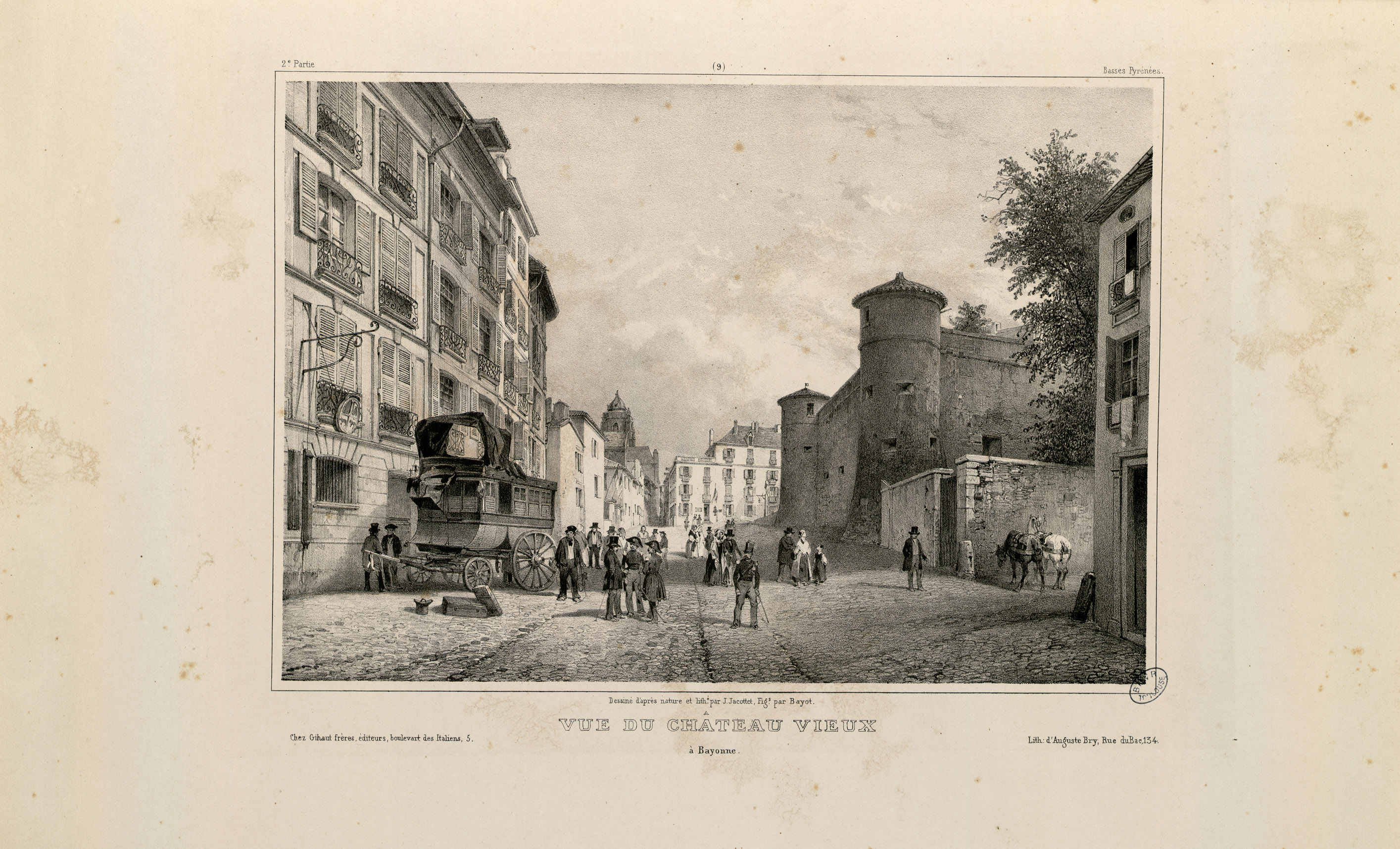
View of the castle in c.1841-1842.

The castle was built on the site of a Roman castrum which housed the garrison and administration of the region named "Lapurdum".

From the end of the 11th century, the Viscounts of Labourd begin building a castle around the three Roman towers and walls around the town, as their residence. The castle became English upon the Duchy of Aquitaine, being inherited by the English crown. After the French took occupation of the castle and town in 1294, an English force led by John St John, laid siege to the town. On 1 January 1295, the citizens of Bayonne drove the French garrison into the castle and opened the town gates to St John. The French garrison of the castle surrendered after a siege of eleven days.

A new castle was constructed in Bayonne during the 15th century in Petit-Bayonne, by King Charles VII of France, as a place to watch the city he had just taken over from the English.

In the 17th century, on the orders of Vauban undertaking fortifications to protect Bayonne, the castle became the North West fortifications of the city. The central tower was destroyed and a fortified forecourt was added. In 1808, Napoléon Bonaparte signed a decree ordering the castle's demolition, which was not undertaken.

It was classified as a historic monument on 7 November 1931.

The castle is currently the mess of the 1st Marine Infantry Parachute Regiment.
