= Bob Beck =

Guam zoologist (1944–2008)

Robert E. Beck Jr. (September 2, 1944 – May 24, 2008) was a zoologist and conservationist, who worked to save Guam's indigenous native birds from 1982 to 2003. Beck championed the fight to save Guam's native birds, such as the Mariana crow, rufous fantail, Guam flycatcher, Guam kingfisher and the Guam rail, known locally as ko'ko' in Chamorro, which are under the extreme threat of extinction due to the non-native brown tree snake and habitat loss. The rufous fantail and the Guam flycatcher listed above are now extinct in the wild in their native Guam. However, the captive and wild populations of the Mariana crow, Guam rail and the Micronesian kingfisher have increased, due in large part to conservation efforts by Beck.

== Early life ==
Bob Beck was born in Hagerstown, Maryland, on September 2, 1944. His parents were Robert E. Beck Sr. and Ruth Powles Beck. Beck graduated from Hagerstown High School in 1962. He obtained his bachelor's degree in education with a concentration in zoology from the University of Maryland. He completed his master's degree in zoology with an emphasis on genetics and population biology at the University of Maryland, the University of Rhode Island and the University of Tennessee. He started his career as a school teacher in the Montgomery County, Maryland, public school system.

== Guamanian bird conservation ==
Beck moved to Guam in 1974 and initially worked as a school teacher for several years. He eventually left teaching to become a zoologist with the Guam Department of Agriculture, Division of Aquatic and Wildlife Resources.

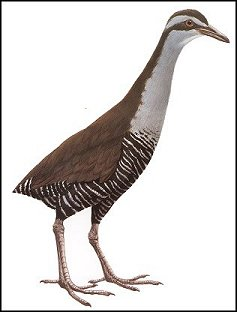
Guam rail

Beck was considered to be instrumental in capturing the remaining native birds on Guam, such as the Guam rail or kingfisher, whose numbers had been decimated due to the accidental introduction of the brown tree snake. Beck, a former Guamanian Department of Agriculture Division of Aquatic and Wildlife Resources wildlife supervisor, established captive breeding programs on Guam. For example, Beck established a stable breeding population of Guam rails, or ko'ko', in captivity and released them on the neighboring island of Rota, in the Northern Mariana Islands. Wildlife biologist Gary Wiles was quoted in the Pacific Daily News as crediting Beck for saving the species, "Bob was one of the first to begin organizing catching the birds so they could be brought into captivity, held there and bred. He started a captive population. We still have Guam rails today because of his efforts."

Beck was also a driving force for the establishment of captive breeding programs for native Guam rails in zoos throughout the United States. The Guam rail breeding program initially began at just three zoos, the Bronx Zoo, the Philadelphia Zoo and the National Zoo in Washington D.C. However, the program has been expanded to include seventeen zoos nationwide, including the Audubon Zoo in New Orleans and the San Diego Zoo. There are now over 120 individual Guam rails at the program's facilities on Guam and thirty-five Guam rails on the mainland United States.

Bob Beck stayed on Guam and remained involved in his programs following his retirement in 2003. He died in Tamuning, Guam, on May 24, 2008 at the age of 63. He was married to his wife, Patricia Rossett, from 1978 until 1992. The couple had two children, Erik R. Beck and Joanna R. Beck.
