= Guam National Wildlife Refuge =

Wildlife conservation area in Guam

- IUCN category IV (habitat/species management area)
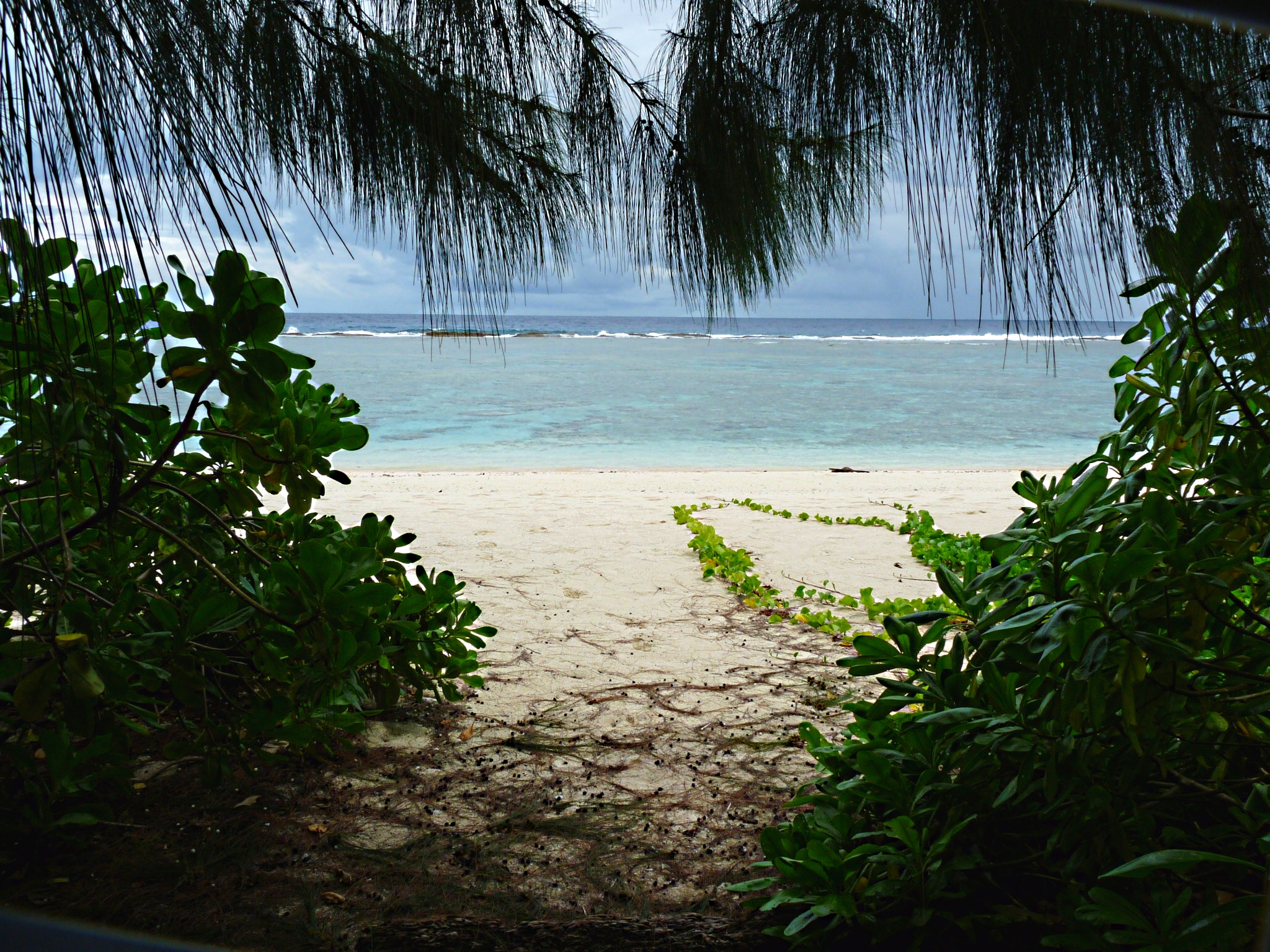
- The beach off Ritidian Point

- Location within Guam
- Location: Dededo / Yigo, Guam, United States
- Nearest city: Dededo, Guam / Yigo, Guam
- Coordinates: 13°39′2″N 144°51′38″E
- Area: 23,659 acres (95.74 km^{2}) total 23,288 acres (94.24 km^{2}) land 371 acres (1.50 km^{2}) reefs and ocean
- Established: 1993
- Visitors: 90,000
- Governing body: Department of Defense 22,456 acres (90.88 km^{2}); Fish and Wildlife Service 1,203 acres (4.87 km^{2})
- Website: Guam National Wildlife Refuge

The Guam National Wildlife Refuge is composed of three units: the Andersen Air Force Base Overlay Unit (Air Force Overlay Unit), the Navy Overlay Unit, and the Ritidian Unit. The Ritidian Unit (CHamoru: Puntan Litekyan) is on the northernmost tip of Guam and encompasses approximately 1,217 acres (493 hectares), including 385 terrestrial acres (156 terrestrial hectares) and 832 acres (337 hectares) of submerged areas offshore.

== Description ==
=== Ritidian Unit ===
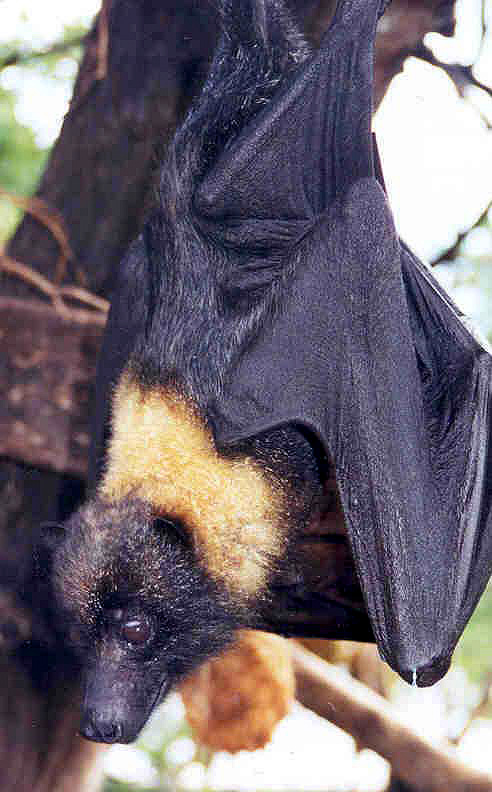
The endangered Mariana fruit bat or flying fox

The Ritidian Unit is at the far northern point of Guam and is the only unit open to the public. It was established in 1993, in response to the 1984 listing of six species as endangered, and was designated critical habitat in 2004 for three of these species: the Mariana fruit bat, the Guam Micronesian Kingfisher, and the Mariana crow. The Navy used the area as a high-security communications station throughout the Cold War and donated the 1,203 acres (4.87 km^{2}) of land to the Fish and Wildlife Service in 1993. Guam's Delegate to Congress at that time, Robert A. Underwood, objected to the transfer as a violation of indigenous Chamorro land rights for not returning the property to the pre-military owners. Sailors from the USS Frank Cable continued the Navy connection by volunteering and creating a nature path for visitors. The Ritidian Unit offices and beaches close to the public at 4 PM every day. They are also closed any time the Guam Homeland Security Office of Civil Defense issues a tropical cyclone condition of readiness 3, 2, or 1. Additionally, the beaches are closed to the public during tropical storm warnings issued by the National Weather Service.

Ritidian Point contains the archaeological site of a pre-Magellan Chamorro village, a former barrier reef that is now a 500-foot (152-meter) limestone cliff and beaches where threatened green sea turtles nest. This area is the only designated critical habitat in Guam because it was home to some of the last confirmed populations of the Mariana fruit bat, Guam kingfisher, Mariana common moorhen, and Mariana crow. The accidental introduction of the brown tree snake is considered the primary cause for the decline of native Guam bird species.

=== Military overlay units ===
There are two additional units, one on Andersen Air Force Base and a grouping of non-contiguous lands on Navy properties collectively called the Navy Overlay Unit. In total, the military owns 95% of the Refuge, 22,456 acres (90.88 km^{2}), and does not allow tourism. The purposes of the Refuge’s Navy and Air Force Overlay Units are separate from the purposes of the Ritidian Unit and are specified in Cooperative Agreements with the US Fish & Wildlife Service. The areas are considered an overlay because military needs take precedence but the Fish & Wildlife Service has consulting rights. The areas may face additional stress because of the movement of troops from Okinawa.

These units are largely forested and the main preservation initiative involves the Serianthes nelsonii tree. The critically endangered plant is endemic to the southern Marianas Islands and only one mature tree is known in Guam. Efforts to plant new seedlings have been coordinated through the University of Guam.

=== Important Bird Area ===
Much of the refuge has been recognized as an Important Bird Area (IBA) by BirdLife International because it supports populations of Mariana swiftlets, Guam rails, Mariana crows and Micronesian starlings, as well as containing habitat for Guam kingfishers.

== See also ==
- List of National Wildlife Refuges
