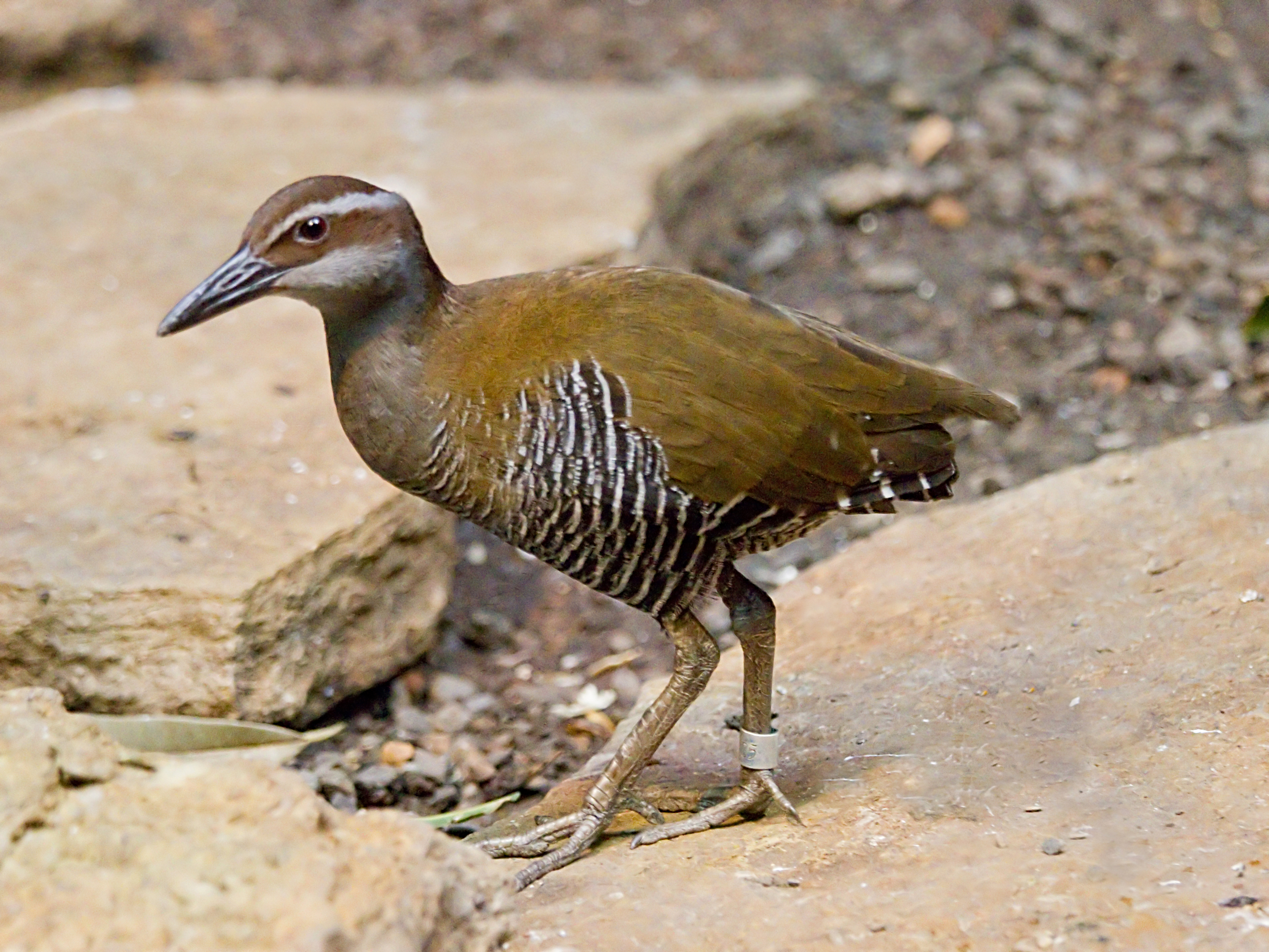
- Guam rail at the Cincinnati Zoo

Conservation status
- Critically Endangered (IUCN 3.1)

Scientific classification
- Kingdom: Animalia
- Phylum: Chordata
- Class: Aves
- Order: Gruiformes
- Family: Rallidae
- Genus: Gallirallus
- Species: G. owstoni

Binomial name
- Gallirallus owstoni (Rothschild, 1895)

Synonyms
- Rallus owstoni (Rothschild, 1895); Hypotaenidia owstoni

= Guam rail =

Species of bird

The Guam rail (Gallirallus owstoni), known locally and in Chamorro as ko'ko', is a small, terrestrial bird endemic to Guam in the Rallidae family. They are one of the island's few remaining endemic bird species. The species became extinct in the wild in the early 1980s when biologists captured the remaining wild population to establish a breeding program. They have since been successfully introduced to the nearby Rota and Cocos islands. In 2019, they became the second bird species to be reclassified by the International Union for the Conservation of Nature from Extinct in the Wild to Critically Endangered.

Adult male and female plumage is primarily brown with barred black-and-white plumage on their underside. Their heads are brown with a grey stripe running above the eye and a medium-length grey bill. They have strong legs with long toes that help them walk over marshy ground. Their most common vocalizations are short "kip" notes, but also screeches during the breeding season.

Guam rail numbers fell drastically due to predation by invasive brown tree snakes. The species is now being bred in captivity by the Division of Aquatic and Wildlife Resources on Guam, and at some mainland U.S. zoos. Since 1995, more than 100 rails have been introduced on the island of Rota in the Commonwealth of the Northern Mariana Islands, in an attempt to establish a wild breeding colony. In 2010, 16 birds were released onto Cocos Island, with 12 more being introduced in 2012.

== Taxonomy and etymology ==
The Guam rail was first described as Hypotaenidia owstoni in 1895 by Lord Walter Rothschild. Rothschild announced the specific name owstoni was "in honour of Mr. Alan Owston, of Yokohama, whose men have collected for me on the Marianne Islands." The generic name, Hypotaenidia, comes from the Ancient Greek hypo meaning "under" and tainia meaning "stripe" or "band." This refers to the banded feathers seen on their underside and wings, typically found across rail species. The Guam rail is now placed in the genus Gallirallus that was introduced in 1841 by Frédéric de Lafresnaye.

== Description ==
Guam rails are a medium-sized rail species, growing to about 11 inches (28 cm) in total length. Adults will weigh around 7 to 12 ounces (200 to 350 grams). They have an elongated body, with small wings and medium-length legs. Guam rails have underdeveloped wing muscles and are considered flightless, though they can fly about 3 to 10 feet (1 to 3 meters) at once. Their strong leg muscles make them fast runners instead.

Adult Guam rails are monomorphic, meaning males and females have the same plumage and characteristics. They are primarily brown, with a grey bill and tan-colored legs. The head and back are brown. It has a grey eye stripe and throat, a dark blackish breast with white barring, and the legs and beak are dark brown.

== Distribution and habitat ==
Historically, the rail was found only on Guam. The island covers about 132,230 acres. According to a 2013 survey, about 53% of the island is forested. Rails were once distributed widely across most habitats on the island, including mixed forest, savanna, grasslands, fern thickets, and agricultural areas. Individuals observed by the Guam Division of Aquatic and Wildlife Resources were noted as preferring edge habitats that provided good cover.

Today, the rail is still found on Guam, though in captivity, with wild populations introduced on Rota and Cocos Islands. Since 1985, the rails have only lived in captivity on Guam, located at the Guam Department of Agriculture.

== Ecology and behavior ==
Guam rails are secretive, fast birds. Though they are capable of a short bursts of flight, they seldom fly. It was found more frequently in savannas and scrubby mixed forest than in uniform tracts of mature forest. It was usually found in dense vegetation but it was also observed bathing or feeding along roadsides or forest edges. Its call is a loud, piercing whistle or series of whistles, usually given by two or more birds in response to a loud noise, the call of another rail, or other disturbances. Though individuals will respond almost invariably to the call of another rail, the species is generally silent.

=== Breeding ===
It is a year-round ground nester and lays 2–4 eggs per clutch, and both parents share in the construction of a shallow nest of leaves and grass. They mature at six months of age, and have been known to produce up to 10 clutches per year in captivity.

Their nesting habits make them highly susceptible to predators, such as the native Mariana monitor and the invasive feral pig, feral cat, feral dog, mangrove monitor, brown tree snake, black rat, and Norway rat.

=== Food and feeding ===
Guam rails are omnivorous foragers known to consume gastropods, insects, geckos, seeds, and vegetable matter. A large part of their diet consists of giant African snails, which were introduced to Guam around 1945 and became an easy food source for the birds. Pieces of snail shell and coral have been found in the stomach and gizzard contents of Guam rails, suggesting use as grit.

Guam rails have been observed foraging and hunting. When foraging, they peck food from the ground and eat seeds and flowers from grasses. They have also been observed hunting insects, particularly butterflies.

=== Parasites ===
The species hosted a unique louse, Rallicola guami, which seems to have been a victim of conservation-induced extinction, since Guam rails taken into captivity were deloused to assist survival; it is considered most likely extinct.

=== Threats ===
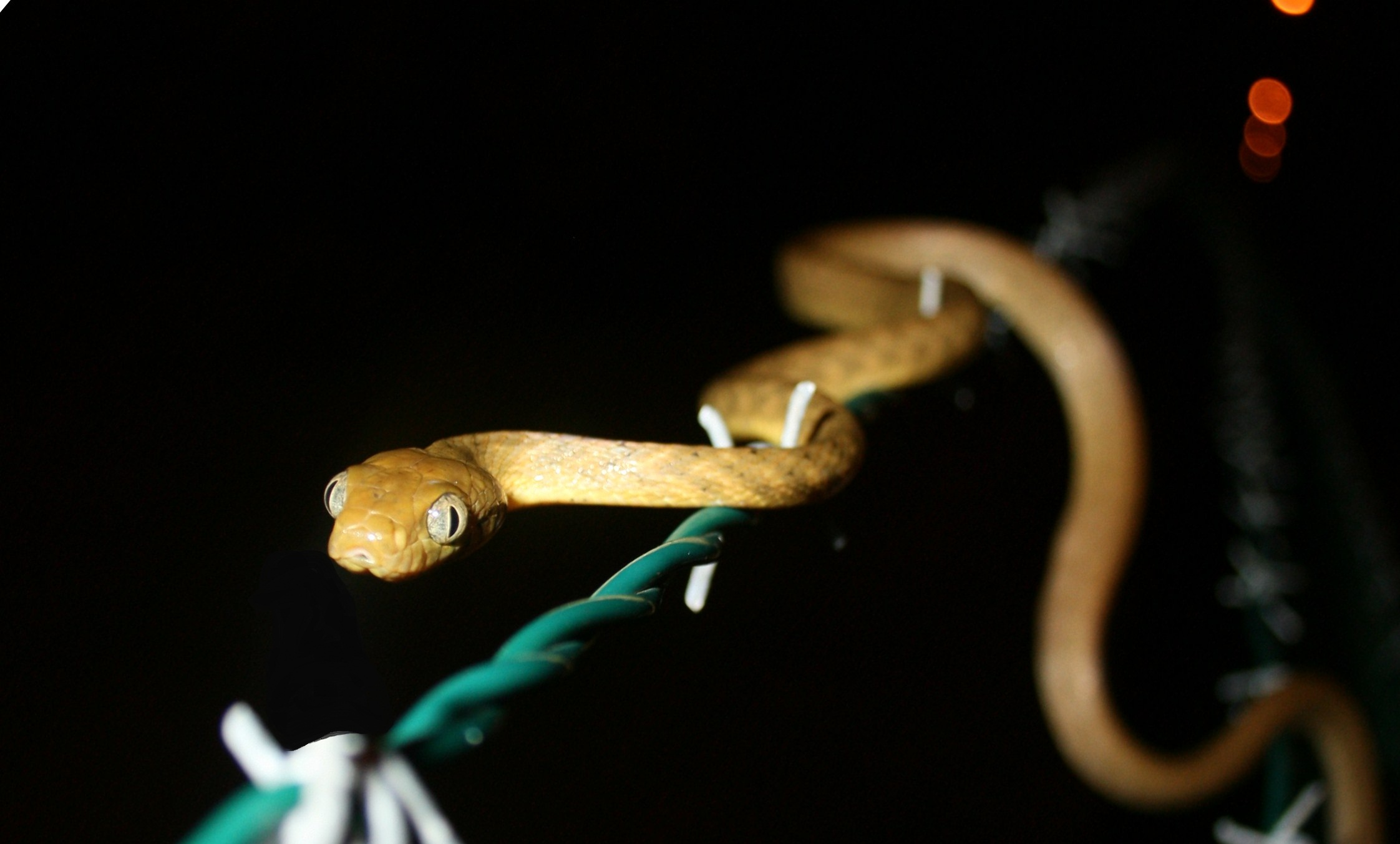
A brown tree snake on a barbed wire fence.

The brown tree snake (Boiga irregularis) is one of the primary threats to the survival of the Guam rail and the introduction of the snake has been catastrophic for Guam's biodiversity. The snake was likely passively introduced to the island as a stowaway in a military cargo ship after World War II. Once introduced to Guam, the snakes thrived off an abundance of prey lacking natural predators. Brown tree snakes are opportunistic feeders and have been observed on Guam consuming lizards, birds, eggs, insects, small mammals, and human trash. The snake is nocturnal, arboreal, and adept at preying on roosting or nesting birds and their offspring.

Over time, the snake decimated the other native avifauna in Guam's forests. With less prey found in the trees, it took advantage of the nests of the Guam rail, found on the forest floor. It is unlikely the snakes could prey on the larger adult rails, instead feeding on the eggs and nestlings.

Invasive ungulates, including feral pigs and Philippine deer, destroy native forests and consequently, Guam rail habitat. Their behaviors contribute to the decline of Guam's forests by trampling vegetation and rooting for food. In addition to this, feral pigs wallowing and deer thinning the forest canopy contribute to the ecosystem's disruption. These factors combined have contributed to altered soil properties, forest ecology, and decreases in groundcover.

Feral cats have also proven to be a major barrier to successfully reintroducing the species to Guam. Following the reintroduction of Guam rails at Andersen Air Force Base in 2006, feral cats killed all of the introduced birds within eight weeks.

== Conservation ==
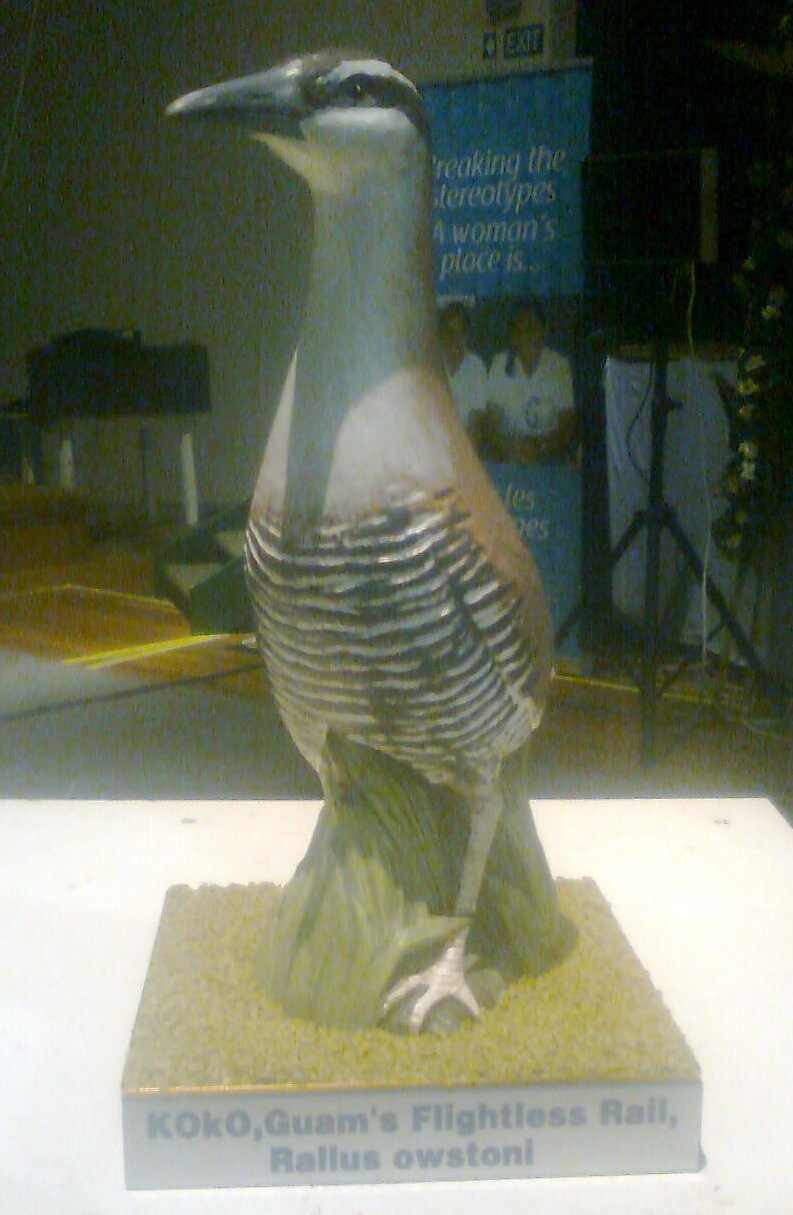
Ceremonial statue of a Guam rail (ko'ko), presented as a gift by the Government of Guam.

=== Decline ===
The species was once abundant, with an estimated population between 60,000 and 80,000 in the late 1960s and early 1970s. Nine of the eleven species of native forest-dwelling birds have been extirpated from Guam. Five of these were endemic at the species or subspecies level, and are now extinct. The Guam rail and the Guam kingfisher, are bred in captivity with hope that they may eventually be released back into the wild. Several other native species exist in precariously small numbers, and their future on Guam is perilous. Most native forest species, including the Guam rail, were virtually extinct when they were listed as threatened or endangered by the U.S. Fish and Wildlife Service in 1984.

Appreciable losses of the Guam rail was not evident until the mid-1960s. By 1963, several formerly abundant rails had disappeared from the central part of the island where snakes were most populous. By the late 1960s, it had begun to decline in the central and southern parts of the island, and remained abundant only in isolated patches of forest on the northern end of the island. Snakes began affecting the rail in the north-central and extreme northern parts of the island in the 1970s and 1980s, respectively. The population declined severely from 1969 to 1973, and continued to decline until the mid-1980s. It was last seen in the wild in 1987.

=== Conservation efforts ===
Zoologist Bob Beck, a wildlife supervisor with the Guam Department of Agriculture's Division of Aquatic and Wildlife Resources, is credited with leading the efforts to capture the remaining wild Guam rails, Guam kingfishers, and other native birds to save them from extinction. His efforts to save the Guam rail began in 1982, and lasted more than 20 years. Beck was considered to be instrumental in capturing the remaining population of Guam rails, and establishing captive breeding programs for the species on Guam. He later established a release site and an introduced a breeding population of Guam rails on the neighboring island of Rota in the Northern Mariana Islands.

Beck was also a driving force in establishing Guam rail breeding programs in zoos throughout the mainland United States. These initially began with just three zoos in the U.S.—the Bronx Zoo, the Philadelphia Zoo, and the National Zoo in Washington, D.C.—and was soon expanded to other zoos.

The efforts by Beck, and others, to save the species proved successful. By the time of Beck's death in 2008 there were approximately 120 Guam rails in captivity in Guam, and another 35 birds were in captive breeding programs throughout the U.S. at a total of 17 zoos then participating – including the Audubon Zoo in New Orleans, the San Diego Zoo, the Santa Fe College Teaching Zoo, and zoos in Chicago, Houston, and San Antonio.

By 2019, the numbers of Guam rails surviving in South Pacific habitats near Guam had increased to 200 birds on Rota as well as another 60 to 80 birds on Cocos Island, where releases had taken place since the introduction of 16 birds in late 2010.

Biologist Gary Wiles, who worked on the Guam rail breeding program from 1981 to 2000, said of Beck's work in helping to save the species: "Bob was one of the first to begin organizing catching the birds, so they could be brought into captivity, held there, and bred. He started a captive population. We still have Guam rails today because of his efforts." Suzanne Medina, a wildlife biologist, also credited Beck with saving the Guam rail, "Bob Beck was the ko'ko' champion; [he] was Guam's champion at the time for preventing the extinction of these birds."

The U.S. Geological Survey and U.S. Fish & Wildlife Service have worked in collaboration with the Department of Defense and territorial government since the 1990s to control and mitigate the brown tree snake population and assist in efforts to reintroduce the rail and other bird species to Guam.

In November 2010, sixteen Guam rails were released on Cocos Island, a 33 hectare atoll located 1 mile off the southern tip of Guam, as part of its reintroduction two decades after its extinction in the wild. It was an effort to provide safe nesting areas for the rails, as well as a place for the public to see them in the wild. Before the reintroduction, rats were eradicated off the island, and the forest was further enhanced with native trees. A native lizard survey was conducted to make sure that the rails had enough food to eat. Monitor lizard populations were reduced to minimize their impacts on the newly released rails. The reintroduction proved to be successful, as evidence of breeding has been observed. This will provide a model environment to develop strategies for future reintroductions, as well as expertise in rodent and snake detection, eradication, and biosecurity measures.

== In culture ==
Guam's symbolic bird is the Ko'ko'.

Ko'ko' Road Race Weekend is hosted every year on Guam to raise awareness of the species and conservation efforts.

== See also ==
- Bob Beck
- List of birds of Guam
- List of birds of the Northern Mariana Islands
