= Santa Fe College =

Public college in Gainesville, Florida, US

- Former names: Santa Fe Junior College (1965–1972); Santa Fe Community College (1972–2008)
- Type: Public college
- Established: 1965; 61 years ago
- Parent institution: Florida College System
- Accreditation: SACS
- Endowment: $35.3 million (2024)
- Budget: $98.1 million (2024)
- President: Paul Broadie II
- Faculty: 251 (full-time); 404 (part-time)
- Undergraduates: 12,729 (fall 2022)
- Location: Gainesville, Florida, United States; 29°40′42″N 82°25′57″W
- Campus: Midsize suburb
- Colors: Saints blue and white
- Nickname: Saints
- Sporting affiliations: NJCAA Region 8 – Mid-Florida Conference
- Mascot: Caesar the St. Bernard
- Website: sfcollege.edu

Santa Fe College is a public college in Gainesville, Florida, United States. It is part of the Florida College System and offers both associate and baccalaureate degree programs. Established in 1965 by the Florida Legislature as Santa Fe Junior College, the institution began classes in September 1966. It was renamed Santa Fe Community College in 1972 and became "Santa Fe College" in 2008 to highlight its baccalaureate programs.

== Campuses ==
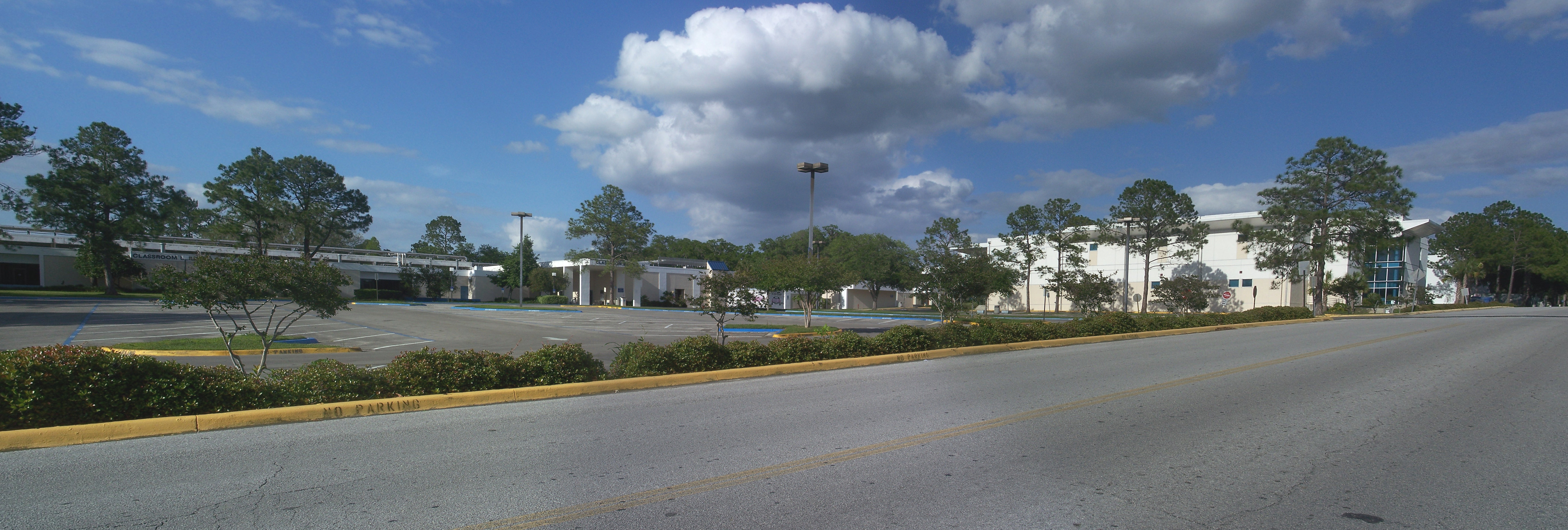
Main campus, southern end

Santa Fe College operates multiple campuses and centers throughout Alachua and Bradford counties:

- Northwest Campus: The main campus, located on 175 acres (71 ha) in northwest Gainesville, opened in 1972.
- Andrews Center: Located in Starke, opened in 1985 and has since expanded.
- Blount Center: Situated in downtown Gainesville, opened in 1990, with expansions in 1993 and 2006.
- Charles R. and Nancy V. Perry Center for Emerging Technologies: Located in Alachua and opened in 2009, this center focuses on clinical laboratory technology and biotechnology degrees.
- Davis Center: Located in Archer and opened in 2003.
- Kirkpatrick Center: Near Gainesville Regional Airport, opened in 1972 and is also known as the Institute of Public Safety, providing training for law enforcement, emergency medical services, and aviation sciences.
- Watson Center: Located in Keystone Heights, opened in 2005 and added a second building in 2006.

== Academics ==
Santa Fe College offers over 50 accredited programs in technology and applied sciences, primarily leading to associate degrees. It provides programs in fields such as dental assisting, air conditioning repair, automotive technology, and more. The college’s zoo animal technology program is notable for its onsite training at the Santa Fe College Teaching Zoo.

The college offers nine bachelor’s degrees in areas including accounting, clinical laboratory science, early childhood education, health services administration, industrial biotechnology, information systems technology, multimedia and video production technology, nursing, and organizational management.

== Library ==
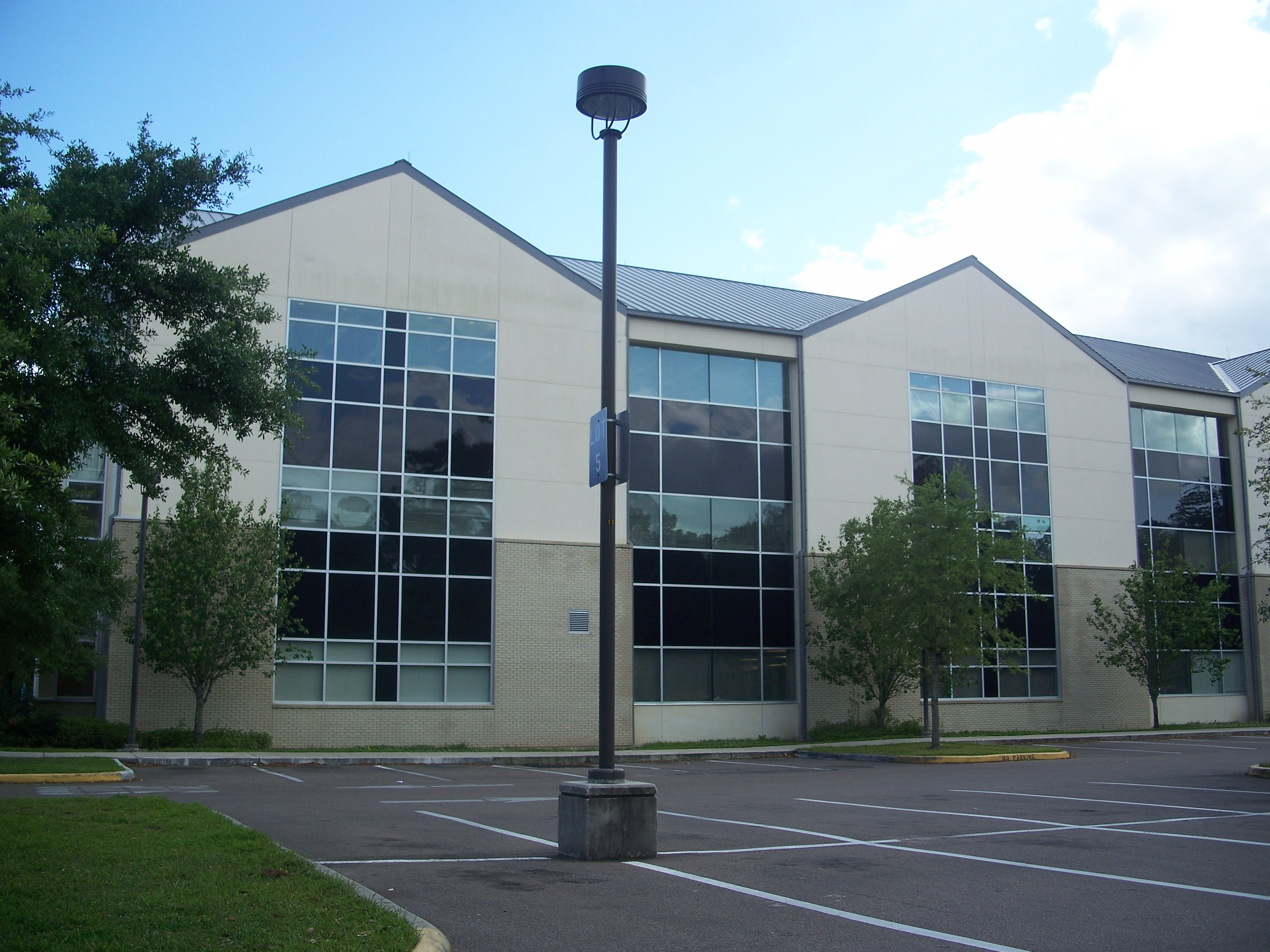
View of the multi-story library

The Lawrence W. Tyree Library, located on the Northwest Campus, opened in January 2002. The $10 million facility includes study rooms, a coffee shop, computer stations, and a comprehensive online catalog. It is named in honor of Lawrence W. Tyree, a former president of the college.

== Athletics ==
Santa Fe College is represented by the Santa Fe Saints, with varsity teams competing in Region 8 of the National Junior College Athletic Association (NJCAA).

=== Fight Song ===
In 2009, Santa Fe College adopted a fight song. "Saints Forever" was performed for the first time on Tuesday, April 21, 2009, between softball games in Gainesville. The song was a collaboration between Chris Sharp, the college's director of bands, and Ryan B. Leverone, a Santa Fe College student.

== Awards and recognition ==
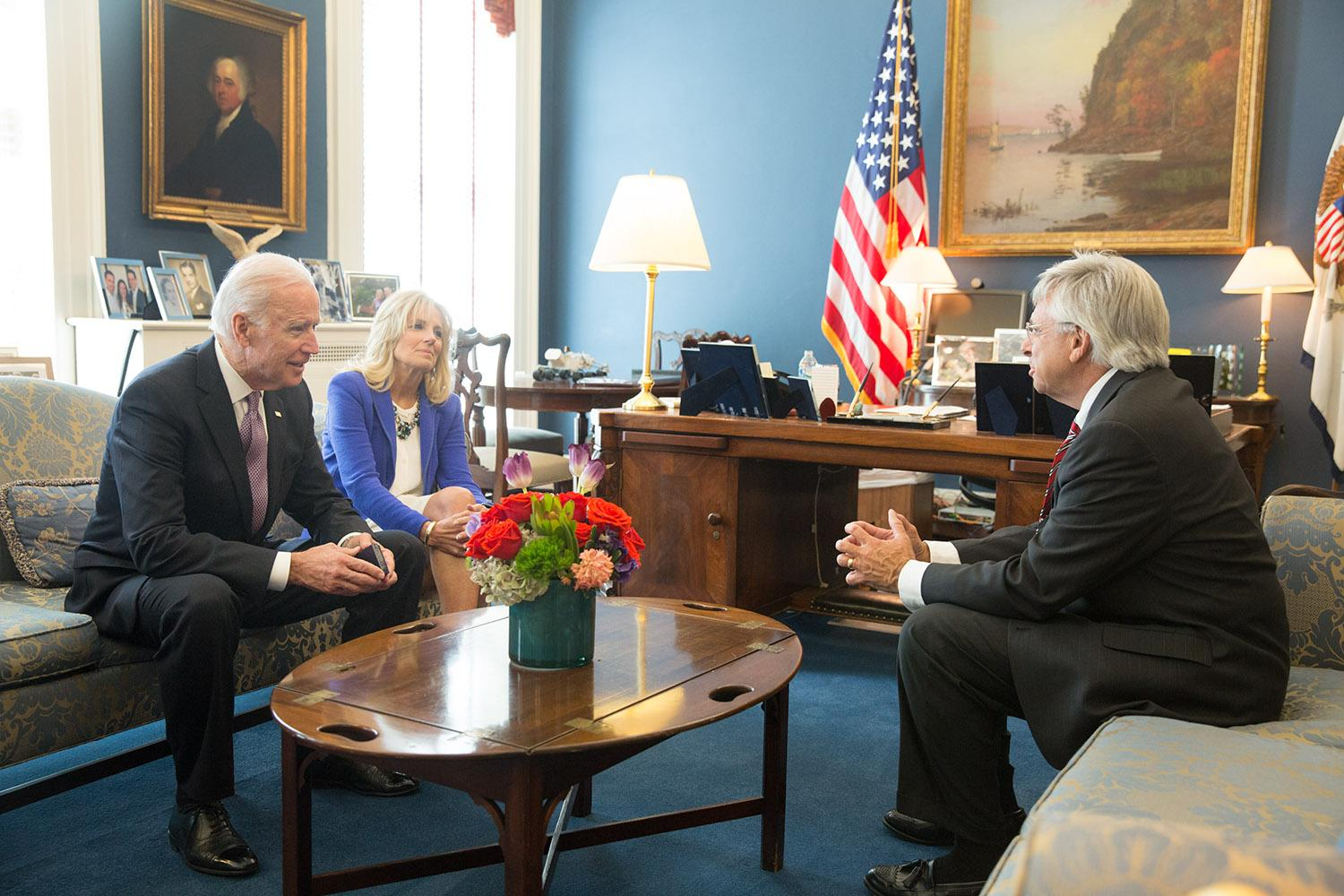
United States President Joe Biden and First Lady Jill Biden meet with Jackson N. Sasser, President of Santa Fe College, after the college won the Aspen Prize

In 2012 and 2014, the Aspen Institute named Santa Fe College one of the ten best community colleges in the U.S. In 2015, the college received the Aspen Prize for Community College Excellence, recognizing it as the top community college in the country.

In 2015, the Lawrence W. Tyree Library received the Excellence in Academic Libraries Award from the Association of College & Research Libraries.

== Notable alumni ==
- Debbie Boyd, politician
- Robin Campbell, U.S. Olympian (1980–1984)
- Craig Fugate, former FEMA Director
- Adam Kluger, advertising executive and founder of The Kluger Agency
- Connie Mack IV, former U.S. representative
- Marco Rubio, politician
- Jeremy Hunter, musician and composer known as Skatune Network
- Mallex Smith, professional baseball player
- Karen Thurman, former U.S. representative and chair of the Florida Democratic Party
- Clovis Watson Jr., politician and law enforcement officer

== See also ==
- Santa Fe College Kika Silva Pla Planetarium
- Santa Fe College Teaching Zoo
