= Paul Broadie II =

American community college president

- Born: April 18, 1968 (age 58)
- Education: Mercy College (B.S.); Long Island University (MBA); Colorado State University (Ph.D.)
- Occupation: Academic administrator
- Known for: President of Santa Fe College

Paul Broadie II (born April 18, 1968) is an American college president and academic administrator. He became the fifth president of Santa Fe College in Gainesville, Florida in 2020, after previously serving as president of both Housatonic Community College and Gateway Community College in Connecticut.

== Education ==
Broadie received a bachelor of science degree in business administration from Mercy College (now Mercy University), a master of business administration degree from Long Island University, and a Ph.D. from Colorado State University.

== Career ==
=== Connecticut community colleges ===
Broadie has spent much of his career in community college leadership. In 2015 he was appointed president of Housatonic Community College in Bridgeport, Connecticut, and in 2017 he was also named president of Gateway Community College in New Haven, Connecticut, becoming one of the first administrators in the state to preside over two community colleges at once.

At Housatonic and Gateway, Broadie emphasized workforce development, transfer pathways and community partnerships. Under his leadership, Housatonic was selected by the Aspen Institute as one of the top 150 community colleges in the United States and named an Achieving the Dream Leader Institution, while Gateway joined the Achieving the Dream network. He oversaw campus expansion projects, including a 46,000-square-foot addition to Housatonic’s Lafayette Hall, and initiatives aimed at improving student success and support services.

=== Santa Fe College presidency ===
On October 4, 2019, Santa Fe College in Gainesville, Florida announced that Broadie had been selected as the college’s new president, following the retirement of Jackson Sasser. He became the fifth president in the college’s history and commenced his duties at Santa Fe in February 2020.

During Broadie’s presidency, Santa Fe College has focused on expanding access to higher education and addressing racial and economic disparities in its service region. In 2020 the college received a $40 million gift from philanthropist MacKenzie Scott, the largest donation in its history, which Broadie described as “transformational” and directed toward closing equity gaps and increasing educational opportunity.

Broadie has launched or overseen several initiatives at Santa Fe, including the ACB Excel Program, the SF Achieve scholarship and college-going program, a STEM-focused charter school based on the P-TECH model, and a Center for Teaching and Learning Excellence, all aimed at improving social and economic mobility for students and their families.

== Honors and recognition ==
In 2018, Broadie was named by the Connecticut NAACP as one of the “100 Most Influential Blacks in Connecticut.”

In June 2019, The WorkPlace, a regional workforce development organization based in Bridgeport, Connecticut, honored Broadie with its President’s Award in recognition of his leadership of Housatonic and Gateway Community Colleges and his efforts to expand workforce and educational opportunities. Mercy University has also cited Broadie’s work in advancing equity-focused initiatives and major philanthropic support at Santa Fe College in connection with the award of an honorary degree.
