= Santa Fe College Teaching Zoo =

Zoo and zookeeper training facility in Gainesville, Florida, United States

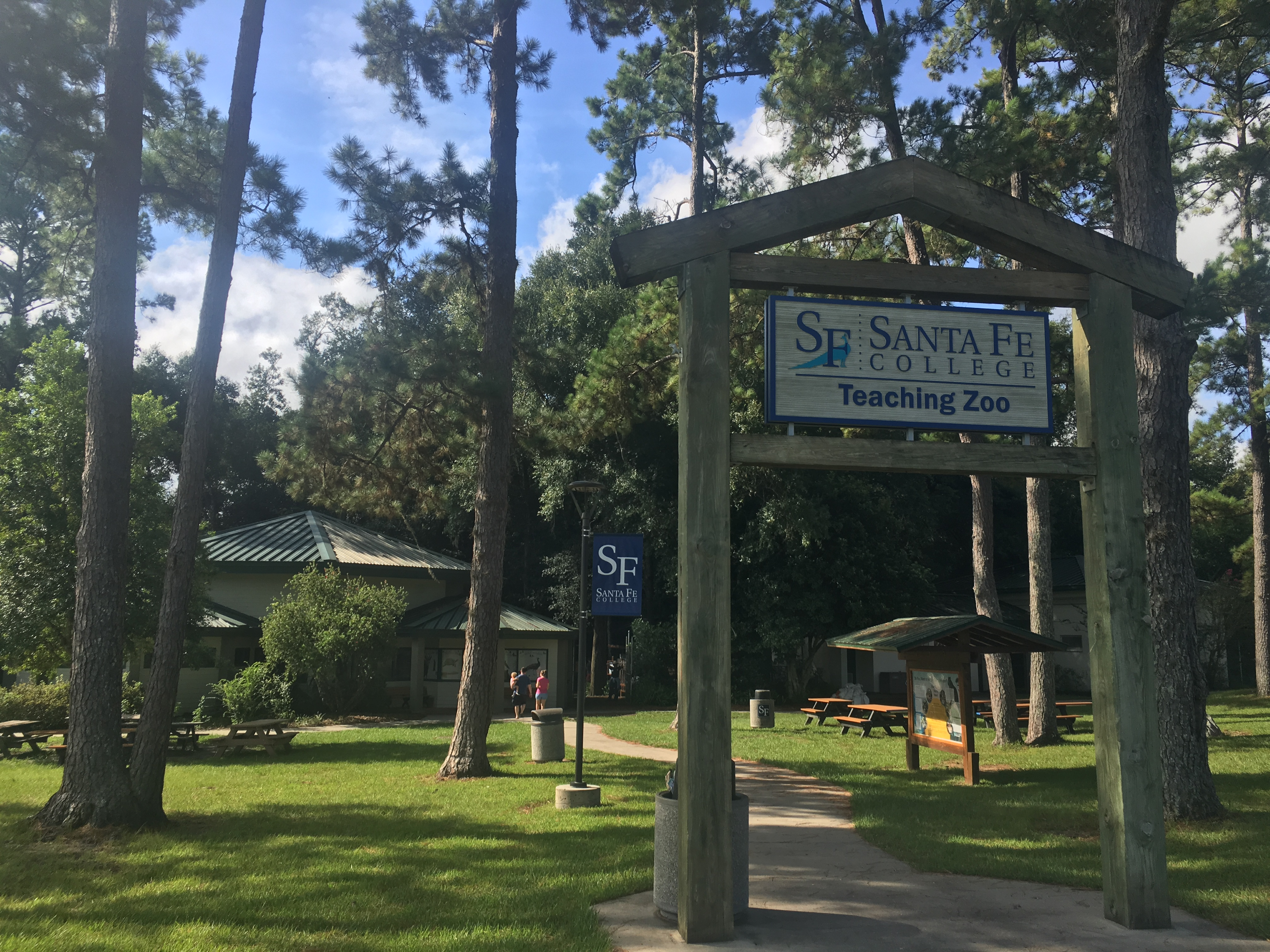
- Santa Fe College Teaching Zoo entrance, August 2019
- Interactive map of Santa Fe College Teaching Zoo
- 29.6819°N 82.4382°W
- Location: Gainesville, Florida
- Land area: 10 acres (4.0 ha)
- No. of animals: 200+
- No. of species: 70
- Memberships: AZA
- Website: www.sfcollege.edu/zoo

The Santa Fe College Teaching Zoo is a 10-acre (4.0 ha) zoo in Gainesville, Florida. Located on Santa Fe College's main campus, it is the only college zookeeper training facility in the United States. Since 2000, the zoo has been accredited by the Association of Zoos and Aquariums (AZA).

Guided tours led by students in the program are available at the teaching zoo if scheduled ahead of time; visitors may also take a self-guided tours.

== History ==
The Santa Fe College Teaching Zoo was established in 1970. It comprises 10 acres (4.0 ha) of forested land on the west side of the Santa Fe College main campus. The zoo has been accredited by the AZA since 2000 and undergoes its accreditation process every five years. Most recently accredited by AZA in September 2026, the Teaching Zoo will undergo its next accreditation process in 2031.

== Animals ==
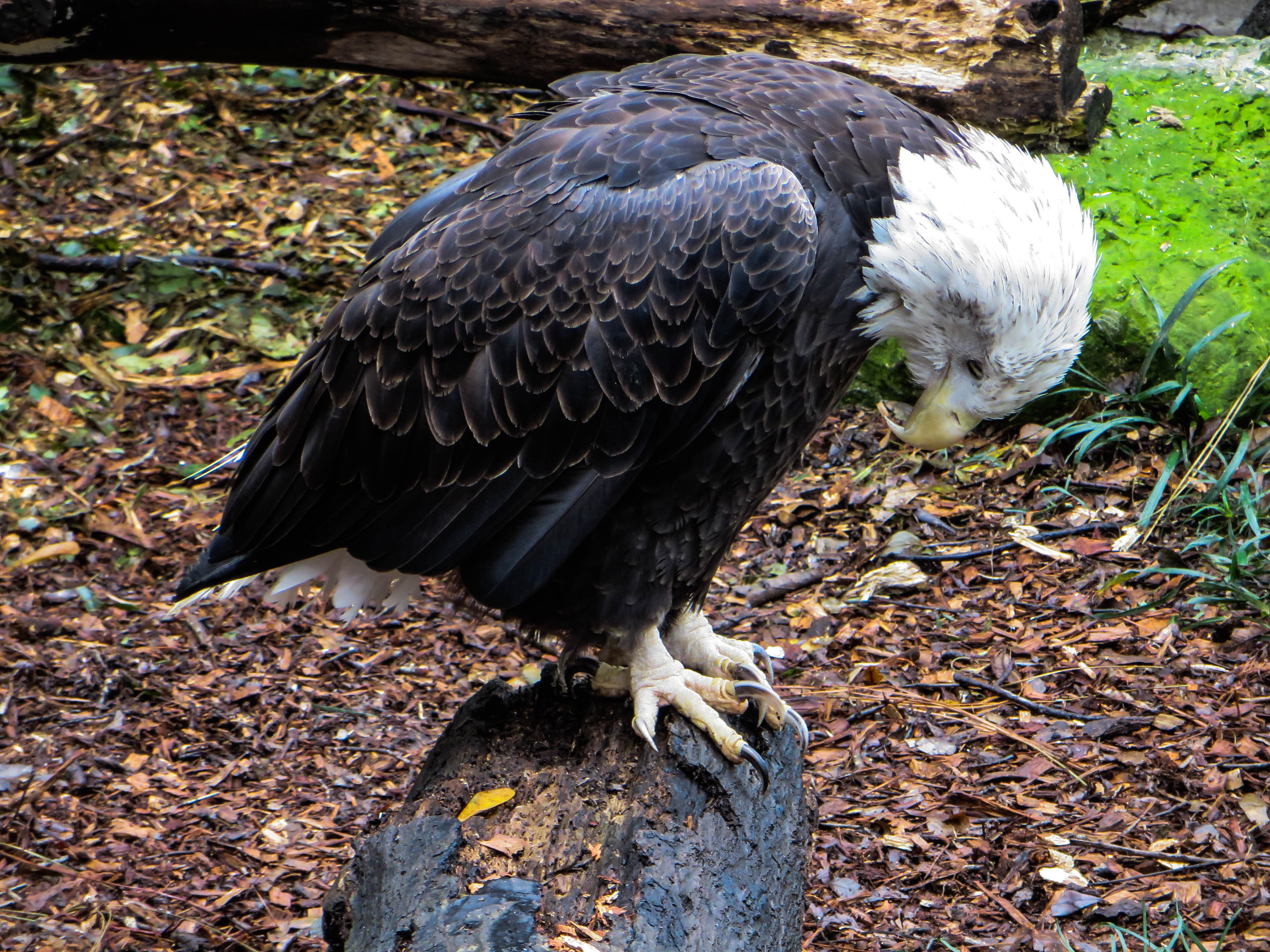
Bald eagle at the zoo

External videos
- Santa Fe College Teaching Zoo Tour – an introductory tour of the facility with highlights of the zookeeper program and the different animals onsite

The zoo is home to more than 100 individual animals representing more than 50 species, including mammals, reptiles, amphibians, and birds.

List of animals

Mammals
- Caracal
- Common squirrel monkey
- Key deer
- Lar gibbon
- Pineywoods cattle
- Red ruffed lemur
- Southern three-banded armadillo
- White-throated capuchin

Herptiles

- American alligator
- Asian forest tortoise
- Ball python
- Common musk turtle
- Corn snake
- Diamondback terrapin
- Dusky pygmy rattlesnake
- Eastern copperhead
- Eastern indigo snake
- European glass lizard
- False water cobra
- Florida box turtle
- Florida pine snake
- Galápagos tortoise
- Gila monster
- Gopher tortoise
- Green and black poison dart frog
- Leopard gecko
- Leopard tortoise
- Prehensile-tailed skink
- Red-footed tortoise
- Sinaloan milk snake
- Tokay gecko

Birds

- American white ibis
- Bald eagle
- Barred owl
- Blue-winged teal
- Cattle egret
- Emu
- Fulvous whistling duck
- Golden parakeet
- Guam rail
- Guinea turaco
- Grey crowned crane
- Hawk-headed parrot
- Indian peafowl
- Laughing kookaburra
- Redhead
- Roseate spoonbill
- Turkey vulture

The zoo also participates in several AZA Species Survival Plan (SSP) programs including: white-handed gibbons, red ruffed lemurs, Guianan squirrel monkeys, caracals, golden conures, Eastern indigo snakes, grey crowned cranes, and Guam rails.

== Zoo Animal Technology Program ==
Students spend 5 semesters learning about animal husbandry, breeding, nutrition, medical care, physiology, taxonomic relationships, conservation, enclosure construction, proper zoo sanitation, and other topics through classwork and actual work as keepers in the zoo. Students of the Zoo Animal Technology Program are known as Zooies and there is a student chapter of the American Association of Zoo Keepers. The Zoo Animal Technology Program degree has over 200 students enrolled in the program. Since 2023 the Teaching Zoo has offered a four year degree in Organizational Management that has online and hybrid options.

== Events ==
The zoo is a popular destination for both local residents and tourists. The zoo hosts several events open to the public throughout the year, including Party for the Planet (celebrating Earth Day) and "Boo at the Zoo" (BATZ) Halloween festival.
