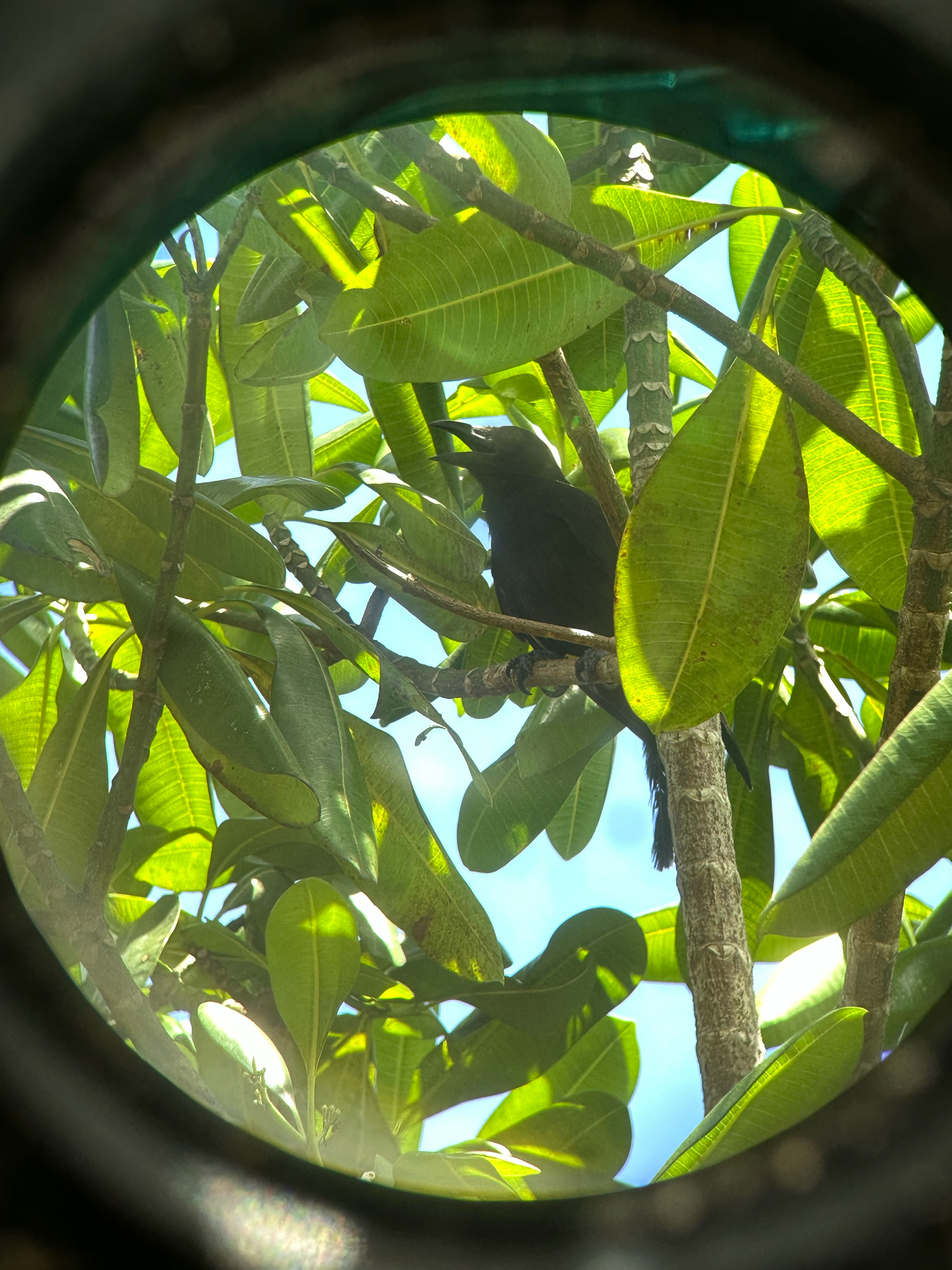

Conservation status
- Critically Endangered (IUCN 3.1)

Scientific classification
- Kingdom: Animalia
- Phylum: Chordata
- Class: Aves
- Order: Passeriformes
- Family: Corvidae
- Genus: Corvus
- Species: C. kubaryi

Binomial name
- Corvus kubaryi Reichenow, 1885

= Mariana crow =

Species of bird

The Mariana crow (Corvus kubaryi) (Chamorro: åga) is a species of the crow family from the tropical Western Pacific. It is a glossy black bird about 15 inches (38 cm) long and known only from the islands of Guam and Rota.

It is a rare bird which has steadily declined in numbers since the 1960s. On Guam there are no remaining native Mariana crows, the population having been wiped out by the introduction of the brown tree snake. On Rota the population has declined to fewer than 200 individuals, the main threats here being the reduction of suitable habitat because of development and predation. Despite translocations from Rota to the Guam National Wildlife Refuge in the late 1990s and early 2000s, by 2011 the Mariana Crow was extirpated from Guam. Current conservation efforts on Rota include habitat protection, and a captive rear-and-release program. The International Union for Conservation of Nature has rated the bird as being "critically endangered".

== Description ==
The Mariana crow is a small black crow with a bluish-black gloss on its tail, and a greenish-black gloss on its back, underparts, head, and wings. In general, females are smaller than males. An adult weighs about 9 ounces (260 g) and is about 15 inches (38 cm) long.

The Mariana crow has a variety of vocalizations, including two locational calls used to maintain contact between pairs, family members and flock mates. These locational calls are either a high-pitched series of one to three caw or hi sounds, or a series of longer caw sounds with a nasal aaa element to the call; the latter call may be used exclusively between mated pairs. Alarm calls are a rapid series of sharp caws. The birds also make a variety of squalling, guttural sounds, which may be done either quietly or excitedly.

== Distribution and ecology ==
The Mariana crow inhabits second growth and mature forests, as well as coastal strand vegetation, but nests only in native limestone forest. It preferentially nests in the crowns of two canopy-emergent tree species: yoga tree (Elaeocarpus joga) and the fig Ficus prolixa. The crow currently is only found on the island of Rota. It disappeared from southern Guam in the 1960s and from central Guam in the 1970s, mostly inhabiting Andersen Air Force Base. Its population on Rota has also decreased.

=== Diet ===
Extremely versatile, the Mariana crow is an opportunistic omnivore, feeding on insects, lizards, other birds' eggs, hermit crabs, fruits, and seeds.

=== Nesting ===
The Mariana crow begins nesting as early as July and as late as May. The nest is a large, cupped platform of small sticks, lined with leaf fibers. Clutch size varies from 1 to 4 eggs, and both parents incubate the eggs, brood the chicks, and care for the juveniles even after they fledge. Parental care has been known to range from 5 to 18 months, and juveniles may take as long as 3 years before entering the adult breeding cycle.

== Status and conservation ==
On Guam, the Mariana crow's decline is primarily due to predation by the introduced brown tree snake (Boiga irregularis). In spite of protection of nesting-sites by electrical tree barriers, the remaining birds are considered to be reproductively senescent. On Rota, many other threats endanger the crow, including homestead development, resort and golf-course construction, agricultural settlement, nest-predation from introduced rats, the Mariana monitor lizard (Varanus tsukamotoi), typhoons, predation from feral cats, disease, and competition with the black drongo (Dicrurus macrocercus). More recently, the brown tree snake has also been detected on Rota, likely leading to serious declines in the Mariana crow population there if the snake population establishes itself. The Mariana crow is also persecuted by residents of both islands who see it as an obstacle to development.

In 1993, a National Wildlife Refuge was established on Guam to preserve the remaining forest, and birds were translocated from Rota. Biologically controlling the brown tree snake is also being discussed.

Crows were transported from Rota to Guam in 2003 to assist conservation efforts though this may have had the unintended side effect of decreasing genetic variation within the species as tests have shown the Rota population is less diverse than the Guam.

Formerly classified as an endangered species by the IUCN, it was suspected to be rarer than generally assumed. Following the evaluation of its status, this was found to be correct, and it is consequently uplisted to critically endangered status in 2008 as it is in immediate danger of extinction, numbering so few birds that it could be entirely wiped out by a single catastrophic event such as an epidemic of West Nile virus.

== See also ==
- List of birds of Guam
- List of birds of the Northern Mariana Islands
