= List of birds of Guam =

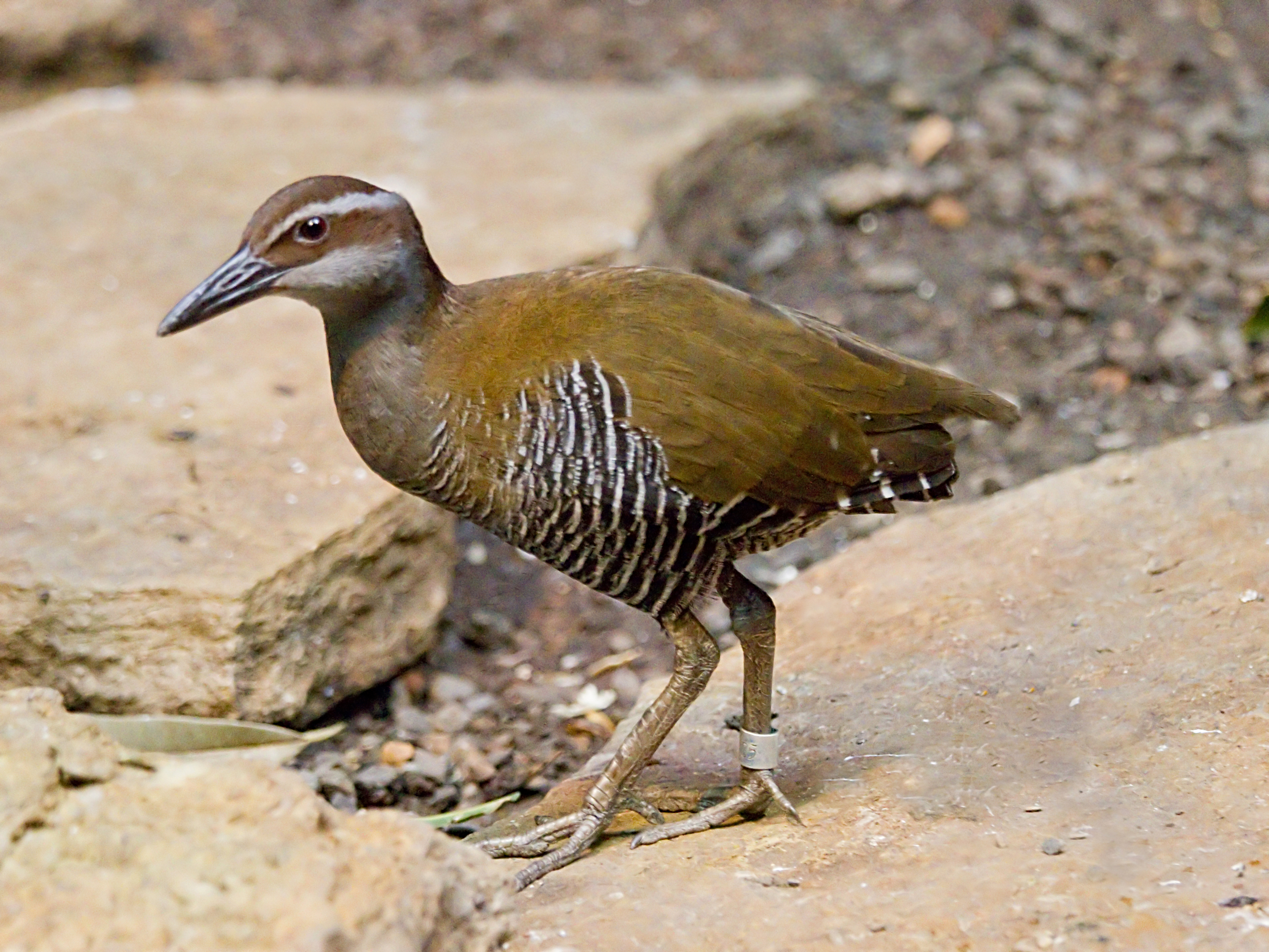
Guam rail

This is a list of the bird species recorded in Guam. The avifauna of Guam includes a total of 146 species as of August 2021, according to Bird Checklists of the World. Of them, eight have been introduced by humans and 32 are rare or accidental. 3 species are endemic, of which one is extinct and two are extinct in the wild though their reintroductions are either in progress or planned. Five species have been extirpated.

This list's taxonomic treatment (designation and sequence of orders, families and species) and nomenclature (English and scientific names) are those of The Clements Checklist of Birds of the World, 2022 edition.

The following tags have been used to highlight several categories of occurrence.

- (A) Accidental – a species that rarely or accidentally occurs in Guam
- (End) Endemic – a species entirely confined to Guam in its natural distribution
- (E) Extinct – a recent bird that no longer exists
- (EW) Extinct in the wild – a species which only exists in captive breeding programs
- (I) Introduced – a species introduced to Guam as a consequence, direct or indirect, of human actions
- (Ex) Extirpated – a species that no longer occurs in Guam although populations exist elsewhere

== Ducks, geese, and waterfowl ==
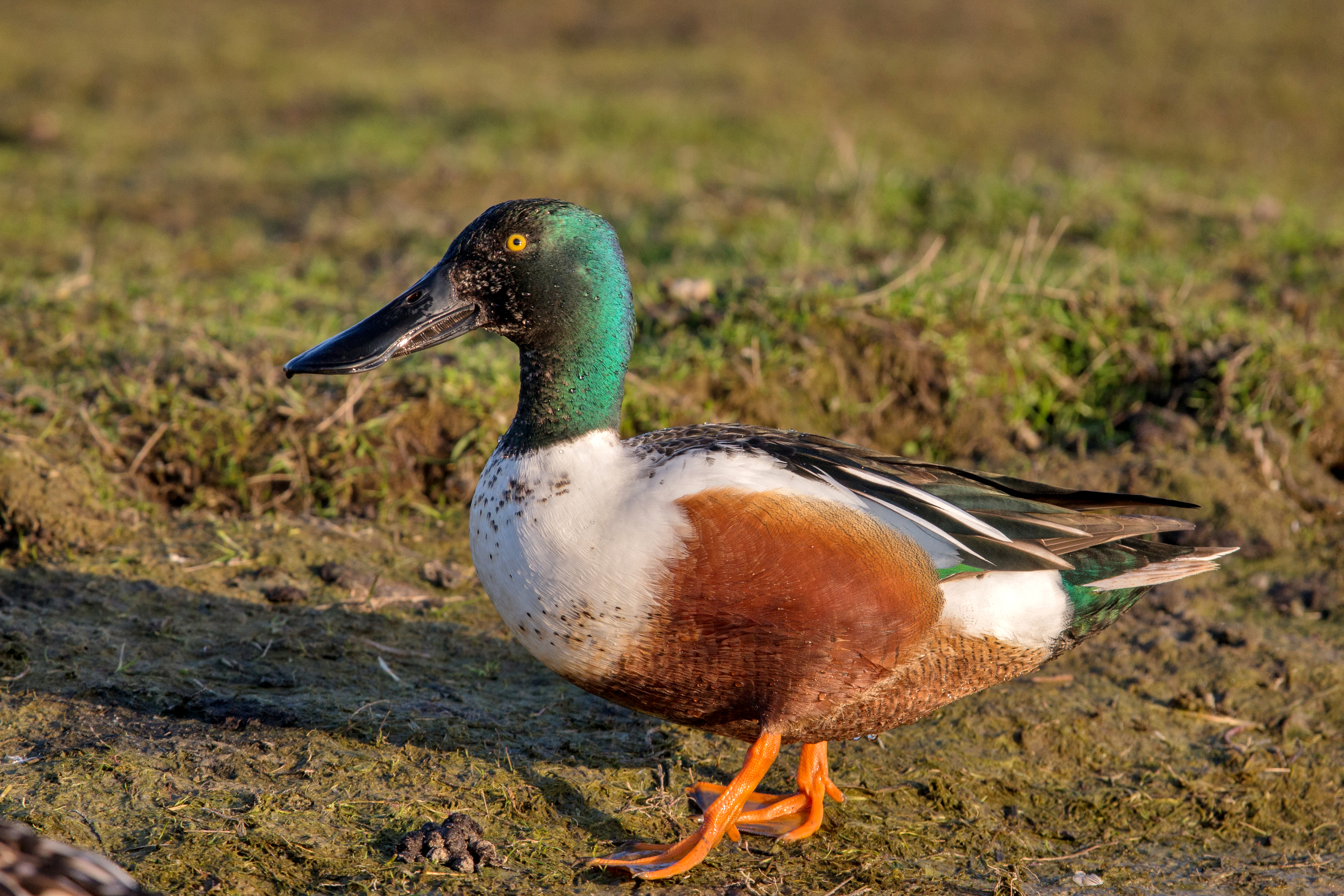
Northern shoveler

Order: Anseriformes Family: Anatidae

Anatidae includes the ducks and most duck-like waterfowl, such as geese and swans. These birds are adapted to an aquatic existence with webbed feet, flattened bills, and feathers that are excellent at shedding water due to an oily coating.

- Tundra swan, Cygnus columbianus (A)
- Garganey, Spatula querquedula (A)
- Northern shoveler, Spatula clypeata (A)
- Gadwall, Mareca strepera
- Eurasian wigeon, Mareca penelope
- American wigeon, Mareca americana
- Eastern spot-billed duck, Anas zonorhyncha (A)
- Mallard, Anas platyrhynchos
- Northern pintail, Anas acuta (A)
- Green-winged teal, Anas crecca
- Common pochard, Aythya ferina (A)
- Tufted duck, Aythya fuligula
- Greater scaup, Aythya marila (A)
- Surf scoter, Melanitta perspicillata (A)

== Megapodes ==
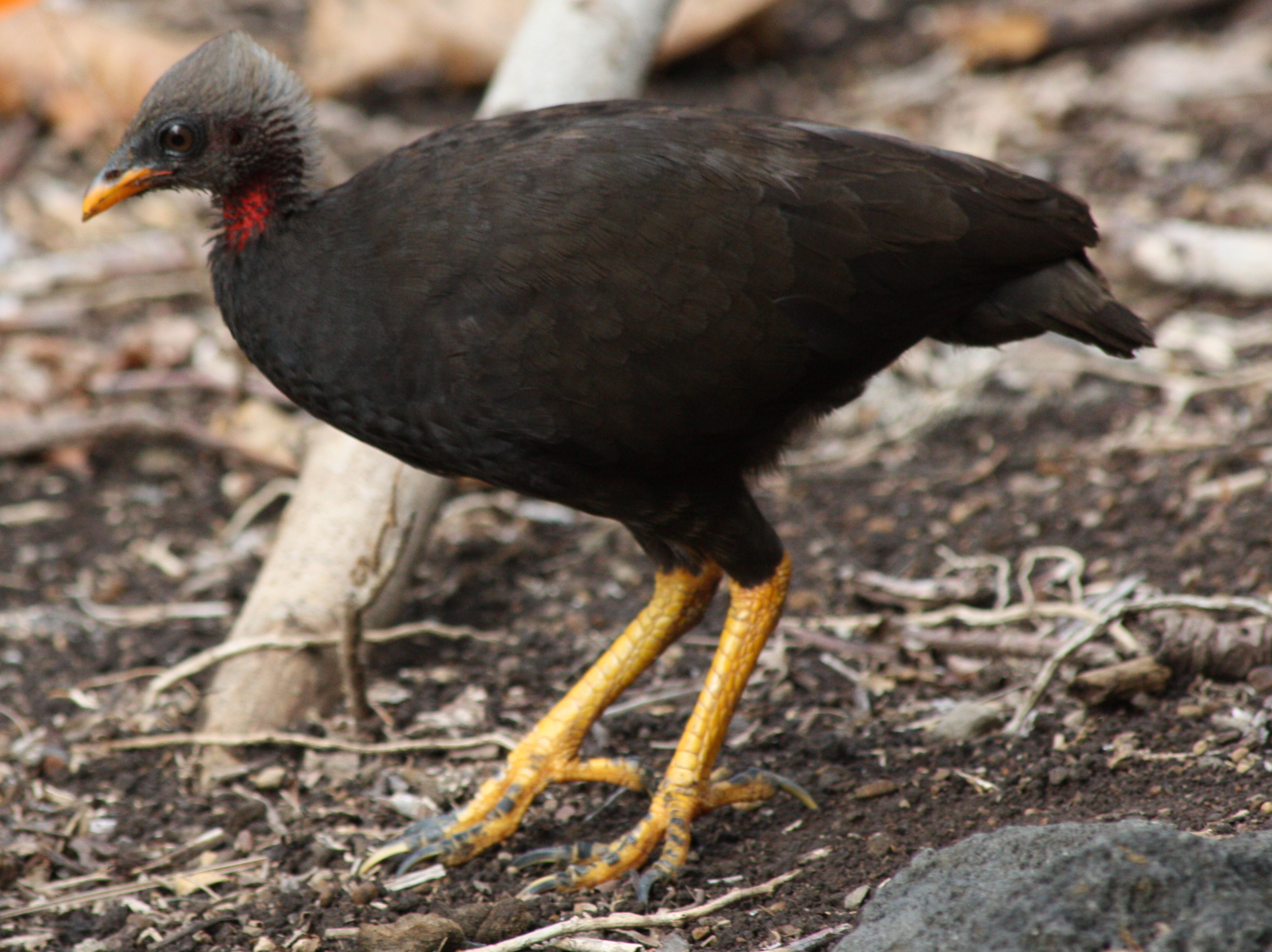
Micronesian scrubfowl

Order: Galliformes Family: Megapodiidae

The Megapodiidae are stocky, medium-large chicken-like birds with small heads and large feet. All but the malleefowl occupy jungle habitats and most have brown or black coloring.

- Micronesian scrubfowl, Megapodius laperouse (Ex)

== Pheasants, grouse, and allies ==
Order: Galliformes Family: Phasianidae

The Phasianidae are a family of terrestrial birds which consists of quails, partridges, snowcocks, francolins, spurfowls, tragopans, monals, pheasants, peafowls, and jungle fowls. In general, they are plump (although they vary in size) and have broad, relatively short wings.

- Blue-breasted quail, Coturnix chinensis (I)
- Black francolin, Francolinus francolinus (I)
- Red junglefowl, Gallus gallus (I)

== Pigeons and doves ==
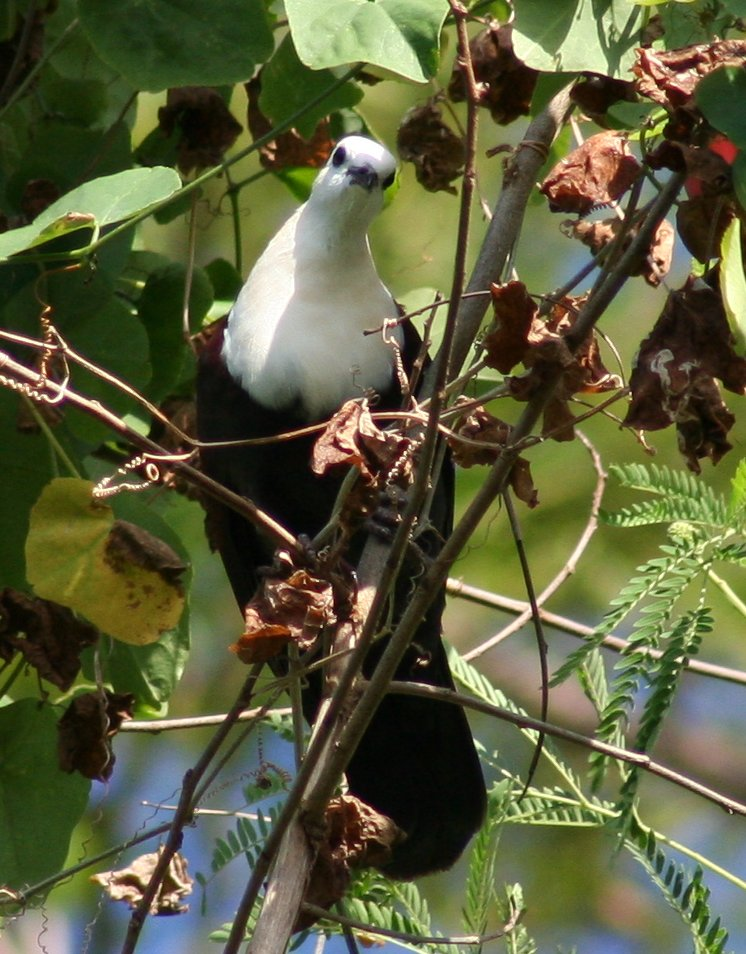
White-throated ground dove

Order: Columbiformes Family: Columbidae

Pigeons and doves are stout-bodied birds with short necks and short slender bills with a fleshy cere.

- Rock pigeon, Columba livia (I)
- Philippine collared-dove, Streptopelia dusumieri (I)
- White-throated ground dove, Alopecoenas xanthonurus
- Mariana fruit-dove, Ptilinopus roseicapilla (Ex)

== Cuckoos ==
Order: Cuculiformes Family: Cuculidae

The family Cuculidae includes cuckoos, roadrunners, and anis. These birds are of variable size with slender bodies, long tails, and strong legs.

- Chestnut-winged cuckoo, Clamator coromandus (A)
- Long-tailed koel, Urodynamis taitensis (A)

== Swifts ==
Order: Caprimulgiformes Family: Apodidae

Swifts are small birds which spend the majority of their lives flying. These birds have very short legs and never settle voluntarily on the ground, perching instead only on vertical surfaces. Many swifts have long swept-back wings which resemble a crescent or boomerang.

- White-throated needletail, Hirundapus caudacutus (A)
- Uniform swiftlet, Aerodramus vanikorensis
- Mariana swiftlet, Aerodramus bartschi
- Caroline Islands swiftlet, Aerodramus inquietus
- Pacific swift, Apus pacificus

== Rails, gallinules, and coots ==
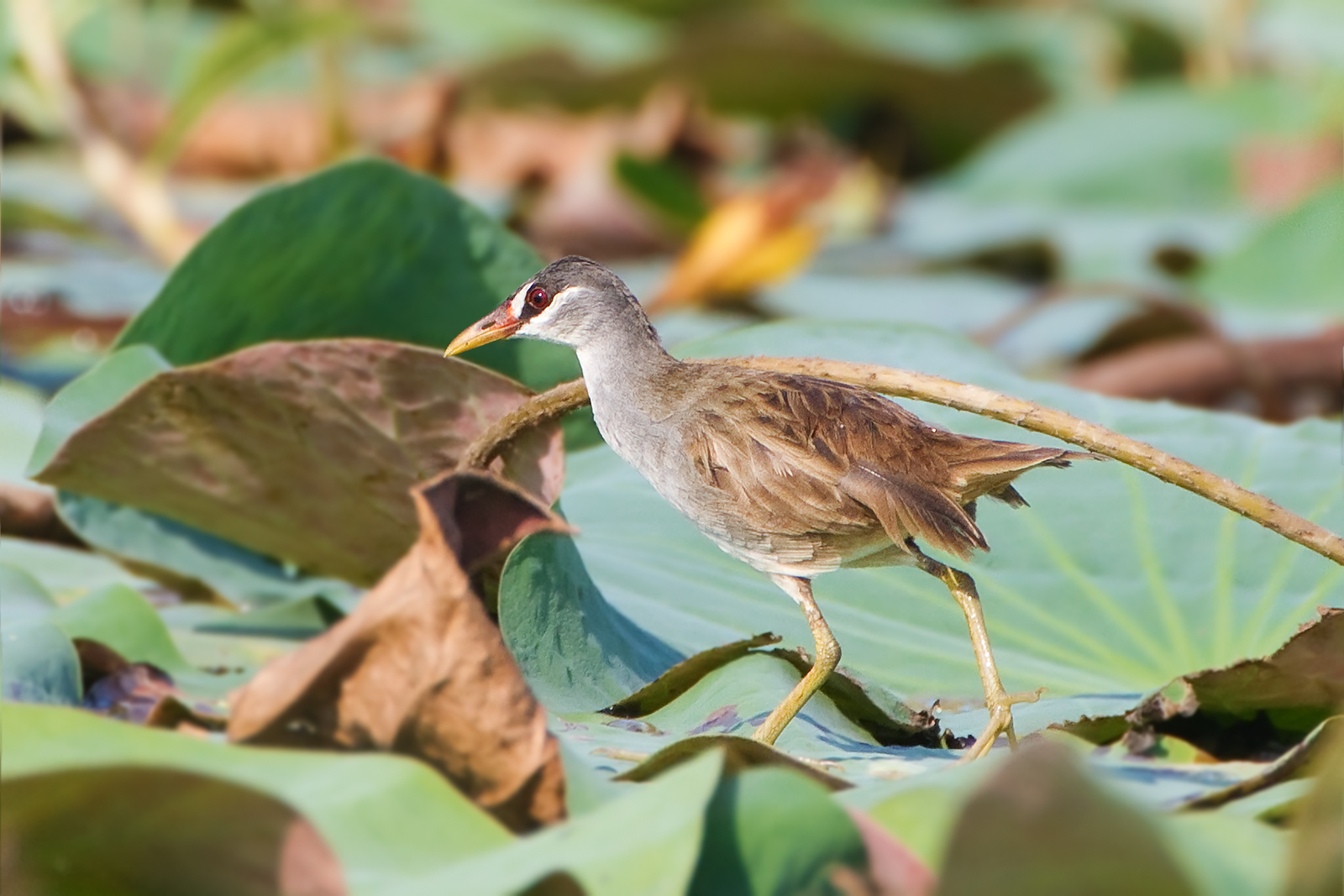
White-browed crake

Order: Gruiformes Family: Rallidae

Rallidae is a large family of small to medium-sized birds which includes the rails, crakes, coots, and gallinules. Typically they inhabit dense vegetation in damp environments near lakes, swamps, or rivers. In general they are shy and secretive birds, making them difficult to observe. Most species have strong legs and long toes which are well adapted to soft uneven surfaces. They tend to have short, rounded wings and to be weak fliers. The Guam rail was formerly extinct in the wild but has been reintroduced to Rota and Cocos Island near Guam.

- Guam rail, Gallirallus owstoni (End)
- Eurasian moorhen, Gallinula chloropus
- Eurasian coot, Fulica atra (A)
- White-browed crake, Poliolimnas cinereus (Ex)

== Stilts and avocets ==
Order: Charadriiformes Family: Recurvirostridae

Recurvirostridae is a family of large wading birds which includes the avocets and stilts. The stilts have extremely long legs and long, thin, straight bills.

- Black-winged stilt, Himantopus himantopus

== Oystercatchers ==
Order: Charadriiformes Family: Haematopodidae

The oystercatchers are large and noisy plover-like birds, with strong bills used for smashing or prising open molluscs.

- Eurasian oystercatcher, Haematopus ostralegus (A)

== Plovers and lapwings ==
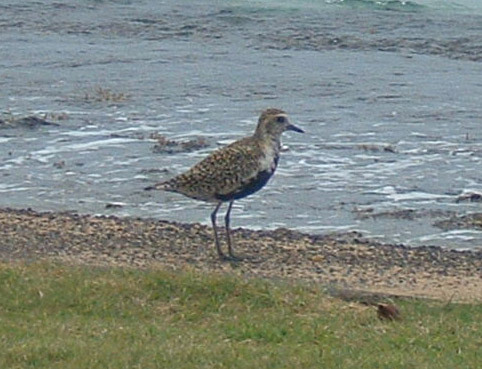
Pacific golden-plover

Order: Charadriiformes Family: Charadriidae

The family Charadriidae includes the plovers, dotterels, and lapwings. They are small to medium-sized birds with compact bodies, short thick necks, and long, usually pointed, wings. They are found in open country worldwide, mostly in habitats near water.

- Black-bellied plover, Pluvialis squatarola
- Pacific golden-plover, Pluvialis fulva
- Lesser sand-plover, Charadrius mongolus
- Greater sand-plover, Charadrius leschenaultii
- Kentish plover, Charadrius alexandrinus
- Common ringed plover, Charadrius hiaticula
- Little ringed plover, Charadrius dubius

== Sandpipers and allies ==
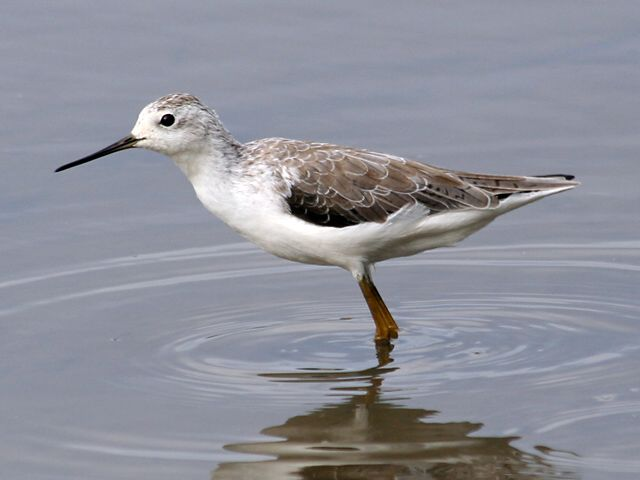
Common greenshank

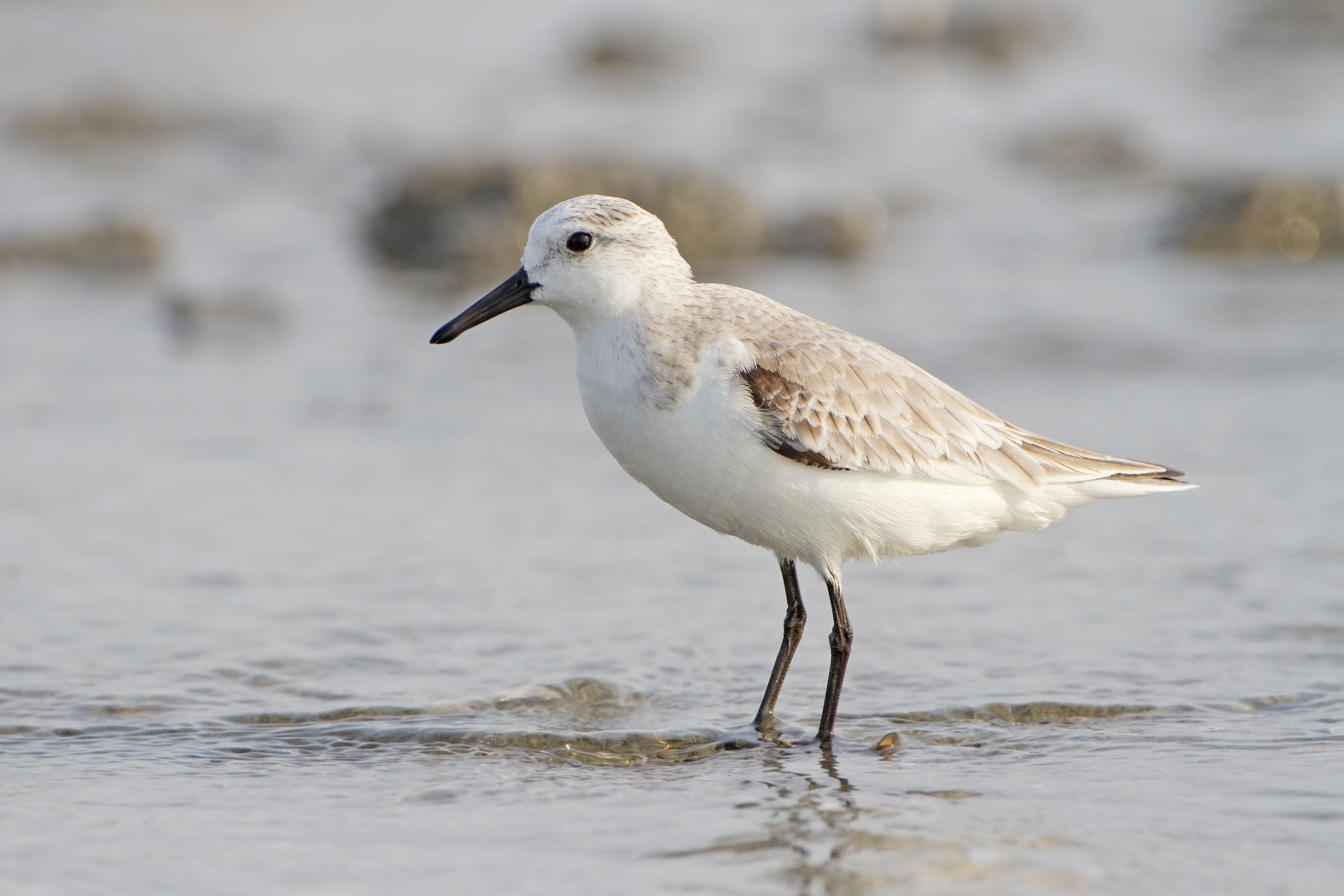
Sanderling

Order: Charadriiformes Family: Scolopacidae

Scolopacidae is a large diverse family of small to medium-sized shorebirds including the sandpipers, curlews, godwits, shanks, tattlers, woodcocks, snipes, dowitchers, and phalaropes. The majority of these species eat small invertebrates picked out of the mud or soil. Variation in length of legs and bills enables multiple species to feed in the same habitat, particularly on the coast, without direct competition for food.

- Bristle-thighed curlew, Numenius tahitiensis
- Whimbrel, Numenius phaeopus
- Little curlew, Numenius minutus
- Far Eastern curlew, Numenius madagascariensis
- Eurasian curlew, Numenius arquata
- Bar-tailed godwit, Limosa lapponica
- Black-tailed godwit, Limosa limosa
- Ruddy turnstone, Arenaria interpres
- Great knot, Calidris tenuirostris
- Red knot, Calidris canutus (A)
- Ruff, Calidris pugnax
- Sharp-tailed sandpiper, Calidris acuminata
- Curlew sandpiper, Calidris ferruginea
- Temminck's stint, Calidris temminckii (A)
- Long-toed stint, Calidris subminuta
- Red-necked stint, Calidris ruficollis
- Sanderling, Calidris alba
- Dunlin, Calidris alpina
- Pectoral sandpiper, Calidris melanotos
- Long-billed dowitcher, Limnodromus scolopaceus
- Latham's snipe, Gallinago hardwickii (A)
- Common snipe, Gallinago gallinago
- Swinhoe's snipe, Gallinago megala
- Terek sandpiper, Xenus cinereus
- Wilson's phalarope, Phalaropus tricolor (A)
- Common sandpiper, Actitis hypoleucos
- Gray-tailed tattler, Tringa brevipes
- Wandering tattler, Tringa incana
- Common greenshank, Tringa nebularia
- Marsh sandpiper, Tringa stagnatilis
- Wood sandpiper, Tringa glareola
- Common redshank, Tringa totanus

== Pratincoles and coursers ==
Order: Charadriiformes Family: Glareolidae

The pratincoles have short legs, very long pointed wings, and long forked tails. Their most unusual feature for birds classed as waders is that they typically hunt their insect prey on the wing like swallows.

- Oriental pratincole, Glareola maldivarum

== Gulls, terns, and skimmers ==
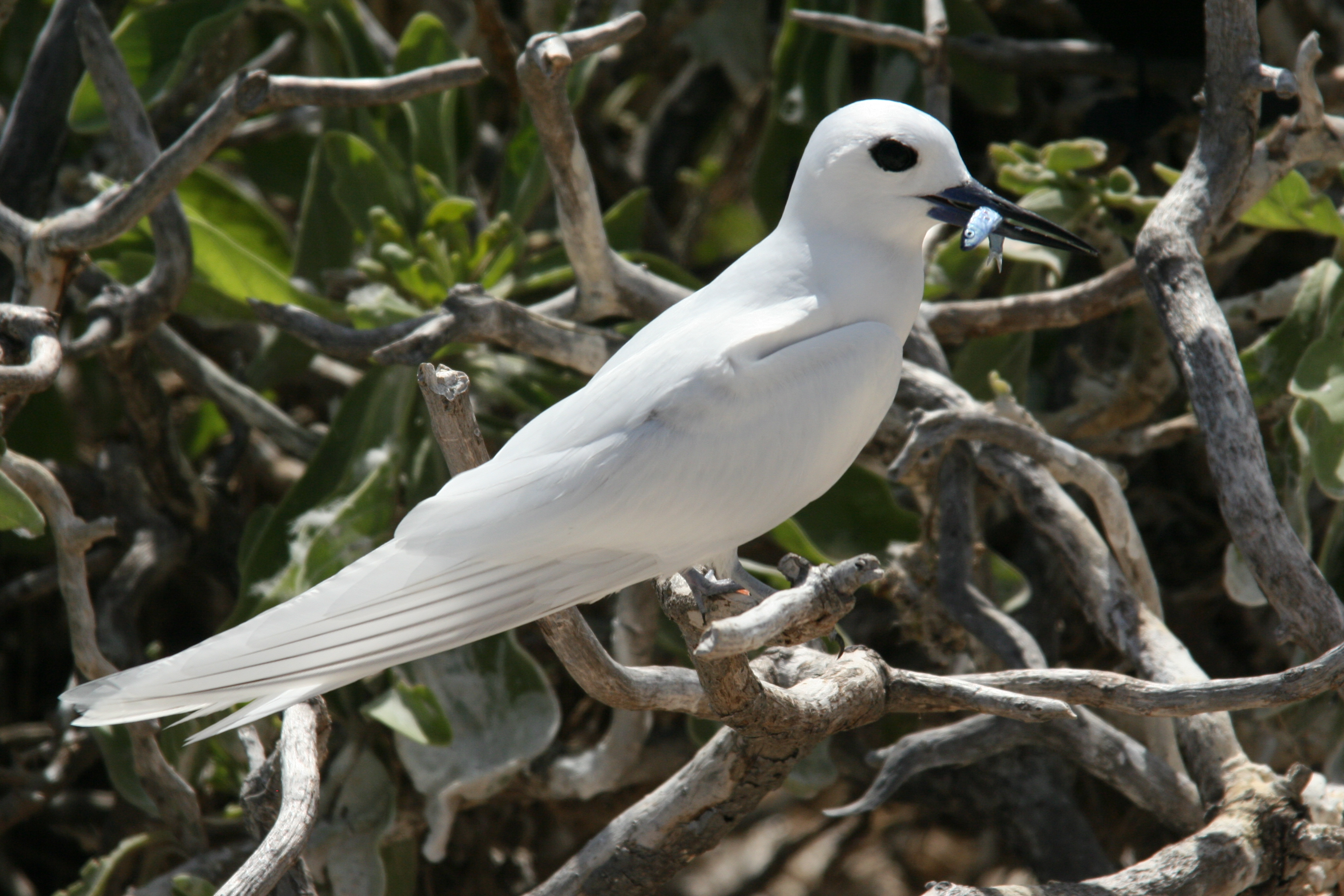
White tern

Order: Charadriiformes Family: Laridae

Laridae is a family of medium to large seabirds, the gulls, terns, and skimmers. Gulls are typically gray or white, often with black markings on the head or wings. They have stout, longish bills and webbed feet. Terns are a group of generally medium to large seabirds typically with gray or white plumage, often with black markings on the head. Most terns hunt fish by diving but some pick insects off the surface of fresh water. Terns are generally long-lived birds, with several species known to live in excess of 30 years.

- Black-headed gull, Chroicocephalus ridibundus
- Laughing gull, Leucophaeus atricilla (A)
- Slaty-backed gull, Larus schistisagus (A)
- Brown noddy, Anous stolidus
- Black noddy, Anous minutus
- White tern, Gygis alba
- Sooty tern, Onychoprion fuscatus
- Little tern, Sternula albifrons
- Gull-billed tern, Gelochelidon nilotica (A)
- White-winged tern, Chlidonias leucopterus
- Whiskered tern, Chlidonias hybrida
- Black-naped tern, Sterna sumatrana
- Common tern, Sterna hirundo
- Great crested tern, Thalasseus bergii

== Tropicbirds ==
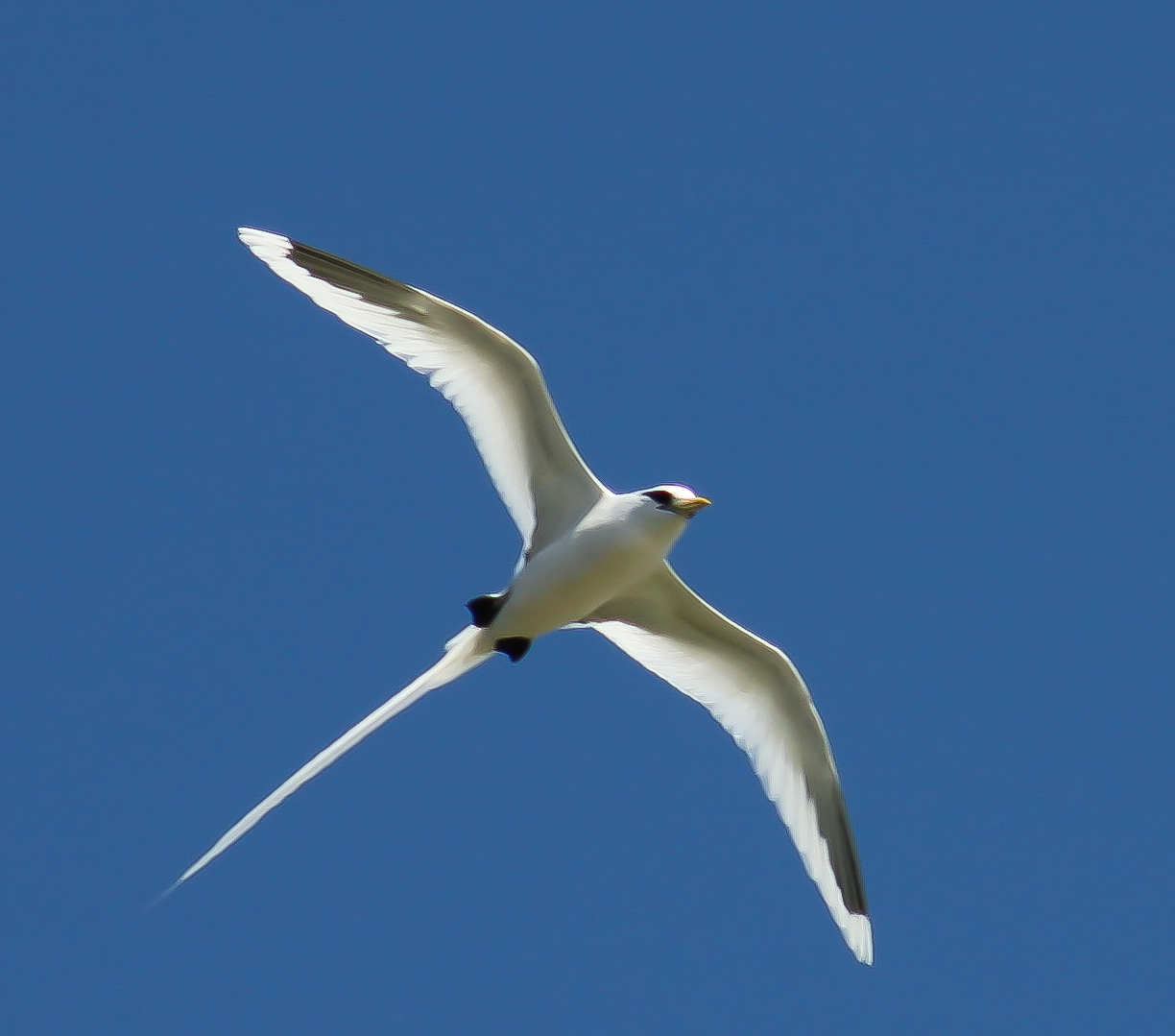
White-tailed tropicbird

Order: Phaethontiformes Family: Phaethontidae

Tropicbirds are slender white birds of tropical oceans, with exceptionally long central tail feathers. Their heads and long wings have black markings.

- White-tailed tropicbird, Phaethon lepturus
- Red-tailed tropicbird, Phaethon rubricauda

== Northern storm-petrels ==
Order: Procellariiformes Family: Hydrobatidae

The northern storm-petrels are relatives of the petrels and are the smallest seabirds. They feed on planktonic crustaceans and small fish picked from the surface, typically while hovering. The flight is fluttering and sometimes bat-like.

- Leach's storm-petrel, Hydrobates leucorhous
- Matsudaira's storm-petrel, Hydrobates matsudairae

== Shearwaters and petrels ==
Order: Procellariiformes Family: Procellariidae

The procellariids are the main group of medium-sized "true petrels", characterized by united nostrils with medium septum and a long outer functional primary.

- Juan Fernandez petrel, Pterodroma externa
- Tahiti petrel, Pseudobulweria rostrata
- Streaked Shearwater, Calonectris leucomelas
- Wedge-tailed shearwater, Ardenna pacificus
- Short-tailed shearwater, Ardenna tenuirostris
- Newell's shearwater, Puffinus newelli (A)
- Tropical shearwater, Puffinus bailloni

== Frigatebirds ==
Order: Suliformes Family: Fregatidae

Frigatebirds are large seabirds usually found over tropical oceans. They are large, black and white, or completely black, with long wings and deeply forked tails. The males have colored inflatable throat pouches. They do not swim or walk and cannot take off from a flat surface. Having the largest wingspan-to-body-weight ratio of any bird, they are essentially aerial, able to stay aloft for more than a week.

- Great frigatebird, Fregata minor

== Boobies and gannets ==
Order: Suliformes Family: Sulidae

The sulids comprise the gannets and boobies. Both groups are medium to large coastal seabirds that plunge-dive for fish.

- Masked booby, Sula dactylatra
- Brown booby, Sula leucogaster
- Red-footed booby, Sula sula

== Herons, egrets, and bitterns ==
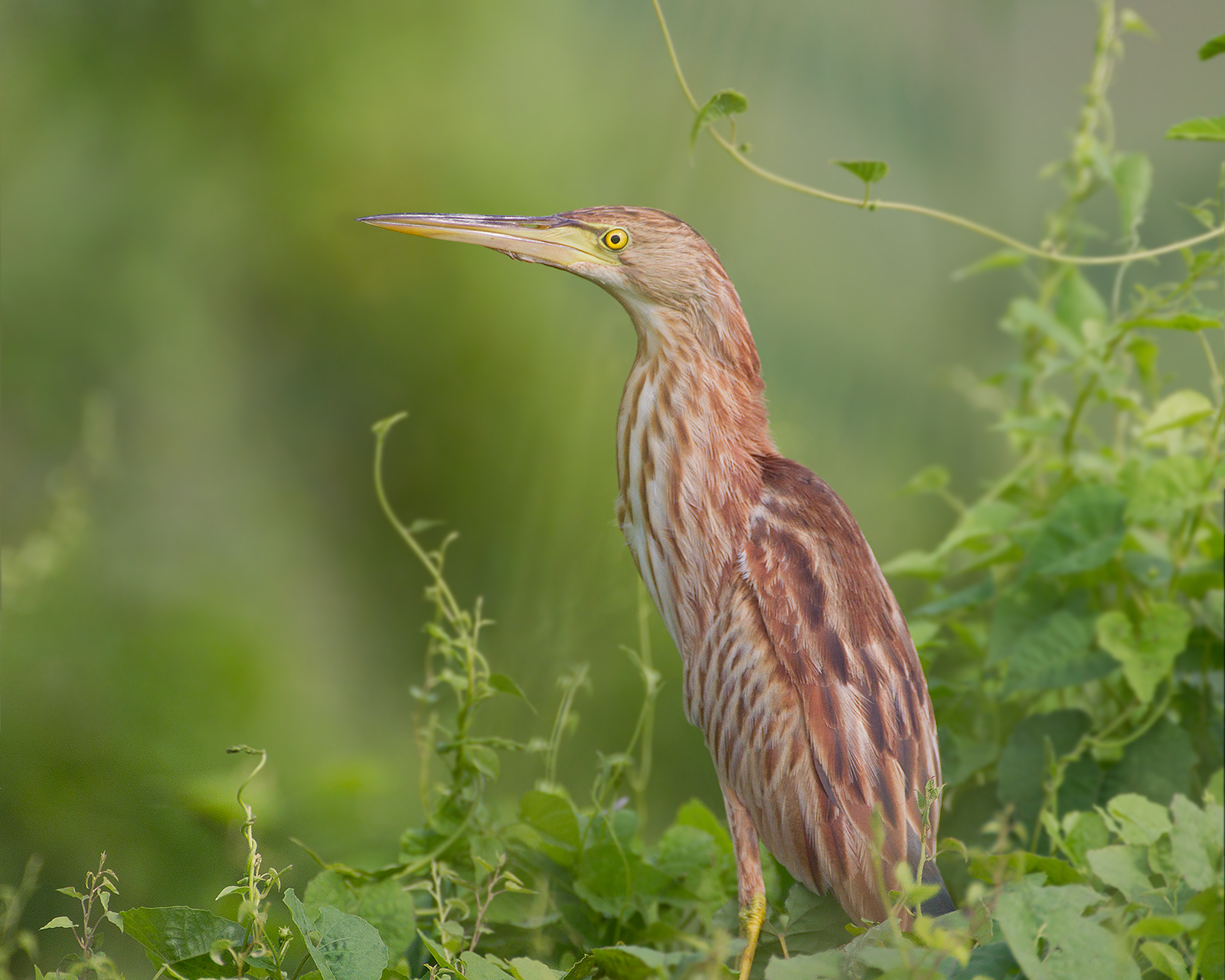
Yellow bittern

Order: Pelecaniformes Family: Ardeidae

The family Ardeidae contains the bitterns, herons, and egrets. Herons and egrets are medium to large wading birds with long necks and legs. Bitterns tend to be shorter necked and more wary. Members of Ardeidae fly with their necks retracted, unlike other long-necked birds such as storks, ibises, and spoonbills.

- Yellow bittern, Botaurus sinensis
- Black bittern, Botaurus flavicollis (A)
- Gray heron, Ardea cinerea
- Great egret, Ardea alba
- Intermediate egret, Ardea intermedia
- Little egret, Egretta garzetta
- Pacific reef-heron, Egretta sacra
- Cattle egret, Bubulcus ibis
- Chinese pond-heron, Ardeola bacchus (A)
- Striated heron, Butorides striata
- Black-crowned night-heron, Nycticorax nycticorax

== Osprey ==
Order: Accipitriformes Family: Pandionidae

The family Pandionidae contains only one species, the osprey. The osprey is a medium-large raptor which is a specialist fish-eater with a worldwide distribution.

- Osprey, Pandion haliaetus

== Hawks, eagles, and kites ==
Order: Accipitriformes Family: Accipitridae

Accipitridae is a family of birds of prey which includes hawks, eagles, kites, harriers, and Old World vultures. These birds have powerful hooked beaks for tearing flesh from their prey, strong legs, powerful talons, and keen eyesight.

- Gray-faced buzzard, Butastur indicus (A)
- Chinese goshawk, Accipiter soloensis
- Black kite, Milvus migrans

== Owls ==
Order: Strigiformes Family: Strigidae

The typical owls are small to large solitary nocturnal birds of prey. They have large forward-facing eyes and ears, a hawk-like beak and a conspicuous circle of feathers around each eye called a facial disk.

- Short-eared owl, Asio flammeus

== Kingfishers ==
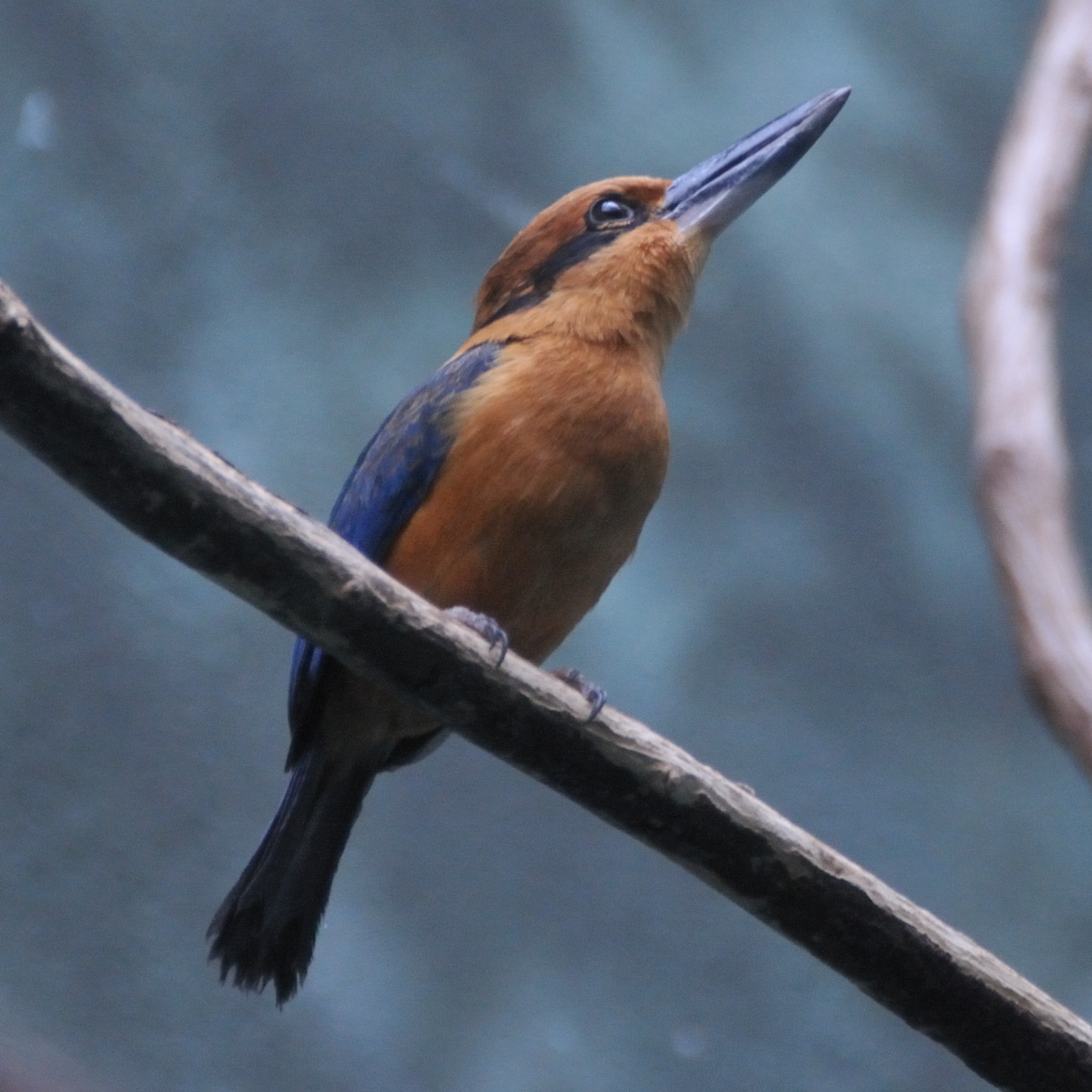
Guam kingfisher

Order: Coraciiformes Family: Alcedinidae

Kingfishers are medium-sized birds with large heads, long pointed bills, short legs and stubby tails. An attempt to reintroduce the Guam kingfisher is in the planning stage as of early 2020.

- Common kingfisher, Alcedo atthis (A)
- Guam kingfisher, Todirhamphus cinnamominus (End) (EW)
- Mariana kingfisher, Todirhamphus albicilla (A)
- Belted kingfisher, Megaceryle alcyon (A)

== Rollers ==
Order: Coraciiformes Family: Coraciidae

Rollers resemble crows in size and build, but are more closely related to the kingfishers and bee-eaters. They share the colorful appearance of those groups with blues and browns predominating.

- Dollarbird, Eurystomus orientalis (A)

== Falcons and caracaras ==
Order: Falconiformes Family: Falconidae

Falconidae is a family of diurnal birds of prey. They differ from hawks, eagles, and kites in that they kill with their beaks instead of their talons.

- Eurasian kestrel, Falco tinnunculus
- Peregrine falcon, Falco peregrinus

== Honeyeaters ==
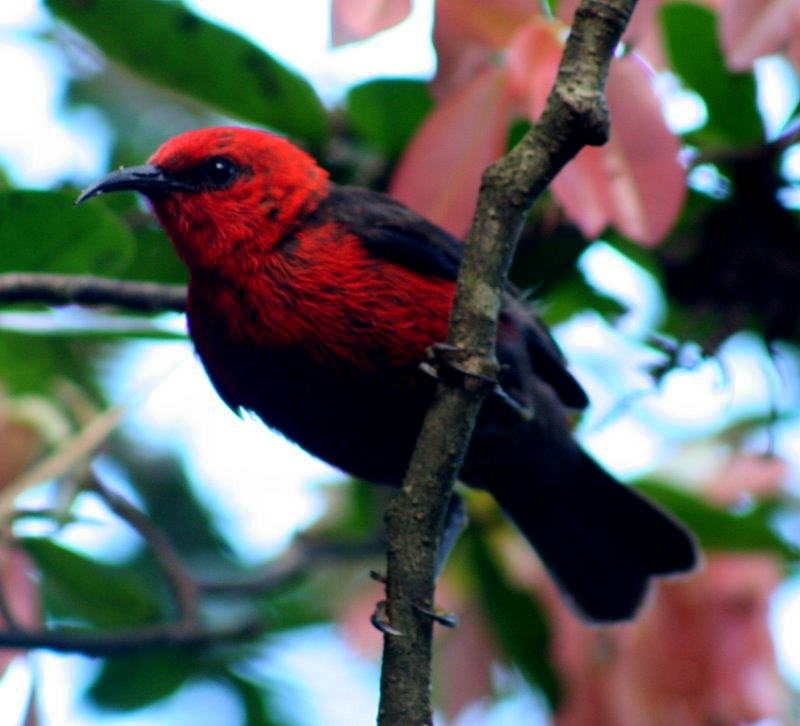
Micronesian myzomela

Order: Passeriformes Family: Meliphagidae

The honeyeaters are a large and diverse family of small to medium-sized birds most common in Australia and New Guinea. They are nectar feeders and closely resemble other nectar-feeding passerines.

- Micronesian myzomela, Myzomela rubratra (Ex)

== Fantails ==
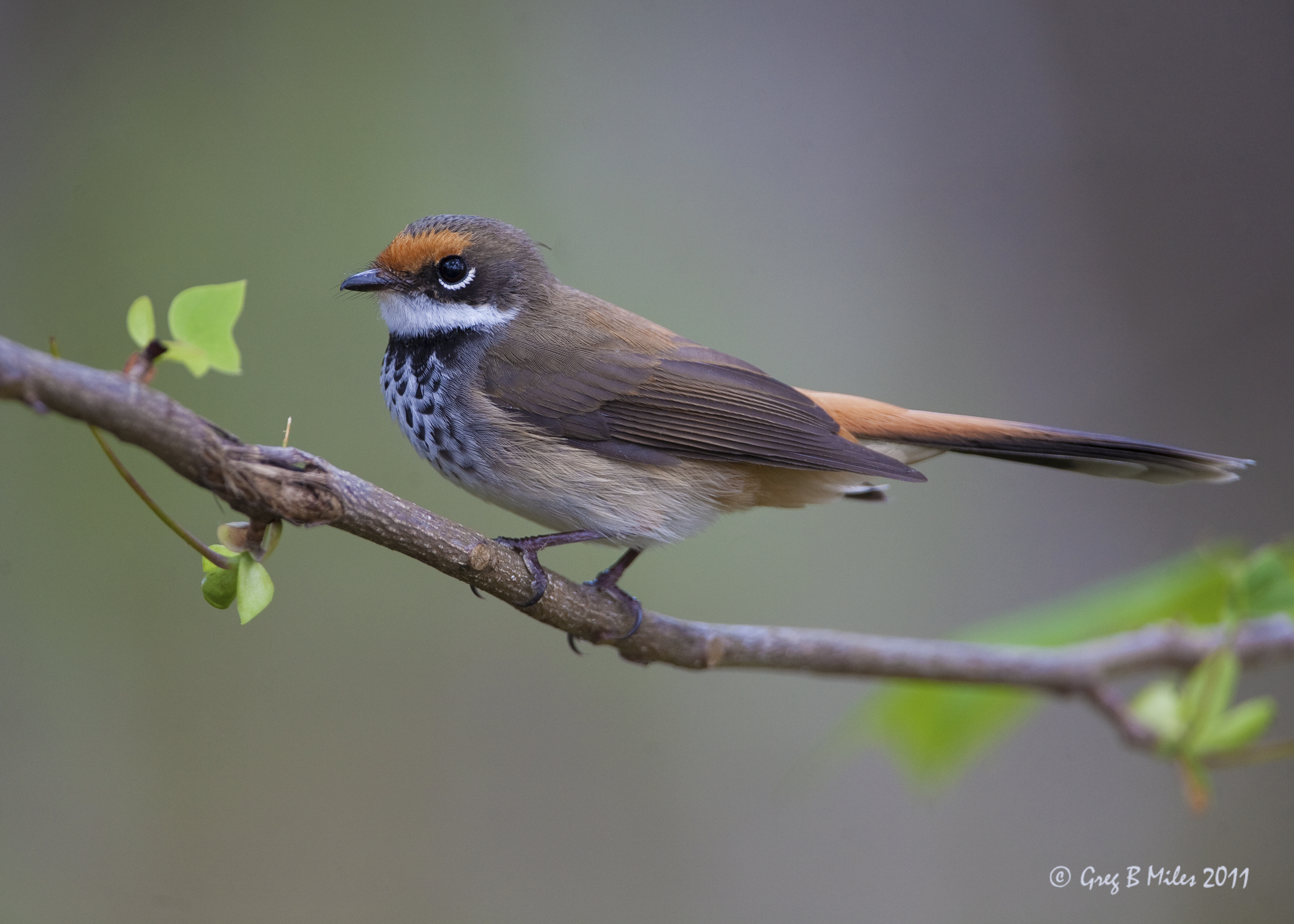
Rufous fantail

Order: Passeriformes Family: Rhipiduridae

The fantails are small insectivorous birds which are specialist aerial feeders.

- Rufous fantail, Rhipidura rufifrons (Ex)

== Drongos ==
Order: Passeriformes Family: Dicruridae

The drongos are mostly black or dark gray in color, sometimes with metallic tints. They have long forked tails, and some Asian species have elaborate tail decorations. They have short legs and sit very upright when perched, like a shrike. They flycatch or take prey from the ground.

- Black drongo, Dicrurus macrocercus (I)

== Monarch flycatchers ==
Order: Passeriformes Family: Monarchidae

The monarch flycatchers are small to medium-sized insectivorous passerines which hunt by flycatching.

- Guam flycatcher, Myiagra freycineti (E)

== Crows, jays, and magpies ==
Order: Passeriformes Family: Corvidae

The family Corvidae includes crows, ravens, jays, choughs, magpies, treepies, nutcrackers, and ground jays. Corvids are above average in size among the Passeriformes, and some of the larger species show high levels of intelligence.

- Mariana crow, Corvus kubaryi

== Reed warblers and allies ==
Order: Passeriformes Family: Acrocephalidae

The family Acrocephalidae is a group of small insectivorous passerine birds. Most are of generally undistinguished appearance, but many have distinctive songs.

- Nightingale reed warbler, Acrocephalus luscinia (E)

== Swallows ==
Order: Passeriformes Family: Hirundinidae

The family Hirundinidae is adapted to aerial feeding. They have a slender streamlined body, long pointed wings, and a short bill with a wide gape. The feet are adapted to perching rather than walking, and the front toes are partially joined at the base.

- Barn swallow, Hirundo rustica

== White-eyes ==
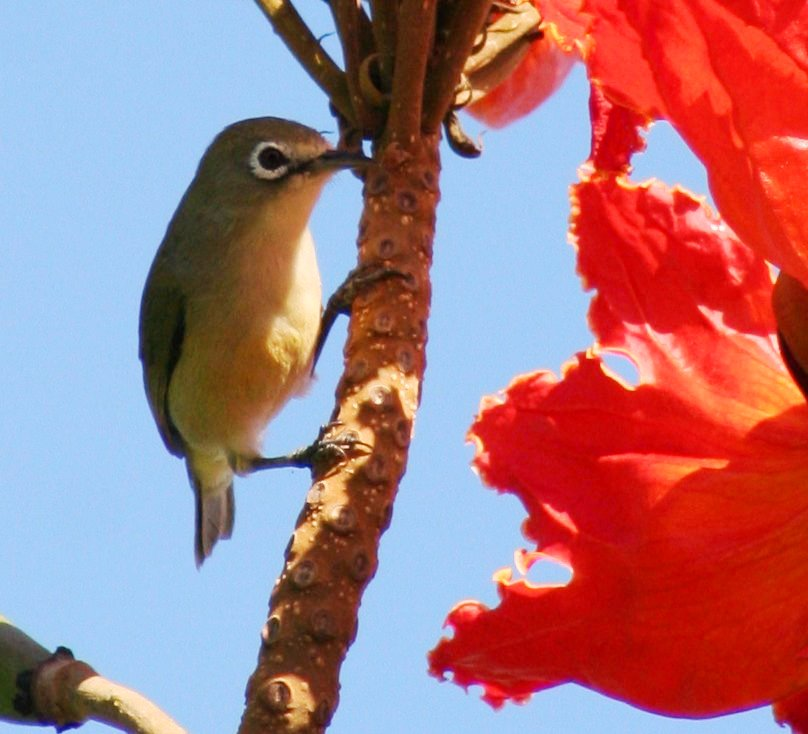
Bridled white-eye

Order: Passeriformes Family: Zosteropidae

The white-eyes are small and mostly undistinguished, their plumage above being generally some dull color like greenish-olive, but some species have a white or bright yellow throat, breast, or lower parts, and several have buff flanks. As their name suggests, many species have a white ring around each eye.

- Bridled white-eye, Zosterops conspicillatus (Ex)
- Rota white-eye, Zosterops rotensis (End)

== Starlings ==
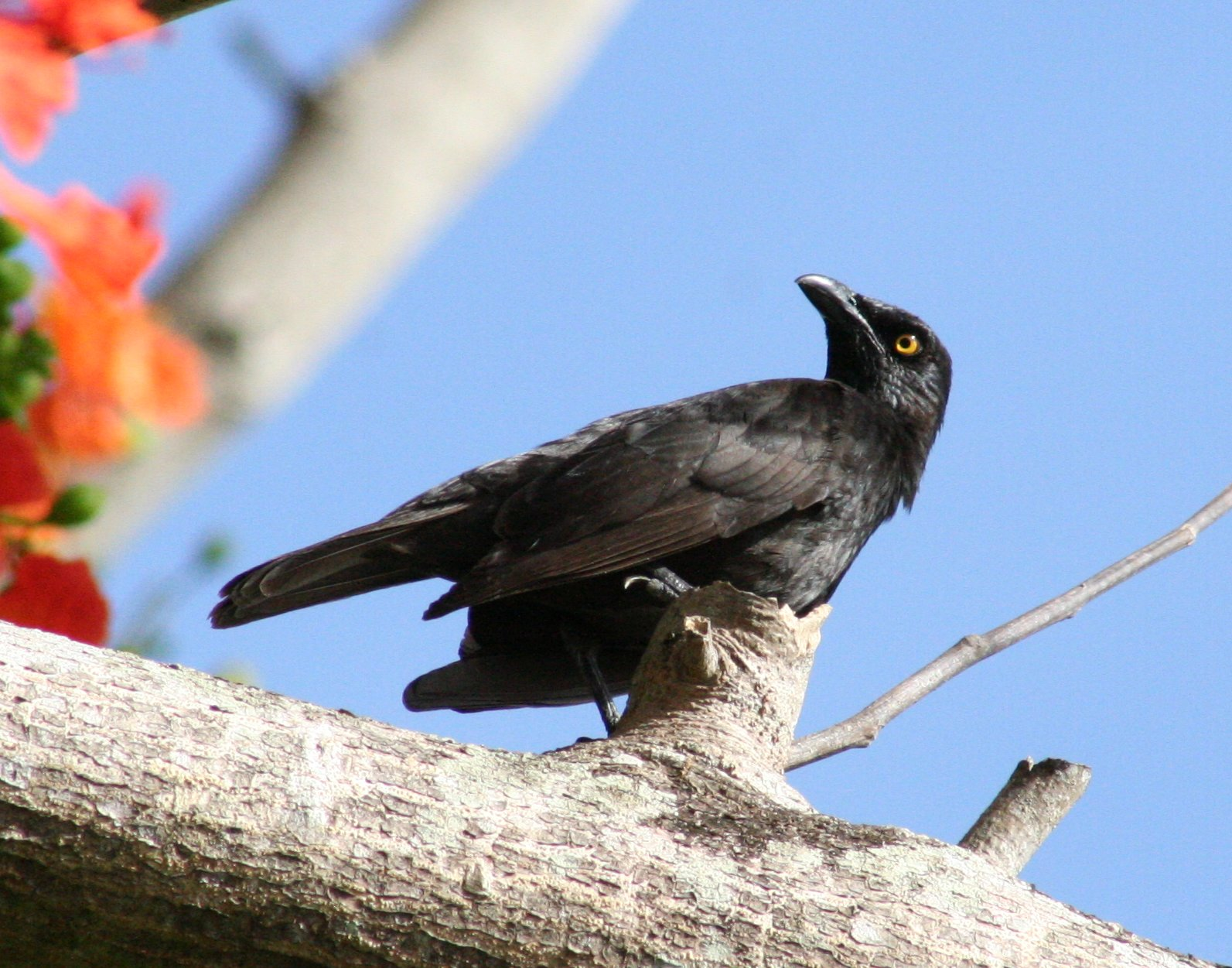
Micronesian starling

Order: Passeriformes Family: Sturnidae

Starlings are small to medium-sized passerine birds. Their flight is strong and direct and they are very gregarious. Their preferred habitat is fairly open country. They eat insects and fruit. Plumage is typically dark with a metallic sheen.

- Micronesian starling, Aplonis opaca

== Old World flycatchers ==
Order: Passeriformes Family: Muscicapidae

The Old World flycatchers form a large family of small passerine birds. These are mainly small arboreal insectivores, many of which, as the name implies, take their prey on the wing.

- Narcissus flycatcher, Ficedula narcissina (A)

== Waxbills, munias, and allies ==
Order: Passeriformes Family: Estrildidae

The members of this family are small passerine birds native to the Old World tropics. They are gregarious and often colonial seed eaters with short thick but pointed bills. They are all similar in structure and habits, but have wide variation in plumage colors and patterns.

- Chestnut munia, Lonchura atricapilla (I)

== Old World sparrows ==
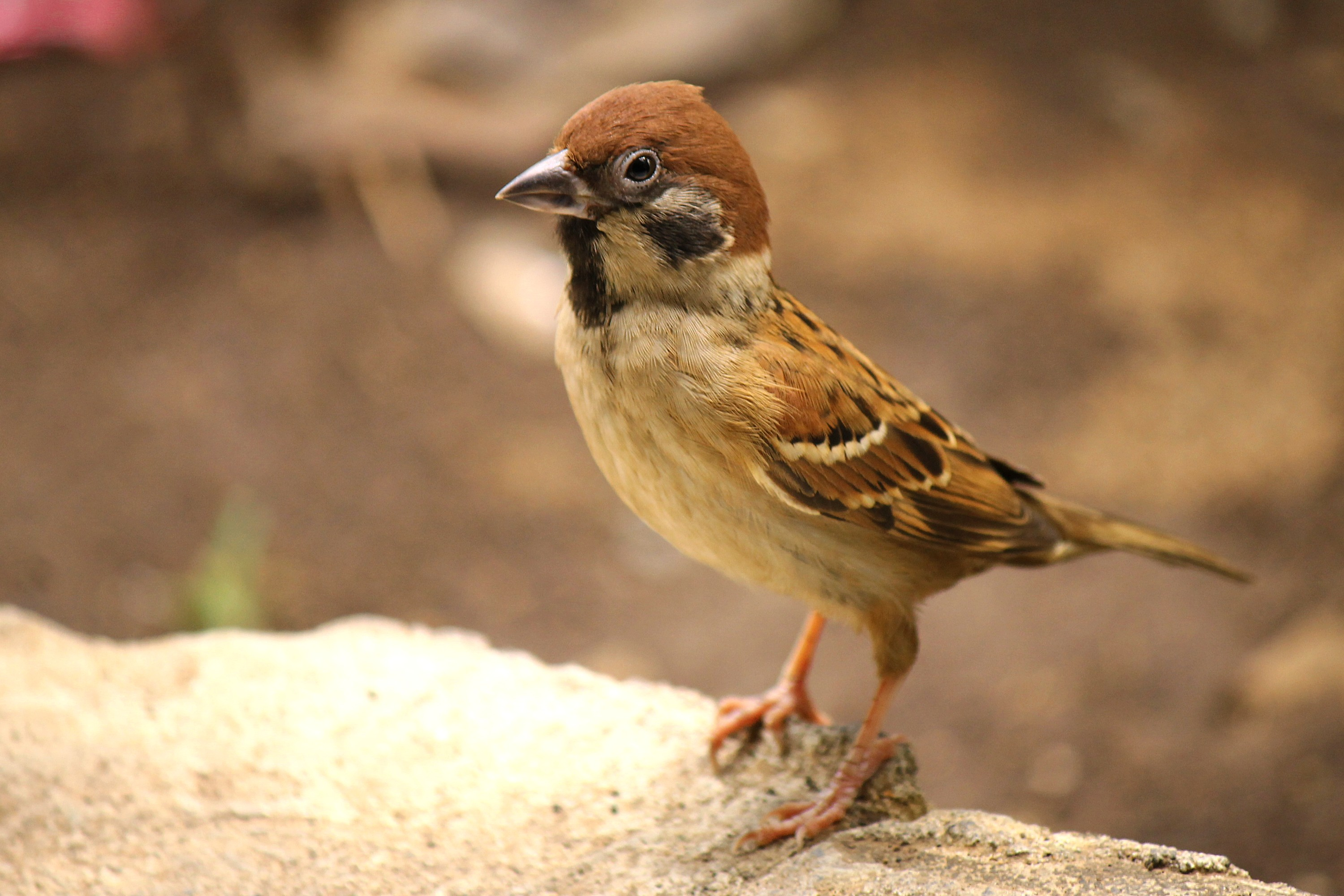
Eurasian tree sparrow

Order: Passeriformes Family: Passeridae

Old World sparrows are small passerine birds. In general, sparrows tend to be small, plump, brown, or gray birds with short tails and short powerful beaks. Sparrows are seed eaters, but they also consume small insects.

- Eurasian tree sparrow, Passer montanus (I)

== Wagtails and pipits ==
Order: Passeriformes Family: Motacillidae

Motacillidae is a family of small passerine birds with medium to long tails. They include the wagtails, longclaws, and pipits. They are slender ground-feeding insectivores of open country.

- Gray wagtail, Motacilla cinerea (A)
- Eastern yellow wagtail, Motacilla tschutschensis (A)
- White wagtail, Motacilla alba (A)

== See also ==
- List of birds
- Lists of birds by region
- List of birds of the Northern Mariana Islands
- List of threatened, endangered and extinct species in the Mariana Islands
