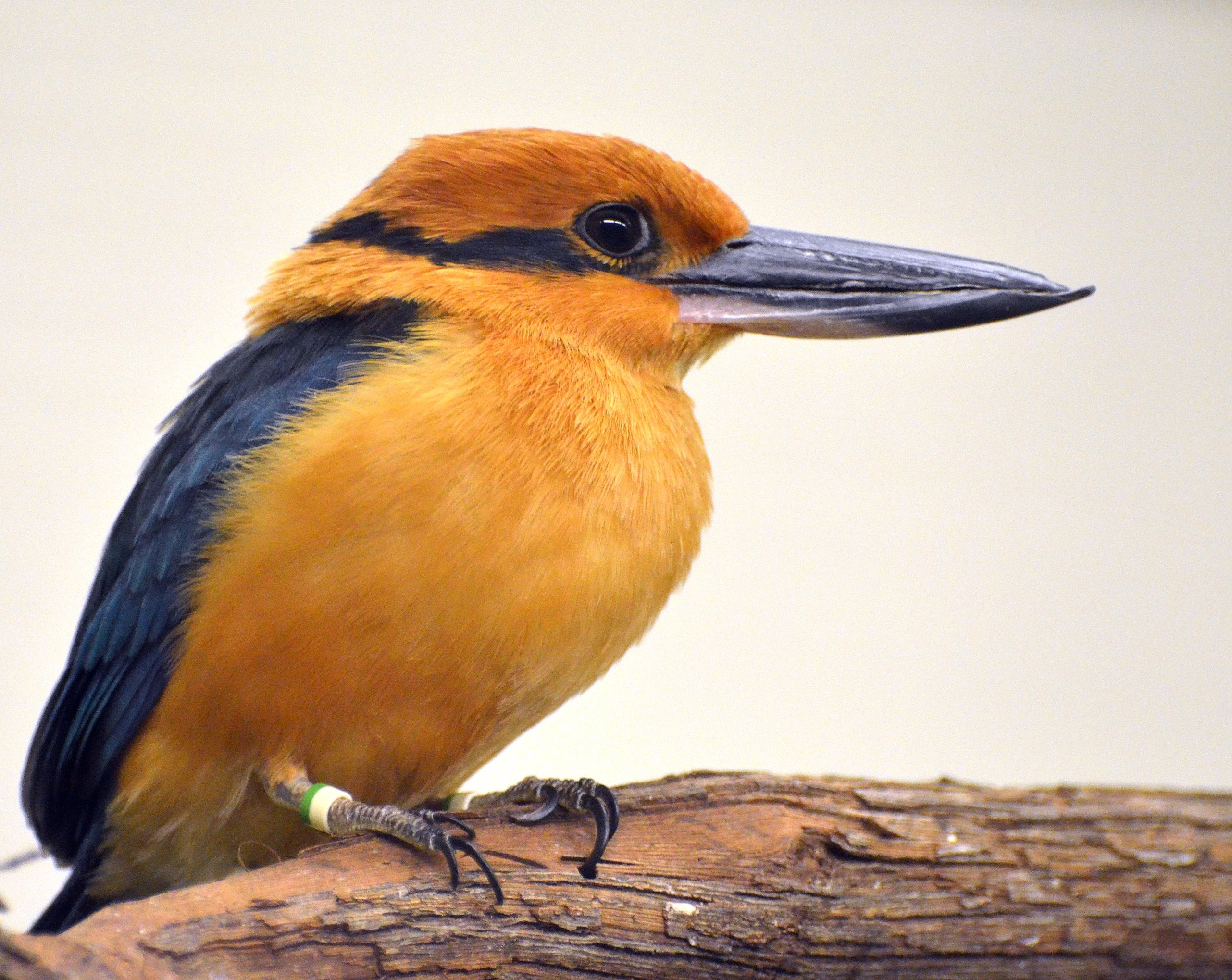
- At Smithsonian's National Zoo, Washington, D.C.

Conservation status
- Extinct in the Wild (IUCN 3.1)

Scientific classification
- Kingdom: Animalia
- Phylum: Chordata
- Class: Aves
- Order: Coraciiformes
- Family: Alcedinidae
- Subfamily: Halcyoninae
- Genus: Todiramphus
- Species: T. cinnamominus

Binomial name
- Todiramphus cinnamominus (Swainson, 1821)

= Guam kingfisher =

Species of bird from Guam

The Guam kingfisher (Todiramphus cinnamominus), called sihek in Chamorro, is a species of kingfisher from the United States Territory of Guam. It is restricted to a captive breeding program following its extinction in the wild due primarily to predation by the introduced brown tree snake.

== Taxonomy and description ==
In the indigenous Chamorro language, it is referred to as sihek.

The mysterious extinct Ryūkyū kingfisher, known from a single specimen, is sometimes placed as a subspecies (T. c. miyakoensis; Fry et al. 1992), but was declared invalid by the International Ornithological Congress in 2022, rendering the species monotypic. Among-island differences in morphological, behavioral, and ecological characteristics have been determined sufficient that Micronesian kingfisher populations, of which the Guam kingfisher was considered a subspecies, should be split into separate species.

This is a brilliantly colored, medium-sized kingfisher, 20–24 cm (7.9–9.4 in) in length. They have iridescent blue backs and rusty-cinnamon heads. Adult male Guam kingfishers have cinnamon underparts while females and juveniles are white below. They have large laterally-flattened bills and dark legs. The calls of Micronesian kingfishers are generally raspy chattering.

== Behavior ==
Guam kingfishers are terrestrial forest generalists that tended to be somewhat secretive. The birds nested in cavities excavated from soft-wooded trees and arboreal termitaria, on Guam. Micronesian kingfishers defended permanent territories as breeding pairs and family groups. Both sexes care for young, and some offspring remain with parents for extended periods. Research suggests that thermal environment has the potential to influence reproduction.

In the wild, the Guam kingfisher feeds on Insects, Spiders, Lizards, and small crustaceans. The birds dive and capture their prey on the ground, similar to other species of kingfishers that dive for fish in water.

== Conservation status ==
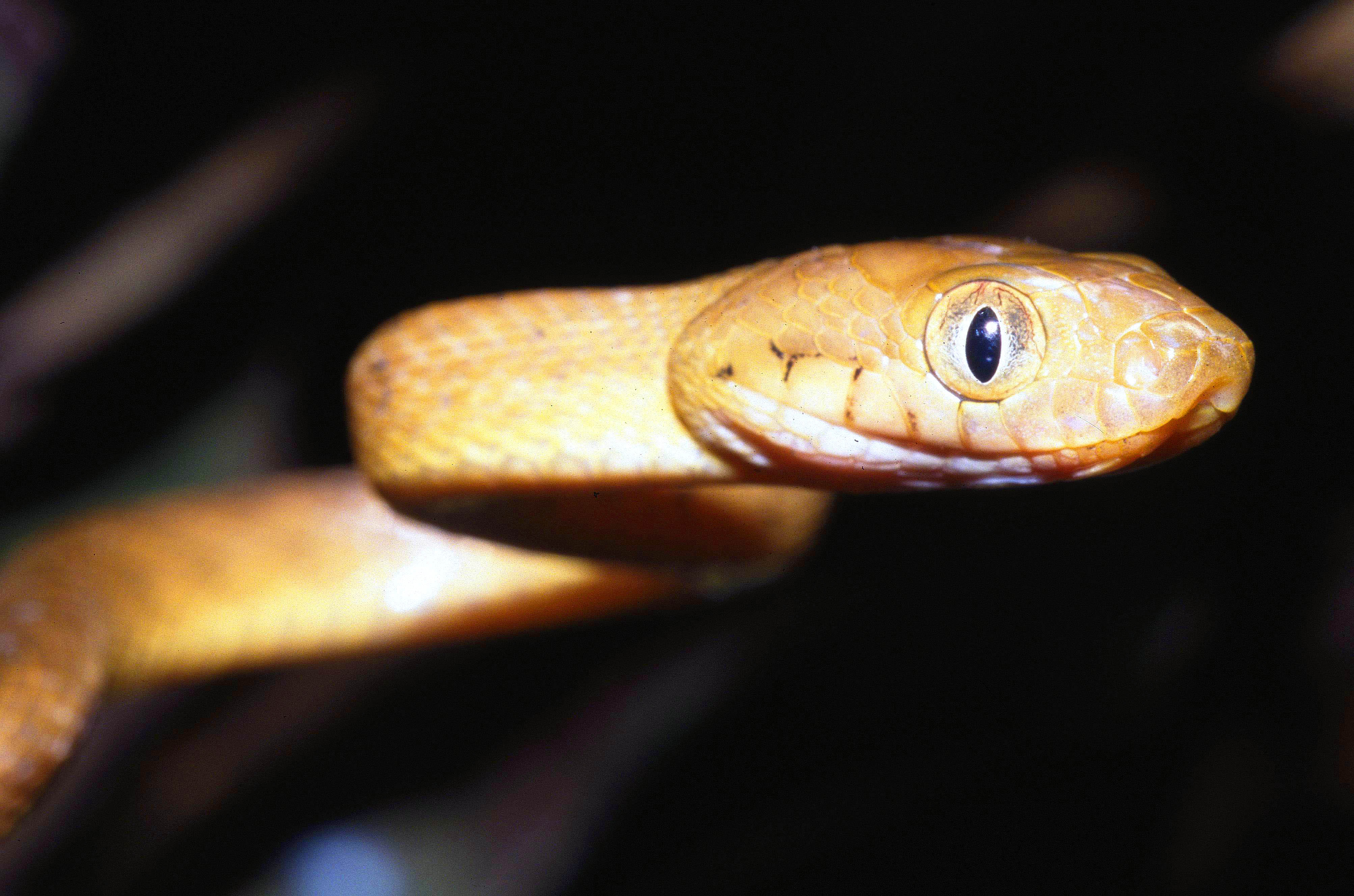
Predation from the introduced brown tree snake drove the Guam kingfisher to extinction in the wild.

The Guam kingfisher population was extirpated from its native habitat after the introduction of brown tree snakes. It was last seen in the wild in 1986, and the birds are now U.S. listed as endangered. The Guam kingfisher persists as a captive population of fewer than two hundred individuals (as of 2017) in US mainland and Guam breeding facilities. There are plans to reintroduce the Guam birds to Palmyra Atoll, and potentially also back to their native range on Guam if protected areas can be established and the threat of the brown tree snakes is eliminated or better controlled.

As of September 2024, all nine of the Guam kingfishers that were transferred from the Brookfield Zoo, Cincinnati Zoo and Botanical Garden, National Aviary, Sedgwick County Zoo, and Disney's Animal Kingdom, have been released on Cooper Island, in Palmyra Atoll. The introduced population has since begun breeding with the first eggs sighted in April 2025, the first laid in the wild in over 40 years.

== In popular culture ==
In 2023 the Guam kingfisher was featured on a United States Postal Service Forever stamp as part of the Endangered Species set, based on a photograph from Joel Sartore's Photo Ark. The stamp was dedicated at a ceremony at the National Grasslands Visitor Center in Wall, South Dakota.

A mated pair of Guam kingfishers can be viewed by the public at the National Aviary in Pittsburgh, one of the participants in the species survival plan.

== See also ==
- List of birds of Guam
