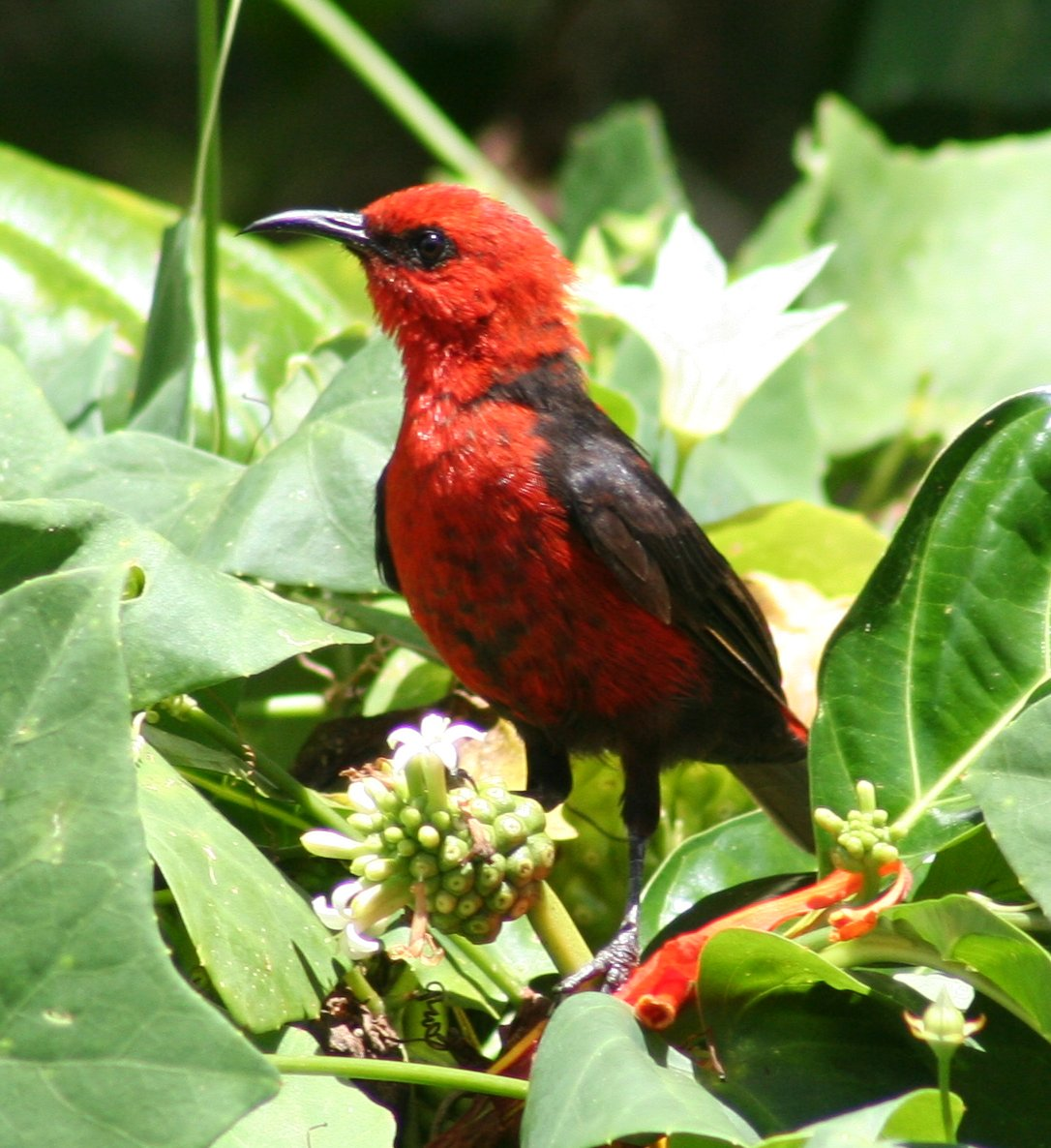
- M. r. saffordi, Saipan

Conservation status
- Least Concern (IUCN 3.1)

Scientific classification
- Kingdom: Animalia
- Phylum: Chordata
- Class: Aves
- Order: Passeriformes
- Family: Meliphagidae
- Genus: Myzomela
- Species: M. rubratra

Binomial name
- Myzomela rubratra (Lesson, 1827)

Synonyms
- Cinnyris rubrater (Lesson, 1827); Myzomela major Bonaparte, 1854; Myzomela rubrater Hartlaub, 1852

= Micronesian myzomela =

Species of bird

The Micronesian myzomela (Myzomela rubratra) is a small honeyeater. It is found on the Caroline and Mariana archipelagos, both part of Micronesia. It occurs in and around the edges of forests, as well as coconut plantations, coastal strand, savanna brush, villages, towns, and gardens.

Both sexes have a predominantly dark body with scarlet patches—the location and coloration, however, varies widely by subspecies. When mature, the female, unlike the male, usually has olive fringing on her tail and wing feathers and brown on her body. The male does not have any brown on his body. In comparison to adults, juveniles are browner, and have little or no red coloring. The Micronesian myzomela has a unique song at dawn—a continuous stream of trilled whistles and phrases, lasting for about 25 minutes on Kosrae, Yap, or Pohnpei, or a wheezy whistle on the Mariana Islands. Later in the day, the Kosrae bird produces a short, variable song and a wide array of scolding or buzzy calls. On the Mariana Islands, the daytime song is a simple and tuneful "per-mit-you". The Palau bird's call is unique to the species, resembling that of the great crested flycatcher or Micronesian starling. The Micronesian myzomela is omnivorous, feeding on nectar and small invertebrates, mainly insects.

The Micronesian myzomela likely breeds year-round. Courtship behaviors are varied—grounded displays where pairs walk together along branches on Aguijan; and erratic aerial chases where the male chases the female, often touching wingtips, on Guam. The nest is built low to the ground, in shrubs or small trees with thick foliage, often along woodland edges, open areas, or near residential buildings. It is cup-shaped, and may be composed of grasses and other plant fibers, often with a distinct inner lining. The nest measures between 50 to 85 mm in width and 20 to 70 mm in depth. The bird usually lays 1 to 2 eggs per clutch, which are glossy and white to off-white with brown speckles, averaging 18.5 by 13.6 mm. Incubation is probably done solely by the female and takes 15 to 16 days. Hatchlings are altricial, fledging after two weeks.

It is considered a least-concern species by BirdLife International with an estimated total population of 850,000–900,000 individuals spread across an estimated range of 2,520,000 km^{2}; however, land development and invasive species have led to a decline on some islands, among them Guam, where the introduced brown tree snake drove the Micronesian myzomela to local extinction in 1986.

== Taxonomy ==
The Micronesian myzomela was first formally described as Cinnyris rubrater by René Lesson in 1827, who first observed it while exploring Kosrae. Gustav Hartlaub placed it in its current genus, first in 1852 as M. rubrater, then amended in 1854 to M. rubratra. In 1932, Ernst Mayr deemed it conspecific with the cardinal myzomela (Myzomela cardinalis), however it was later split back out in 1987 due to differences in appearance and voice. Its specific epithet, rubratra, is a compound of Latin rubra and atra, meaning "red" and "black" respectively, and its genus, Myzomela, comes from Greek muzaō (meaning "to suck") and meli (meaning "honey").

Within the genus Myzomela, the Micronesian myzomela is most closely related to the Rotuma myzomela (M. chermesina); together, they form part of a small clade that also includes the sulphur-breasted myzomela, the Samoan myzomela, and the cardinal myzomela.

=== Subspecies ===
Seven subspecies of the Micronesian myzomela are recognized.

- M. r. rubratra (Lesson, 1827)—The nominate subspecies. Found on Kosrae of the Caroline Islands.
- M. r. dichromata Wetmore, 1919—Found on Pohnpei of the Caroline Islands. Its name comes from Latin dichromata, meaning two-colored.
- M. r. major Bonaparte, 1854—Found on Chuuk Lagoon of the Caroline Islands. Its name comes from Latin major, meaning greater or larger. M. r. wetmorei is a synonym for major.
- M. r. kurodai Momiyama, 1922—Found on Yap of the Caroline Islands. It is named after Nagamichi Kuroda, a Japanese ornithologist.
- M. r. kobayashii Momiyama, 1922—Found on the islands of Palau, of the Caroline Islands. It is named after Keisuke Kobayashi, Sr, a Japanese ornithologist and oologist.
- M. r. asuncionis Salomonsen, 1966—Found from Anatahan to Asuncion of the Northern Mariana Islands.
- M. r. saffordi Wetmore, 1917—Found on the southern islands of the Northern Mariana Islands, namely Rota, Aguijan, Tinian, and Saipan. Formerly found on Guam, before its extinction there. It is named after William Edwin Safford, a botanist.

== Description ==
The Micronesian myzomela is a small honeyeater measuring 13 cm in length. The sexes differ in size and appearance: on Saipan, the adult male weighs 15 g (range 12.7–18 g) and has a 72 mm wing chord, a 13 mm bill, a 55 mm tail, and a 21 mm tarsus. The adult female on Saipan is smaller, weighing 12.7 g (range 10.4–15 g) and with a wing chord measuring 66 mm, a 11 mm bill, a 49 mm tail, and a 20 mm tarsus. The bill is distinctly curved downwards. It is colored brown with a yellow base in juveniles, darkening with age, becoming completely black in adults. Similarly, the interior of the mouth also darkens with age, starting bright yellow and becoming black in adults. The tongue is also bright yellow. Its iris is dark brown, and its toes and tarsi are scaly and dark brown, with the undersides of the feet being dull yellow.

The female has dusky brown tail and wing feathers fringed with olive, and a predominantly black or brown body with scarlet patches. The male is similar, though his patches are more vermilion and he lacks any brown coloring. The extent and placement of the patches vary between subspecies in both sexes. Juveniles of both sexes are browner compared to adults and have little to no red coloring. Juveniles molt within three months after fledging, taking on a new formative plumage that greatly resembles adults; however, they may have slightly duller body feathering. One to three months after breeding, the Micronesian myzomela (Note: Preexisting adults and birds still in their formative plumage will both undergo this molt.) will molt into its adult plumage, completely replacing all of its feathers; however, this is sometimes paused, likely for additional breeding.

=== Geographic variation ===
On Kosrae (M. r. rubatra), the adult male's body is almost entirely scarlet, excluding the thighs and the lores (the area between the eye and nostrils), which are black. The adult female's plumage is similar, although she is smaller in size, and her coloring is duller. The juvenile of both sexes is reminiscent of the adult, although it is of a lighter tone in comparison, and its coloring is not as vivid.

The adult male of Pohnpei (M. r. dichromata) strongly resembles that of the Kosrae bird, except that the black markings on his lores and below the eye are more substantial, and the tips of his colored feathers are brighter. The adult female is also similar to that of Kosrae, though the extent of her red plumage is greatly reduced. Her chin, throat, and the underside of her tail are reddish. The rest of her body is colored various shades of brownish-gray, occasionally with reddish patches. The juvenile male resembles the adult, except that his scarlet coloring is less vivid and is thinner on his rump, forehead, underparts, and the base of his tail. The red coloring is usually absent from his neck and the top of his head. The juvenile female is also like the adult, but her scarlet coloring is thinner and only visible on her back, rump, underparts, and the base of her tail.

On Chuuk Lagoon (M. r. major)

On Chuuk Lagoon (M. r. major), both sexes look similar to the Kosrae bird. The adult male's feathers are lighter on the tips. The adult female's underparts are colored a brighter scarlet. The juvenile male looks similar to the adult female, except the feathers on his head and neck have less scarlet coloring on the tips. The juvenile female resembles the juvenile female of Kosrae, except that her upperparts are grayer and her underparts are darker.

On Yap (M. r. kurodai)

On Yap (M. r. kurodai), the adult male resembles the adult male of the Mariana Islands, although his legs are shorter, and his plumage is less orange-hued. The adult female's upperparts are a dark green-brown. Her underparts are paler but otherwise similar, though her breast and abdomen may be yellow-gray. Her head, rump, and lower back, along with her entire frontside, are all tinged scarlet. The immature male resembles the adult female, but his lower back, rump, the underside of his tail, and the top of his head are a much deeper scarlet. His lower parts are tinged with scarlet, though paler than the adult male's. The front of his neck is only faintly tinged, showing a dark band. Some specimens have wing coverts faintly fringed with scarlet and a very narrow olivaceous on the quills' fringes. Immature females and young birds of both sexes resemble the adult female but have a weaker scarlet tinge.

In Palau (M. r. kobayashii), the adult male is similar to the Kosrae bird, however he is smaller and the scarlet coloring on his body is exceptionally dark, more so than that of other subspecies. The adult female resembles the female of Pohnpei, although her abdomen, the underside of her tail feathers, and her axillary feathers ("armpits") are rust-gray. Unlike all other subspecies, the top of her head is only partly colored red. The juvenile male resembles the adult except for his lighter and scantier scarlet coloring. His wings and tail are green-brown, and the underside of his tail is off-gray. The juvenile female is like the adult, just that her scarlet coloring is paler and her underparts are tinted red.

On Rota, Aguijan, Tinian, and Saipan, both sexes (M. r. saffordi) resemble the Kosrae bird, with minor differences. The adult male is slightly smaller and his scarlet coloring is more orange. Unlike the other subspecies, the wings and tail of the southern Mariana male are tinted olive. The adult female is also smaller and paler in color. Her upperparts are dark green-gray occasionally mottled with scarlet, and the underside of her tail and her abdomen are red-gray. She can be differentiated from other subspecies by her scarlet-tipped feathers on the top of her head, and the dark olive coloring on the edges of her tail feathers. Birds from Anatahan north to Asuncion (M. r. asuncionis) are visually identical to these at all ages and in both sexes.

=== Vocalizations ===
The Micronesian myzomela has a complex dawn song that differs from its vocalizations later in the day. On Kosrae, the song begins before there is enough light to see the bird and lasts until it is visible (about 25 minutes); it has been described as sounding like multiple birds singing in unison. The song consists of a continuous stream of trilled whistles and phrases, which may be transcribed as "cheeky cheeky can't beat the heat," "too sweet to eat," or "she eats a pizza". The dawn song on Yap and Pohnpei is similar but quicker and more slurred. Later in the day, the Kosrae bird's song is short and highly variable, usually consisting of two slurred notes ("seee-oo SEET" or "schweer cheap-beer") and one emphatic note. The daytime calls are quite variable, including sharp "tseep!" notes (which may be repeated), short buzzy calls, and rough scolds.

The dawn song on the Mariana Islands is a "wheezy whistle"; on the Northern Mariana Islands it can be transcribed as "ee-zoo-zee-zoo-zee" or "zeeoo-ZEE-zoo-zee". The daytime song, most commonly heard in the early morning, is a simple and tuneful "per-mit-you". In Palau, the calls are unlike those of the Mariana Islands populations and instead resemble those of the great crested flycatcher of North America; the Palau call may also be confused with that of the Micronesian starling.

== Distribution and habitat ==
The Micronesian myzomela is a permanent resident of the Caroline and Mariana islands. It has not been observed moving between islands, but the short distances between some in a chain means it is probably capable of interinsular travel: the closely related Rotuma myzomela, which is found on Rotuma 1,500 to 1,800 km of open ocean away from Pohnpei, is likely the result of a rare dispersion between the two islands. (Note: This distance does not imply continuous flight between the two islands; rather, the proper conditions—advantageous winds, and a lowered sea level—allowed for dispersion and colonization.) The Micronesian myzomela can be found in and on the edges of forests, including secondary, Clinostigma, mangrove, and agroforest types. It also inhabits coconut plantations, coastal strand, savanna brush, villages, towns, and gardens.

On Kosrae, it inhabits every land habitat up to around 600 m, including tall trees along lagoons, mangroves, canals, coconut groves, coconut palms near houses and gardens, and riverbanks. It is especially common in the lowlands. On Pohnpei, it can be found in most habitats, most commonly in undisturbed vegetation, mangroves, and agroforest, and less often in secondary vegetation, although the species is detected more often in disturbed habitats. On Yap, it can be found in all suitable habitats on all islands, being most abundant in low brush. Across these island chains, densities are generally greatest in mangroves (particularly Sonneratia alba mangroves), and appear related to tree maturity—densities were lower in younger mangroves.

In Palau, it can be found in open woodlands, secondary vegetation, forest edges and openings, broken forest, and agroforest near villages. It also inhabits coconut groves, flower gardens, and other areas around human habitation, but is uncommon to rare in unbroken mature native forest and was not recorded in dense jungle. On Guam, it could be found in scrub, second growth, and mixed woodland, as well as grassland, riparian habitats, low shrubs along streams, mangrove swamps, and coastal strand near wetlands, and by 1981 reached its highest densities in the relatively undisturbed forests of the north. It also inhabited gardens, yards, and coconut groves, including palms around the resort hotels of Tumon Bay, and visited the flowers of coconut palms, banana trees, and day-blooming jasmines.

In the Northern Mariana Islands, it is especially common where nectar-producing flowers are present, and is most abundant in mixed second growth near village gardens; within native forest it primarily occupies the upper canopy. It is typically absent from open, grassy savanna, but sometimes forages where flowering herbaceous vegetation is present. On Rota, it can be found in open forest and in Pemphis scrub near the beach, and occasionally in fields on the high-elevation Mt. Sabana. On Sarigan, it occupies native forest and coconut palm agroforest. On Aguijan, it occupies native forest on steep limestone escarpments, where browsing by feral goats leaves the understory open, as well as thickets of the introduced Lantana camara on level ground formerly cultivated for sugarcane. On Saipan and Tinian, it can be found in native limestone forest, upland forest, and secondary forest of coconut palm, Delonix regia, and various large fruit trees. It is more abundant in native forest and second growth than in Leucaena leucocephala thickets, where less nectar is available. It also inhabits littoral Casuarina stands, beach strand, mangroves, cultivated areas, suburban areas, and vegetation around habitations, and is particularly common near coconut groves, but is largely absent from swordgrass savanna. On Mt. Tapotchau, where near-cloud-forest conditions occur at the summit, it frequents native and secondary forest, appearing regularly from about 1.3 km below the summit downward.

== Behavior ==
With few exceptions, honeyeaters are monogamous. The Micronesian myzomela is a weak flyer, usually only travelling at most 5 meters. It primarily moves while foraging by flying or hopping.

=== Breeding ===
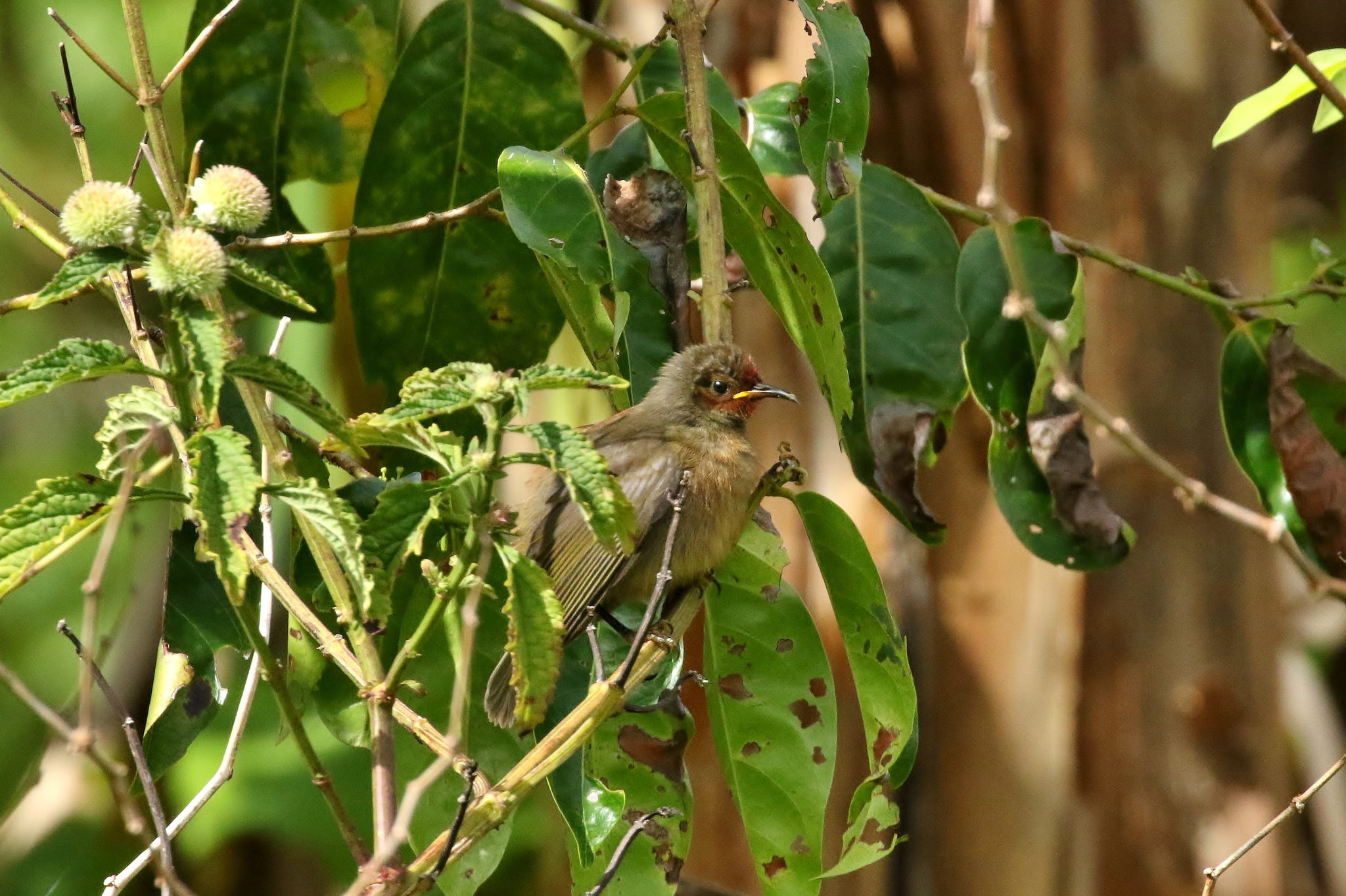
Juvenile on Yap (M. r. kurodai)

The Micronesian myzomela nests year-round, and likely breeds year-round as well. On Pohnpei, eggs were recorded in nests from July to September. On Chuuk, eggs have been found year-round, with most nests dated to May–July and one to March. On Kosrae, a nest with nestlings was found in April. During 1983–1984, newly fledged birds were recorded on Chuuk in March, on Yap in May, and on Kosrae in July. On Saipan, nest-building has been observed in February in each year from 1988 to 1993, and seven nests were found there in 2003–2004; two contained eggs, two contained nestlings, two were empty, and the seventh was occupied by a female, which prevented the nest's contents from being checked. Courtship was observed on Aguijan in May 1992, and newly fledged birds on Rota in March 1982. Courtship on Aguijan consisted of the pair walking in tandem along a sturdy branch with elevated heads, periodically switching directions so that the follower became the leader. On Guam, courtship interactions were observed to take place throughout the year, at any time of day; they usually consisted of flights lasting for 20–30 seconds, where the male pursued the female along circular, vertical, or zig-zag paths, often touching wingtips. The male would sometimes utter quiet staccato notes during these flights.

On Chuuk, nests are most often found near houses that had flowering plants nearby. The nests are usually built in small trees with thick foliage, often on the edges of wooded areas or open areas, placed less than 4.6 meters from the ground. Nests are usually composed of weed stems, bits of leaves, grasses, and coir, and lined with fine grasses. On the outside, they are on average 20 mm deep, and 50 mm wide. On Guam, nests were usually placed 1.2–2.4 meters off the ground, in shrubs or trees, and more rarely 2.5–4.6 meters off the ground, on the outer branches of trees. There, nests had deep cups made of grasses and rootlets, with the outside composed of leaves, wool, cobwebs, and other similar materials. They were 50–70 mm deep and 60–80 mm wide. On Pohnpei, nests are cup-shaped, and are made up of two layers; the inner layer is composed of one material, such as dead grass, fine roots, or coir, however the exact material varies by nest. The outer layer is composed mostly of a mix of stems, ferns, fine roots. The inner and outer diameters of the nest are 43–58 mm and 65–85 mm respectively. Nests are around 20 mm deep, and measure 35–45 mm in height.

The eggs are usually white and gray with dark yellow-brown speckles concentrated at the narrower tip. On Chuuk, eggs are on average 18.5 by 13.6 mm. On Pohnpei, clutches are usually two eggs; in a sample of 13 nests, 10 had two eggs, and three had one egg. On Saipan, a nest was found with creamy white eggs, which had two distinct rings of brown spots on either end.

On Saipan, egg incubation lasts for 15–16 days, and is probably done exclusively by the female. The incubation behavior resembles that of other honeyeaters. At birth, nestlings are altricial, and, until their red pin feathers erupt, resemble nestling bridled white-eyes (another local species). In one nest, nestlings were around 2 cm in length, with dark pink skin and had down on their wings and backs. By days 6–7, their eyes started to open, and the pin feathers on their backs began to erupt. Both nestlings prematurely fledged on days 13–14; one of them was returned to the nest, and fully fledged on day 15-16. On Pohnpei, the female exclusively feeds the young.

=== Territorial behavior ===
On Guam, boundary disputes among males commonly escalated into mid-air chases. Once these interactions concluded, the males retreated to separate perches and resumed singing or calling. On Saipan, the species aggressively defended territories against other Micronesian myzomelas through vocal duels. However, this territoriality decreased near concentrated nectar sources like Lantana camara, where multiple individuals could forage together. Additionally, there exists a population of non-territorial "floater" birds on Saipan, composed mostly of females and juveniles. These floaters likely account for seasonal population variations, as they chase temporary food sources. The male Micronesian myzomela is highly aggressive, chasing other species (especially white-eyes) away from defended flowering trees. On Pohnpei, a male was observed diving at or chasing grey-brown white-eyes, Pohnpei flycatchers, and Pohnpei kingfishers. On Saipan and Aguijan in 1988–1993, the Micronesian myzomela chased individuals and scattered flocks of the golden white-eye, bridled white-eye, and Micronesian rufous fantail. Additionally, a Micronesian starling was observed displacing a Micronesian myzomela from a perch.

=== Foraging and diet ===
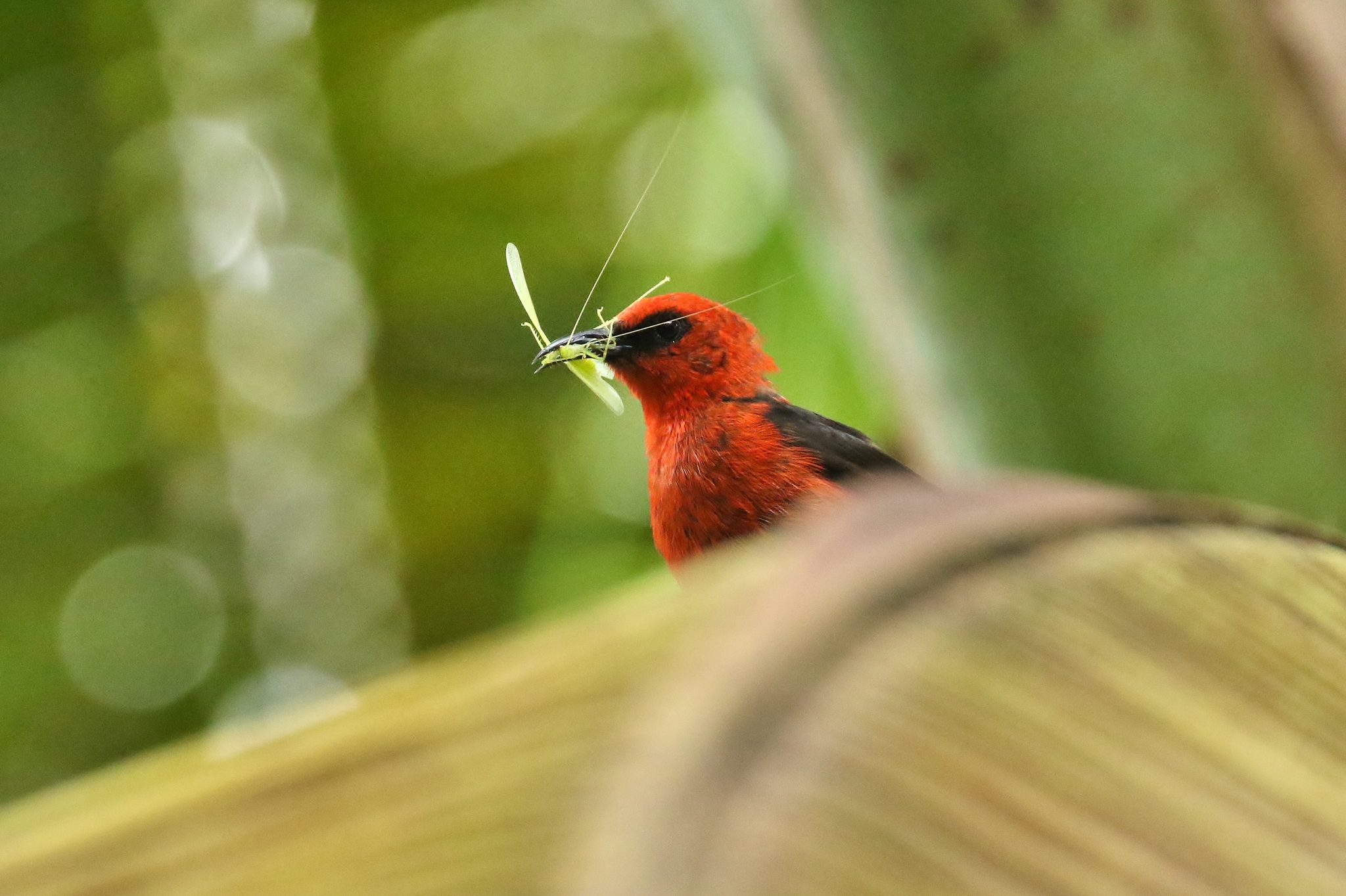
On Pohnpei (M. r. dichromata) with an insect

The Micronesian myzomela usually forages with its mate, following the same route every time. The male leads, and the female follows. On Pohnpei, it can be found foraging throughout the forest, though it is more common near nectar sources. On Yap and Kosrae, it forages in shrubs, in savannas and small ravines, respectively. On Guam, an adult (followed by a juvenile) was observed probing a morning glory, and another adult was observed probing a white flower on a shrub. It was commonly found foraging around the day-blooming jasmine, feeding on nectar and insects. It was also common near coconut palms, especially when their reproductive parts were developing.

On Saipan in 1988–1989, it was observed foraging in trees 20–47 (avg. 34) m high. Most (82.5%) of these trees were canopy trees (trees that occupy the uppermost layer of foliage). Trees used during foraging included Indian coral trees, coconut palms, hibiscus trees, white leadtrees, Delonix regia, Premna serratifolia, and Aidia cochinchinensis. Bitter melon vines were also used. About 92.5% of foraging time was spent in the upper strata, and the remainder in mid-strata. Around 90% of foraging perches were flowers, 7.5% live leaves, and 2.5% flower buds. Around 36% of perches were less than 0.5 cm thick, and 64% were larger. Gleaning accounted for 10% of foraging behavior, with probing accounting for the remaining 90%.

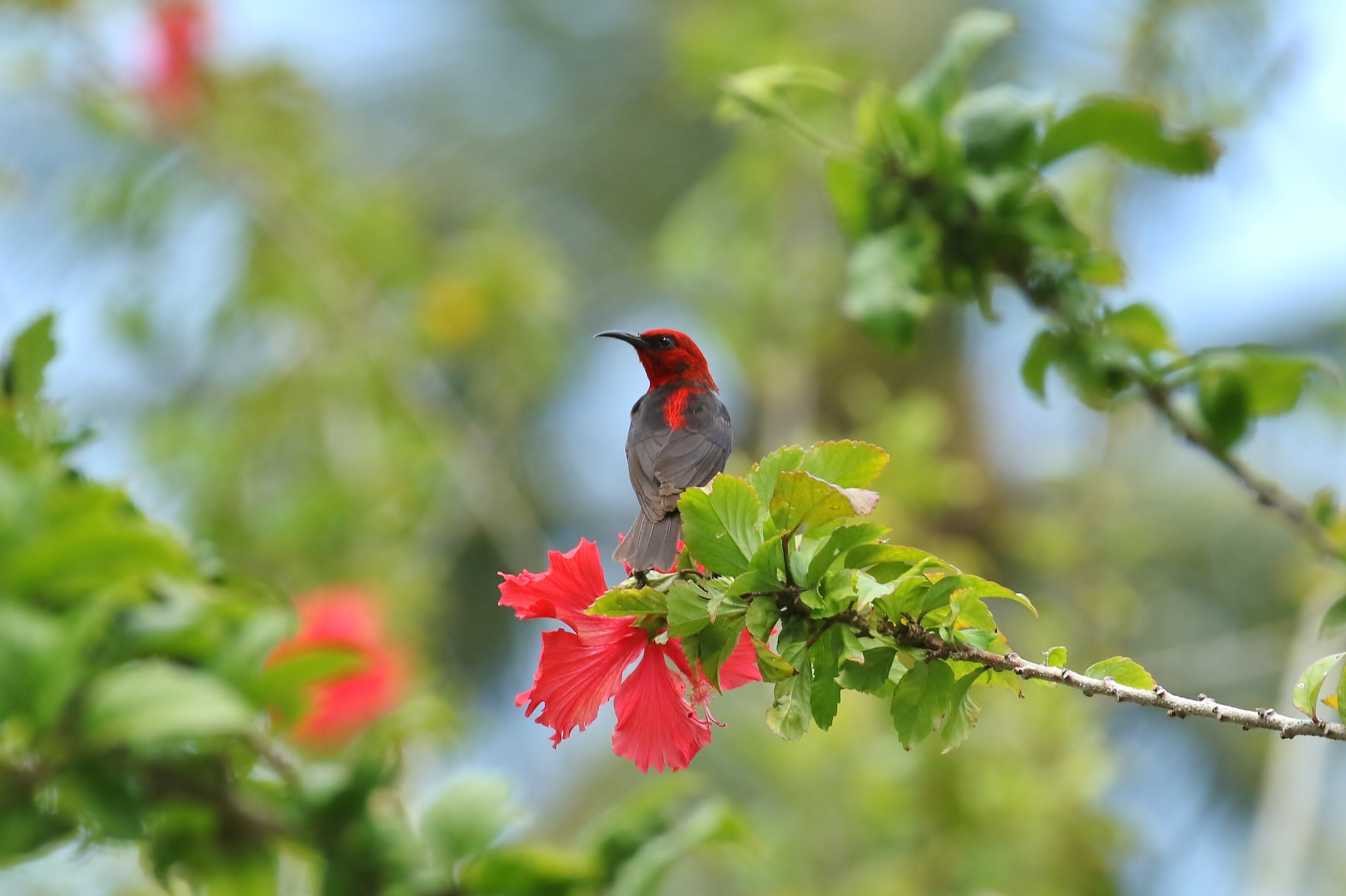
On Yap (M. r. kurodai), perching on a Chinese hibiscus flower

On Saipan in 1990–1991, it was observed foraging in trees 27–43 (avg. 35) m high. 85% of foraging time was spent in the upper strata, the remainder being spent in mid-lower strata. Native forests were usually occupied during the dry season, when Indian coral trees were in bloom. Additional trees used during foraging included forest wild coffee, Aidia cochinchinensis, and Cynometra ramiflora. Vines on trees were also used. Tree and strata preference was noted to be similar to that of the bridled white-eye; although the Micronesian myzomela primarily foraged in Indian coral trees. 81% of foraging perches were flowers and 14.3% were live leaves; 35% of perches were less than 0.5 cm in size, and 65% were larger. Gleaning accounted for 16.7% of foraging behavior, the remaining 83.3% being probing.

On Aguijan in May 1992, 73.7% of foraging time was spent in the upper strata, the remainder being spent in mid-lower strata. Trees used during foraging included forest wild coffee, lebbek, Bikkia mariannensis, and Delonix regia. It was also found using Lantana camara. Of foraging perches, 68.4% were flowers, 15.8% live leaves, and 15.8% branches; 72.2% of perches were less than 0.5 cm thick, and 27.8% were larger. Gleaning accounted for 30% of foraging behavior, the remaining 70% being probing.

The Micronesian myzomela is omnivorous, feeding on nectar and small invertebrates, mainly insects. It feeds on flowers from tall-stilt mangrove, coconut palm, noni, cassava, Lantana camara, Morinda citrifolia, Sonneratia alba, as well as species from the genera Clinostigma, Parinari, Musa, Hibiscus, Schefflera, Elaeocarpus, and Cyrtandra. Ernst Mayr estimated that on Guam, 60% of their diet was nectar, 40% insects. In Palau, both specimens acquired had vegetable matter, seeds, and small insects in their stomachs.

=== Survival ===
Ernst Mayr reported in 1945 that there were four times as many males observed than females, however in 1951 Rollin H. Baker reported there was a sex ratio of 2.5:1. Mark Jenkins reported a 1.5:1 sex ratio in 1983. This discrepancy is likely due to the male being much more prominent than the female due to his frequent song and aggressive behavior.

On Guam, a female was observed feigning injury, spreading her tail and quivering her wings, and made calls while hopping on a low-lying branch. On Saipan, nesting adults become agitated when observed; one would feign injury, drooping one wing and fluttering close to the ground, with the other usually making scolding calls. When alone, an adult would sometimes scold while feigning injury. This behavior was only observed in adults with nestlings. Micronesian myzomelas on Saipan are very intolerant of disturbance during incubation; in a 2005 nesting study, all nests where the incubating female was disturbed failed. In the same study, 21 artificial nests were monitored. (Note: Zebra finch eggs (filled with colored wax) were placed in 3 bridled white-eye nests, 14 Micronesian rufous fantail nests, and 4 golden white-eye nests, all of which were studied.) Of those, 6 were depredated, four by Micronesian starlings, one by a Mariana kingfisher, and one by an unidentified bird smaller than a Micronesian starling. (Note: This may have been a Micronesian rufous fantail trying to remove the bait egg from its nest.) Between 2008 and 2018 on Saipan, the mean population growth rate of 0.92, with an average apparent survival probability(the probability that a bird both survives the year, and stays in the same area) of 37%.

On Rota and Saipan, the Micronesian myzomela did not seem to be affected by typhoons. Within the Mariana Islands, emerald tree skinks and rats are non-avian nest predators; however it is uncommon for rats (along with cats and the mangrove monitor) to prey on tree nesting birds there.

== Conservation ==
The Micronesian myzomela is a least-concern species on the IUCN Red List, with an estimated total population of 850,000–900,000 individuals spread across an estimated range of 2,520,000 km^{2}. In the local Micronesian languages this bird was known as "egigi" or "hibiscus bird" on Guam, "chuchurica" on the Mariana Islands, "likeitepar" on Chuuk, "srusr" on Kosrae, "chesisebangiau" in Palau, "pwiliet" on Pohnpei, and "umel" on Yap.

=== Populations ===
On Guam, the species was found on 37.6% of 125 roadside counts in 1945; there were 231.3 individuals per km^{2} in 1977; and in 1981, density was computed at 62/km^{2} (range 3–160/km^{2} at sites where present), with a total estimated population of 2,682 (range 2,300–3,140); in 1983, populations in the Pajon Basin declined by 73% in only two months, and the last individual recorded on a survey was in 1984.

On Saipan, there were 101.3 individuals per km^{2} in 1977; (Note: The total population was not reported.) island-wide density estimates using updated analytic techniques were 360.1±57.6/km^{2} in 1982, 386.7±63.8/km^{2} in 1997, and 482.3±76.7/km^{2} in 2007, with a total 2007 population estimated at 64,351 (range 47,192–86,556) and a significant 25-year population increase; a reanalysis of these surveys added a 2018 estimate of 254±230/km^{2} and yielded reassessed total populations of 49,831±3,851 in 1982, 35,157±3,680 in 1997, 51,058±5,179 in 2007, and 30,207±2,775 in 2018.

On Tinian, initial analysis suggested an estimated density of 87.6±13.5/km^{2} in 1982, 35.6±6.8/km^{2} in 1996, and 47.3±9.0/km^{2} in 2008, with a total 2008 population estimated at 3,254 (range 2,305–4,662). A later reanalysis yielded density estimates of 172±22/km^{2} in 1982, 68±11/km^{2} in 1996, 56±5/km^{2} in 2008, and 59±6/km^{2} in 2013—with a total population of 16,862 (range 13,473–21,754) in 1982, 6,675 (range 4,896–9,247) in 1996, 5,456 (range 4,560–6,462) in 2008, and 5,779 (range 4,768–6,918) in 2013, suggesting a population decline. (Note: The 1982 estimate may be an outlier, perhaps due to differences in methodology.)

On Asuncion, there were 713 individuals per km^{2} in 2008. On Alamagan, there were 390.5/km^{2} in 2017, with a total island population of 1,526±166. On Guguan, there were 197.5/km^{2} in 2016, with a total forest population estimated at 327 and a total island population of 876; this was higher than the 2000 estimate of roughly 450. On Sarigan, island-wide density estimates were 1,679/km^{2} in 1990, 1,677/km^{2} in 1997, 945/km^{2} in 1999, 859/km^{2} in 2000, and 1,240/km^{2} in 2006, with breeding pairs estimated at 4,130 in 2006; despite these population estimates, detections per station grew from 1990 to 2006.

On Rota, there were 306.7 individuals per km^{2} in 1977, 352/km^{2} in 1982, and 173.8±2.0/km^{2} in 2012. Total population estimates were 49,962 (range 38,276–63,191) in 1982, 33,303 (range 25,346–42,613) in 1989, 32,319 (range 23,755–43,288) in 1994, 21,317 (range 14,860–29,138) in 2006, and 16,441 (range 12,399–21,270) in 2012, suggesting a downward population trend. On Aguijan, there were 570 individuals per km^{2} in 1982, 1,948/km^{2} in 1992, 1,310/km^{2} in 2000, and 1420/km^{2} in 2002. Total population estimates were 2,195 in 1982, 3,611 in 2000, and 3,913 in 2002.

On Kosrae, there were 1,433 individuals per km^{2} in July 1983, with a total estimated population of 136,358.

On Pohnpei, there were 423.4 individuals per km^{2} in 1977; in 1983–1984, there were 1,071 individuals per km^{2} (range 995–1,118), with a total estimated population of 358,065.

On Chuuk, there were 688.3 individuals per km^{2} in 1977, and in 1983–1984, there were 2,067 individuals per km^{2} (range 1,564–4,803), with a total estimated population of 165,440. On Yap, there were 169.0 individuals per km^{2} in 1977, and in 1983–1984, there were 1,098 individuals per km^{2} (range 836–1,792), with a total estimated population of 109,363. In Palau, there were 36.6 individuals per km^{2} in 1977, and in 1991, there were 138 individuals per km^{2}, with a total estimated population of 35,362, and notably, it was not recorded on Angaur. On Agrihan, there were 2,239 individuals per km^{2} in 2000.

=== Threats ===
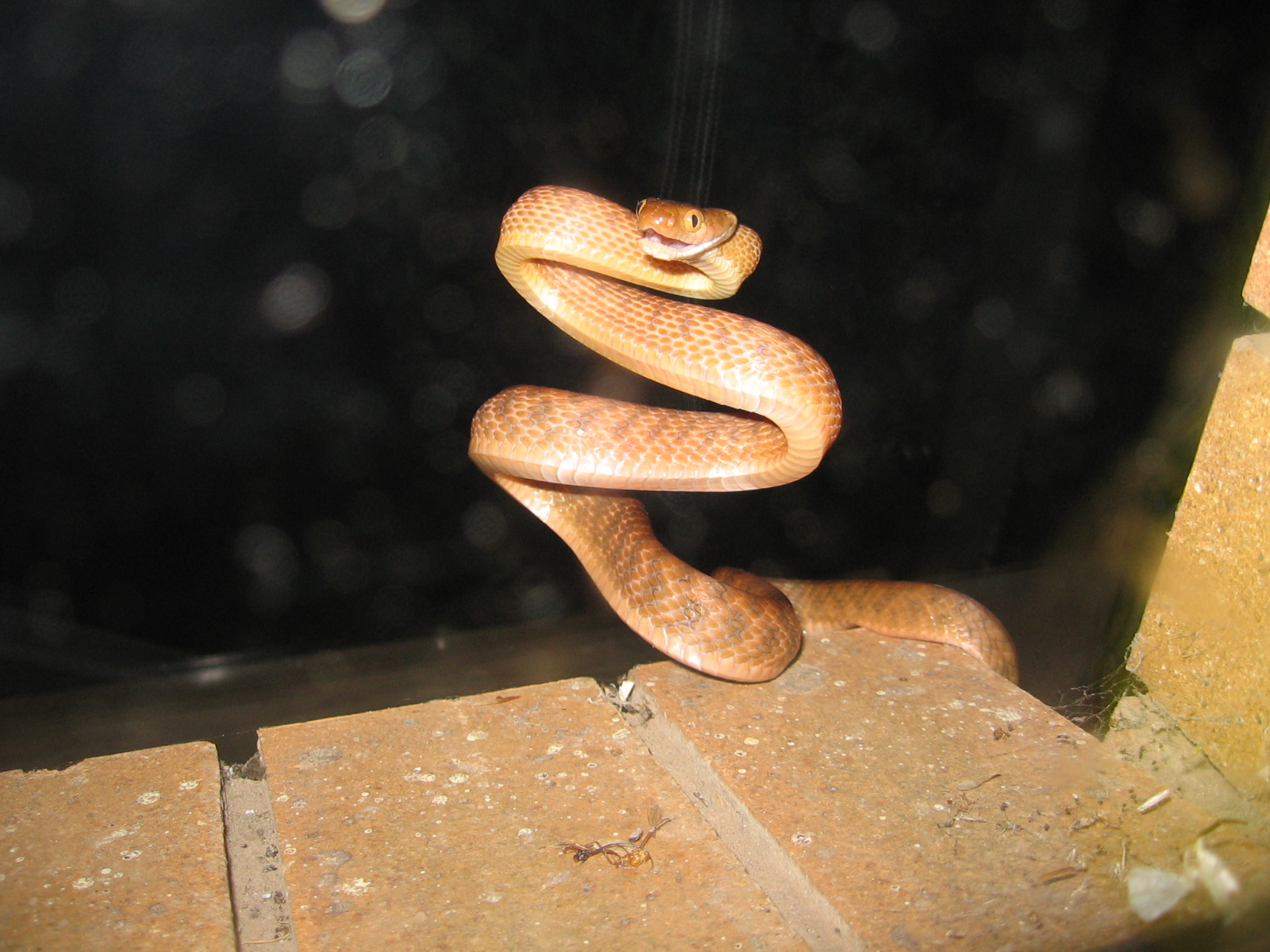
Predation by the brown tree snake eventually resulted in the extinction of Micronesian myzomela on Guam.

Following the introduction of the brown tree snake in the 1940s, the Micronesian myzomela's population on Guam fell rapidly, eventually resulting in its extinction in 1986. The snake was likely introduced as a stowaway in military cargo in the late 1940s or early 1950s, with the first recorded sighting in south-central Guam in the early 1950s. As all of Saipan's imported goods go through Guam, the brown tree snake has also been reported there; however, it is unlikely that there is an incipient (Note: Incipient means a population that is new, small, and localized but growing.) population. On Rota, predation by the black drongo was a cause in the population decline of the Rota white-eye and the Micronesian rufous fantail, and as such may also be a cause in the population decline of Micronesian myzomela.

On Saipan, the ivy gourd, introduced c. 1998, has also affected the Micronesian myzomela's habitat by smothering native and non-native forest. Aside from invasive species, urbanization and economic development are the largest threats to Saipan's native birds. The expansion of Tinian International Airport and military training at the former Tinian Naval Base have also reduced the Micronesian myzomela's habitat. On Pohnpei, between 1983 and 1994, native upland forest coverage dropped from 42% in 1983 to 15% in 1994. This reduction was due to the clearing of forests to make way for kava cultivation, which also grows best in the upland. As the brown tree snake is not present on Pohnpei, habitat loss is probably the leading factor in population changes.

As Kosrae has relatively low population and development, there are no serious threats to survival there. Children have been observed using homemade slingshots to shoot the Micronesian myzomela.

== See also ==
- List of birds of Guam
- List of birds of the Northern Mariana Islands

== Bibliography ==
- Baker, Rollin H. (1951). The Avifauna of Micronesia, Its Origin, Evolution, and Distribution. Vol. 3. University of Kansas Natural History Museum. ISSN 0075-5036. LCCN 51062489. OCLC 3655141 – via Project Gutenberg.
- BirdLife International (2024). "Micronesian Myzomela". IUCN Red List of Threatened Species. 2024 e.T22703865A263807131. doi:10.2305/IUCN.UK.2024-2.RLTS.T22703865A263807131.en.
- Craig, Robert J.; Beal, Kathleen G. (2001). "Microhabitat Partitioning Among Small Passerines in a Pacific Island Bird Community". The Wilson Bulletin. 113 (3). Wilson Ornithological Society: 317–326. doi:10.1676/0043-5643(2001)113[0317:MPASPI]2.0.CO;2. ISSN 0043-5643.
- Craig, Robert J.; Pyle, Peter (2026). Billerman, Shawn M.; Keeney, Brooke K.; Rodewald, Paul G.; Schulenberg, Thomas S. (eds.). "Micronesian Myzomela (Myzomela rubratra), Version 2". Birds of the World. Cornell Lab of Ornithology. doi:10.2173/bow.micmyz1.02.
- Sachtleben, Thalia (2005). Predation and Nest Success of Forest Birds in Native and Non-Native Habitat on Saipan, Mariana Islands (MS thesis). Colorado State University. doi:10.25675/3.020863.
- Vinciguerra, Nicholas T.; Benz, Brett W.; McCullough, Jenna M.; Moyle, Robert G.; Andersen, Michael J. (2026). "Phylogenomics and Biogeography of Honeyeaters in the Genus "Myzomela" (Meliphagidae)". Molecular Phylogenetics and Evolution. 222 108644. Academic Press. Bibcode:2026MolPE.22208644V. doi:10.1016/j.ympev.2026.108644. PMID 42134768.
