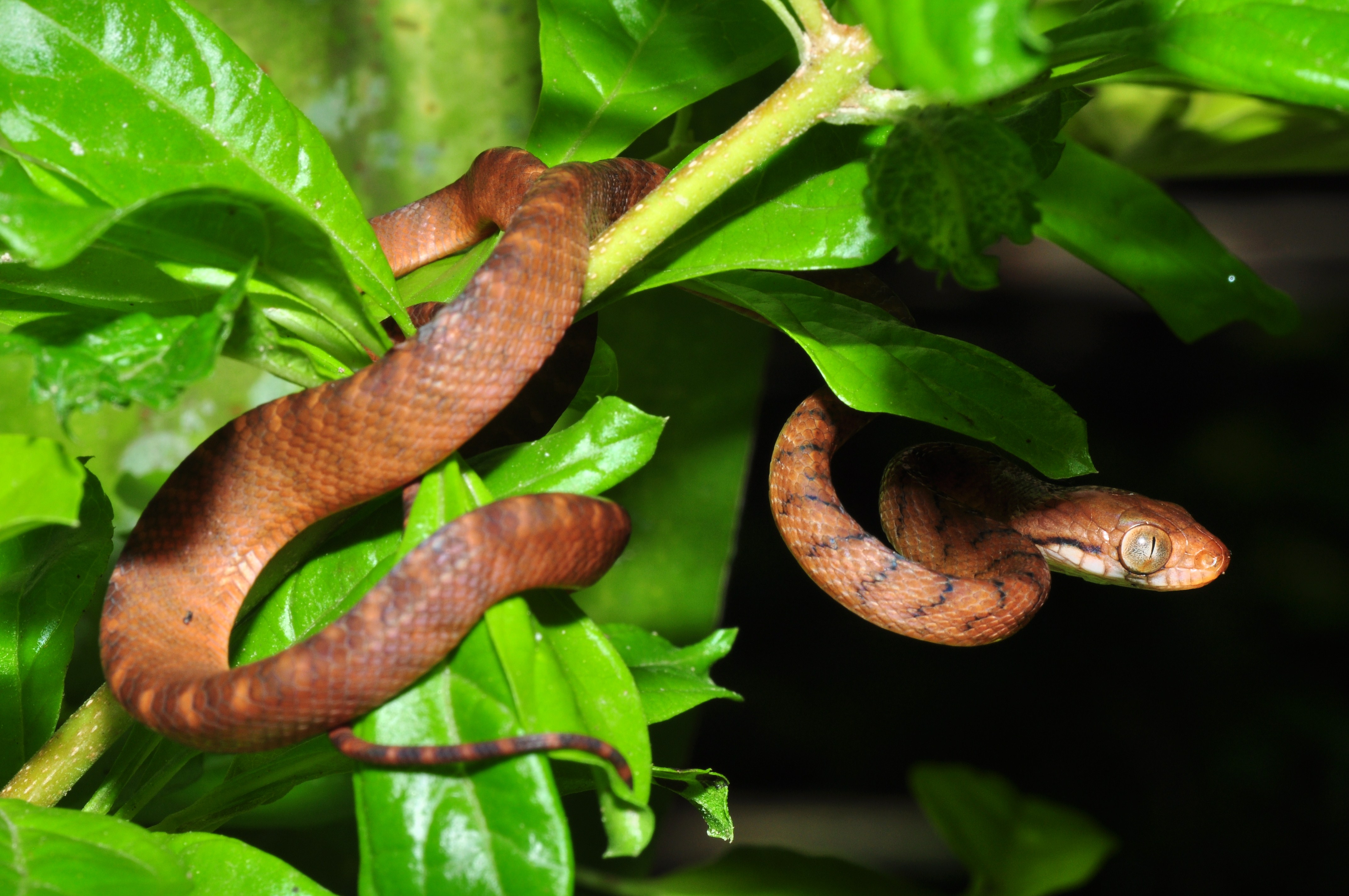

Conservation status
- Least Concern (IUCN 3.1)

Scientific classification
- Kingdom: Animalia
- Phylum: Chordata
- Class: Reptilia
- Order: Squamata
- Suborder: Serpentes
- Family: Colubridae
- Genus: Boiga
- Species: B. irregularis

Binomial name
- Boiga irregularis (Merrem, 1802)
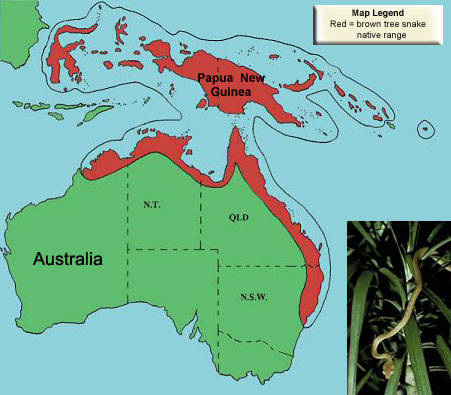

Synonyms
- Coluber irregularis Merrem, 1802; Boiga irregularis Fitzinger, 1826; Dipsas irregularis Boie, 1827; Triglyphodon irregularis Duméril & Bibron, 1854; Dipsadomorphus irregularis Boulenger, 1896

= Brown tree snake =

Species of reptile

The brown tree snake (Boiga irregularis), also known as the brown catsnake, is an arboreal rear-fanged colubrid snake native to eastern and northern coastal Australia, eastern Indonesia (Sulawesi to Papua), Papua New Guinea, and many islands in northwestern Melanesia. The snake is slender, which facilitates climbing, and can reach up to 2 metres in length. Its coloration may also vary, some being brown, green, or even red. Brown tree snakes prey on a wide range of animals, from invertebrates to birds and even some small mammals. It is one of the very few colubrids found in Australia, where elapids are more common.

Due to an accidental introduction after the events of World War II, this snake is now infamous for being an invasive species responsible for extirpating the majority of the native bird population in Guam. Currently, efforts are being made to reduce and control the population on Guam and prevent the snake from spreading to other locations. Researchers are employing various methods, including aerial baiting, to attempt to control the population, while multiple agencies continue to fund and support the species' removal.

== Description ==
The brown tree snake is a nocturnal, arboreal species that uses both visual and chemical cues when hunting, whether in the rainforest canopy or on the ground. It is a member of the subfamily Colubrinae, genus Boiga, which is a group of roughly twenty-five species that are referred to as "cat-eyed" snakes for their vertical pupils. The brown tree snake is generally 1–2 metres (3–7 ft) in length in its native range. The snake is long and slender, which facilitates its climbing ability and allows it to pass through tiny spaces in buildings, logs, and other shaded locations, where it seeks refuge during daylight. Variations in coloration occur in the snake's native range, from lightly patterned brown to yellowish/green or even beige, with red, saddle-shaped blotches. They are rear-fanged, have a large head in relation to their body, and can survive for extended periods of time without food. The median age of maturity for these snakes is estimated to be 3.1 years in males and 3.7 years in females.

Owing to the availability of prey and the lack of predators in introduced habitats such as Guam, they have been known to grow to larger sizes than their typical 1 to 2 m (3.3 to 6.6 ft) in length. The longest recorded length of this species is one found on Guam measuring 3 m (9.8 ft).

== Distribution and habitat ==
The brown tree snake is native to coastal Australia, Papua New Guinea, and many islands in northwestern Melanesia. The species occurs on variably sized islands, extending from Sulawesi in eastern Indonesia through Papua New Guinea and the Solomon Islands and into the wettest coastal areas of Northern Australia. The snakes on Guam represent the only documented reproductive population outside the native range. Since January 2016, however, four snakes have been sighted on the island of Saipan in the Northern Mariana Islands.

A separate species, Boiga flavescens, was described from Sulawesi in the nineteenth century. Subsequent authors identified both B. flavescens and B. irregularis on the island, and flavescens was synonymised with irregularis in 1985 by In den Bosch. Weinell et al. found significant DNA differences between the Sulawesi and Sundaland populations, proposing in 2021 that all members west of Weber's Line be designated B. flavescens.

The brown tree snake is not restricted to forested habitats; it also occurs in grasslands and sparsely forested areas. In Papua New Guinea, it occupies a wide variety of habitats at elevations up to 1,200 m. It is most commonly found in trees, caves, and near limestone cliffs, but frequently comes down to the ground to forage at night. It hides during the day in the crowns of palm trees, hollow logs, rock crevices, caves, and even the dark corners of thatched houses near the roof. Based on the frequency of sightings of this snake, in relation to buildings, poultry, and caged birds, the snake is considered to be common in human-disturbed habitats. Although the snake has been found in nearly all habitats on the island, it is most common in primary and secondary forest habitats on Guam.

== Diet ==
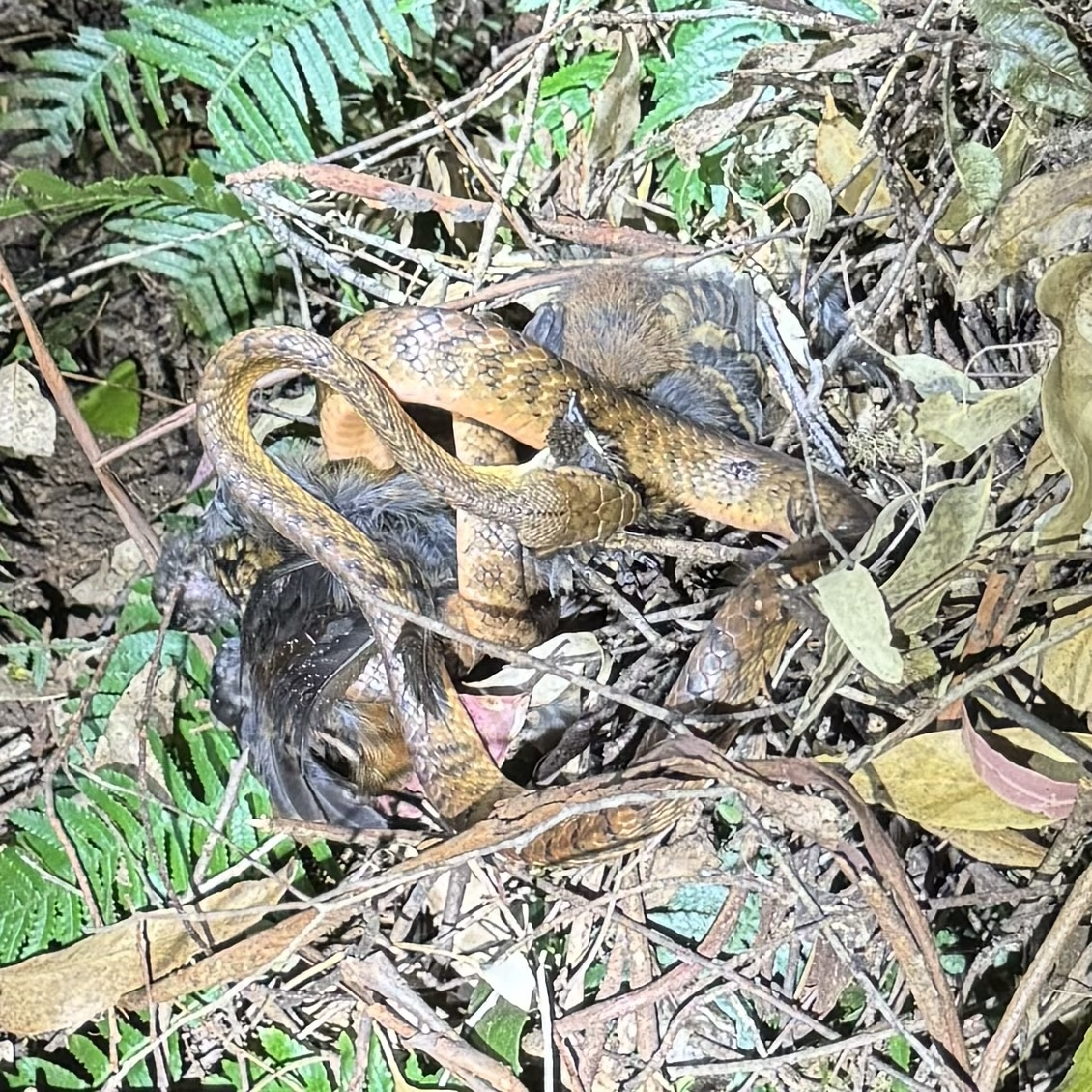
Coiling around a female Australian logrunner and its chick while feeding on another chick. In Queensland.

In its native range, the brown tree snake preys upon birds, lizards, bats, and mice and other small rodents. Those of a smaller size focus on smaller prey such as frogs and lizards, while the larger individuals prey on larger vertebrates such as mammals and birds. The larger snakes are often seen shifting their diet towards endotherms rather than consuming ectotherms due to relative prey size.

On Guam, this shift is prevalent because the island's prey is mostly larger ectotherms, such as lizards, which are the primary prey for smaller snakes and birds. The snake preys on a large variety of invertebrates, including their eggs, their young, and the adults of many of the preyed upon species. A study was done on the Guam population where 683 snakes were necropsied, and their stomach contents were examined. The majority of stomach content consisted of reptiles and reptile eggs, followed by birds and bird eggs, and then lastly mammals. The snake also preys on shrews on Guam, and threatens native bird and lizard species.

== Behavior ==
=== Reproduction ===
The reproductive characteristics of the brown tree snake have not been widely studied. The female is known to produce 4 to 12 oblong eggs, 42–47 mm (1.7–1.9 in) long and 18–22 mm (0.71–0.87 in) wide with leathery shells. Females may produce up to two clutches per year, depending upon seasonal variations in climate and prey abundance. The female deposits the eggs in hollow logs, rock crevices, and other sites where they are likely protected from drying and high temperatures. Eggs can then hatch around 90 days after being laid. Unlike the native population in Australia, populations in Guam may reproduce year-round, as there is no evidence of seasonality in the population.

There have been observations of courtship behaviour in brown tree snakes, some of which differ from those of other snakes within their family. Male courtship behaviour involves tongue-flicking, head-jerking, and chin-rubbing on the female in preparation of mating. If females are receptive, mating will take place almost immediately. Interestingly, the female brown tree snakes have been observed to display courtship behaviours that previously have only been used by male individuals. These behaviours include the tongue-flicking and head-jerking behaviours, which can lead to the female mounting the male to elicit courting behaviour from the other snake. Oftentimes, if females displayed these behaviours towards a male, the male would respond and continue until copulation occurred. Female snakes also displayed a tail-lifting behaviour in which they release cloacal secretions in response to male courtship behaviour.

=== Predatory behaviour ===
The brown tree snake is a generalist feeder known to eat a wide variety of foods. When threatened, it is highly aggressive and tends to lunge and strike the aggressor repeatedly. The snake has numerous teeth, but only the last two on each side of the upper jaw have grooves that inject venom when it bites. Therefore, the snake's mouth must be opened as wide as possible to insert and expose its fangs. The snake uses a chewing movement to inject the venom by means of capillary action along the grooved fangs. The venom is used to subdue and kill prey that the snake feeds on; however, it is not considered dangerous to adult humans. In addition to subduing its victim with its venom, the brown tree snake often wraps its body around the prey, like a constrictor, to immobilise the prey while chewing and consuming the animal.

=== Lasso locomotion ===
A 2021 study found that brown tree snakes in Guam can use "lasso locomotion" to climb large smooth cylinders. This type of locomotion has not previously been observed in snakes. This novel form of movement has been observed to be physically demanding, as snakes seen utilising it make frequent stops and move more slowly than other forms of locomotion.

=== Seasonal activity ===
In the northern Australian city of Darwin, the brown tree snake is significantly more likely to be encountered in suburban areas during the wet season months of January–March. This is indicative of shifts in snake behaviour or movement across the year, and may partially be driven by differences in seasonal detection probability. Potentially, during months of low activity, brown tree snakes may remain in tree canopies, where detection by the public is unlikely.

== Venom ==
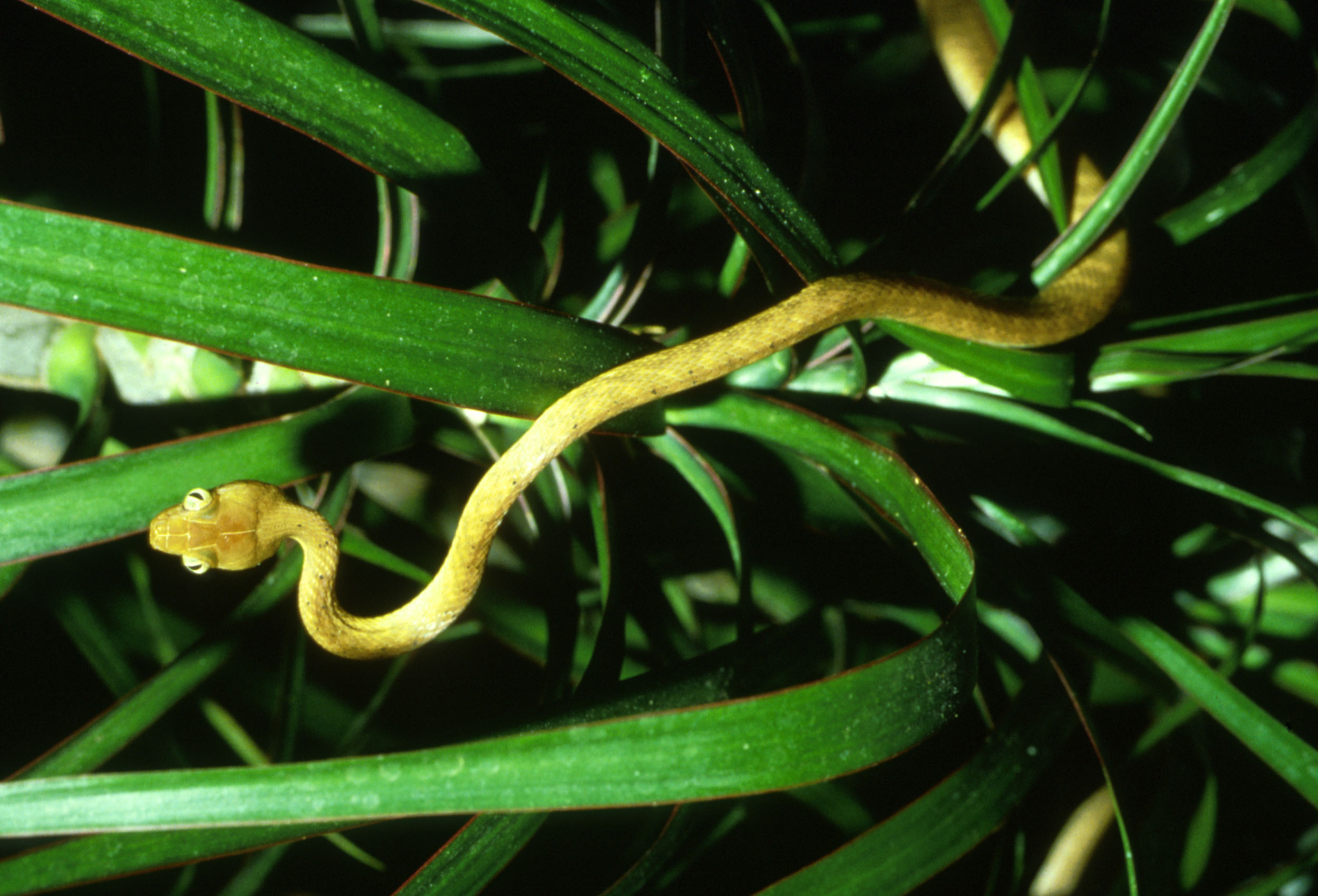
Invasive species on Guam

The brown tree snake is a nocturnal, rear-fanged colubrid, possessing two small, grooved fangs at the rear of the mouth. Due to the placement of the fangs and their grooved rather than hollow architecture, the venom is difficult to convey into a bite on a human, and thus is only delivered in small doses. The venom appears to be weakly neurotoxic and possibly cytotoxic with localised effects that are trivial for adult humans; serious medical consequences have been limited to children, who are more susceptible because of their low body mass. The snake has been reported as aggressive, but is not considered dangerous to an adult human. The venom seems to be primarily used to subdue lizards, which can be more easily positioned in the rear of the mouth for venom delivery.

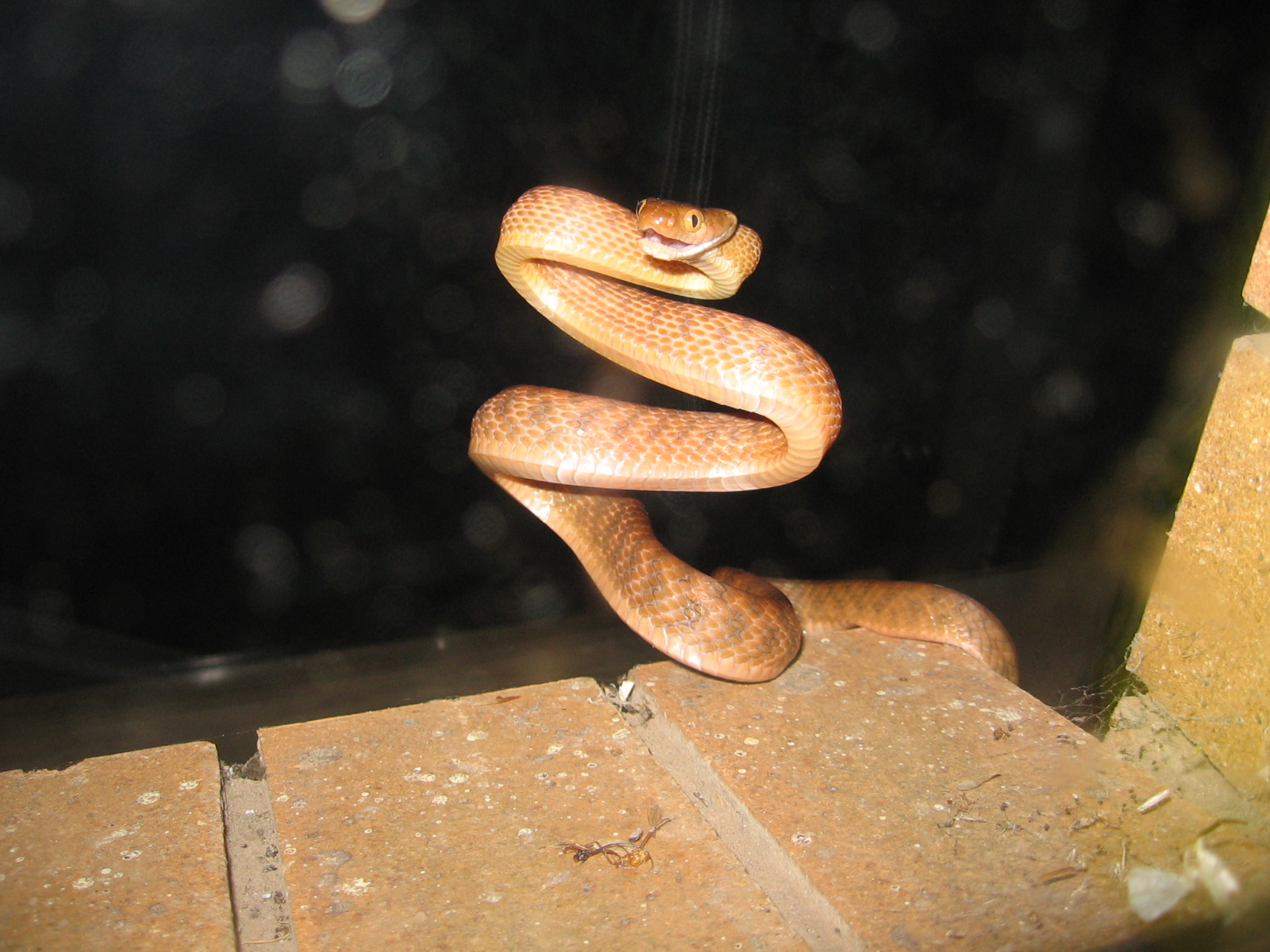
Brown tree snake, Queensland, in characteristic "S-posture"

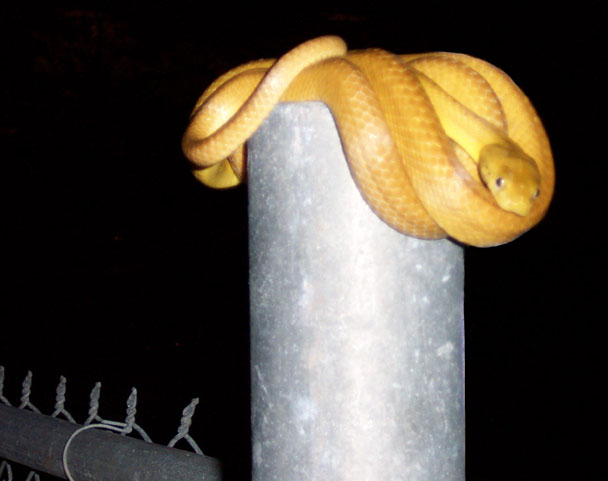
Brown tree snake on a fence post on Guam

== Invasive species ==
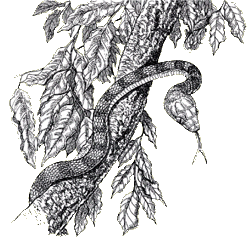

Shortly after World War II, and before 1952, the brown tree snake was accidentally transported from its native range in the South Pacific to Guam, probably as a stowaway in ship cargo or by crawling into the landing gear of Guam-bound aircraft. As a result of abundant prey resources on Guam and the absence of natural predators apart from the native Mariana monitor and feral pigs, brown tree snake populations reached unprecedented numbers. Snakes caused the extirpation of most of the native forest vertebrate species; thousands of power outages affecting private, commercial, and military activities; widespread loss of people's pets; and considerable emotional trauma to residents and visitors alike when snakes invaded human habitats with the potential for envenomation of small children. To minimise this threat, trained dogs are used to search, locate, and remove brown tree snakes before outbound military and commercial cargo and transportation vessels leave the island.

Numerous sightings of this species have been reported on other islands including Wake Island, Tinian, Rota, Okinawa, Diego Garcia, Hawaii, and even Texas in the continental United States. Hawaii is especially at heavy risk from the snake, as direct military flights between Guam and Hawaii are allowed. Brown tree snakes are regularly intercepted at landing areas. A successful introduction could pose an immense threat to the already highly threatened endemic birds of the islands. An incipient population was thought to be established on Saipan after sightings around the port; however, after 20 years without a sighting it appears that Saipan's biosecurity inspections have worked and the island is free of them. Paracetamol has been used to help eradicate the snake on Guam.

=== Physiological evidence for reproductive suppression ===
Environmental stressors such as lack of shelter, climate change, overcrowding, and loss of prey have been studied as primary causes of diminished snake density, as they correlate directly with snakes' reproductive success. Current research on the breeding patterns of the brown tree snake is being conducted in hopes of further understanding how these environmental stressors are affecting the population density of the snake on Guam.

A study conducted by I.T. Moore predicted that low body condition would correlate to high levels of stress hormones and low levels of sex steroids in free-living brown tree snakes on Guam when compared with the native snake population in Australia and snakes held in captivity on Guam. After extensive research, the body condition of free-living snakes was found to differ significantly from that of native and captive snakes. The results determined, "depressed body condition and elevated plasmacorticosteron levels in the free-living animals suggest that a lack of food resources was placing individuals under chronic stress, resulting in suppression of the reproductive system." The study suggested that snakes living under stressful conditions, such as high population densities or low prey resources, had suppressed reproduction at multiple stages, including steroidogenesis and gametogenesis.

=== Current status ===
Currently, the brown tree snake population on Guam is declining with an equilibrium population size predicted to be roughly 30 to 50 per hectare (12 to 20/acre). The decline in snake population may be identified as a result of depleted food resources, adult mortality, and/or suppressed reproduction. The brown tree snake population on Guam has exceeded the carrying capacity of the island.

=== Species status and effect ===
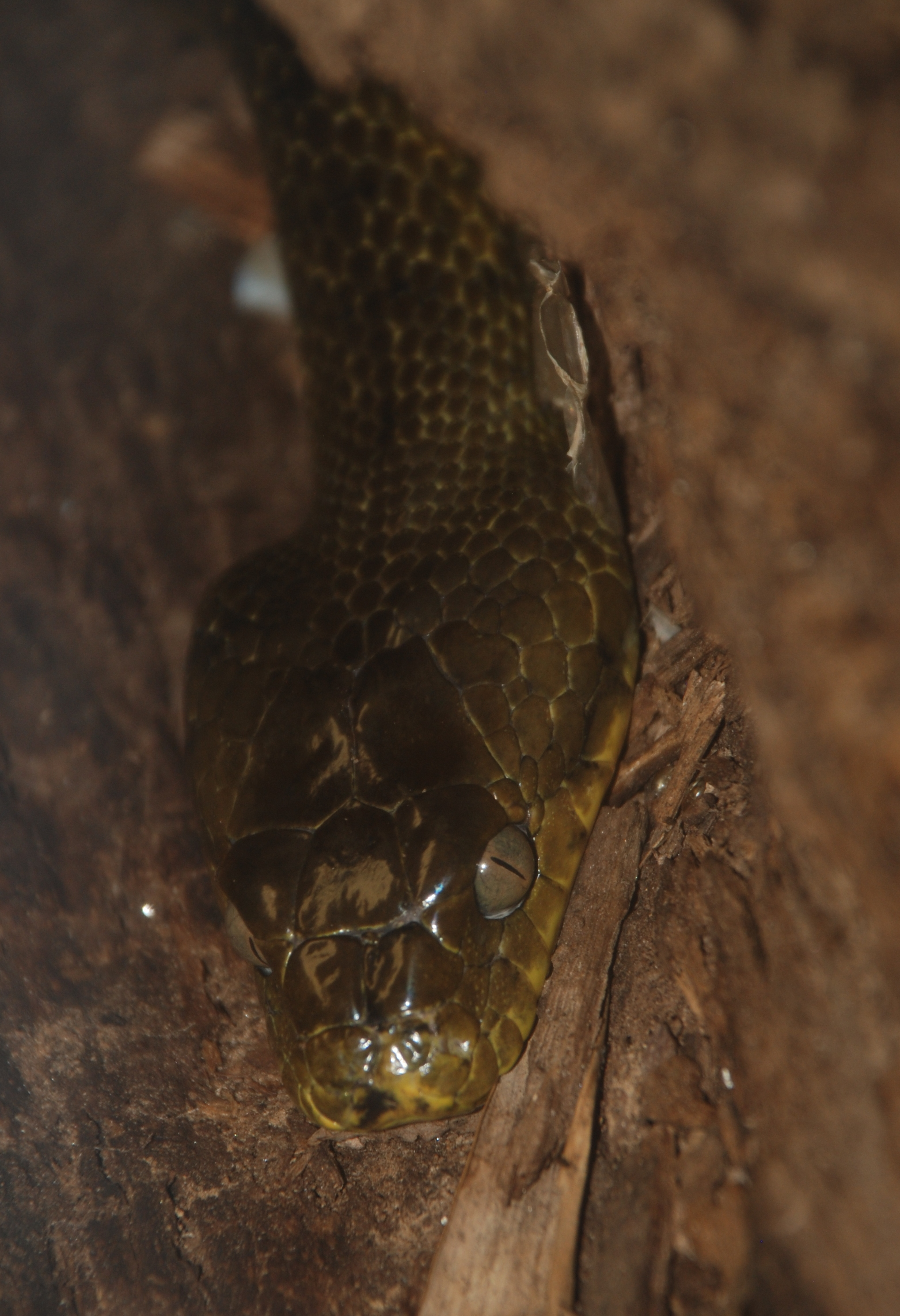
Boiga irregularis from the National Zoo, Washington DC

==== Effect of early introduction ====
The introduction of the brown tree snake to Guam after WWII has had a significant impact on the island's community dynamics. Upon its introduction, the brown tree snake population exploded and spread across Guam. The brown tree snake population on the island has reached peak densities exceeding 100 per hectare (40/acre). This population spike was caused by the copious amount of resources newly available to the brown tree snake upon its introduction. The limitations on the snake's population in its native range are predominantly food-based. The snake's food source is far more limited in its native range than on the island of Guam, as the prey in its natural range boasts significantly more natural defences to the snake than the prey on Guam.

The primary population affected by the snake's introduction was native bird species. The introduction of the brown tree snake into Guam has resulted in extinction of twelve native bird species in total, such as the Mariana fruit dove, the Guam flycatcher, the Micronesian rufous fantail, and the Micronesian myzomela. The Guam National Wildlife Refuge is attempting to prevent the extinction of additional bird species endangered by the snake. Other species significantly affected by the invasion of these snakes were small lizards and small mammals. Research has indicated a direct correlation between the spread of these snakes across the island and the decrease in the populations of these native species. Furthermore, the introduction of the brown tree snake has had an indirect negative impact on plant diversity, as its intense predatory nature has decreased populations of vital pollinators, including native birds and fruit bats. Data collected from nearby islands lacking brown tree snake populations depict a significant difference in vegetative species richness; that is, islands close to and similar to Guam, in which the brown tree snake has not been introduced, have greater vegetative species diversity. At War in the Pacific National Historical Park, conservation efforts now focus on isolated areas such as Asan Beach Park, where the ocean and nearby roads serve as natural buffers against reinvasion. These protected zones may offer a future opportunity to reintroduce endangered native bird species, two of which – Mariana swiftlet and Micronesian starling – are the only native forest birds still surviving on Guam.

Overall, the vertebrate fauna and native flora of Guam have suffered tremendously because of the introduction of the brown tree snake.

==== Economic damage on Guam ====
The negative effects of the brown tree snake are not limited to the extirpation of native species and fauna; they have also had sizeable effects on Guam's economy. One of these economic facets includes Guam's energy sector. The snake, due to its large invasive population, caused almost 2,000 power outages in a 20-year span. The outages, depending on the scale, can cause millions of dollars of revenue loss to Guam and can affect either the whole island or smaller parts of it. According to a study by Thomas H. Frittz, there were an average of 133 power outages per year from 1991 to 1997 caused by the brown tree snake. A majority of these outages were considered major disruptions to the island's power grid. The current estimate of total economic loss due to the outages caused by these snakes is 4.5 million dollars. The snakes have also become attuned to the predation of poultry, which is another important sector of Guam's economy.

=== Population control methods ===
Due to the success of the brown tree snakes on Guam, there have been many efforts to eradicate the invasive population and prevent its spread to other places, including the mainland United States and other islands, such as Hawaii. Other goals for controlling this species include intercepting snakes that are either coming to or leaving Guam, such as those that stow away on planes, protecting sensitive areas on Guam from further destruction, and exterminating any other populations that exist outside their native range. To support these initiatives, the National Wildlife Research Center (NWRC) has received long-term funding since 1995 from the Department of Defense's Legacy Resource Management Program, which supports conservation projects on military properties across the U.S. These lands which are home to endangered species and delicate ecosystems benefit from efforts that balance ecological preservation with national defense operations. Additional funding has come from the Department of Interior's Office of Insular Affairs.

Current control techniques and search methods for the brown tree snake include trapping, spotlight searches, baiting and poisoning, the use of search dogs, barriers, fumigation, and reducing prey availability. There is also a public outreach campaign that raises the issue of the snake to the regular public and the military population. Educational tools such as workshops, demonstrations, and brochures are used to raise awareness and keep the public informed.

Additionally, in 2018, the U.S. Department of the Interior allocated $2.8 million for brown tree snake control efforts across Guam, the CNMI, and Hawaii. This funding supported initiatives such as bait manufacturing, public education campaigns, and aerial delivery of toxic bait capsules containing acetaminophen. Agencies such as the U.S. Geological Survey have been involved in developing landscape-scale suppression tactics and detection tools to support early intervention.

More recently, in 2021, the Department of the Interior announced an additional $4.1 million to support control efforts across the Pacific region. These funds are being used to implement interdiction at ports, expand canine inspection units, and support rapid response activities, especially in high-risk areas like Saipan, Tinian, and Cocos Island.

==== Capturing and poisoning methods ====
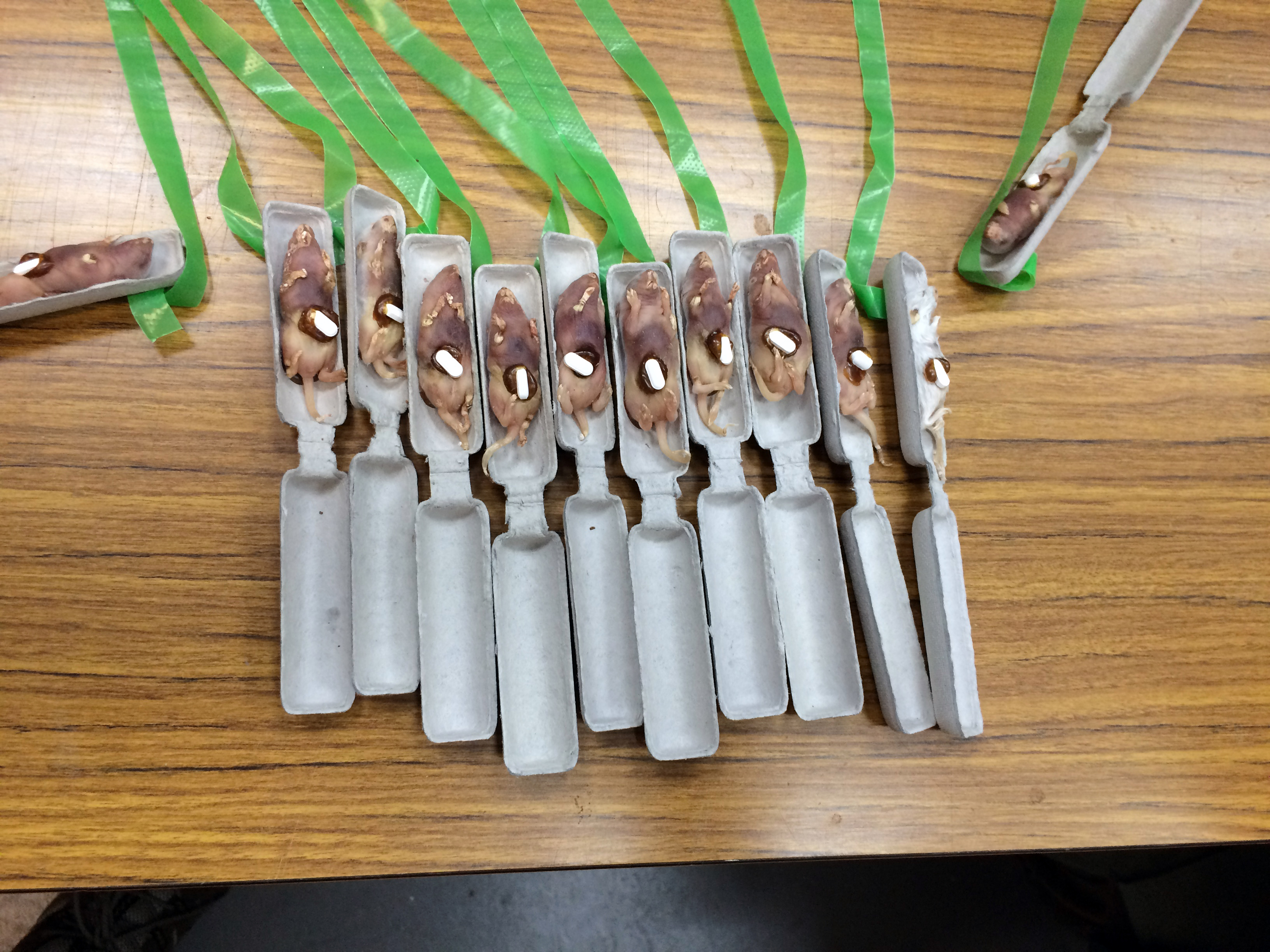
Biodegradable aerial bait cartridges consisting of a dead mouse and 80 mg acetaminophen tablets, designed to catch on trees in areas where brown tree snakes are invasive

Given the environmental impact of the brown tree snake, studies have attempted to develop a capture methodology to mitigate its detrimental effects. The use of mice as bait has shown considerable reduction effects when combined with acetaminophen, to which the snake is particularly sensitive, in a mark-recapture experiment leading to potential widespread application in Guam. When utilising a precisely defined treated plot with results corrected for immigration and emigration, the additive effect of both acetaminophen and mice usage shows a 0% survival rate of the brown tree snake. In the study, 80 mg of acetaminophen was inserted into mouse carcasses. In addition, one study showed that increasing inter-trap spacing would not only increase efficiency, but also not compromise efficacy as 20-, 30-, and 40-metre long perimeter trap lines were compared and no difference was found. Another study echoed the aforementioned notion of increasing inter-trap spacing.

In a large-scale field trial initiated in 2013, scientists deployed these toxic mouse baits via aerial drop across two separate 55-hectare (140-acre) forest plots on Guam. A third site of equal size was left untreated to serve as a control. Throughout the 16-month experiment, the National Wildlife Research Center (NWRC) tracked both snake and rodent populations to evaluate the baiting strategy's effectiveness and whether it caused any unintended environmental impacts.

An additional aerial baiting trial was employed in May and June 2019. Researchers selected 30 brown tree snakes for the study, surgically implanting motion-sensitive transmitters in each snake before releasing them back to the area where they were captured. In the following weeks, the researchers aerially applied nearly 20,000 bait cartridges within the designated study plot. The study found that 11 of the 30 tagged snakes died during the toxin treatment period, with no snakes dying during the non-treatment period, leading researchers to conclude that there is strong, data-driven evidence of an additive, size-based treatment effect on mortality. Smaller snakes experienced a greater treatment effect, but the probability of mortality during the treatment period was higher for snakes of all sizes.

Further fieldwork highlighted similar limitations. When a new population of brown tree snakes was discovered in 2020 on Cocos Island, researchers explored various control methods, including cage trapping and acetaminophen-laced carrion baits placed both on the ground and suspended in trees. Despite more than 2,400 bait nights and 10,000 trap nights – monitored with time-lapse cameras – no baits were consumed, and only a single snake was trapped. These findings suggested that traditional baiting and trapping methods were ineffective in that environment. Scientists attributed the failure not to snake scarcity but to the abundance of preferred natural prey, such as large geckos and birds. As a result, researchers plan to continue manual removal efforts and to explore whether live bird lures might prove more effective in future attempts.

==== Predation on brown tree snakes ====
An investigation was conducted to identify predators of the brown tree snake that could serve as a means of population control. In this study, two actual predators and 55 potential predators were identified: the two actual predators were the red-bellied black snake and the cane toad. Actual predators were identified by evidence showing that they would actually prey upon and consume the brown tree snake in a natural habitat whereas potential predators were identified as species that were only physically capable of consuming the brown tree snake. The research collected in this study suggested that even with the introduction of brown tree snake predation, it was unlikely this would serve as an effective brown tree snake population control method. One reason for this conclusion was that the identified actual predators of the brown tree snake are generalist feeders and would cause further detriment to other native island species.

Another possible negative outcome of introducing species as a control method for the brown tree snake population is predation by brown tree snakes on juvenile cane toads and red-bellied snakes, because they are opportunistic, generalist feeders. This investigation determined that the environmental and ecological risk associated with the introduction of these predators was too high to implement. Lastly, red-bellied snakes could pose a threat to the health of humans. The cost of introducing such predatory species outweighs the benefits and is not practical.

==== Use of airsoft guns ====
The use of firearms is a control method often paired with efforts against invasive vertebrate species, including snakes. A 2018 study conducted at the Brown Treesnake Project laboratory on Guam examined the use of airsoft guns, a lower-powered, less expensive alternative to firearms, as a form of lethal control for the brown tree snake. Using both dead and live snakes, the study looked for evidence of wounds and how they affected the snake's bodies as well as the live snake's reactions after being shot. The study found that higher-powered guns with larger ammunition were preferable for controlling brown tree snakes.
