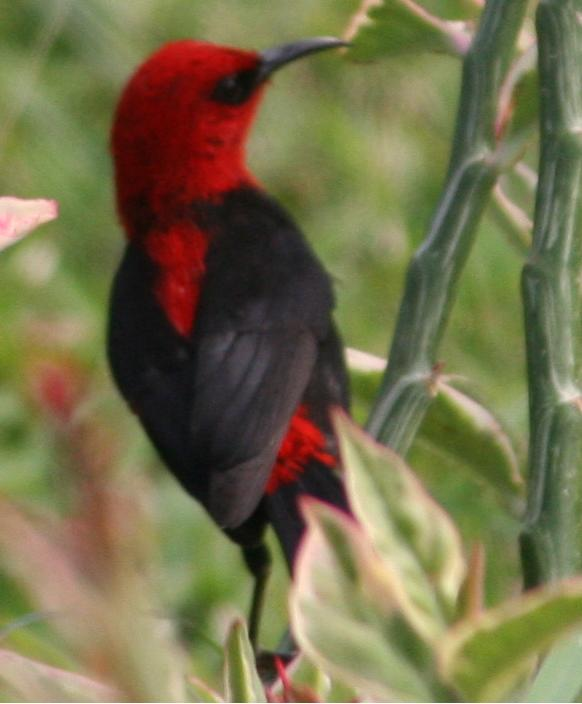
- M. c. tenuis, Vanuatu

Conservation status
- Least Concern (IUCN 3.1)

Scientific classification
- Kingdom: Animalia
- Phylum: Chordata
- Class: Aves
- Order: Passeriformes
- Family: Meliphagidae
- Genus: Myzomela
- Species: M. cardinalis

Binomial name
- Myzomela cardinalis (Gmelin, JF, 1788)

= Cardinal myzomela =

Species of bird

The cardinal myzomela (Myzomela cardinalis) a species of passerine bird in the honeyeater family Meliphagidae. It is named for the scarlet color of the male. It is permanent resident to the Loyalty Islands of New Caledonia, Temotu and Makira-Ulawa of the Solomon Islands, and the entirety of Vanuatu. Its natural habitats are subtropical or tropical moist lowland forest and subtropical or tropical mangrove forest. It frequents areas with flowers, such as gardens. This is a small, active bird, measuring about 13 cm (5.1 in) from bill to tail. Males are red and black in coloration, females are grayish-olive, sometimes with a red cap or red head. Its long, curved bill is especially adapted for reaching into flowers for nectar. It has sometimes been considered as conspecific with the Samoan myzomela (Myzomela nigriventris).

== Taxonomy ==
The cardinal myzomela was formally described in 1788 by the German naturalist Johann Friedrich Gmelin in his revised and expanded edition of Carl Linnaeus's Systema Naturae. He placed it with the treecreepers in the genus Certhia and coined the binomial name Certhia cardinalis. Gmelin based his description on the "cardinal creeper" that had been described and illustrated in 1782 by the English ornithologist John Latham in his book A General Synopsis of Birds. Latham had access to a specimen in the Leverian Museum that had been brought to London from the island of Tanna in Vanuata in the South Pacific Ocean. The cardinal myzomela is now one of 41 honeyeaters placed in the genus Myzomela that was introduced in 1827 by Nicholas Vigors and Thomas Horsfield.

Seven subspecies are recognised:

- M. c. pulcherrima Ramsay, EP, 1881 – Makira (or San Cristóbal), Ugi and Three Sisters (north of central Makira; southeast Solomon Islands)
- M. c. sanfordi Mayr, 1931 – Rennell Island (south Solomon Islands)
- M. c. sanctaecrucis Sarasin, 1913 – Temotu (formerly Santa Cruz Islands, southeast Solomon Islands) and Torres Islands (north Vanuatu)
- M. c. tucopiae Mayr, 1937 – Tikopia (far southeast Solomon Islands)
- M. c. tenuis Mayr, 1937 – Banks Islands to Efate (north to central Vanuatu)
- M. c. cardinalis (Gmelin, JF, 1788) – Erromango, Tanna and Aneityum (south Vanuatu)
- M. c. lifuensis Layard, EL & Layard, ELC, 1878 – Loyalty Islands (New Caledonia)

The Samoan myzomela (Myzomela nigriventris) has sometimes been considered as a subspecies. Populations from elsewhere have been recently separated, e.g. as the Micronesian myzomela.
