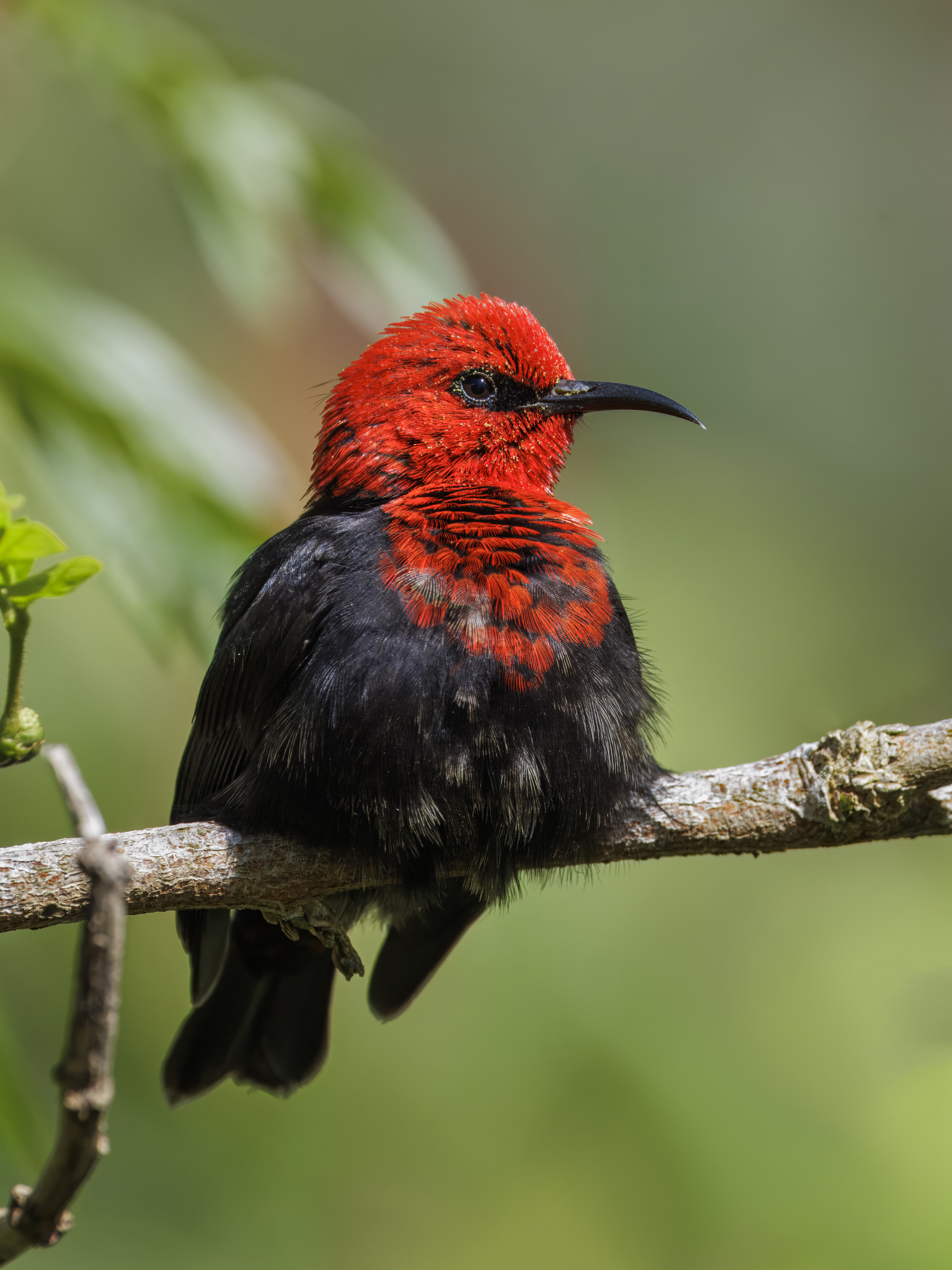
- Male, Upolu, Samoa Islands

Conservation status
- Not evaluated (IUCN 3.1)

Scientific classification
- Kingdom: Animalia
- Phylum: Chordata
- Class: Aves
- Order: Passeriformes
- Family: Meliphagidae
- Genus: Myzomela
- Species: M. nigriventris

Binomial name
- Myzomela nigriventris Peale, 1849

= Samoan myzomela =

Species of bird

The Samoan myzomela (Myzomela nigriventris) (Segasegamau’u) is a species of passerine bird in the honeyeater family Meliphagidae that is found on the Samoan islands of Upolu, Savaiʻi and Tutuila.

Its natural habitats are subtropical or tropical moist lowland forest and subtropical or tropical mangrove forest. It frequents areas with flowers, such as gardens. This is a small, active bird, measuring about 10–12.5 cm (3.9–4.9 in) in overall length. Males are black with a bright red head and breast. Females are brownish-olive, with scattered patches of red on the lower rump and back. Its long, curved bill is especially adapted for reaching into flowers for nectar.

== Taxonomy ==
The Samoan myzomela was formally described in 1849 by the American naturalist Titian Peale based on a specimen collected when the United States Exploring Expedition visited the Samoan Islands in the south Pacific. Peale coined the currect binomial name Myzomela nigriventris where the specific epithet combines the Latin niger meaning "black" with venter, venris meaning "belly". The species is monotypic: no subspecies are recognised.

The Samoan myzomela was formerly considered to be a subspecies of the more widely distributed cardinal myzomela (Myzomela cardinalis) but is now treated as a separate species based on the differences in vocalizations and the marked differences in female plumage.
