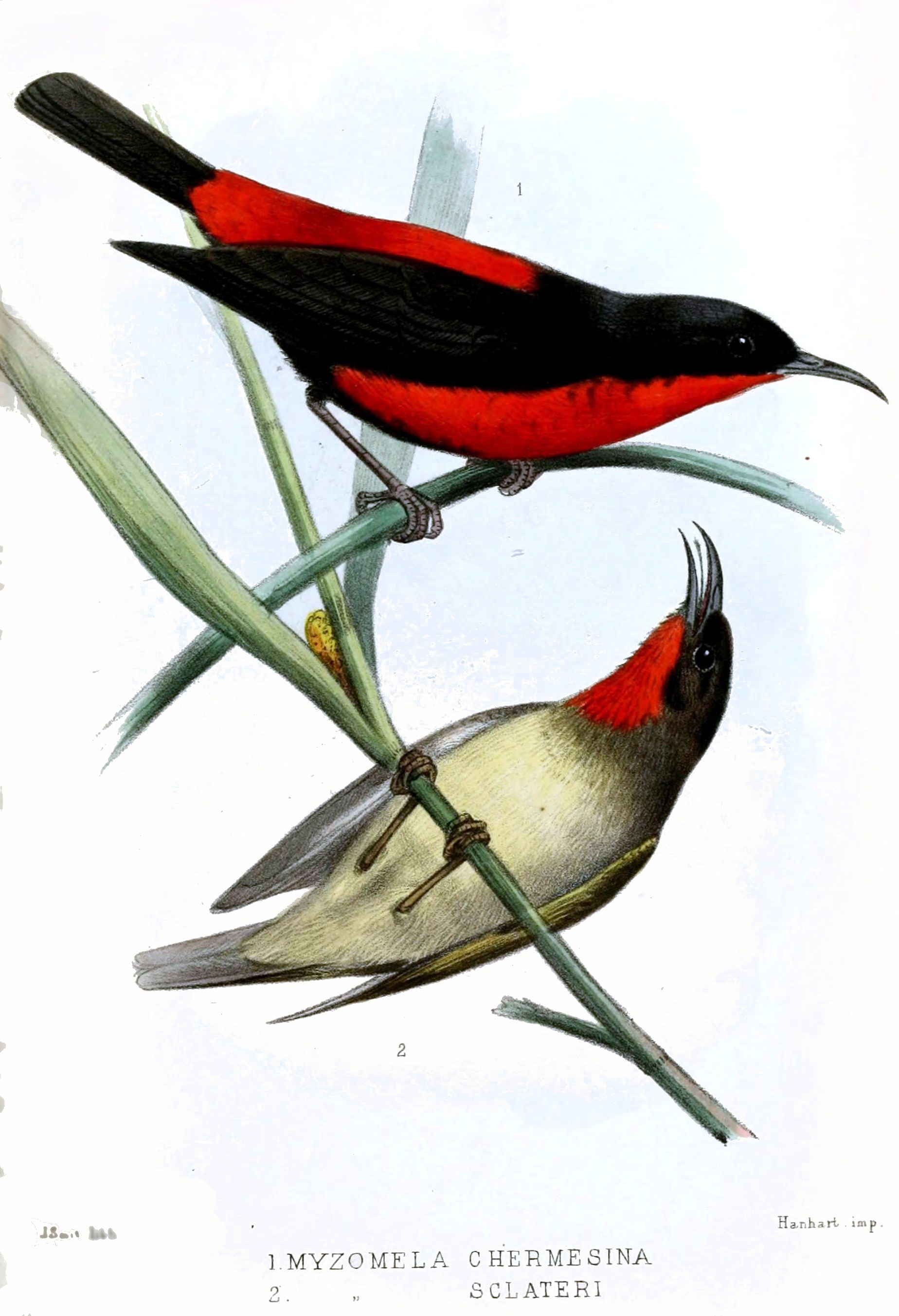
- Illustration (bird above)

Conservation status
- Vulnerable (IUCN 3.1)

Scientific classification
- Kingdom: Animalia
- Phylum: Chordata
- Class: Aves
- Order: Passeriformes
- Family: Meliphagidae
- Genus: Myzomela
- Species: M. chermesina

Binomial name
- Myzomela chermesina Gray, 1846

= Rotuma myzomela =

Species of bird

The Rotuma myzomela (Myzomela chermesina) is a species of bird in the family Meliphagidae. It is endemic to the island of Rotuma in the far north of Fiji.

Its natural habitats are tropical moist lowland forests, secondary forest and coconut plantations. The species is tolerant of habitat loss but is listed as vulnerable due to its tiny range.
