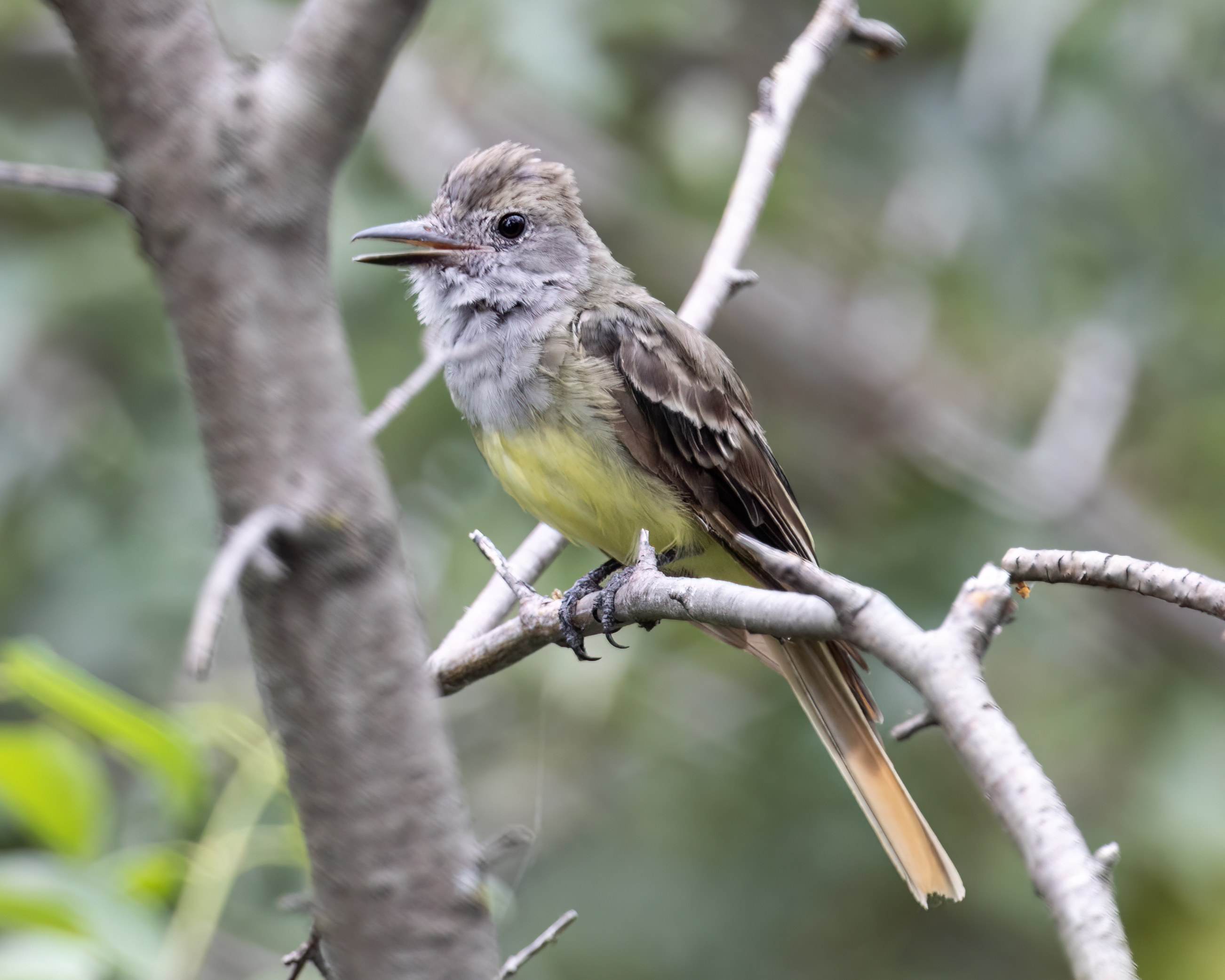

Conservation status
- Least Concern (IUCN 3.1)

Scientific classification
- Kingdom: Animalia
- Phylum: Chordata
- Class: Aves
- Order: Passeriformes
- Family: Tyrannidae
- Genus: Myiarchus
- Species: M. crinitus

Binomial name
- Myiarchus crinitus (Linnaeus, 1758)
- Breeding Migration Year-round Non-breeding

Synonyms
- Turdus crinitus Linnaeus, 1758

Audio
- Myiarchus crinitus Great Crested Flycatcher Recorded at the Cayuga Shores Wildlife Management Area, 05-17-2026 06:30 a.m.

= Great crested flycatcher =

Species of bird

The great crested flycatcher (Myiarchus crinitus) is a large insect-eating bird of the tyrant flycatcher family. It is the most widespread member of the genus Myiarchus in North America, and is found over most of the eastern and mid-western portions of the continent. It dwells mostly in the treetops and rarely is found on the ground.

== Taxonomy ==
The great crested flycatcher was formally described in 1758 by the Swedish naturalist Carl Linnaeus in the tenth edition of his Systema Naturae. He placed it with the thrushes in the genus Turdus and coined the binomial name Turdus crinitus. The specific epithet crinitus is Latin and means "long-haired" (from crinis meaning "hair") Linnaeus based his account on the "crested fly-catcher" that had been described and illustrated by the English naturalist Mark Catesby in his book The Natural History of Carolina, Florida and the Bahama Islands. Linnaeus specified the type locality as "America" but this was restricted to South Carolina by Outram Bangs in 1898. It is now one of 22 species placed in the genus Myiarchus that was introduced by the German ornithologist Jean Cabanis in 1844. The species is monotypic: no subspecies are recognised.

== Description ==
Adult great crested flycatchers usually measure between 17–21 cm (6.7–8.3 in) in length with a wingspan of around 34 cm (13 in). This bird usually weighs between 27–40 g (0.95–1.41 oz). There is no sexual dimorphism. All adults are brownish on the upperparts with yellow underparts; they have a long rusty brown tail and a bushy crest. Their throat and breast are grey.

Males will sing a three-part song composed of two short whistles: a wheerreep followed by a higher-pitched whee, and a soft low churr. This song is meant to be heard by a mate at short distances, indicating periods of low disturbance and stress typically intensifying just before dawn. It is appropriately named "dawn song" (or twilight song).

In addition to the dawn song, great crested flycatcher also produce various calls, a series of fast ascending huit, huit, huit is given in moments of stress or excitement during interactions of between neighbours. The most characteristic sound is perhaps a single loud whee-eep, called out to communicate between mates or parents and young birds. A faster repetition of this call often signal predators in proximity to nests and young. A rapid succession of harsh-sounds rasps signals alarm or stress often heard during territorial disputes between neighbouring birds

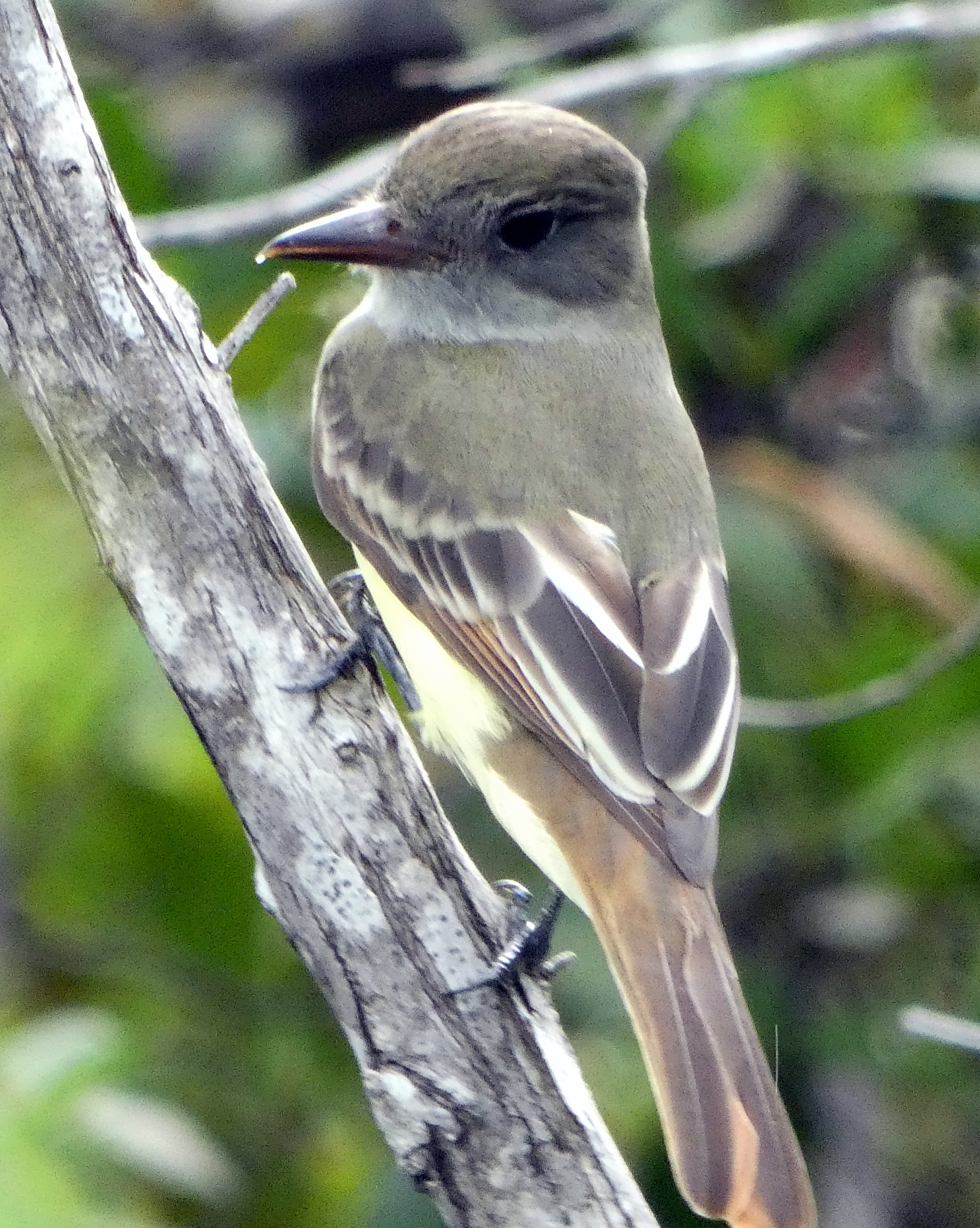
Great crested flycatcher in Florida Keys

== Distribution and habitat ==
The great crested flycatcher's habitat selection may vary slightly with different populations, but can be most often found breeding in deciduous forests and at edges of clearings and mixed woodlands. They also show a tendency to favour landscapes with open canopy, such as second growth forests or woodlands that have been subjected to selective cutting, and also appears to avoid coniferous dominant habitats such as the Canadian boreal forest.

The summer breeding ground covers all eastern, mid-eastern and parts of central United States, including Northern and Southern parts of Florida, parts of Texas, central Oklahoma, and eastern and central North Dakota. In Canada, it is limited to southern Manitoba, extreme southern portions of the St-Lawrence forest of Ontario, Quebec, northeast Nova Scotia and parts of Prince Edward Island.

Its winter range includes most of southern Mexico and the Yucatán Peninsula, and extends along the coasts of Central America. In southern peninsular Florida, Great Crested flycatcher can be found year-round. They migrate to Mexico and South America, as well as to Florida and the Caribbean.

== Behavior ==
=== Food and feeding ===
The great crested flycatcher is primarily an insectivore, with insects and other invertebrates making up for the majority of its diet, but will also consume small portion of small fruits and berries. Despite the "flycatcher" of the bird's name, flies, along with spiders, make up only a small percentage of its diet; it prefers prey such as butterflies, moths, beetles, grasshoppers, crickets, and bees and wasps.

Great crested flycatchers will use a variety of hunting tactics, although the most common method observed is a rather passive sit-and-wait strategy. Perched in high canopies, they search in all direction often accompanied by a characteristic head bobbing. Once they have spotted a potential prey, they swoop down and will pursue if they missed on the first dive. They can also be seen abruptly braking and hovering, picking insects or small fruits off of leaves, trunks or other surfaces, sometimes crashing into the foliage in the process. Fruits and berries, when consumed are swallowed whole and the pits later regurgitated.

=== Breeding ===
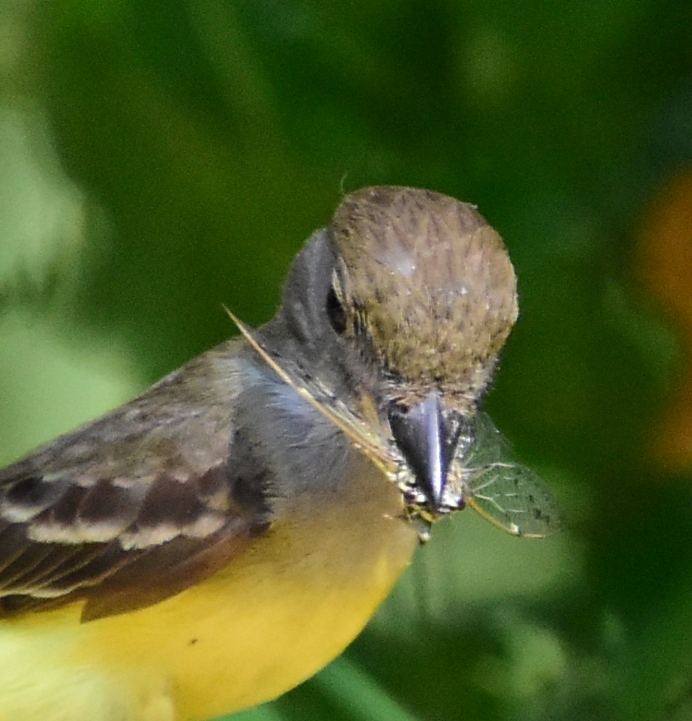
Adult in Eastern Maryland with its catch for the nestlings

Nest building begins as early as mid April for populations of the southern distribution, and as late as June for northern populations (i.e. Manitoba).

Great crested flycatchers are socially monogamous with chances of pairs reforming in following years, given that both members of the pair survive the winter. Pairs have been observed to attempt copulation from the beginning of nest building all the way to the hatching of young, sometimes during the nest building process; this is thought to be a strategy developed by males in order to prevent female infidelity. Mating ritual for the great crested flycatcher is described as males swooping down from a high perch in order to initiate mating with females, sometimes hovering near hideaway if female retreats, before returning to perch and repeating diving routine until mating is successful.

Although both parents will inspect potential sites, building of the nest is done almost entirely by the female, while the male closely guards its mate. Cavities that are large enough in size and opening are the preferred nesting sites, whether naturally occurring or excavated by other species (8) as well as use nesting boxes and other man-made structures. Most chosen cavities are situated between 2 and 6 m (6 ft 7 in and 19 ft 8 in) off the forest ground (11,15). The nest itself is built within 2 to 4 days and is composed mostly of vegetation and plant fibers, such as grasses, moss, leaves, but also pieces of animal fur and feathers, pieces of shed snakeskin, and artificial materials (ex: strings, tape, cloth, and plastic objects). The inner diameter ranges from 7–9 cm.

Great crested flycatchers lay a single clutch of 4-8 eggs, which are incubated on average for two weeks by the female only. After hatching, nestlings will typically spend another two weeks in the nest before fledging. During this time, nestlings are fed an insect dominated diet by both parents, although females will make more frequent visits.

== Gallery ==
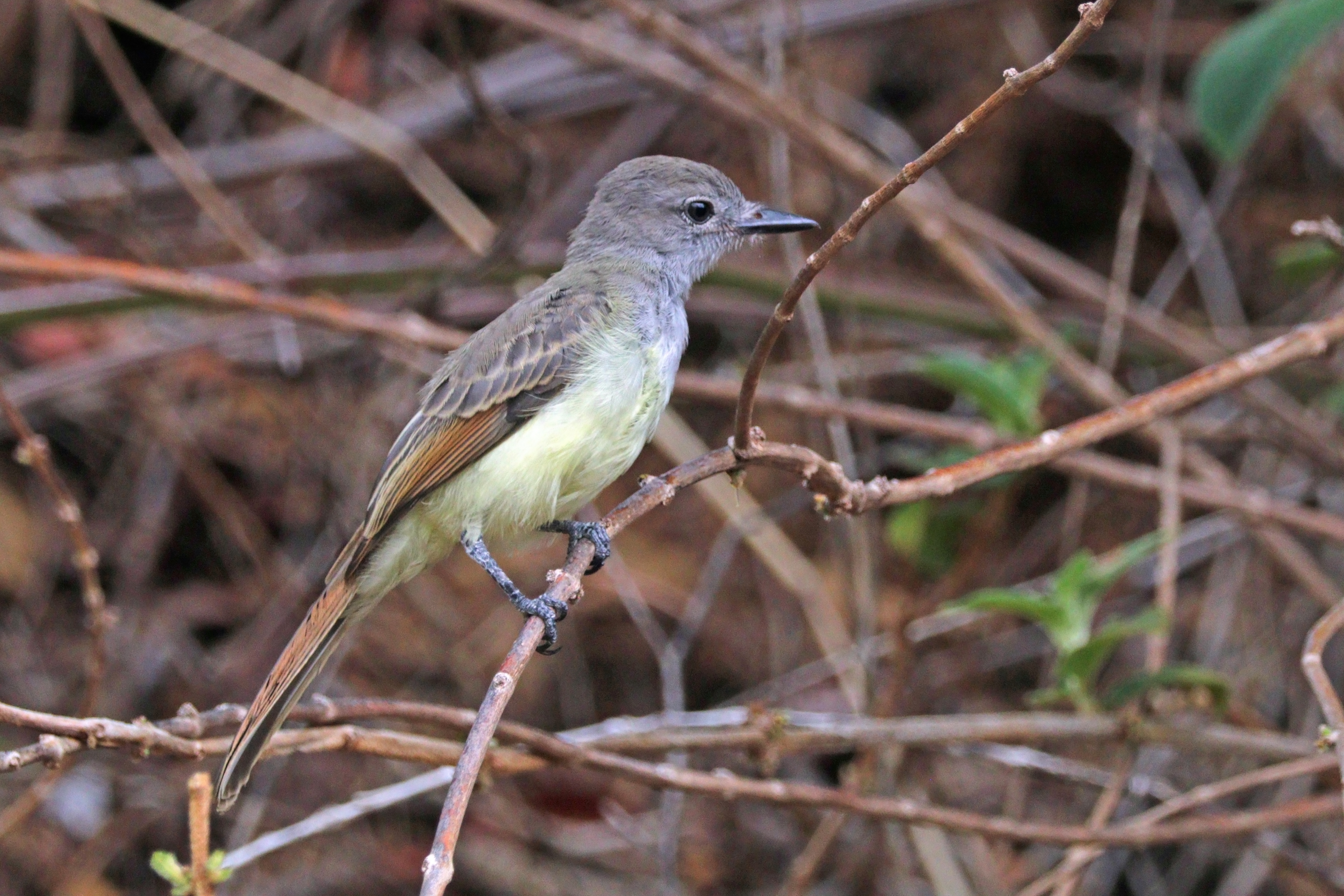
Parida Island, Panama

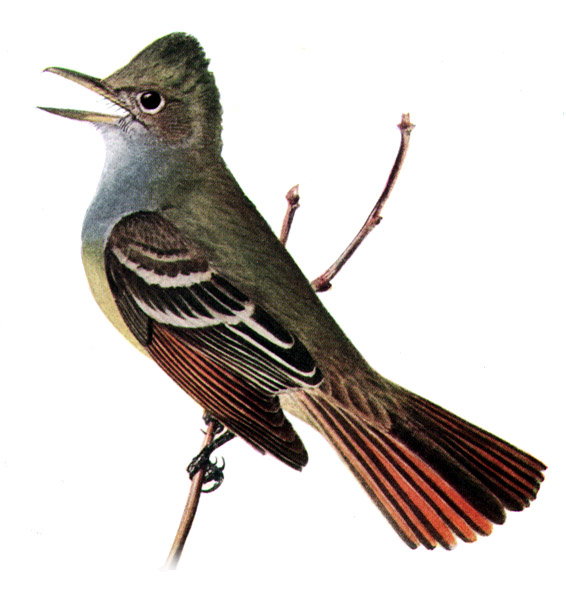
Offset reproduction of watercolor

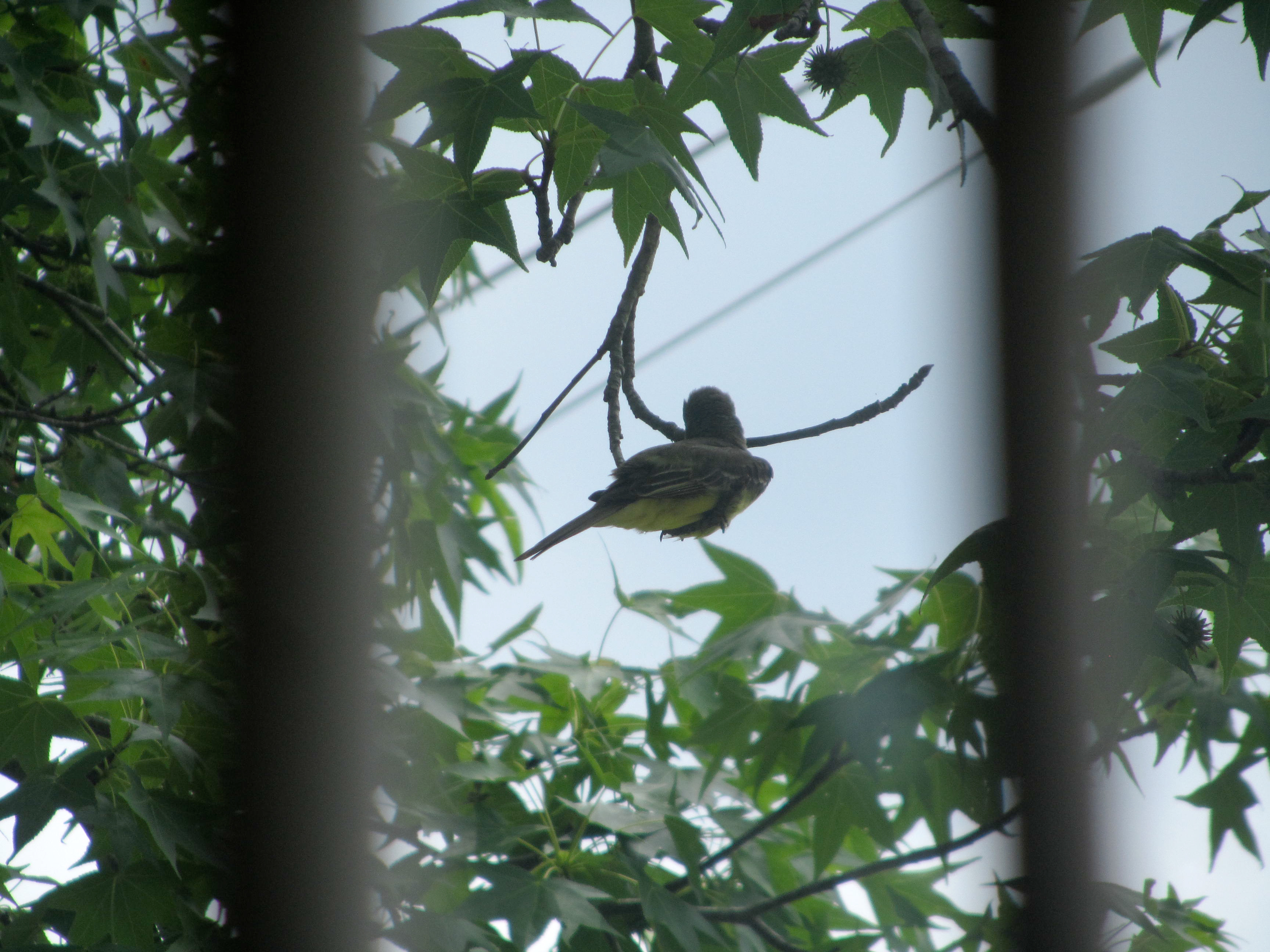
In Central Florida

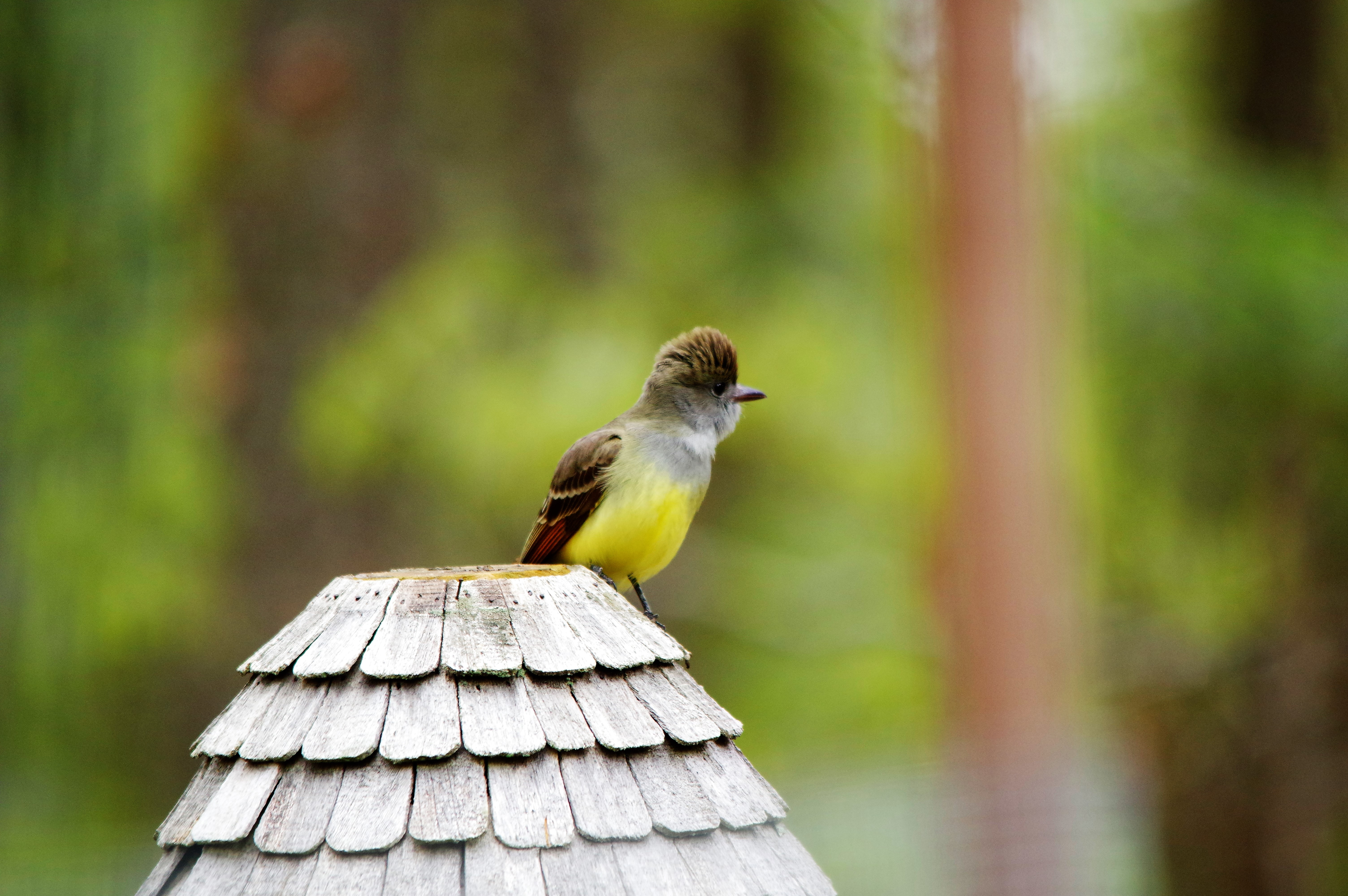
Barnegat NJ

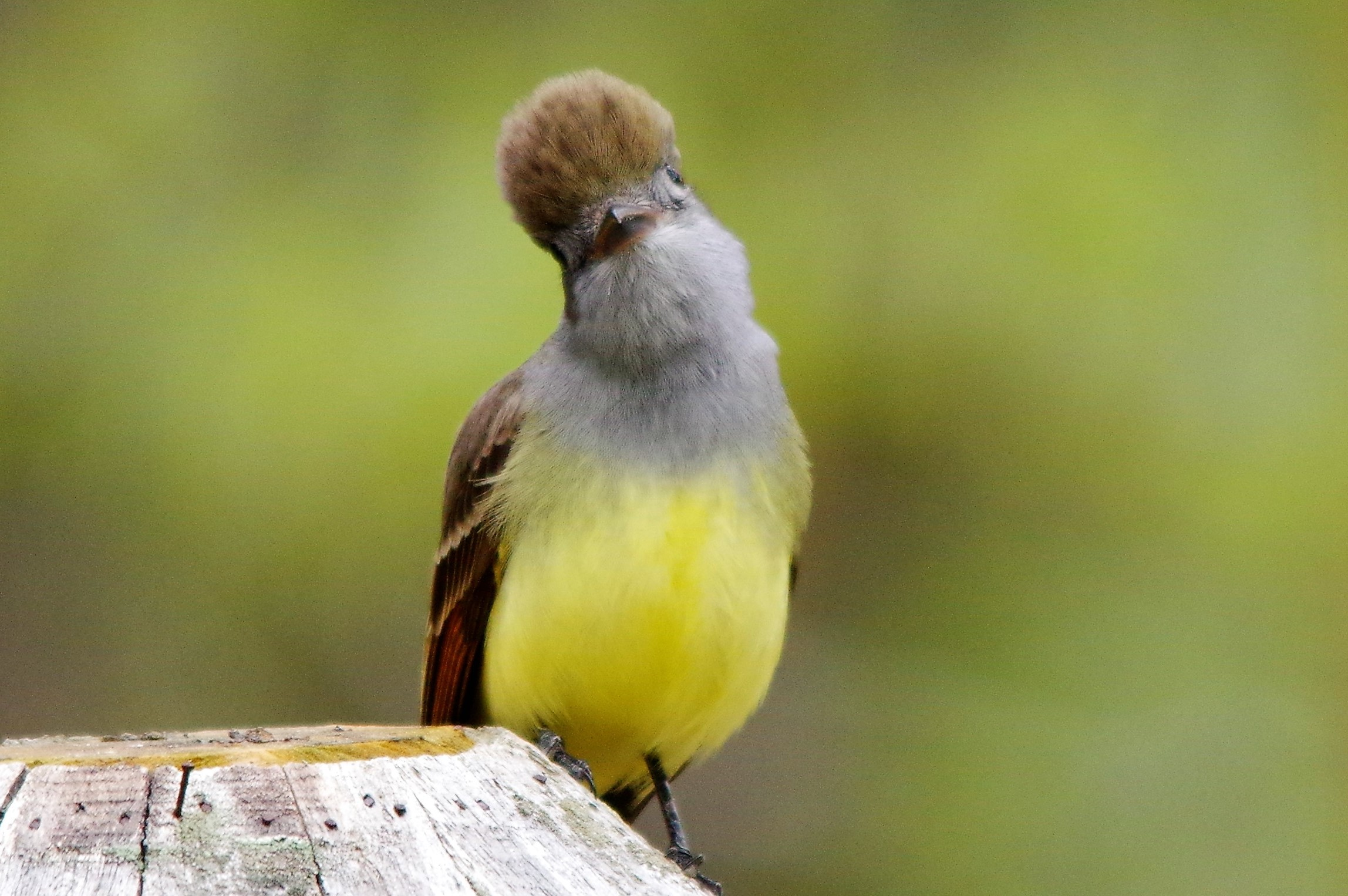
Barnegat NJ

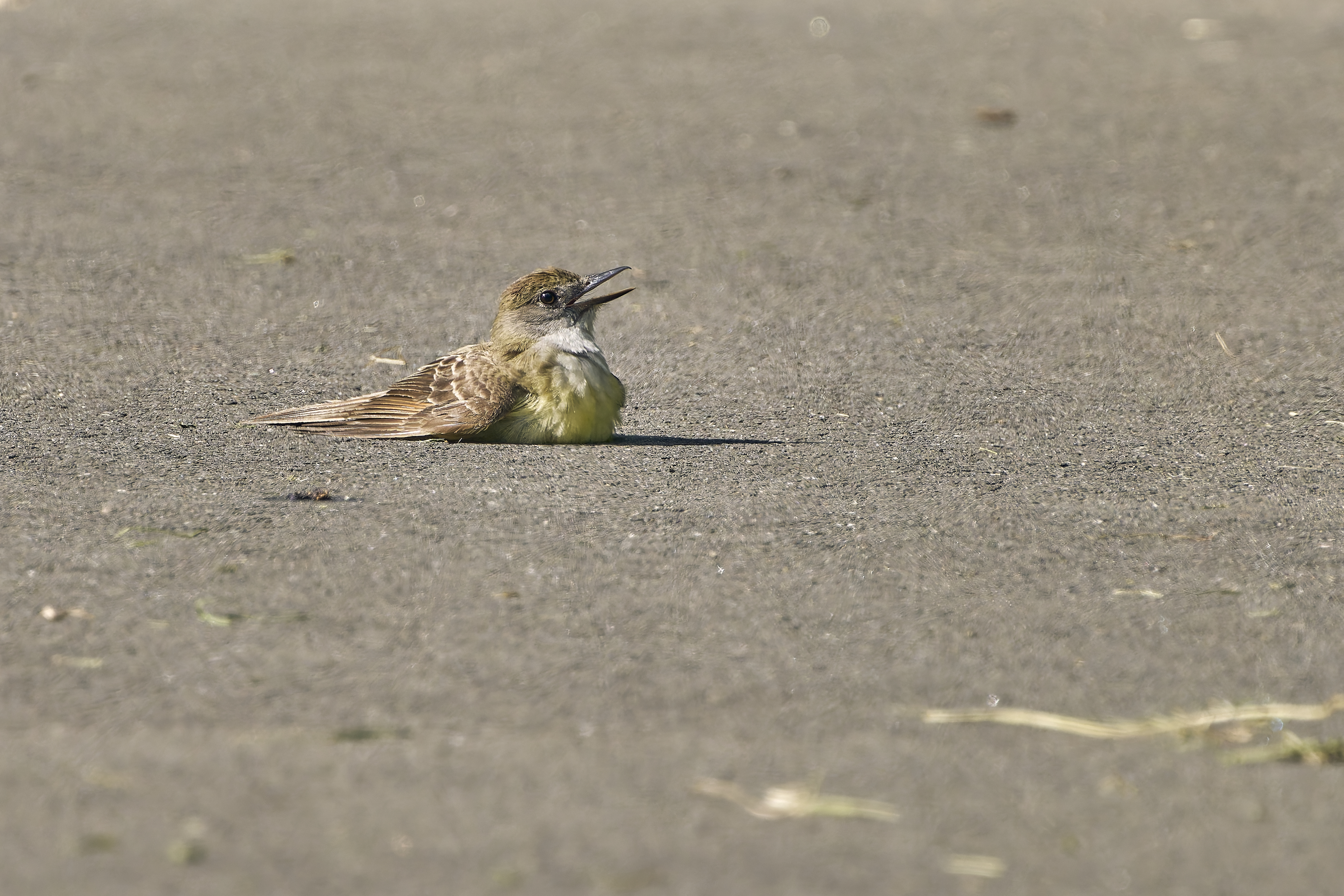
Sunbathing

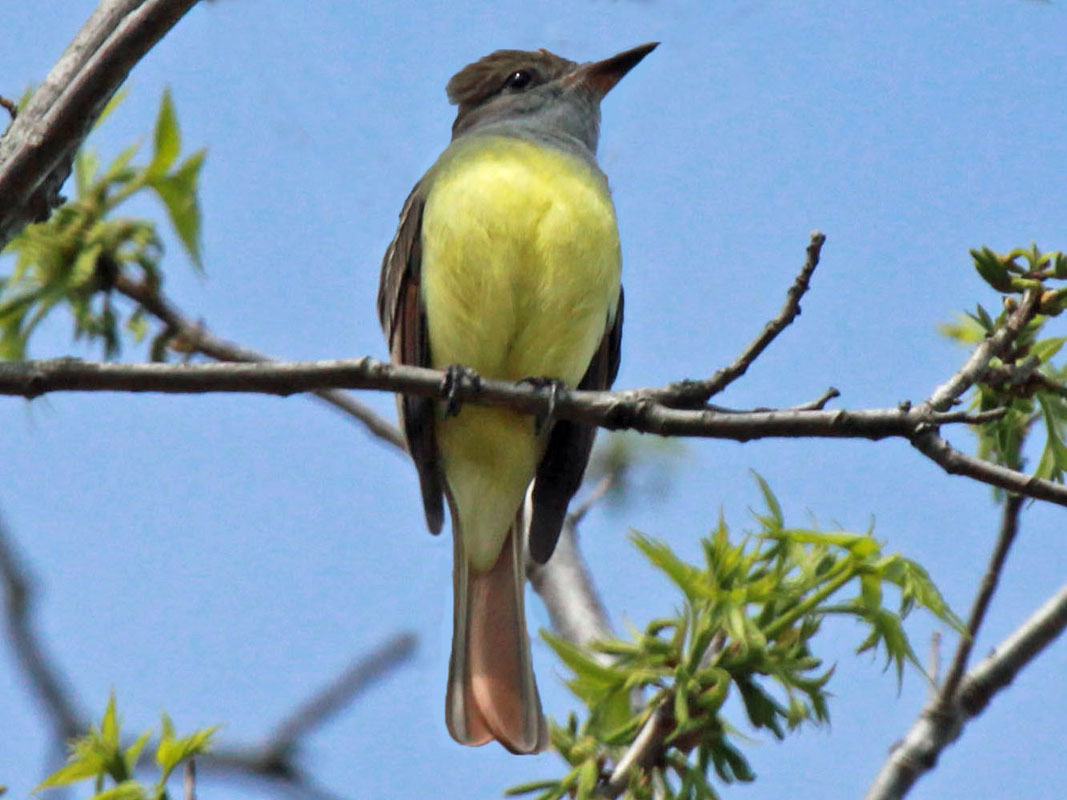
Ash, North Carolina
