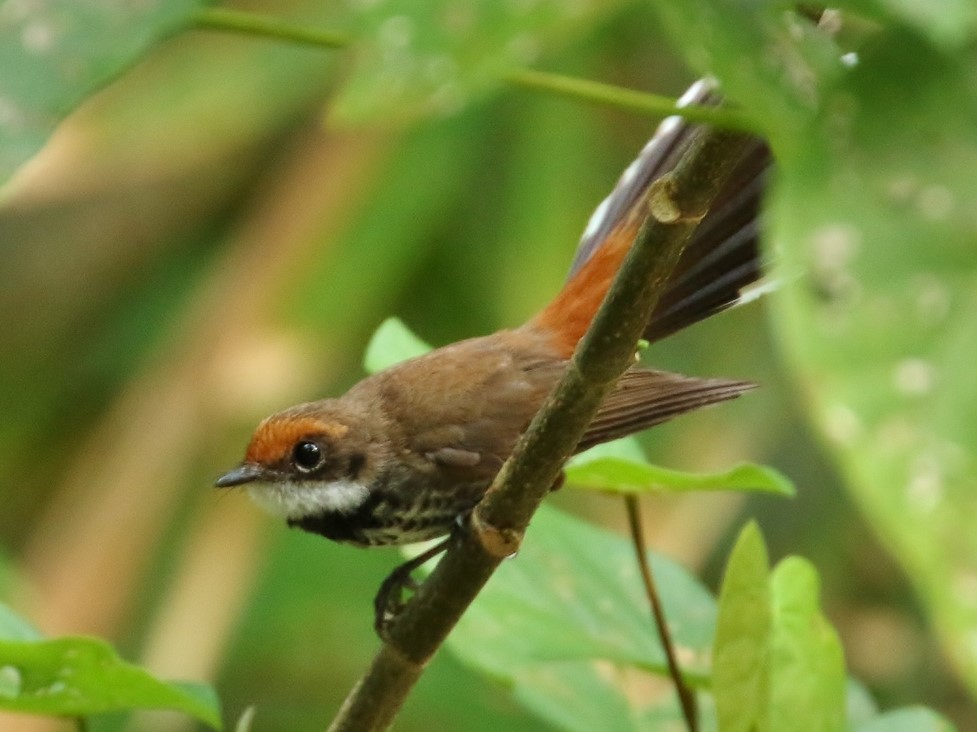
- Nominate subspecies

Scientific classification
- Kingdom: Animalia
- Phylum: Chordata
- Class: Aves
- Order: Passeriformes
- Family: Rhipiduridae
- Genus: Rhipidura
- Species: R. versicolor

Binomial name
- Rhipidura versicolor Hartlaub & Finsch, 1872

Synonyms
- Rhipidura rufifrons versicolor Hartlaub & Finsch, 1872

= Micronesian rufous fantail =

Species of bird

The Micronesian rufous fantail (Rhipidura versicolor) is a species of bird in the family Rhipiduridae that is endemic to the Mariana Islands and the island of Yap in Micronesia. It was formerly considered to be a subspecies of the Australian rufous fantail (Rhipidura rufifrons).

== Taxonomy ==
The Micronesian rufous fantail was formally described in 1872 by the German ornithologists Gustav Hartlaub and Otto Finsch based on specimens collected by the Polish naturalist John Stanislaw Kubary on the island of Yap in Micronesia. They placed it with the fantails in the genus Rhipidura and coined the binomial name Rhipidura versicolor. The specific epithet is Latin meaning "various colours" (from vertere, "to change" and color "colour"). The Micronesian rufous fantail was formerly considered to be a subspecies of the rufous fantail (renamed the Australian rufous fantail) (Rhipidura rufifrons) but is now treated as a separate species mainly based on the genetic differences.

Four subspecies are recognised:

- R. v. uraniae Oustalet, 1881 – Guam (south Mariana Islands, west Micronesia) this subspecies is Extinct
- R. v. saipanensis Hartert, EJO, 1898 – Saipan, Tinian and Aguijan (south Northern Mariana Islands, west Micronesia)
- R. v. mariae Baker, RH, 1946 – Rota (south Northern Mariana Islands, west Micronesia)
- R. v. versicolor Hartlaub & Finsch, 1872 – Yap (west Caroline Islands)
