= Blount Center =

Charles L. Blount Center
- Blount Center
- Interactive map of the Charles L. Blount Center area

General information
- Type: Educational
- Location: Gainesville, Florida, United States, 401 NW 6th St
- Coordinates: 29°39′17″N 82°19′50″W
- Opened: 1990
- Renovated: 1993, 2006, 2017

Website
- https://www.sfcollege.edu/blount/

The Charles L. Blount Center, often referred to as simply the Blount Center, is a campus of Santa Fe College (SFC), located in Gainesville, Florida. Prior to it being a campus, the center served as an educational and outreach center for those in the downtown area. Though separate from the Blount Center, the nearby Blount Hall is considered a part of the overall Blount campus.

== History ==
In 1988, the city of Gainesville deeded Santa Fe College (then known as Santa Fe Junior College) the Old Train Depot located on NW 6th Street. The center was originally a 1950s retail building with 8,000 square feet. With funds coming from the private sector, the Santa Fe College Endowment Corporation was tasked with renovating the old train station into an educational center that could be accessible to those living in the downtown area of Gainesville. The location of the Blount Center is in a historically African-American neighborhood of the downtown area.

The Blount Center opened in 1990, with Sante Fe offering college courses in their A.A. and A.S. programs. In 1993, the center was expanded after adding the renovated Gainesville Gas Co. Building. Further expansion came in 2006, with the addition of the Charles L. Blount General Classroom Building, or simply the Blount Classroom Building. Then a 50,000 square foot, three-story building, the center reached its operational capacity by 2015. Further renovation plans were made, with the expansion of Santa Fe's Center for Innovation and Economic Development (CIED) business incubator in mind, in addition to student service offices. The second and third floors were renovated to house classrooms and IT-related labs. Renovations to the building occurred in 2017. The CIED was utilized by small business owners, startup companies, and entrepreneurial efforts in the area.

=== Blount Hall ===
Charles L. Blount Hall
- Blount Hall

General information
- Type: Educational
- Location: Gainesville, Florida, United States, 530 W University Avenue
- Groundbreaking: 2019
- Construction started: 2020
- Opened: 2022

Website
- https://www.sfcollege.edu/blount/

In 2018, plans for another expansion project began that involved the CIED being replaced by the planned Blount Hall. The then-CIED, but now Blount Hall location also has RTS bus route access. The new Blount Hall continued to provide business incubation space for the CIED.

Costing $36.4 million, the Blount Hall expansion was part of a project to establish the center as an SFC campus that would provide financial aid services, library services, and academic advisors for students. Groundbreaking for the project began in October 2019 and construction began in February 2020. Parrish-McCall Constructors was the company that worked on construction for Blount Hall, which was designed with environmental friendliness in mind, "on track to achieve the LEED (Leadership in Energy and Environmental Design) Silver certification from the U.S. Green Building Council for sustainability and resource efficiency".

Located at 530 W. University Avenue, the new Blount Hall serves those in east Gainesville and the city's downtown area. The main campus is located on the other side of the city, on NW 83rd Street; the expansion project was designed to provide student services for those closer to the downtown and east areas of Gainesville who may find difficulty getting to the main campus.

The new building was dubbed Blount Hall and opened on April 8, 2022.
