= Gainesville Regional Transit System =

Public transit provider in Florida, US

Gainesville RTS

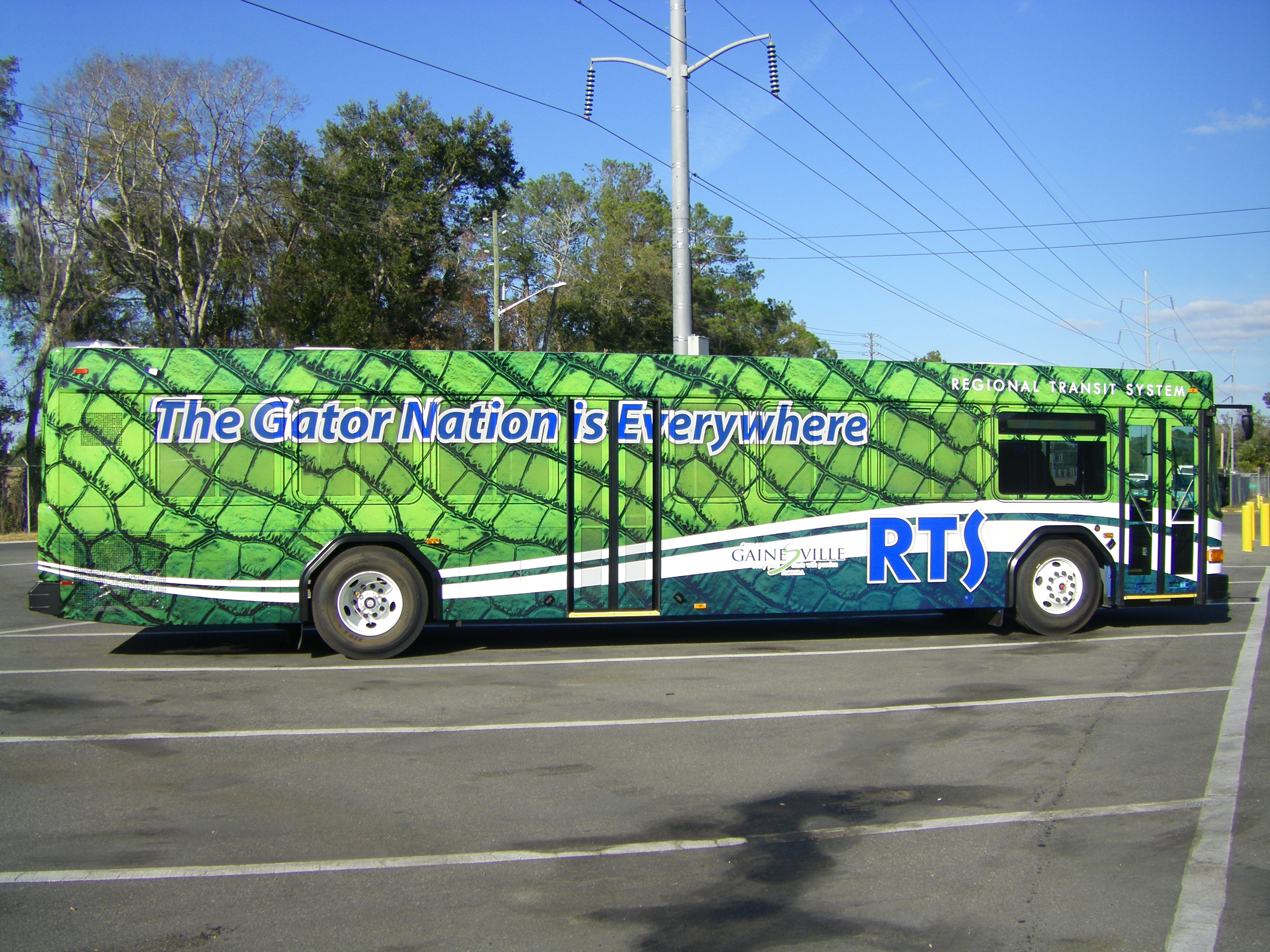
- 2011 Gillig with Gator scale wrap
- Parent: City of Gainesville
- Founded: 1974
- Headquarters: 34 SE 13th Rd; Gainesville, FL 32601
- Locale: Gainesville, Florida
- Service area: Alachua County, Florida
- Service type: Bus service
- Fleet: 135
- Daily ridership: 25,239 (2019)
- Fuel type: B20 (biodiesel)
- Chief executive: Jesus Gomez
- Website: Gainesville RTS website

Gainesville Regional Transit System is the local area transit corporation that serves the Gainesville, Alachua County, Florida area, the University of Florida and Santa Fe College campuses. It presently serves 40 city routes (19 on Saturdays, 16 on Sundays) and 10 campus routes. Paratransit (ADA) service is also provided to anyone with a Gainesville address.

== City routes ==
No.	Description	Operates
1	Rosa Parks RTS Downtown Station to Butler Plaza RTS Transfer Station	Mon-Sun
2	Rosa Parks RTS Downtown Station to NE Walmart Supercenter	Mon-Sat
3	Rosa Parks RTS Downtown Station to N Main St. Post Office	Mon-Fri
5	Rosa Parks RTS Downtown Station to Oaks Mall	Mon-Sun
6	Rosa Parks RTS Downtown Station to North Walmart Supercenter	Mon-Sat
7	Rosa Parks RTS Downtown Station to Eastwood Meadows	Mon-Fri
8	UF Health Shands Hospital to North Walmart Supercenter	Mon-Sun
9	Reitz Union to Hunters Run	Mon-Sun
10	Rosa Parks RTS Downtown Station to Santa Fe College	Mon-Sat
11	Rosa Parks RTS Downtown Station to Eastwood Meadows	Mon-Sun
12	Reitz Union to Butler Plaza RTS Transfer Station	Mon-Sun
13	Beaty Towers at the University of Florida to Cottage Grove Apartments	Mon-Sun
15	Rosa Parks RTS Downtown Station to NW 13th St./NW 23rd Ave.	Mon-Sun
16	Beaty Towers at the University of Florida to Sugar Hill	Mon-Sun
17	Beaty Towers at the University of Florida to Rosa Parks RTS Downtown Station	Mon-Fri
20	Reitz Union to Oaks Mall	Mon-Sun
21	Reitz Union to Cabana Beach Apts	Mon-Fri
23	Oaks Mall to Santa Fe College	Mon-Fri
25	UF Commuter Lot to Gainesville Regional Airport	Mon-Sun
26	Rosa Parks RTS Downtown Station to Gainesville Regional Airport	Mon-Fri
27	Rosa Parks RTS Downtown Station to NE Walmart Supercenter	Mon-Fri
28	The Hub to Butler Plaza RTS Transfer Station	Mon-Fri
33	Butler Plaza RTS Transfer Station to Midtown	Mon-Sun
34	The Hub to Lexington Crossing Apts	Mon-Fri
35	Reitz Union to SW 35th Place	Mon-Sun
36	The Hub to SW 34th St. Post Office (Williston Plaza)	Mon-Fri
37	Reitz Union to Butler Plaza RTS Transfer Station (via SW 35th Place)	Mon-Sun
38	The Hub to Enclave Apts	Mon-Fri
40	The Hub to Hunters Crossing	Mon-Fri
43	UF Health Shands Hospital to Santa Fe College	Mon-Fri
46	Reitz Union to Rosa Parks RTS Downtown Station	Mon-Fri
75	Oaks Mall to Butler Plaza RTS Transfer Station	Mon-Sun
76	Haile Plantation to Santa Fe College	Mon-Fri
78	Butler Plaza RTS Transfer Station to Santa Fe College	Mon-Fri
150	Haile Plantation to UF Health Shands Hospital	Mon-Fri
711	Rosa Parks RTS Downtown Station to Eastwood Meadows	Mon-Fri after 8:00 p.m., all day Sat-Sun

== Campus Service ==
10 RTS routes operate on the University of Florida (UF) campus. These include "park and ride" and circulator routes. UF and Santa Fe College (SF) students have prepaid unlimited access to RTS services through a transportation fee attached to each credit hour for undergraduates. UF faculty, staff, spouses and retirees have unlimited prepaid access through the RTS Employee Bus Pass Program, as do SF faculty, staff and students.

No.	Description	Operates
117	Reitz Union to Park-N Ride 2 (SW 34th Street)	Mon-Fri
118	The Hub to Park-N Ride 1 (UF Cultural Plaza)	Mon-Fri
119	The Hub to Family Housing at the University of Florida	Mon-Fri
120	The Hub to University of Florida West Circulator (Fraternity Row)	Mon-Fri
121	The Hub to UF Commuter Lot	Mon-Fri
122	University of Florida North/South Circulator	Mon-Fri
125	The Hub to Lakeside	Mon-Fri
126	Sorority Row to Lakeside	Mon-Fri
127	University of Florida East Circulator (Sorority Row)	Mon-Fri
128	Reitz Union to Lake Wauberg	Saturdays during spring and the first half of summer

=== Later Gator ===
Later Gator is a late night service that provides safe, late night service for students between campus, downtown, the Oaks Mall and southwest Gainesville through five routes. This service has been cancelled with no clear future plans to return service to the routes.

Route Letter	Description	Operates
A	Sorority Row to and from Downtown Station	8:30 pm – 3:20 am Wednesday-Saturday
B	SW Gainesville to and from Downtown Station	8:50 pm – 3:13 am Thursday-Saturday
C	Oaks Mall to and from Downtown Station	8:30 pm – 3:14 am Thursday-Saturday
D	Cottage Grove Apts. to and from Downtown Station	8:00 pm – 2:30 am Saturday Only
F	Butler Plaza to and from Downtown Station	8:30 pm – 3:18 am Saturday Only

=== Gator Aider ===
Gator Aider is a shuttle service provided to transport fans to and from University of Florida Gators home football games. Service is available at five park-n-ride locations around the Greater Gainesville area including the Town of Tioga, the Oaks Mall, Haile Plantation, the UF Hilton Conference Center and the City of Gainesville Downtown Parking Garage.

== Bus Tracking ==
In 2008, RTS equipped their fleet with a GPS capability called TransLoc. This enables riders to see if their bus is running on time. TransLoc Rider, a mobile phone app that incorporates the TransLoc GPS capability, is also available for riders.

== Fleet ==
Gainesville Stop Requested Announcement
An automatic announcement which comes after ringing the bell. Tells riders on how to be safe after departing the bus

Since 1974, Gainesville has had a diverse fleet of buses bought from Transit Authorities in state and manufacturers such as GMC, Orion Bus Industries, Blue Bird, Nova Bus, Flexible, Gillig Corporation. All RTS buses are equipped with bicycle racks and wheelchair lifts. While many were purchased new, others were acquired second-hand from other operators in the state, including 30 that were acquired from Lynx and 11 from Palm Tran. RTS acquired five new Gillig hybrid electric buses (two in early 2012 and three more in 2013).

=== Active Fleet ===
- Gillig Phantom
- Gillig Low Floor

=== Retired Fleet ===
- Nova Bus RTS
