= O'Connell Center =

Multipurpose sports facility of the University of Florida

Tower Hill Arena at the Stephen C. O'Connell Center
- "The O'Dome"
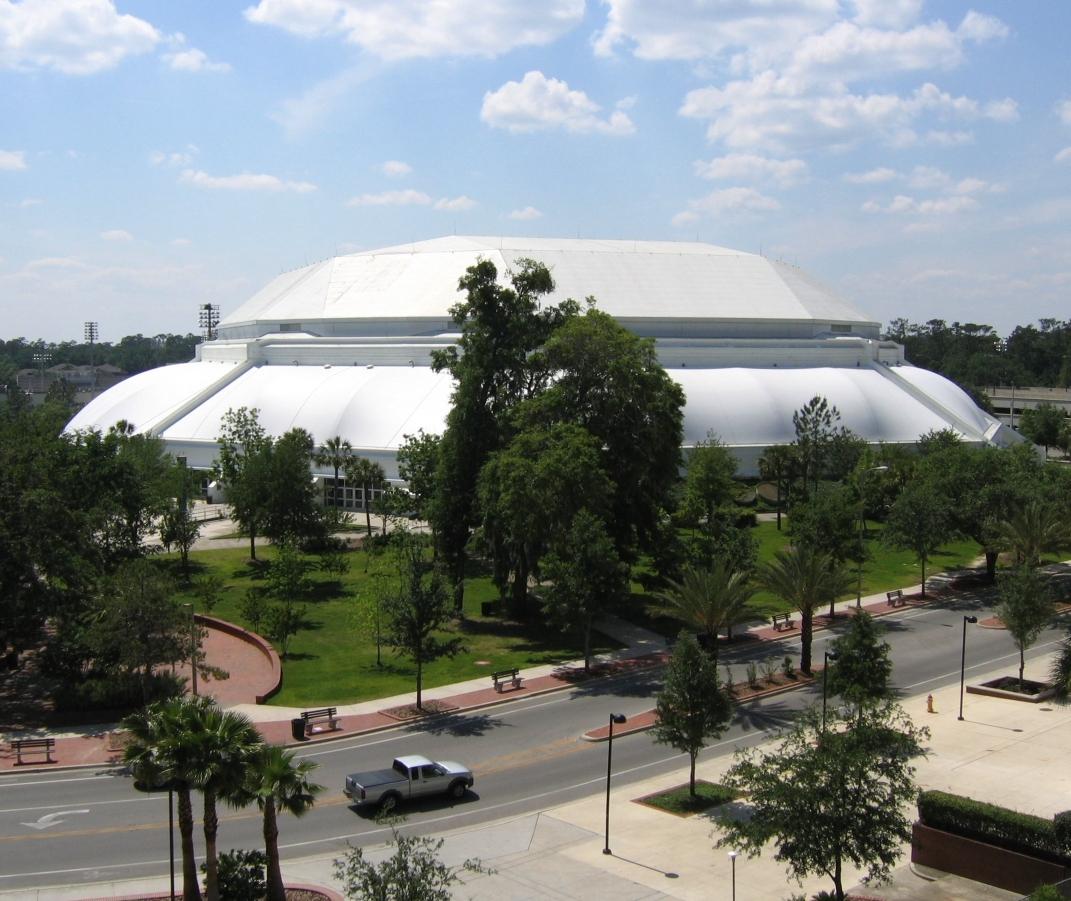
- Interactive map of Tower Hill Arena at the Stephen C. O'Connell Center
- Location: 250 Gale Lemerand Drive; Gainesville, Florida 32611
- Coordinates: 29°38′58″N 82°21′04″W
- Owner: University of Florida
- Operator: University of Florida
- Capacity: 10,571 (2016–present); 12,050 (1980–2016)
- Surface: Multi-surface
- Record attendance: 12,633 (all-time); 11,355 (post-renovation)
- Public transit: 8

Construction
- Groundbreaking: October 1977
- Opened: December 30, 1980
- Renovated: 1998, 2016
- Cost: $15.6 million ($61 million in 2025 dollars)
- Architects: Caudill Rowlett Scott; Moore, May & Harrington
- Structural engineer: Geiger–Berger Associates
- General contractors: Dyson and Company, Inc. Brasfield & Gorrie (2016)

Tenants
- Florida Gators men's basketball Florida Gators women's basketball Florida Gators women's volleyball Florida Gators women's gymnastics Florida Gators swimming and diving

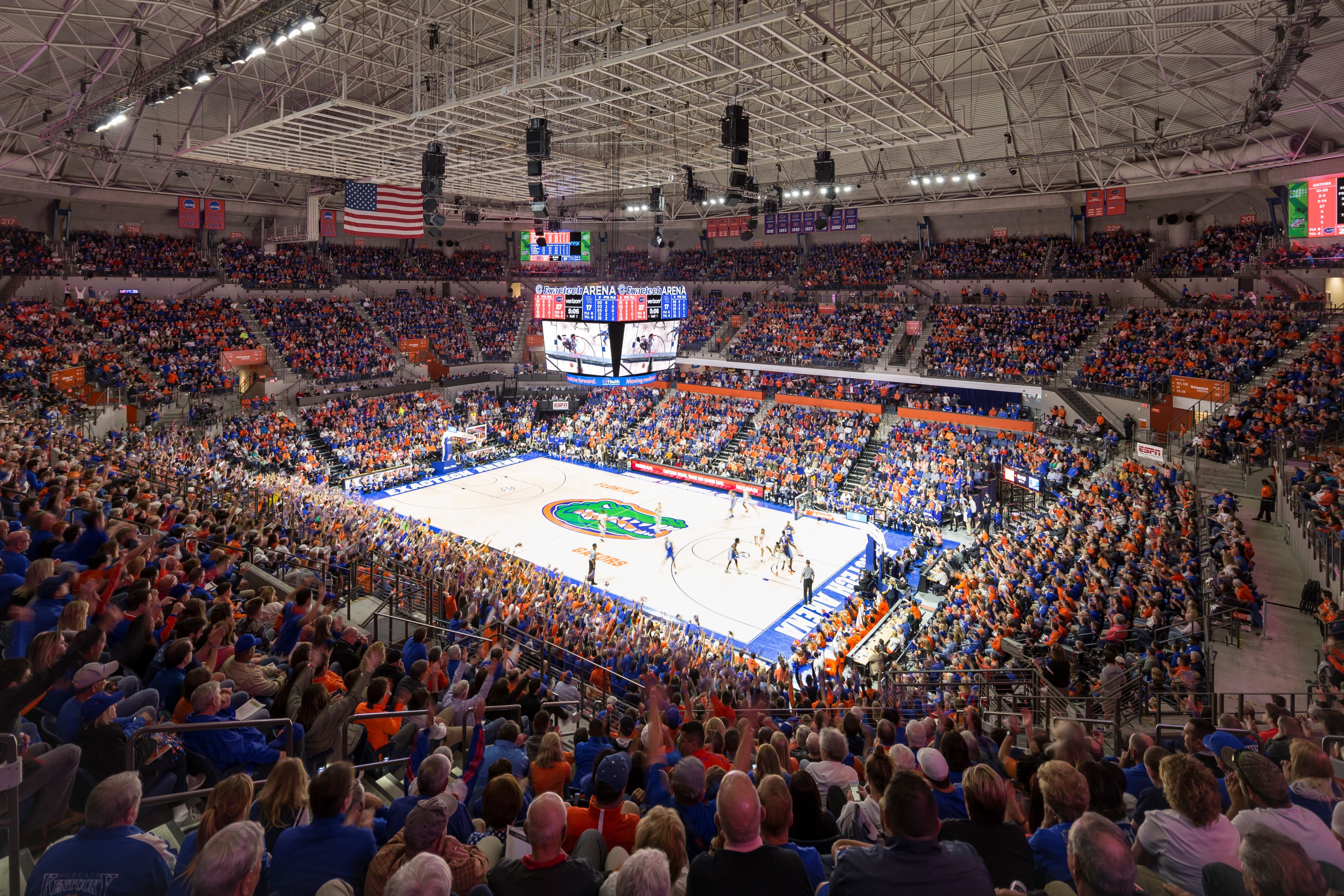
The interior of Exactech Arena at the O'Connell Center

Tower Hill Arena at the Stephen C. O'Connell Center, also known as the O'Dome, is a 10,500-seat multi-purpose arena located on the University of Florida campus in Gainesville, Florida. The facility is named for the sixth president of the university, Stephen C. O'Connell, who served from 1967 to 1973. The facility is located on the northern side of the university's campus, between its football field, Ben Hill Griffin Stadium at Florida Field, and the James W. "Bill" Heavener Complex athletic training center.

The entire facility was known as the O'Connell Center from 1980 until 2016. The building underwent a major $64.5 million renovation / reconstruction during that year, and Exactech, a Gainesville medical firm, signed a $5.9 million, 10-year naming rights deal for the main arena, which was officially renamed the Exactech Arena at the Stephen C. O'Connell Center.

In 2026, Tower Hill Insurance purchased the naming rights to the arena, marking a major expansion of the partnership between the company and university.

== Florida Gators home arena ==
Tower Hill Arena, which is owned by the University of Florida, is the home arena of several of the university's Florida Gators intercollegiate sports teams, including the men's and women's college basketball, women's volleyball, women's gymnastics, and men's and women's swimming and diving teams.

The facility was quickly dubbed the "O'Dome" by students, a nickname that is still in use. ESPN The Magazine nicknamed it the "House of Horrors" in 1999, a name that the sports teams began using promotionally a few years later. The student section of the stadium has been dubbed the "Rowdy Reptiles". ESPN commentator Dick Vitale, on assignment at the Florida-Kentucky game in 2006, said that the Rowdy Reptiles make the O'Dome one of the toughest places to play in college basketball.

On December 23, 2006, a then-record crowd of 12,621 watched the fifth-ranked Gators men's basketball team defeat the third-ranked Ohio State Buckeyes, 86–60. The two teams would meet again that season for the National Championship game, with the Gators, once again, emerging victorious–this time, with an 84–75 victory to become the first back-to-back national champions since Duke in 1991 and 1992. This attendance record was broken, however, on February 5, 2011, in a 70–68 Gator victory over the 11th-ranked Kentucky Wildcats, as 12,633 attended the game. Following the 2016 renovation, on April 7, 2025, the Gators hosted a viewing party of the National Championship game which saw a crowd of 11,355 gather to witness the Gators defeating the Houston Cougars, 65–63, to win their third men's basketball title. This currently stands as the largest attendance in the arena post-renovation. The record for paid attendance post-renovation is 11,255, which was achieved on February 19, 2022 when the Gators defeated the 2nd-ranked Auburn Tigers.

== Other uses ==
In addition to sports, the O'Connell Center regularly hosts many other events on campus. It is the largest concert venue in North Central Florida and has been the venue for a wide variety of performances, including a 2006 show by Gainesville native Tom Petty that aired on PBS's Soundstage TV series. Tom Petty's first ever show at the O'Connell Center was the year after it opened on October 7, 1981. Other events held at the facility include University of Florida graduation ceremonies, trade shows, career fairs, political rallies, public speeches, and various large banquets and private events.

== Event Capacities ==
Concerts:

Full House: 7,000

In the Round: 10,500

Speaking Engagements:

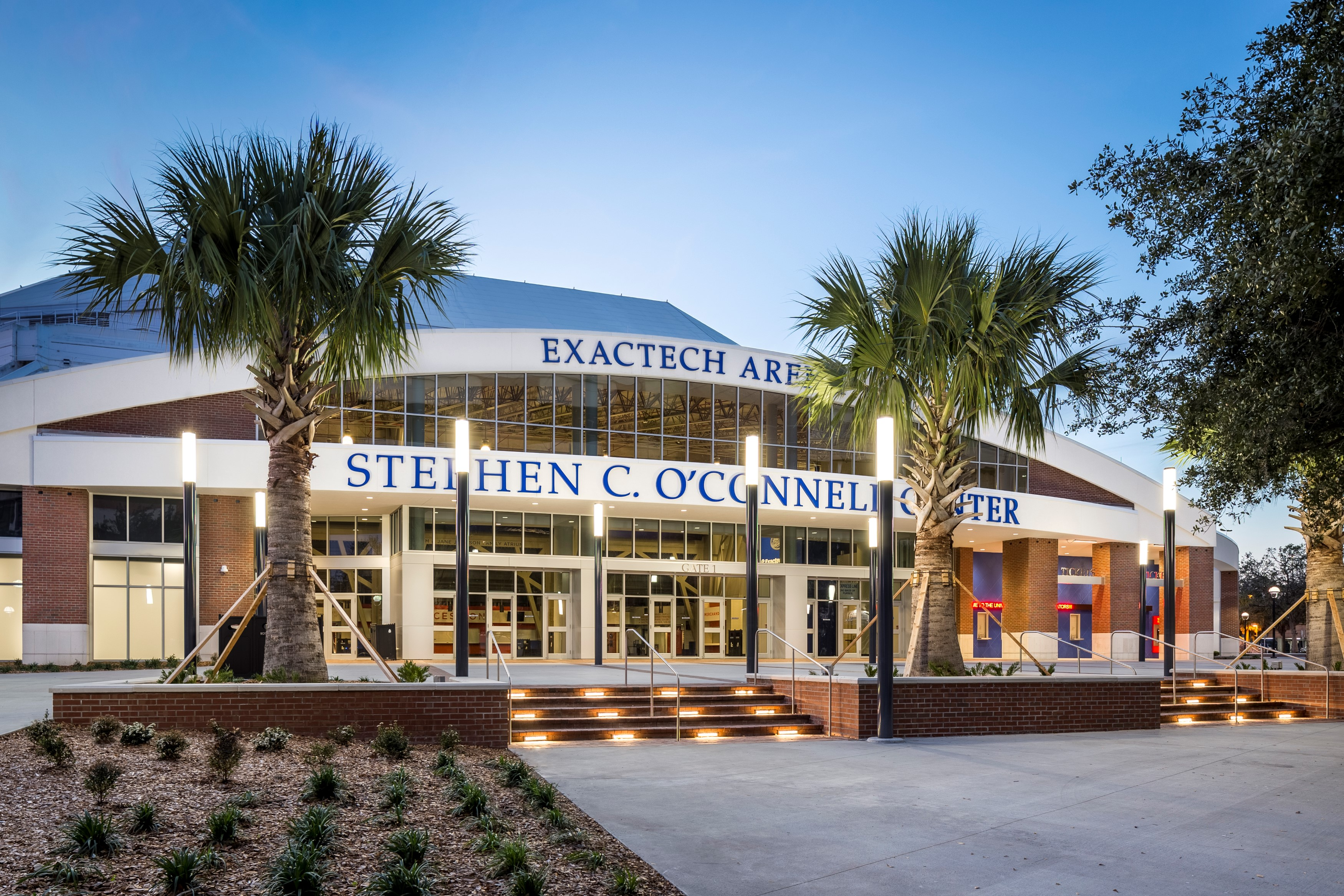
The front of the O'Connell Center, photographed post-renovation in 2017

Half House (standard set): 2,500-3,500

Full House: 6,000-7,000

Athletics:

Men's Basketball: 10,571

Women's Basketball: 10,571

Volleyball: 10,571

Gymnastics: 9,251

Banquets:

Up to 1,200

Trade Shows:

Service Level: 110 (8 ft X 10 ft booths)

Concourse Level (non-Arena): 140 (8 ft X 10 ft booths)

Total Exhibition Booths: 250

== History ==
=== Alligator Alley ===
Before the O'Connell Center, the University of Florida's basketball teams and other indoor sports programs used the on-campus Florida Gymnasium, which was nicknamed Alligator Alley. The Florida Gym was built in 1949, and it was considered a difficult venue for opponents because the seating was very close to the court and, when full, the noise level was "deafening". However, it was also small, had very few amenities and had no air conditioning. It was compared to a "dismal and dreary" high school gym by observers. By the early 1970s, Florida was the only school in the Southeastern Conference without a modern basketball facility, a factor that affected the recruiting of top players and held back the growth of its long-mediocre basketball program.

=== UF / USF collaboration ===
In 1975, the University of Florida Athletic Association decided to seek funds to build a new facility for UF's indoor sports programs. The University of South Florida (USF) in Tampa had also decided to build a large indoor arena at about the same time, so the schools agreed to commission a common architectural design to stretch limited state funding. As originally constructed, USF's Sun Dome (now known as the Yuengling Center) and UF's O'Connell Center featured almost identical inflatable roof systems and main arenas. The primary difference was that the O'Connell Center included training areas and facilities for other sports around the main arena while USF added these facilities to the Sun Dome in a later expansion.

The $15.6 million O'Connell Center broke ground in October 1977 in a parking lot across the street from Florida Field. Construction was delayed on both the Sun Dome and the O'Connell Center when cracks appeared in precast concrete support beams. The problems were fixed after several months, and the sister facilities were completed within a few weeks of each other in late 1980 – the Sun Dome in November and the O'Connell Center in December.

The first event at the Stephen C. O'Connell Student Activities Center (as it was originally known) was a Florida men's basketball game held on December 30, 1980. It was officially dedicated a few weeks later in January 1981.

=== Effect on basketball program ===
The new arena had an immediate positive effect on Florida's men's basketball program, and its first recruit was former coach Norm Sloan. Sloan had been Florida's coach in the 1960s but had left for North Carolina State, winning a national championship with the Wolfpack in 1974. He returned to Florida in 1980 and was thus the Gators' coach during the first season played in the new O'Connell Center. Sloan explained that he had "enjoyed it tremendously when I was here before, and I always felt that if Florida had the proper facility, I would consider coming back." Playing in their new arena under Sloan, the Gators consistently improved and eventually made their first NCAA tournament in 1987, setting the stage for greater success under subsequent coaches in the years to come.

== Design and renovations ==
The O'Connell Center was envisioned as a competition and practice facility for most of the university's indoor sports programs, and this has been the case throughout its existence. The large (292,000 square feet (27,100 m^{2})) Tower Hill Arena is the core of the building, and is surrounded by a basketball practice court, a natatorium, as well as gymnastics practice facilities.

=== Original roof ===
When it first opened, the O'Connell Center had an inflatable Teflon roof and a system of blowers and air handlers that kept the inside air pressure high enough to hold the flexible roof in place. This higher air pressure was not noticeable inside of the facility, but opening a door to the outside would result in a rush of air escaping the building, so revolving doors were installed at each of the four main gates to lessen the loss of pressure as thousands of fans entered or exited. Maintenance costs for the inflation system rose over the years, and as part of a $10 million renovation in 1998, the roof was replaced with a more conventional hard shell dome. Though no longer in use, the old blowers and duct work for the inflation system remained in place until the facility was extensively renovated again in 2016.

=== Minor renovations ===
After the 1998 redesign of the roof, the facility underwent a smaller renovation in 2006, when the university updated some of the fold-able seating and replaced the four scoreboards located above Gates 1 through 4 in each corner of the arena. The old dot matrix boards were removed and replaced by modern video boards that could display instant replays and video presentations. Following the men's basketball team's victory in the national title game of the 2006 NCAA Division I men's basketball tournament, the University Athletic Association (UAA) bought the temporary hardwood floor that had been installed in the now-demolished Indianapolis RCA Dome for the Final Four. Although the national finals logos were removed by sanding, from 2011 to 2016 the basketball teams played on the same lumber on which the Gators won their first basketball national championship. The UAA also bought the court used to win their second title from the Georgia Dome in 2007, and displayed it in the O'Connell Center during their championship celebration event, and later sold it in pieces to raise funds for scholarships.

=== 2016 rebuild ===
In March 2016, the O'Connell Center began its most extensive renovation to date with a $64.5 million project that reconstructed the main arena with significant changes to its layout and design. Led by contractors from Brasfield & Gorrie, the entire interior of the arena was demolished to the foundation and rebuilt. In addition to a new seating bowl with a luxury club with box seats, a new hanging scoreboard with a large video screen was installed over the floor. Locker rooms and meeting rooms were also upgraded, swimming and gymnastics areas were revamped, and a "grand entrance" was built facing Ben Hill Griffin Stadium across the street, among many other improvements. When it reopened in December 2016, a naming rights deal with local medical firm Exactech changed the name of the main arena to the Exactech Arena at the Stephen C. O'Connell Center.

== Photo gallery ==
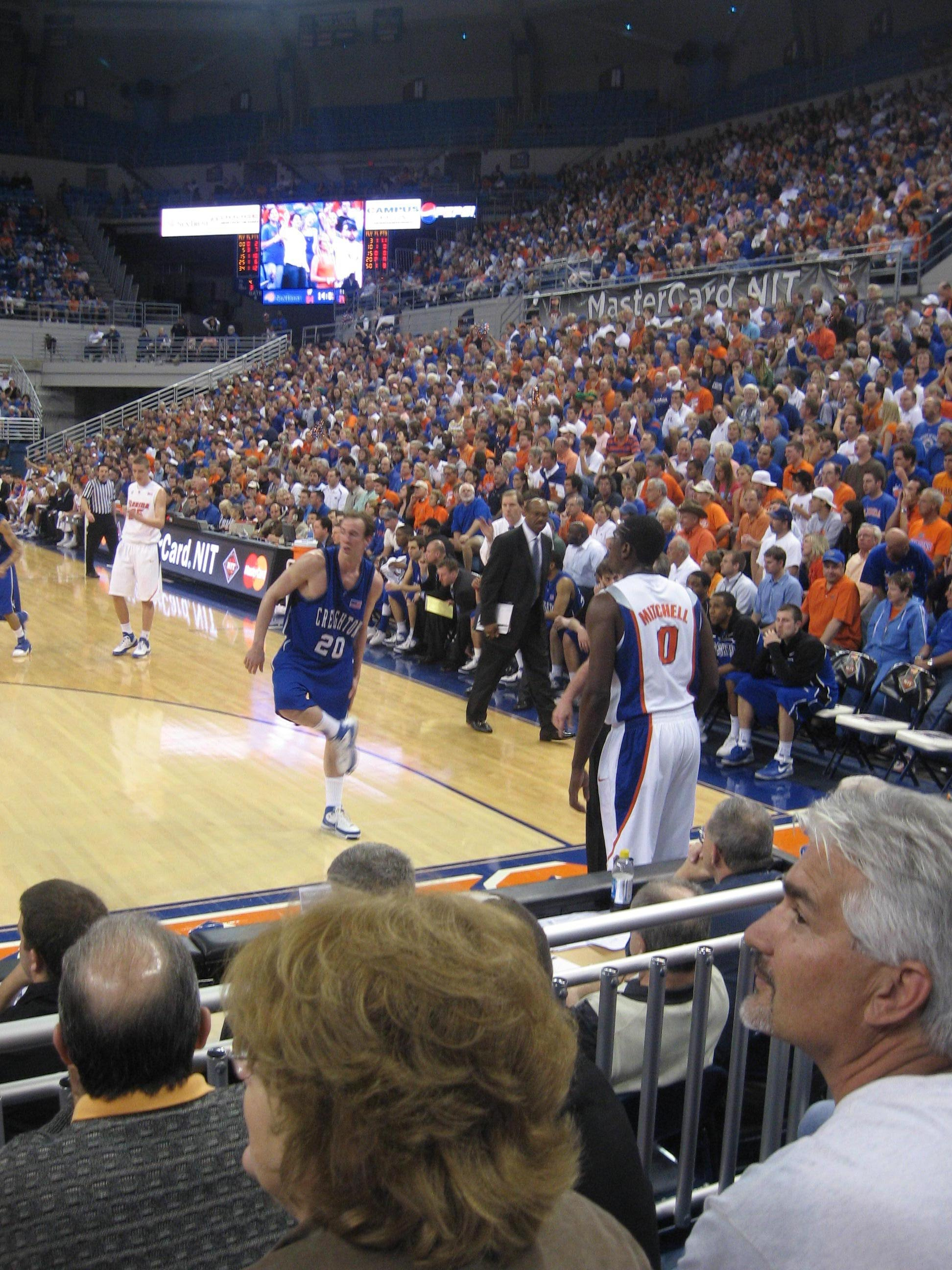
The non-student side of the O'Connell Center during the 2008 NIT Second Round. Note the video replay board in the upper left added during the 2006–2007 season.

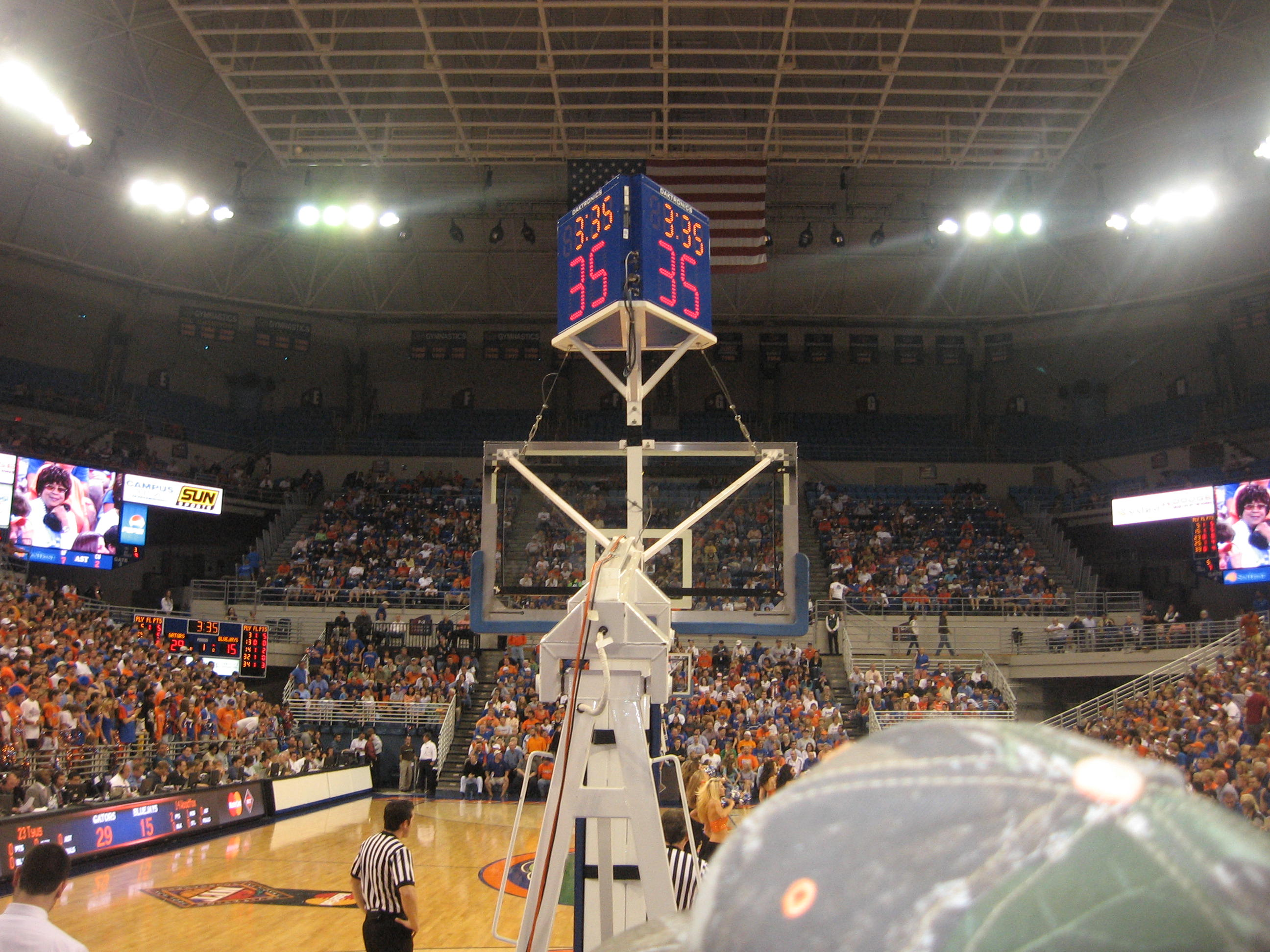
Another angle from inside of the O'Connell Center during the 2008 NIT Second Round

Florida men's basketball championship banners hanging inside the O'Connell Center during the 2012–13 season

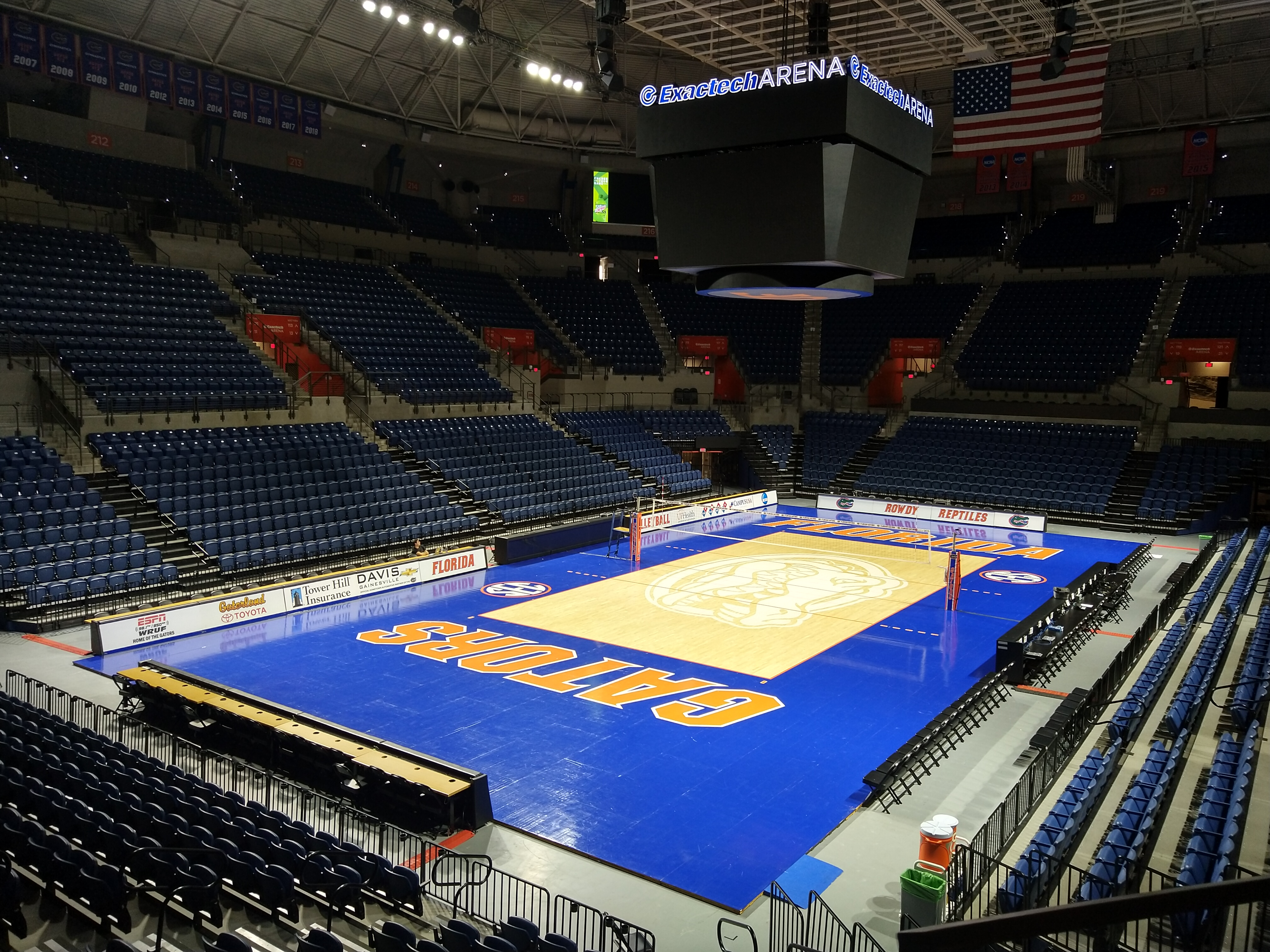
Exactech Area set up for a volleyball match in 2019

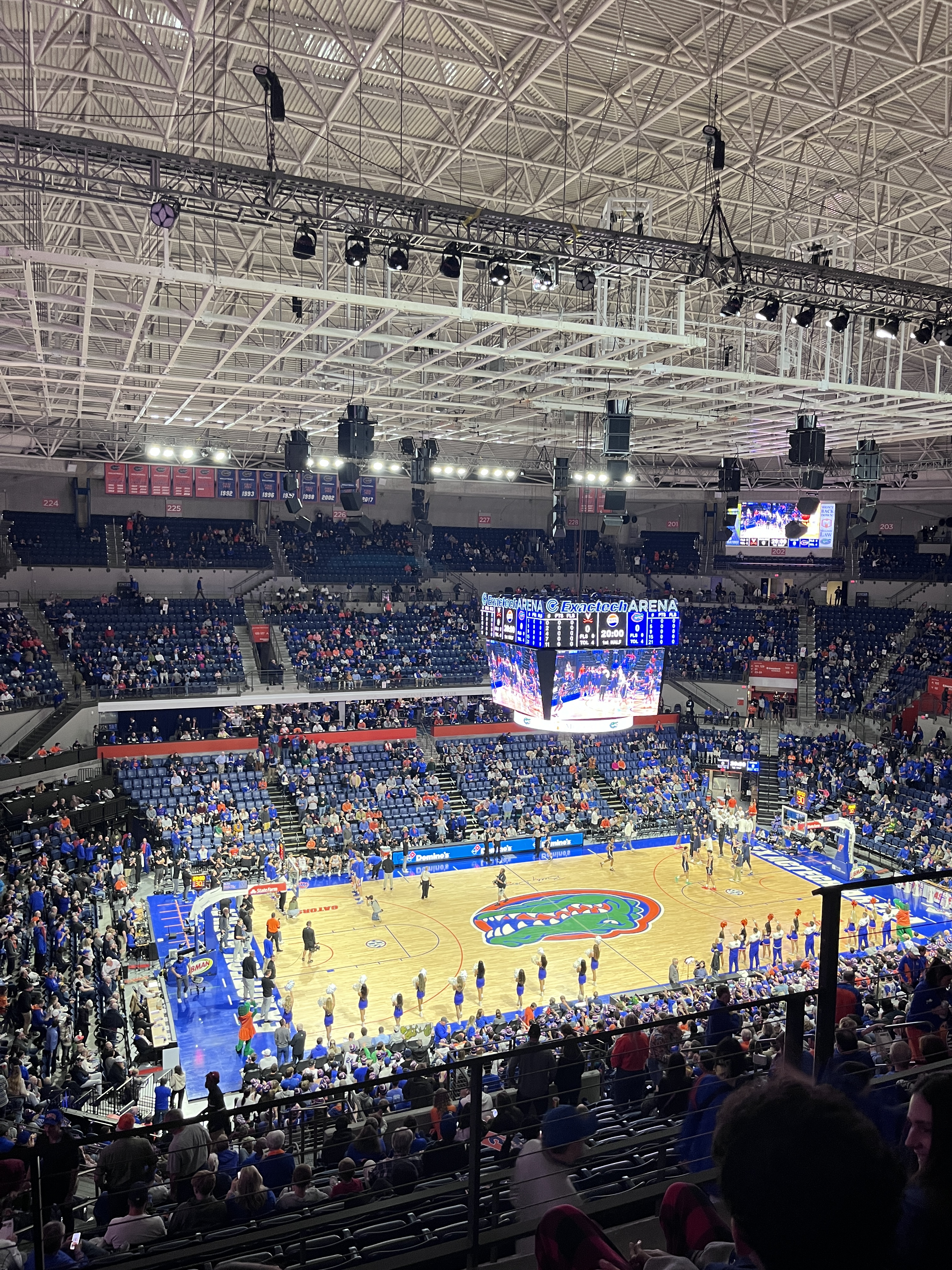
The interior of the O'Connell Center in 2024 before a men's basketball game versus Virginia

== See also ==
- Florida Gators
- History of the University of Florida
- List of University of Florida buildings
- List of University of Florida presidents
- List of NCAA Division I basketball arenas
- University Athletic Association
