= Liberty Pond =

Pond on the University of Florida campus in Gainesville, Florida

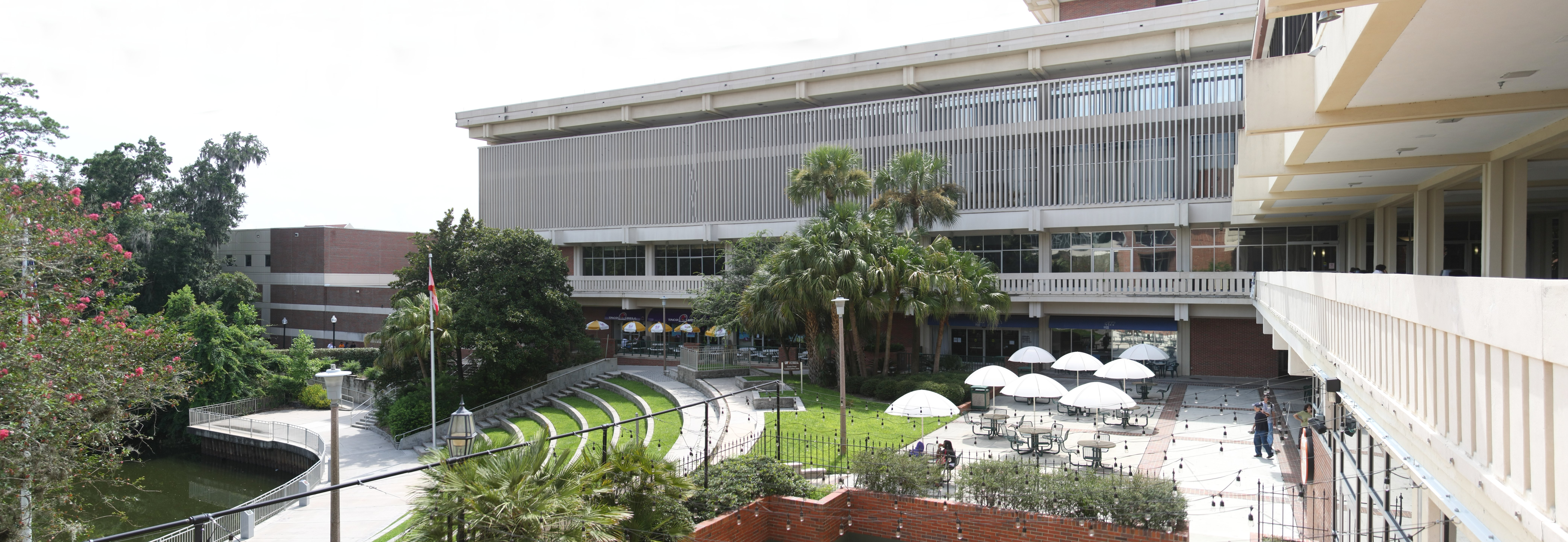
- Liberty Pond overlooked by the Reitz Union sometime before the buildings's 2016 expansion

- Location of Liberty Pond in Florida
- Location: Gainesville, Florida
- Coordinates: 29.6458033°N 82.3471212°W
- Basin countries: United States
- Residence time: Year round
- Surface elevation: 121 feet (37 m)
- Settlements: Gainesville, Florida

Liberty Pond (historically Green Pond) is a body of water on the campus of the University of Florida in Gainesville, Florida. The pond is named in honor of students and alumni of the university who have served in the United States Armed Forces. The pond has a veterans' memorial on its north shore and acts as a venue for memorial ceremonies held by local veterans' organizations.

Liberty Pond is overlooked by the J. Wayne Reitz Union, the student union of the University of Florida. The lake is a landmark on campus and has occasionally been included in social media marketing for the university and associated organizations.

Liberty Pond is over 100-years old and is likely a sinkhole lake. The pond is home to various species of alligators, birds (ranging from finches to hawks), and small mammals such as armadillos.

The pond was known as Green Pond until 2013, when the university board of trustees officially renamed the lake. In 2022, the US Board on Geographic Names officially recognized the name change after efforts by a student of the university. The name was additionally recognized by local, regional, and state officials.
