= Butler Plaza =

Retail complex in Gainesville, Florida

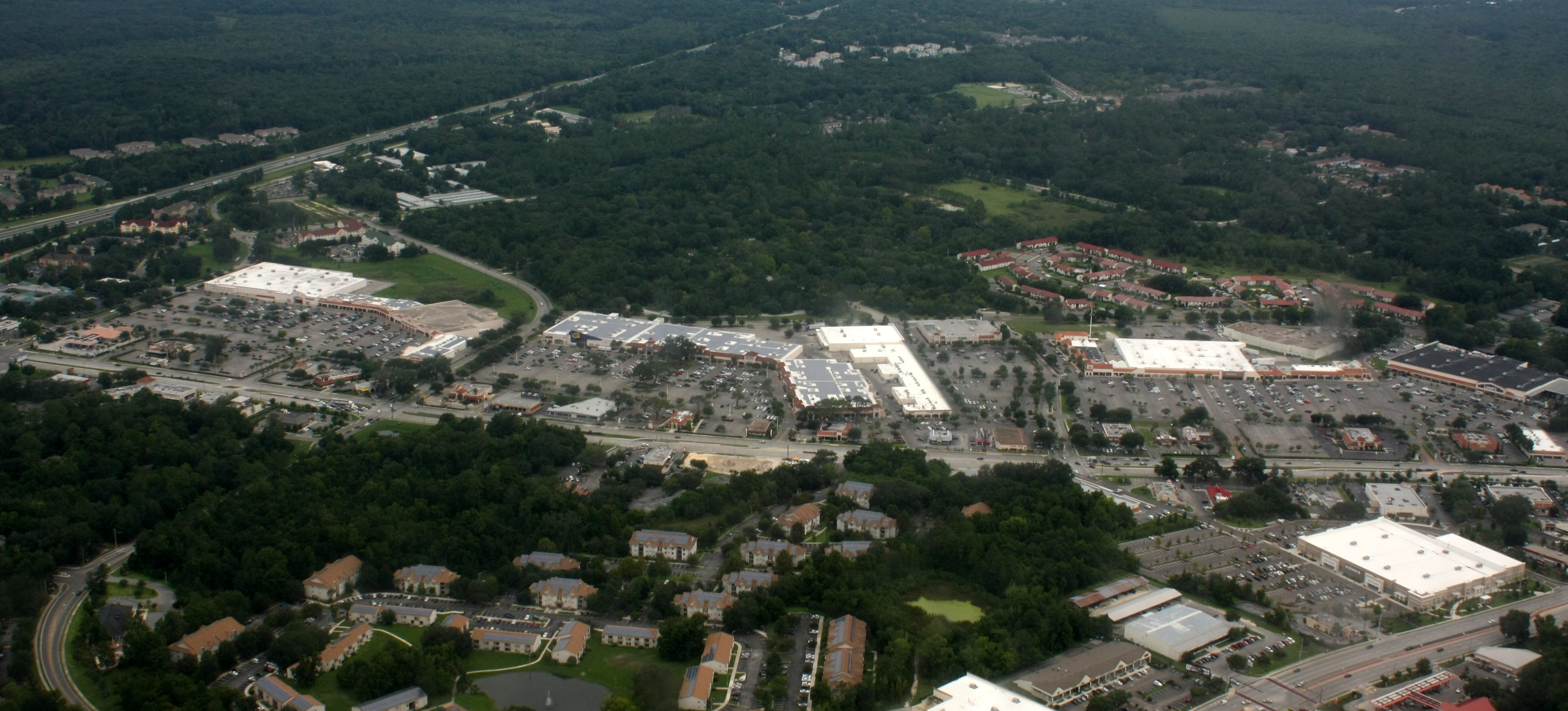
- Aerial view of Butler Plaza from the south (before the Butler North construction)
- Location: Gainesville, Florida, United States
- Coordinates: 29.622461°N 82.378555°W
- Developer: Clark and Deborah Butler
- Manager: Butler Enterprises
- Owner: Butler Enterprises
- Num. of stores: >100
- Num. of anchor tenants: 7
- Floor area: 1,950,000 sq ft (181,000 m^{2})
- Website: shopatbutler.com

Butler Plaza is a large retail complex located in southwest Gainesville, Florida. It is the largest retail power center in Florida and among the largest in the southeast United States. Built on the former site of Stengel Airport, which closed in 1971, the shopping center currently consists of three major sections: Plaza, North, and Town Center.

The complex is named for the late Clark Butler, who developed the area along with his daughter, Deborah Butler. It is sometimes nicknamed the "Miracle Mile" and "Restaurant Row" due to the number of restaurants. It is bordered by 34th Street on the east, Interstate 75 on the west, and Archer Road on the south. Anchor stores include Lowe's, Wal-Mart, Target, Best Buy, Sam's Club, and two Publix supermarkets.

== History ==
In 1970, Clark Butler, president of Butler Enterprises, purchased a landing strip between I-75 and the University of Florida. This land became the site of the beginnings of Butler Plaza and the original 300,000 sq ft complex broke ground in 1971. Clark Butler, president of Butler Enterprises, was the developer on the project. Initial tenants included Woolco Department Store, Eckerd Drugs and Publix Markets. The plaza opened for business in 1972. In 1977, the complex was purchased by Canadian investors. In the mid-1980s, Butler's daughter Deborah joined Butler Enterprises. In the 1990s, the shopping center expanded along Archer Road.

In 2007, Butler announced plans to expand the shopping center to the north into 160 acres (0.65 km^{2}) of vacant land, formerly occupied by a trailer park. These plans called for an additional 1,200,000 square feet (110,000 m^{2}) of retail space, 400 hotel rooms, and 200,000 square feet (19,000 m^{2}) of office space. In 2008, Butler Plaza was voluntarily annexed into the city of Gainesville. In 2008, the Butlers began working on expansion plans for the plaza and the creation of Butler Town Center. Clark Butler died in 2008 and Deborah continued the expansion. In 2013, the City Commission approved both land use and zoning amendments to the existing approved Butler Plaza expansion. The project broke ground in 2014 and Butler North opened in 2016. Butler Town Center opened in 2018 with several tenants, including Whole Foods and P.F Chang's.

== Adjacent facilities ==
=== Butler Town Center ===
Butler Town Center provides an open-air shopping experience consisting of 350,000 square feet of retail and dining space and a 45,000 square foot Stengel Field Food Hall, named after Gainesville's first school of aviation, Stengel Air Field which operated on the land from 1941 to 1971. It is anchored by a Regal Cinemas movie theater.

=== Butler Plaza ===
Butler Plaza is located along Archer Road, directly adjacent to Butler Town Center. Anchors include a Best Buy, Target, two Publix Grocery Stores, and several other medium-sized retailers. Butler Plaza comprises Butler Plaza West, Butler Plaza Central, and Esplanade at Butler Plaza.

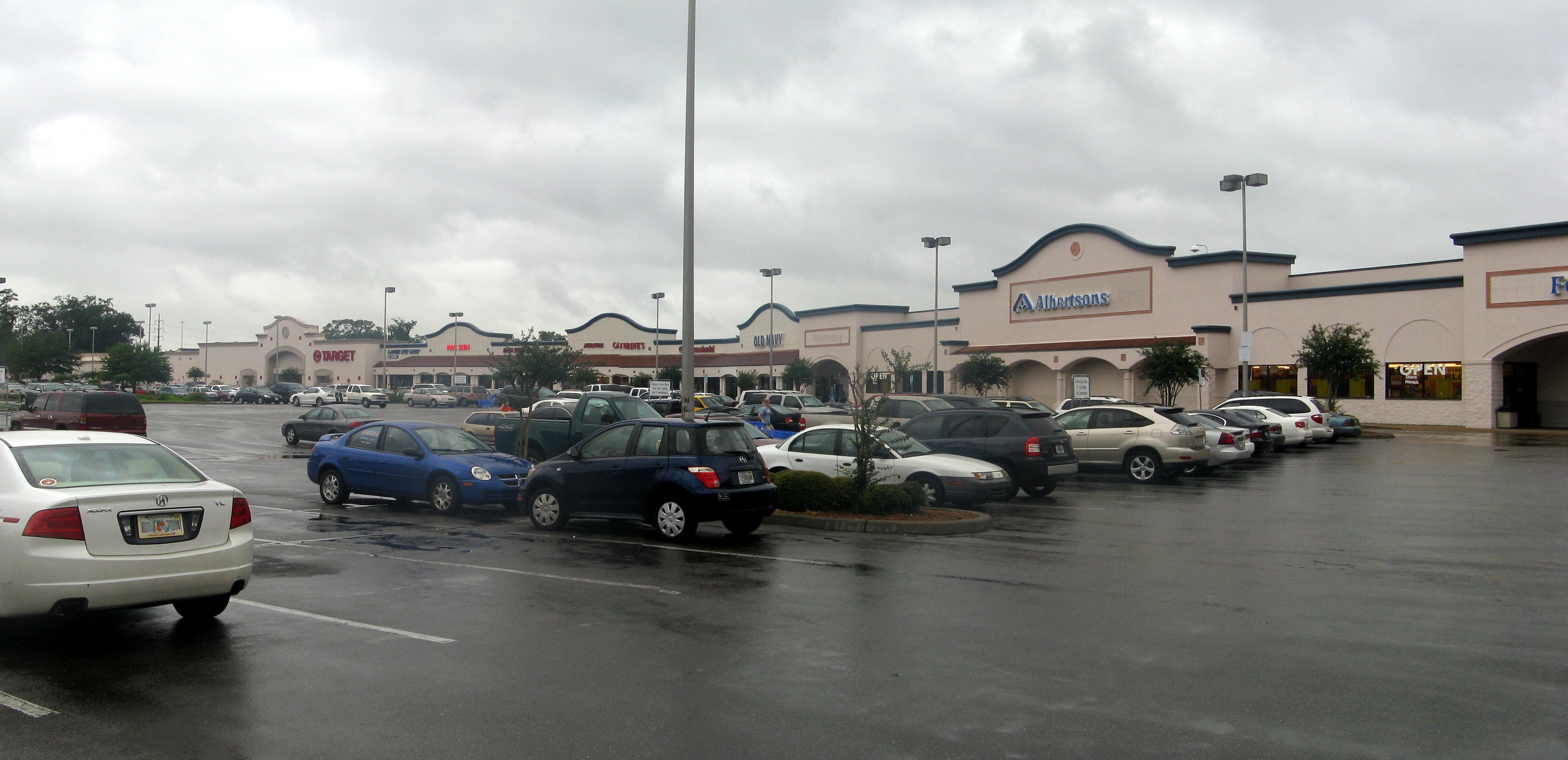
Butler Plaza in 2008, prior to the closing of Albertsons. The space is now occupied by Publix

=== Butler North ===
Butler North opened in 2016. It is the northernmost section of the complex and is separated from Butler Plaza Central by Windmeadows Boulevard.

== See also ==
- The Oaks Mall
