= Constans Theatre =

Performing arts venue in Florida, US

Coordinates: 29.6460662°N 82.3466301°W

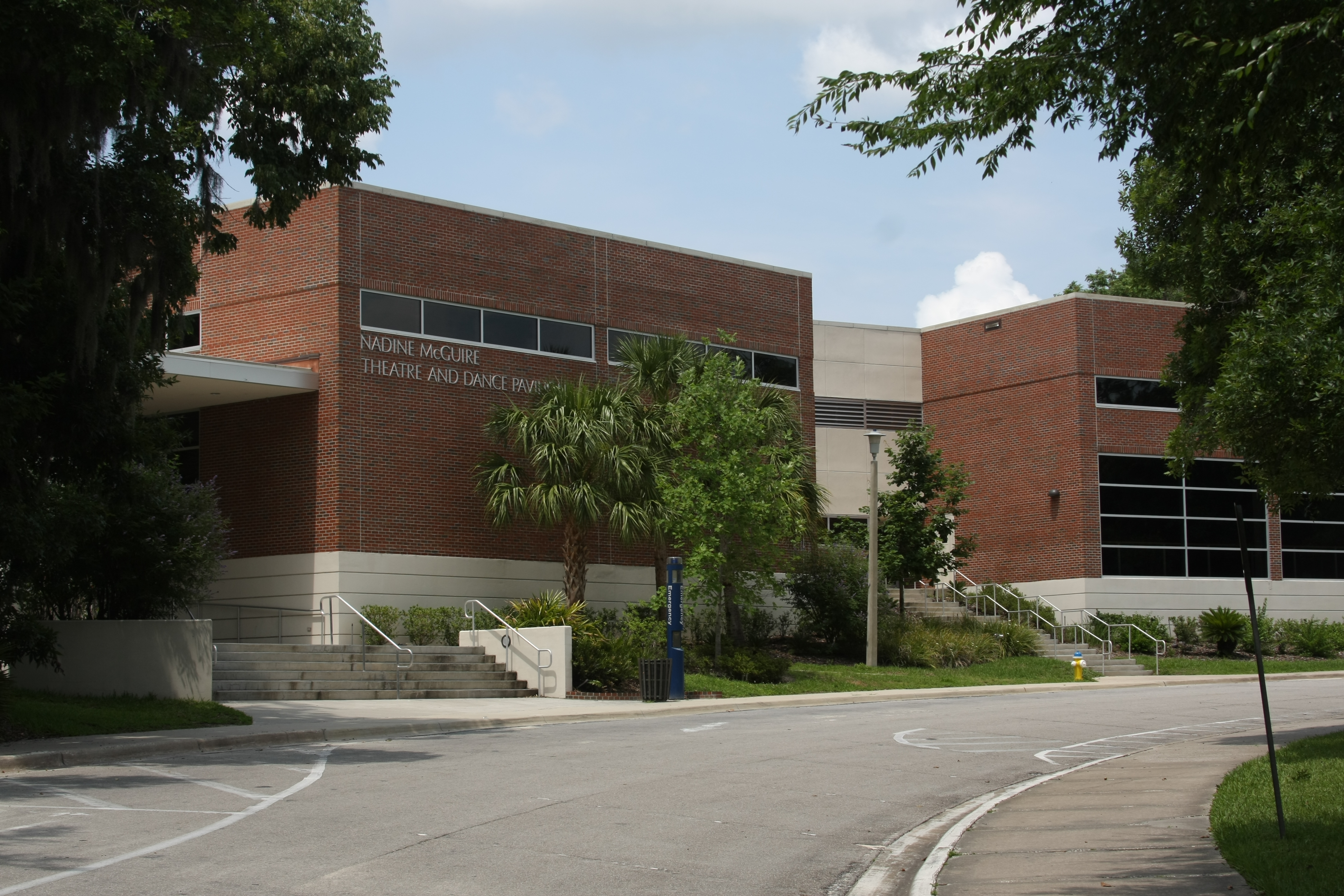
- McGuire Pavilion at Constans Theater
- Established: 1967
- Location: Gainesville, Florida, USA
- Website: Official Website

The Constans Theatre is a performing arts venue located on the University of Florida campus in Gainesville, Florida.

== History ==
The facility first opened in 1967, and currently serves as a venue for musical concerts, theater, dance, and lectures. The facility, upon completion, was named for Henry Philip Constans, the founder of the Florida Players (originally called the dramatic club of the University of Florida). He also headed the Department of Speech from 1931 to 1967 during which time he had the responsibility for the Florida Players both in advisory and directing capacities. Professor Constans and several other speech department faculty members served as directors of various plays presented by the student organization. Management of the Florida Players shifted from the Department of Speech to the Theatre Department when this department was created in 1971.

== Location ==
Renovated in 2004 and adjacent to the Reitz Union, the H. Philip Constans Theatre houses a 415-seat proscenium used as the main stage and primary producing space.

The venue is located on McCarty Drive, and is adjacent to the J. Wayne Reitz Union. Constans Theatre is a sub-venue of the Nadine McGuire Pavilion and Dance Pavilion, and is part of the School of Theatre and Dance.

== Facilities ==
The Theatre includes:

- An 18 by 40 flexible apron theatre.
- Overall 415 seats are available.
