= Gainesville Regional Airport =

Airport in Florida, U.S.

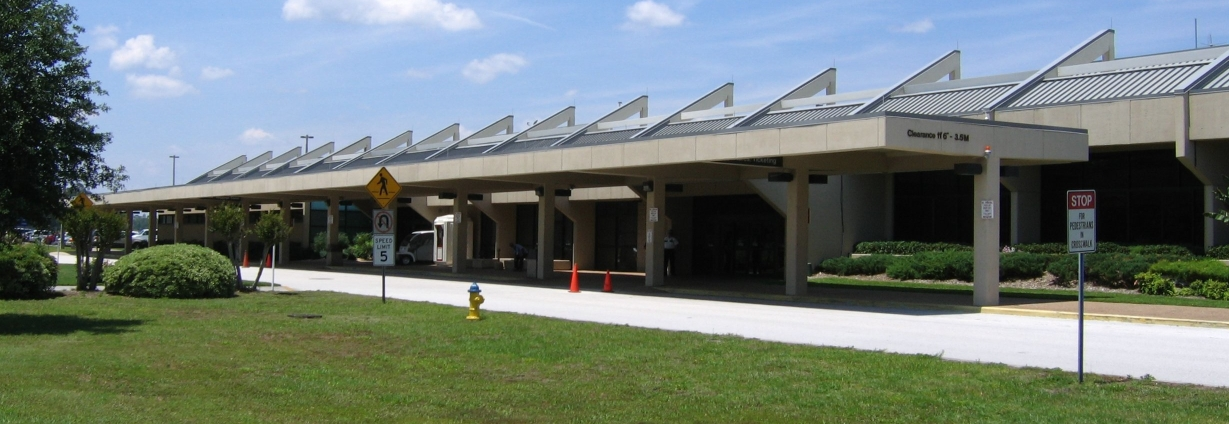
- The exterior of Gainesville Regional Airport's passenger terminal in 2005
- IATA: GNV; ICAO: KGNV; FAA LID: GNV; WMO: 74756

Summary
- Airport type: Public
- Owner: City of Gainesville
- Operator: Gainesville-Alachua County Regional Airport Authority
- Serves: Gainesville, Florida
- Location: within Gainesville municipal boundary
- Elevation AMSL: 151 ft (46 m)
- Coordinates: 29°41′24″N 082°16′18″W
- Website: www.flygainesville.com

Maps
- FAA airport diagram
- Interactive map of Gainesville Regional Airport

Runways
Direction	Length		Surface
Direction	ft	m	Surface
11/29	7,504	2,287	Asphalt
07/25	4,158	1,267	Asphalt

Statistics (2022)
- Total passengers (2022): 535,694 ▲38%
- Total enplanements: 266,349 ▲16.8%
- Aircraft operations: 72,385 ▲15.1%
- Based aircraft: 7,814 ▲36%
- Source: Federal Aviation Administration

Gainesville Regional Airport (IATA: GNV, ICAO: KGNV, FAA LID: GNV) is a public airport three miles northeast of Gainesville, in Alachua County, Florida, United States. It is owned by Gainesville-Alachua County Regional Airport Authority. The National Plan of Integrated Airport Systems for 2011–2015 categorized it as a primary commercial service airport (more than 10,000 enplanements per year).

Gainesville Regional Airport had 177,282 passenger boardings (enplanements) in calendar year 2011 and 159,499 enplanements in 2010. They also had 217,355 passenger boardings (enplanements) in 2015, more than 2% higher than 2014.

Gainesville Regional Airport had 558,246 passengers in 2019.

The airport annually hosts the Gator Fly In at the general aviation facilities. The event includes military aircraft displays, a classic car show, food trucks, live music, and aircraft rides aboard a Ford Trimotor, a Cessna 172, and on helicopters.

== History ==
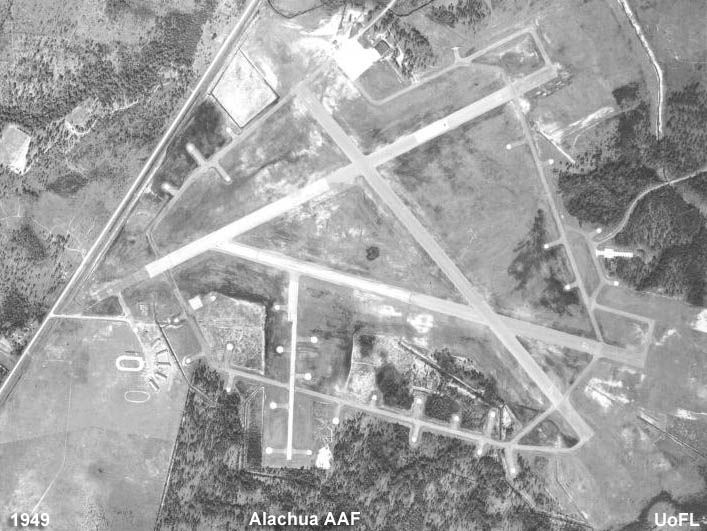
Alachua Army Airfield in 1949

Construction of the airport began in April 1940 as a Works Project Administration project. In 1941 initial construction was completed. Upon conclusion of the construction by the United States Army Corps of Engineers, the facility was known as the Alachua Army Airfield and was used by the Army Air Corps and the Army Air Forces.

The airfield was declared surplus in September 1945 and turned over to the Army Corps of Engineers on October 1, 1946. The War Assets Administration deeded the facility to the city of Gainesville in 1948 as a civil airport. The field was known as John R. Alison Airport or Gainesville Municipal Airport; the city operated, maintained, and improved the airport, which was renamed the Gainesville Regional Airport in October 1977. The airline terminal was dedicated to John R. Alison in 1979.

Eastern Airlines served Gainesville beginning in the 1950s, with flights to Tallahassee, Jacksonville and Ocala, eventually offering nonstop flights to Atlanta and Miami by the 1970s. Eastern served Gainesville until its bankruptcy in 1991 and was consistently a profitable destination for the company. Air Florida served Gainesville in the late 1970s and early 1980s, with flights to Miami, Tampa and Ocala.

In 1986 the State Legislature passed a bill that established the Airport as the Gainesville-Alachua County Regional Airport Authority. The Airport Authority has nine board members, five selected by the City of Gainesville, three by the Governor and one by Alachua County, and continues to oversee the Airport.

On October 31, 2004 Gainesville Regional Airport hosted Air Force One during George W. Bush's re-election campaign. 17,000 people attended the event. They hosted Air Force Two in 2023 after Hurricane Idalia.

In recent years the Airport has substantially completed several projects: the refurbishment of its primary runway (11/29), piping of an open ditch parallel to that runway, and completion of two phases of the Terminal Renovation project. Three passenger boarding bridges have been installed.

Eclipse Aviation, maker of the Eclipse 500, operated its first factory service center in Gainesville until the company declared bankruptcy in 2009. In 2012 Silver Airways moved its maintenance facilities from Ft. Lauderdale into the existing Eclipse Aviation facility. Silver provided commercial airline service to several destinations around Florida and Bahamas at the time. In April 2015, Silver Airways moved its maintenance to Orlando International. However, in 2023, Silver Airways announced they would return to Gainesville with service to Fort Lauderdale–Hollywood International Airport. But after about 1 year of service to Gainesville, Silver announced in August 2024 that they would shut down their service due to low demand and a 28% on-time rate.

The airport's control tower operates from 6:45a to 10:30p daily.

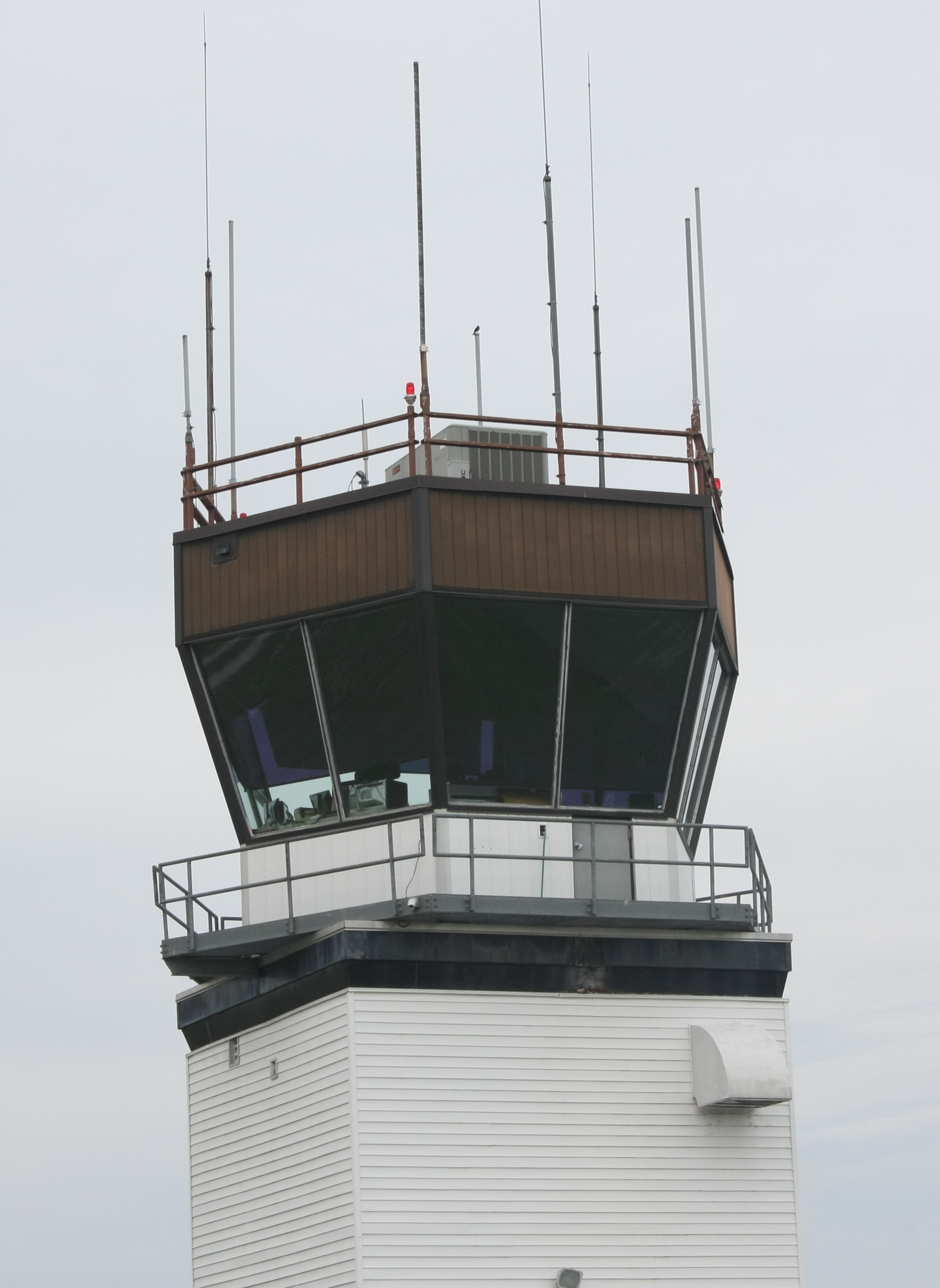
Control Tower

After the death of musician Tom Petty, a Gainesville native, on October 2, 2017, a change.org petition was started to have the airport renamed "Tom Petty - Gainesville Regional Airport", although as of 2025 the petition is no longer up and has been canceled.

In 2021, Gainesville Regional Airport added a 15,200 square-foot expansion onto their terminal. The new expansion adds a mother lactation room, a pet relief area, two new gates, hundreds of new seats with charging ports, a departure and arrival board, and an area for a food/store vendor. In addition to the expansion, the existing terminal was given a renovation. The project cost $16 million, funded mostly by a $12 million grant from the FAA.

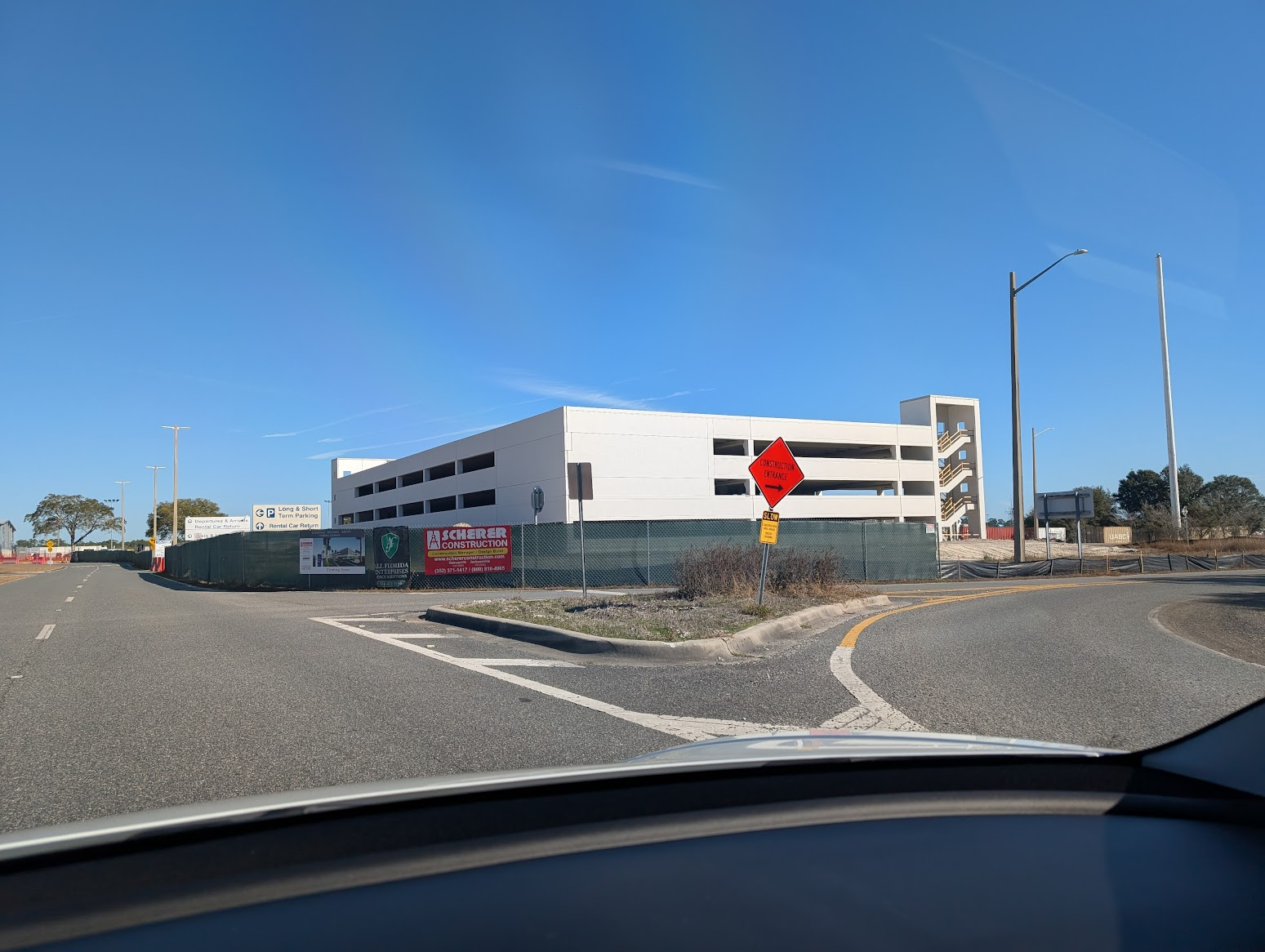
New parking garage construction as of January 2025

In February 2024, the airport broke ground on a new four story 418-space parking garage to alleviate parking concerns. The garage will also house new ride-sharing pickup points and bus service and is expected to open by July 2025.

In September 2024, the Gainesville Regional Airport announced an agreement to install an electric charging station that can charge electric aircraft.

The airport served a record 578,000 passengers in 2024.

== Facilities and aircraft ==
=== Aircraft ===
The airport covers 1,650 acres (670 ha) and has two asphalt runways: 11/29 is 7,504 by 150 feet (2,287 x 46 m) and 07/25 is 4,158 by 100 feet (1,267 x 30 m).

In August 2021, the Gainesville City Commission approved FAA grants to cover engineering costs for improvements to the apron and taxiway and costs incurred during the COVID-19 pandemic.

In the year ending September 30, 2022 the airport had 68,032 aircraft operations, average 186 per day: 78% general aviation, 9% airline, 7% military, and 6% air taxi. 173 aircraft at that time were based at the airport: 98 single-engine and 18 multi-engine airplanes, 51 jet, and 6 helicopter.

=== Facilities ===
==== FBO ====
Gainesville Regional Airport has one full service FBO, University Air Center. There were previously two: Gulf Atlantic Airways and Flight Line. Flight Line's contract with the airport authority expired and Gulf Atlantic became University Air Center. University Air Center has a pilots lounge with TV, snack machines, aircraft rentals and charters, flight instruction, and fuel.

==== Terminal ====
Gainesville Regional Airport's terminal has 5 gates. Gates 3, 4, and 5 are used by American Eagle. Gates 1 and 2 are used by Delta Air Lines and Delta Connection.

The airport terminal has a restaurant and bar as well as a gift shop, operated by Tailwind.

The airport's ground transportation is served by taxis; rental car companies; an RTS bus stop serving routes 25, 26, and 39; and hotel shuttle buses.

Renovations that were completed in 2021 added 2 additional gates to the facility, in addition to a larger baggage screening area, and additional parking spaces. The terminal expansion and improvement project was completed July 29, 2021, and also added additional restrooms, additional food and beverage areas, a lactation room, an airport chapel, and a pet relief area, in addition to 2 additional gates.

== Airlines and destinations ==
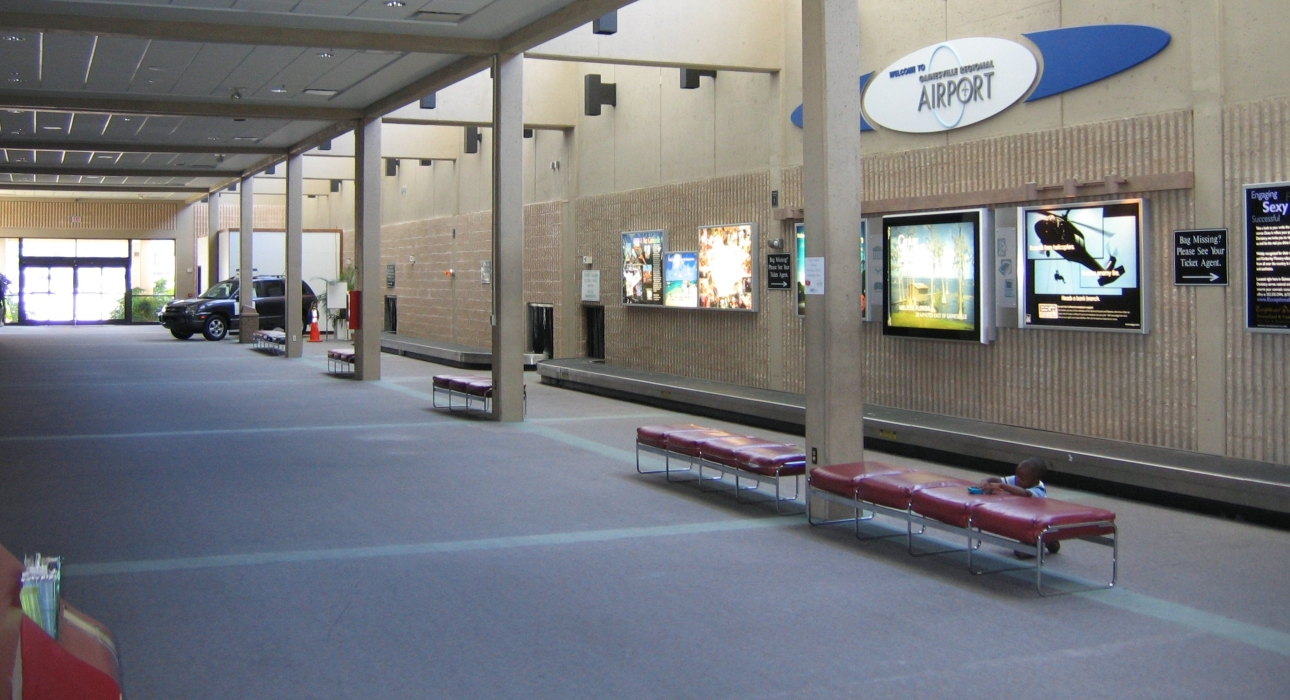
Airport Interior, West Lobby

=== Passenger ===
Airlines	Destinations
American Eagle	Charlotte, Dallas/Fort Worth, Miami
Delta Air Lines	Atlanta

== Statistics ==
Annual Passenger Enplanements at GNV, 2000 - 2019
Year	Passengers	Year	Passengers
2000	144,996	2010	164,977
2001	121,152	2011	183,091
2002	135,106	2012	196,840
2003	124,747	2013	204,924
2004	141,213	2014	208,262
2005	173,326	2015	217,358
2006	159,958	2016	206,330
2007	148,501	2017	218,578
2008	141,077	2018	236,019
2009	134,614	2019	273,253

=== Total passengers ===
Annual passenger traffic (enplaned + deplaned) at GNV, 2009 to present
Year	Passengers	Growth
2009	268,700	▲1.9%
2010	298,505	▲11.2%
2011	359,826	▲21%
2012	381,584	▲6.2%
2013	401,651	▲5.1%
2014	410,568	▲2.3%
2015	433,113	▲5.5%
2016	421,700	▼2.7%
2017	436,184	▲3.5%
2018	476,396	▲6%
2019	558,246	▲17.2%
2020	239,000	▼57.2%
2021	384,790	▲61.2%
2022	535,694	▲39.2%
2023	531,246	▼0.8%
2024	578,175	▲8.8%

=== Top destinations ===
Busiest domestic routes from Gainesville (FL) (August 2025 – July 2026)
Rank	City	Passengers
1	(Georgia (U.S. state)) Atlanta, Georgia	155,400
2	Charlotte, North Carolina	64,020
3	Dallas/Fort Worth, Texas	43,720
4	Miami, Florida	18,810

== Accidents and incidents ==
- On April 26, 2001, a Cessna 210 operating a Part 135 cargo flight experienced a landing gear collapse at the Gainesville Regional Airport. The pilot noted a problem with the airplane's radios earlier in the flight, which lead him to notice and troubleshoot a larger electrical problem. The pilot shut down the airplane's electrical system before operating its landing gear, though he did feel the landing gear motor operate normally; he could not see the landing gear position light due to sunlight. After touchdown, the main landing gear collapsed; the nose landing gear did not collapse. The probable cause of the accident was found to be the pilot's delay in securing all non-essential electrical equipment in-flight resulting in battery depletion before complete gear extension was accomplished using the normal system and subsequent collapse of the main landing gear.
- On April 15, 2002, a Pitts S1C Special collided with terrain and nosed over during landing at the Gainesville Regional Airport. After a sequence of touch-and-go landings, the pilot made a slight turn to the left on approach to Runway 10. The airplane then made a right turn into the ground. The airplane came to rest in a nose low attitude. The probable cause of the accident was found to be the pilot's failure to maintain clearance from the ground during an attempted go-around.
- On September 10, 2004, a Maule M4 flipped over while landing at the Gainesville Regional Airport. During the landing rollout, the pilot-rated passenger inadvertently applied both wheel brakes and the airplane nosed over.
- On April 16, 2006, a Beech B-60 Duke crashed just after departure from the Gainesville Regional Airport. A witness reported the airplanes banked sharply to the left just after liftoff before stabilizing and turning towards the east; however, the airplane turned sharply left and rolled inverted before going into a sharp dive and impacting the west end of the airport's terminal. The reason for the loss of control could not be determined.
- On February 14, 2008, a Cessna 172 was damaged after a hard landing at the Gainesville Regional Airport.
- On November 7, 2008, a Partenavia P.68 crashed while on approach to the Gainesville Regional Airport. The flight was a medical evacuation flight operating under Part 135 carrying a patient to treatment at the University of Florida hospital. The pilot started an ILS approach to the airport before dropping off radar. The probable cause of the accident was found to be the pilot's failure to maintain the proper glidepath during an instrument-landing-system approach.
- On November 1, 2009, a Beech 77 Skipper crashed while approaching the Gainesville Regional Airport. During the roundout and flare, the airplane veered left and its right wing lifted. The pilot initiated a go-around, but the airplane was "already in a stall" and impacted a sign before ultimately coming to rest in the grass. The probable cause of the accident was found to be the pilot's failure to maintain aircraft control during landing.
- On March 19, 2011, a Christen Eagle II crashed while landing at the Gainesville Regional Airport. According to the air traffic controller on duty, the airplane was on final when it yawed, rolled right, and nosed into the ground. The probable cause of the accident was found to be the pilot's failure to maintain airspeed while turning from base leg to final approach, which resulted in an aerodynamic stall and collision with the ground.
- On October 12, 2011, a Cessna 182 Skylane was damaged while landing at the Gainesville Regional Airport. The airplane descended rapidly on short approach; though the pilot added engine power to arrest the descent, the airplane landed hard, causing substantial damage to the engine firewall.
- On August 11, 2014, a Piper PA-34 Seneca was damaged during landing at the Gainesville Regional Airport. After diverting to Gainesville due to thunderstorms in the area, the aircraft bounced on landing, resulting in substantial damage to the forward bulkhead and windshield center post.
- On April 29, 2018, a Cessna 310 struck a tree while on its approach to land in Gainesville. The pilot recovered and landed normally.
- On May 31, 2018, Allegiant Air Flight 1304 made an emergency landing in Gainesville due to a medical emergency involving the pilot. On the flight from Cincinnati to Punta Gorda, the pilot had a seizure, and the flight diverted to Gainesville. The pilot was immediately brought to the hospital. There were no other injuries or deaths.

== See also ==
- List of airports in Florida
