= Gainesville Mall =

Former shopping mall in Florida, United States

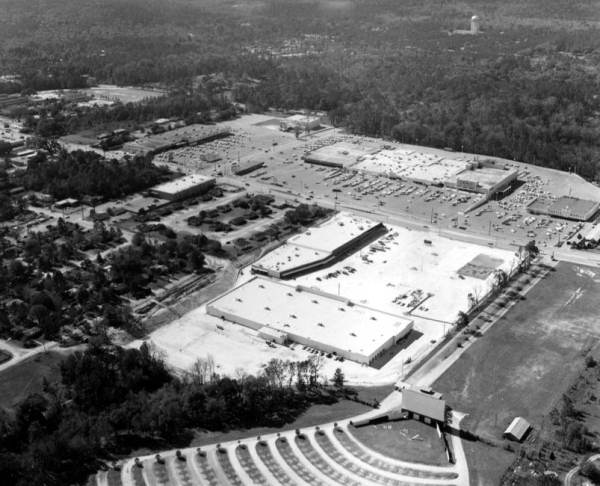
- Aerial view, 1971
- Location: Gainesville, Florida, United States
- Coordinates: 29°40′33″N 82°20′27″W
- Address: 2564 N.W. 13th Street
- Opened: 1968
- Closed: 1993
- Num. of anchor tenants: 2
- Floors: 1

The Gainesville Mall was the first enclosed shopping mall in Gainesville, Florida. It was located on the northwest corner of the intersection of NW 13th Street (US 441) and NW 23rd Avenue and operated from Fall 1968 to 1993.

The Gainesville Mall closed permanently in 1993 after years of decline and was initially replaced with a Kmart. The Kmart was demolished in 2004 and replaced by a Lowe's that opened in 2006 and still resides there.

== History ==
When the mall opened in 1968, it has two anchors: Sears on the south side, and Tampa-based Maas Brothers on the north side. The mall played a major role in establishing a retail corridor along NW 13th Street. This retail corridor would end up replacing downtown Gainesville as the area's commercial center.

In 1977, The Oaks Mall, a larger indoor mall, opened across town near Interstate 75. Sears would relocate to its store to The Oaks Mall in 1983, leaving Maas Brothers as the only anchor at the Gainesville Mall.

In 1991, Maas Brothers was merged with Burdines by the parent company of the two stores. Despite the fact that Burdines operated a store at The Oaks Mall since 1983, the company retained its store at the Gainesville Mall for a few years. The Maas Brothers store was officially rebranded as Burdines on October 20, 1991.
