= J. Wayne Reitz Union =

Student union of the University of Florida

University of Florida J. Wayne Reitz Union
- Reitz Union
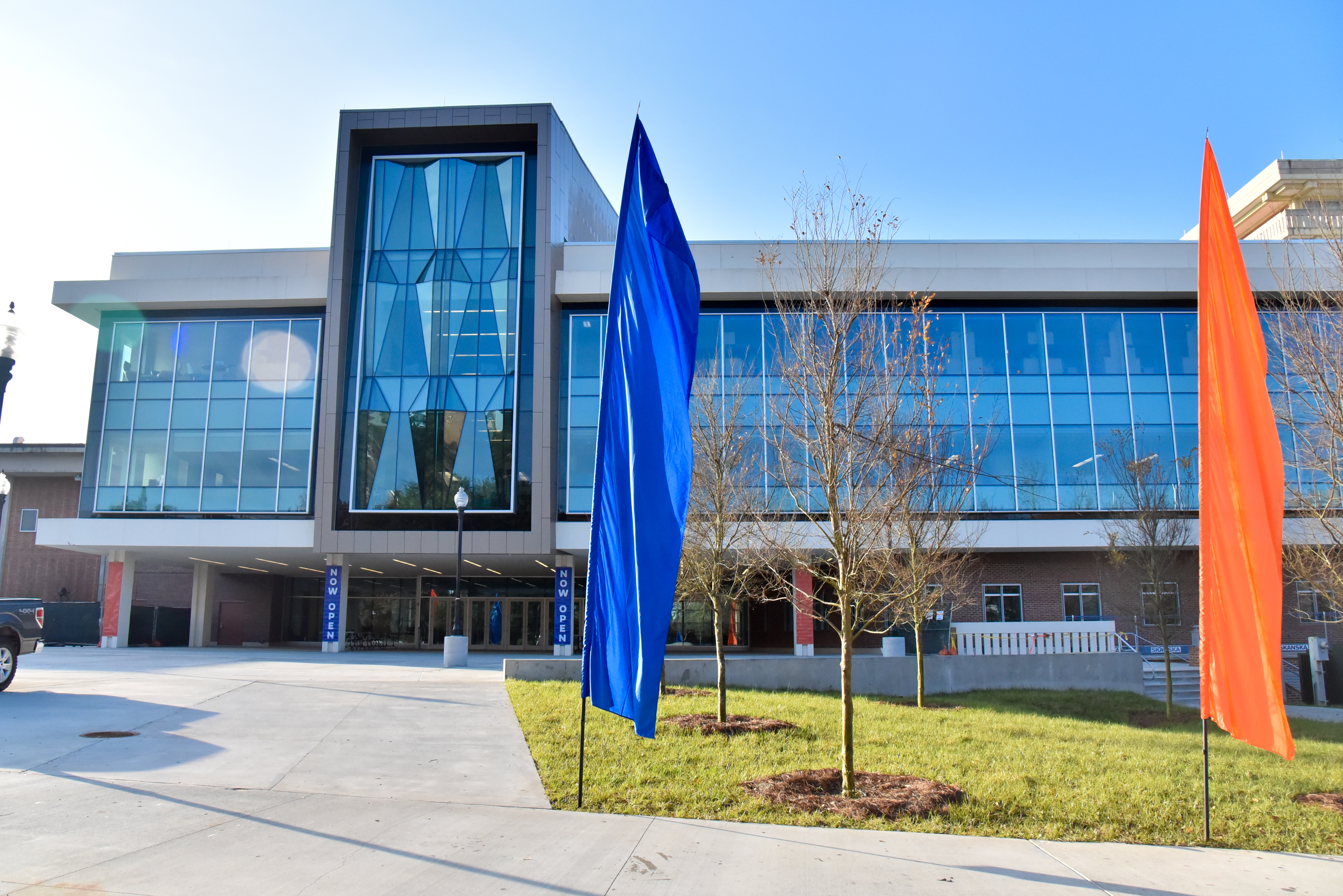
- Interactive map of the University of Florida; J. Wayne Reitz Union area

General information
- Type: Student union
- Location: Gainesville, Florida, United States
- Coordinates: 29°38′46″N 82°20′52″W
- Completed: 1967
- Renovated: 1975, 1992, 1998, 2002, 2016

Design and construction
- Architect: Barrett, Daffin

Website
- http://www.union.ufl.edu/

The J. Wayne Reitz Union is the student union of the University of Florida, located on Museum Road on the university campus in Gainesville, Florida, United States. The union was named in honor of J. Wayne Reitz, the fifth president of the university, who served from 1955 to 1967. The building, which was originally completed in 1967, contains dining facilities, meeting rooms, offices, a computer lab, a game room, an outdoor amphitheater, retail stores, a movie theater and a hotel.

East of the Reitz Union is the Constans Theatre, a performing arts venue. Although the two buildings are connected, the Constans Theatre is not managed by the union.

== History ==
=== Background and opening ===
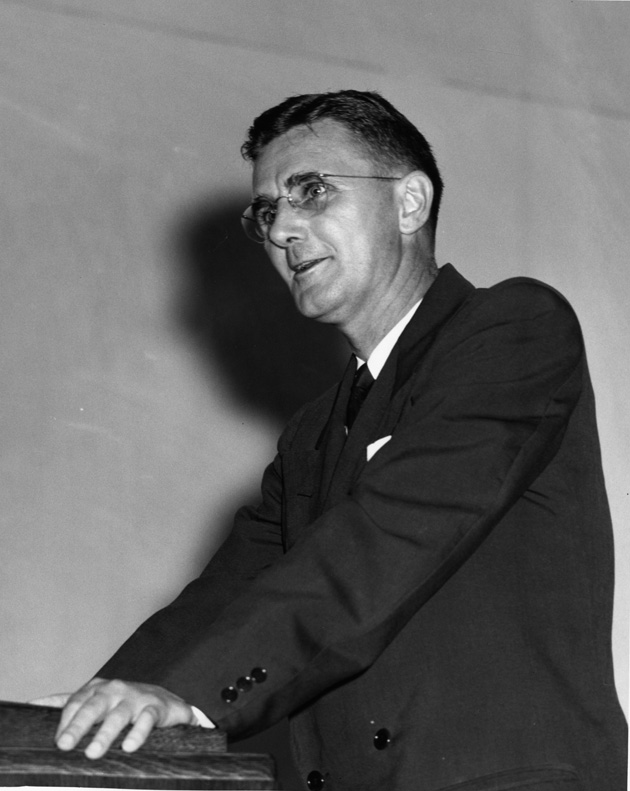
J. Wayne Reitz, fifth president of the University of Florida and namesake of the student union.

The University of Florida's original student union building was called the Florida Union and opened in 1936 (now known as Dauer Hall). At the request of president Albert A. Murphree, former U.S. Senator William James Bryan assisted in the fund-raising for the Florida Union, and he was aided by the students who agreed to pay an extra fee so that the facility could be built. However, in time, the sentiment was that this building was too small and a new student union would have to be erected to meet the demands.

Plans for the new facility were crafted in 1948, however the project wasn't approved until May 1962.

Financing for the union was accomplished by a statewide revenue certificate program for higher education generated and supported by fees of students of all state institutions of Florida. The financial start was in October 1951, when the student body voted a small fee to be set aside for the construction of this facility. Subsequent actions by the student body, the university administration, the Board of Control (now the Board of Regents), and the State Board of Education made the union possible. There were no tax funds used in the construction or furnishings of the building. One approved, it took two years to secure funding, and the ground breaking was on May 9, 1964. The building was officially completed and opened to the students on May 1, 1967. In 1975, unfinished sections of the basement level were converted into meeting rooms.

=== Expansions from 1991–2003 ===
Additional meeting rooms were constructed above the union colonnade, and the Career Resource Center (now the Career Connections Center) was expanded in 1991. In 1992, the game room was expanded. 1995 brought several changes, including the addition of a new wing to house the Career Connections Center, converting the existing cafeteria/snack bar area into a food court and the addition of retail space on the ground floor. These projects were completed in 1998. In 2002, the Grand Ballroom opened above the Career Connections Center.

In 2003, the UF Bookstore and Welcome Center was completed. The expansion, which is connected to the Reitz Union through an expanded food court, includes a parking garage, along with a new bookstore. The bookstore, along with the student ID card services, replaced existing facilities located at The Hub.

=== Expansions and renovations in the 2010s ===
==== Renew Your Reitz campaign (2010) ====
In February 2010, university president Bernie Machen, members of the university's board of trustees, student leaders, and other university officials launched an aggressive campaign to spend $90 million to make repairs and expand the outdated building, which has an estimated $42.5 million in needed repairs. The expansion would include a 24-hour study center, a new parking garage (750 spaces), an expanded printing lab, more restaurant selections, new multipurpose meeting rooms, a 1,500-seat auditorium, and a cutting-edge fitness center. About $60 million of this cost would come from a proposed student fee, which would increase tuition rates by $3 per credit hour plus a $20 flat fee each semester. This fee would likely be in effect for the next 30 years.

From February 23–24, 2010, about 9,775 UF students voted on this issue, with nearly 56% voting against the proposed fee to cover repairs of the Reitz Union, and 55% voting against funding the expansion. The Student Government will explore multiple alternative sources for renovating the aging student center, including the Public Education Capital Outlay, and the Capital Improvement Trust Fund, a fund to which all public university students contribute.

==== Make It Reitz (2013–2016) ====
In summer 2013, the Reitz Union began an extensive renovation and expansion project which added an additional 126,000 square feet and renovated 90,000 square feet of the existing building. The construction included offices and support space for student organizations and space for Student Government, offices and program space for the David and Wanda Brown Center for Leadership and Service, the Department of Student Activities and Involvement, the Office of Multicultural and Diversity Affairs, Reitz Union Programs and GatorWell Health Promotion Services.

The doors to the renovated and expanded facility opened on February 1, 2016. The 2016 renovations cost $70.7 million.

=== Protests in the 2020s ===
In the summer and fall of 2020, protests to change the name of the Reitz Union were held. UF students criticized Reitz as a namesake for the student center, as he was "accused of racism," due to his segregationist stance, which included stalling integration efforts during his tenure as UF President.

Students also criticized Reitz's allowing of UF faculty and students to be accused of "homosexual behavior." In response to a petition on this issue, UF President Kent Fuchs ushered initiatives to address racism on campus; among them was a task force to assess whether some campus buildings should be renamed. However, students protested further due to the task force's slow pace of action.

In January 2021, a boycott of the food court within the Reitz Union was launched; the Gainesville Chapter of the Dream Defenders, UF NAACP, the UF Black Student Union and the Coalition to Abolish Prison Slavery at UF organized the boycott to pressure UF into moving off of Aramark as a food supplier for the university. Aramark's use of prison labor was cited as reason for the boycott.

== Facility specifics ==
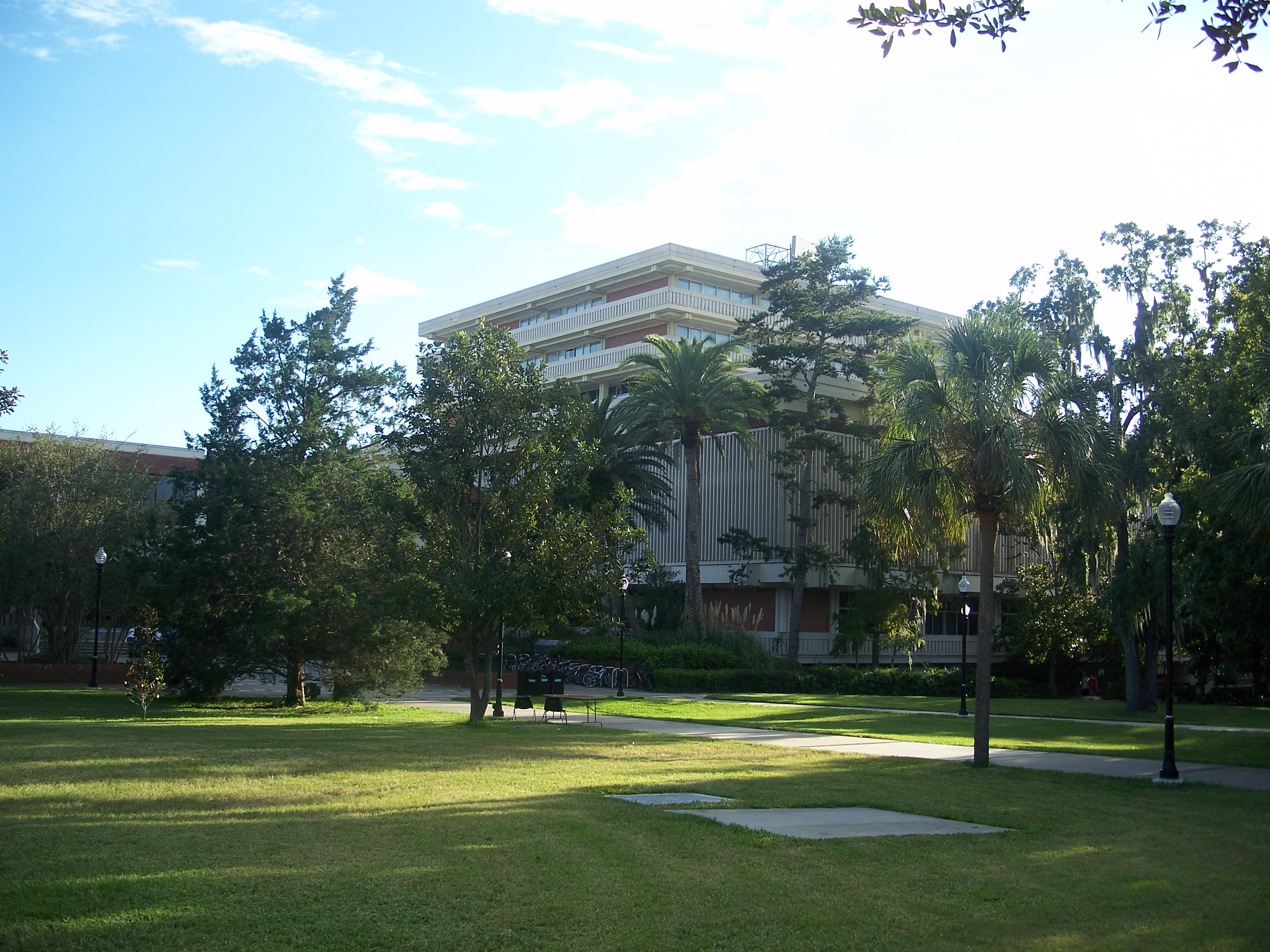
View from a distance

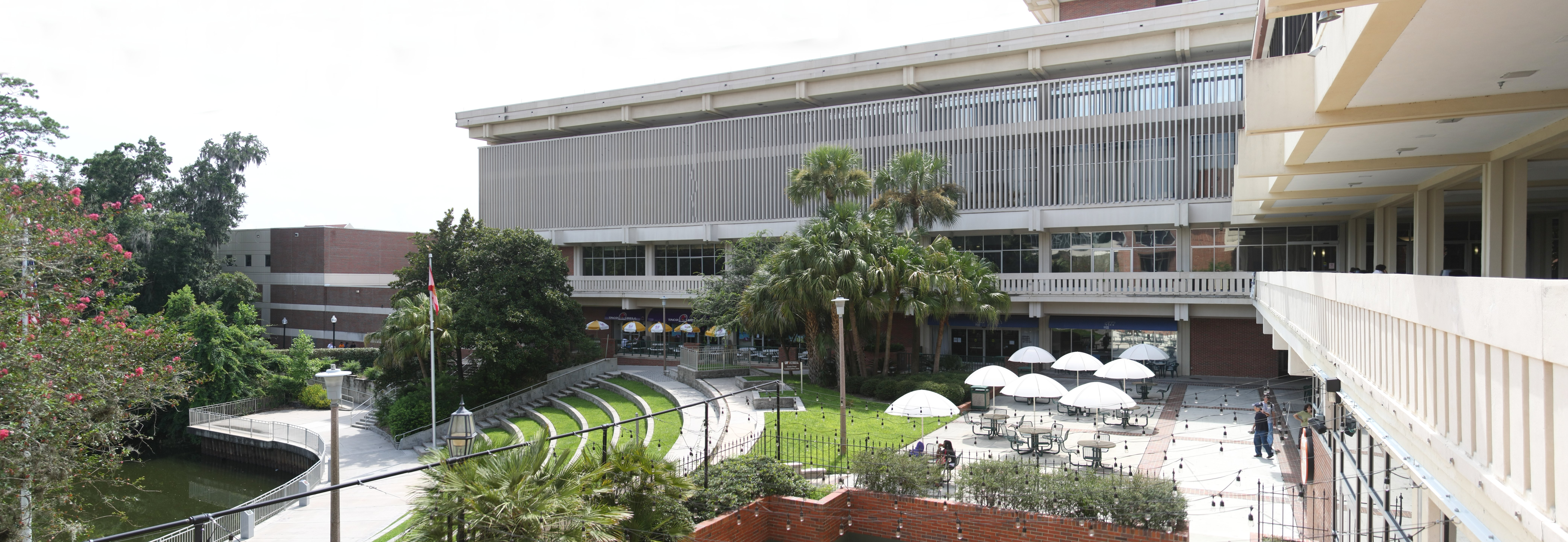
A view of the Reitz Union, looking west from the Constans Theatre, Liberty Pond is in the left of the image

- In 1967, the official size of the structure was 267,000 square feet (24,800 m^{2}).
- The total cost at that time was $5.7 million.
- The cost of construction was $4.4 million.
- The architects for the project were Barrett, Daffin and Bishop of Tallahassee, Florida, and Moore and May of Gainesville, Florida.

== Union amenities ==
The Student Union is home to many services and shops for student convenience. Shops are owned by both corporations and the University, and upper levels contain meeting rooms for student organizations and a hotel. The union has eight levels including the Lower Level/plaza. Inside the union is a bicycle repair facility, sponsored by the University of Florida Student Government. A full map of the building is viewable at the Reitz Union website. Both Student Government and the Inter-Residence Hall Association meet at the Senate chambers at the building.

=== Lower Level ===
- Arts and Crafts Center
- SG Computer Lab
- Dance Studios
- Maintenance, A/V Services, Productions, Housekeeping, and IT Services department offices

=== Ground Level ===
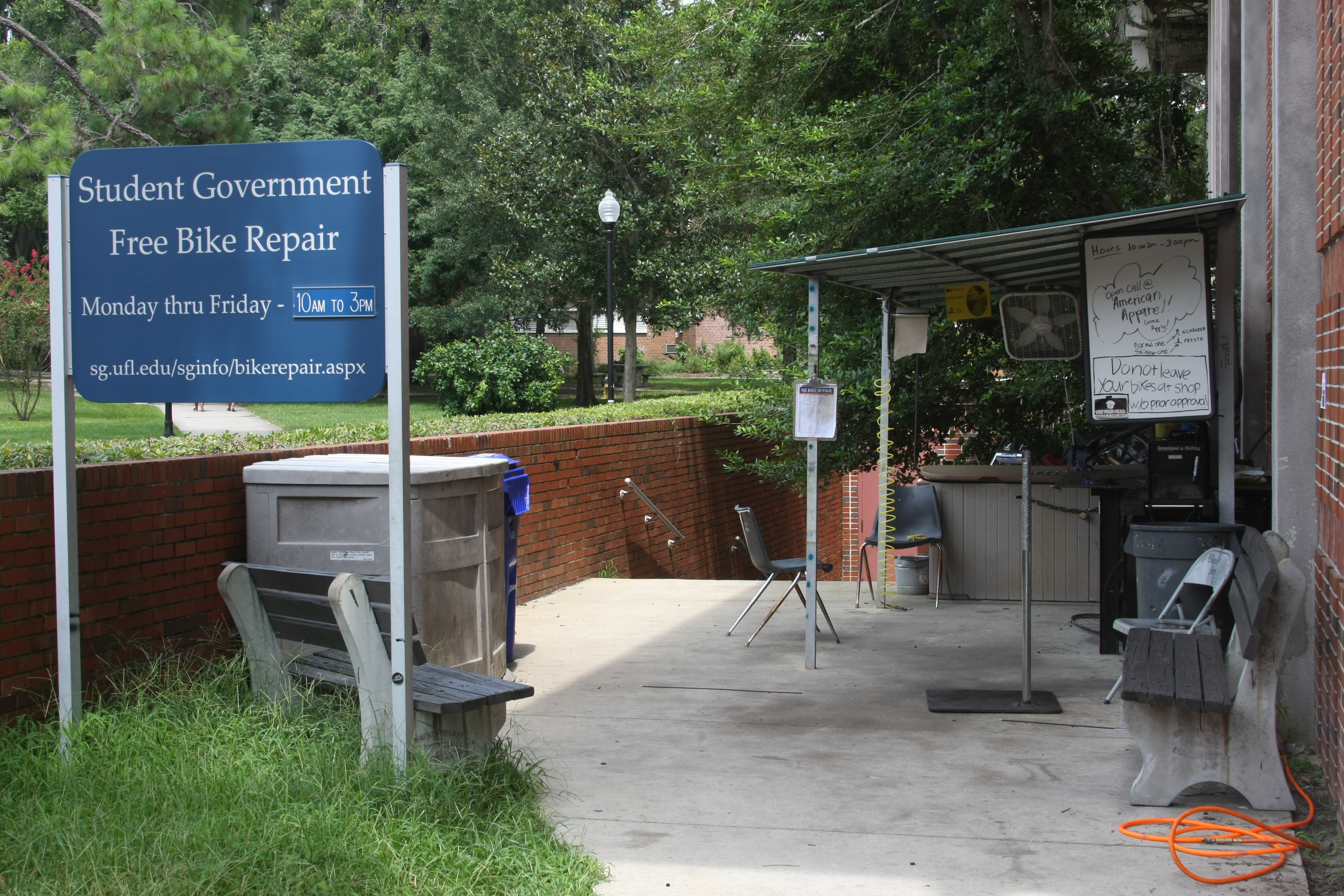
Former Student Government sponsored bicycle repair facility at the Reitz Union

- Reitz Union Hotel Reception (Rooms located on Levels 5 and 6)
- Senate Chambers
- Gator Market
- Subway
- SG Bike Repair
- Game Room, including bowling alley and pool tables;
- Gator Esports Center
- Reitz Union Barbershop (barbershop)

=== Level 1 ===
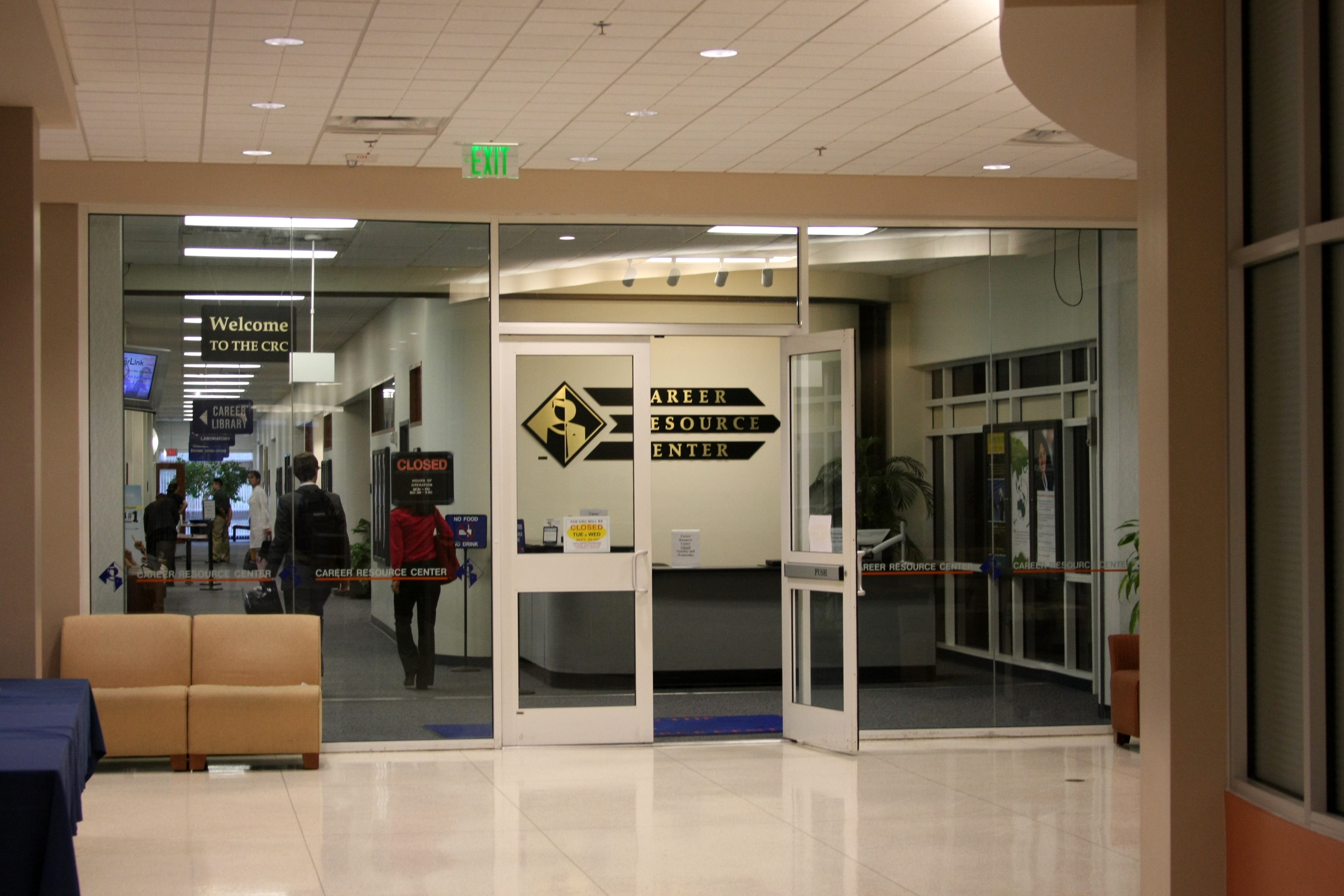
Career Connections Center

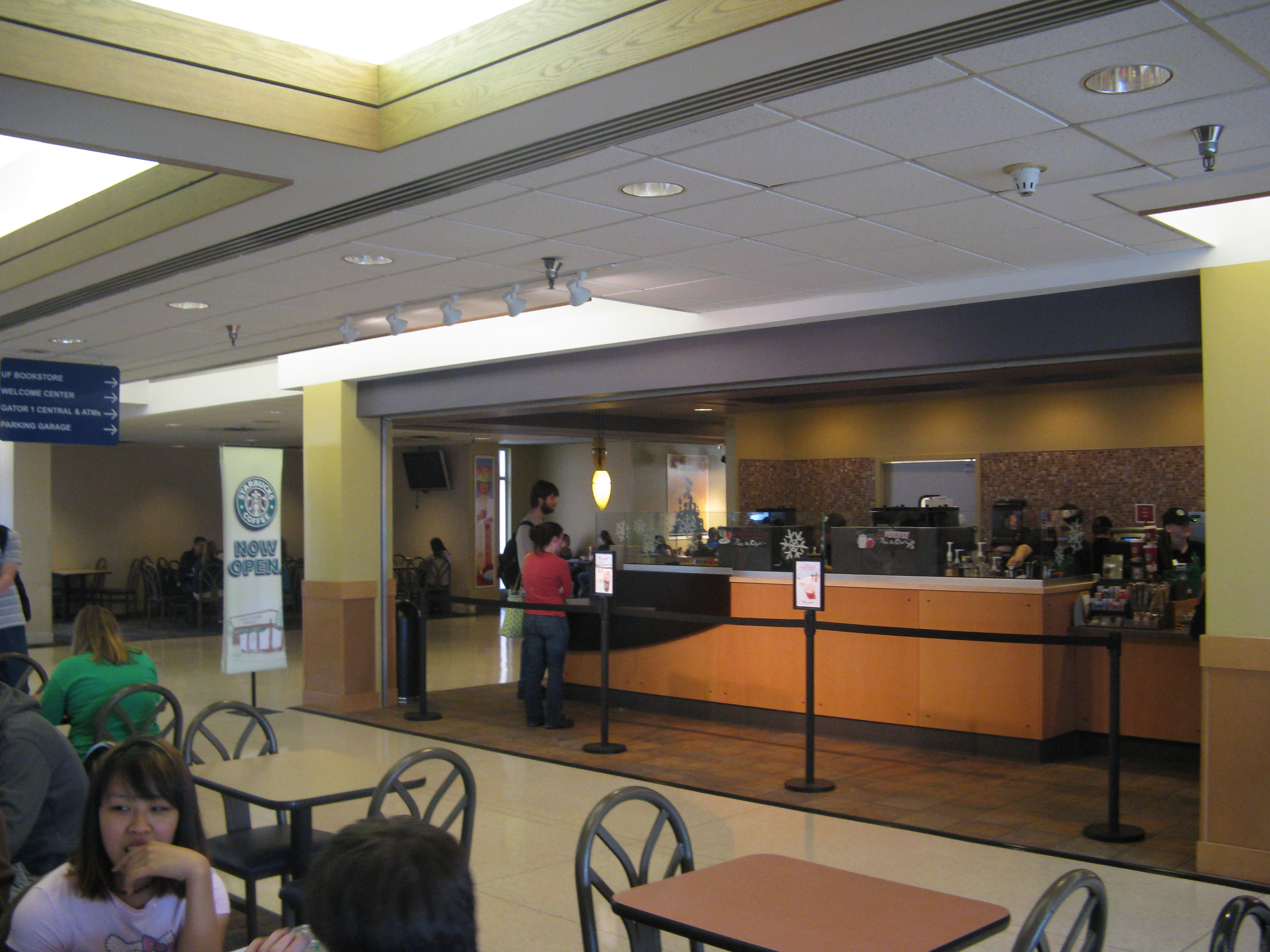
Starbucks in the food court

- University Bookstore
- Information Desk
- Indoor food court, including Starbucks and Panda Express
- Career Connections Center
- Study Lounges
- Administrative Offices
- Palm and Pine Catering Office
- Event Services Office
- GatorWell Health Promotion Services

=== Level 2 ===
- Grand Ballroom
- Meeting Rooms
- Reitz Union Auditorium often used as a movie theater
- The Gallery
- The David and Wanda Brown Center for Leadership and Service
- Multicultural and Diversity Affairs

=== Level 3 ===
- Student Government offices
- Reitz Programming Board (RPB)
- Department of Student Activities and Involvement
- Reitz Union Programs
- Rion Ballroom
- GatorNights
- Student Legal Services (including notary services)
- Sorority and Fraternity Affairs (part of the Student Activities and Involvement dealing with fraternities and sororities)
- Meeting Rooms

=== Level 4 ===
- Arredondo Cafe (formerly the Arredondo Room and Micanopy Room)
- Matthews Suite

=== Level 5 and 6 ===
- Reitz Union Hotel Guest Rooms (Hotel Front Desk on Ground Level)

== See also ==
- History of the University of Florida
- List of University of Florida buildings
