= The Oaks Mall =

Enclosed shopping center in Gainesville, Florida

Coordinates: 29.65957°N 82.41113°W

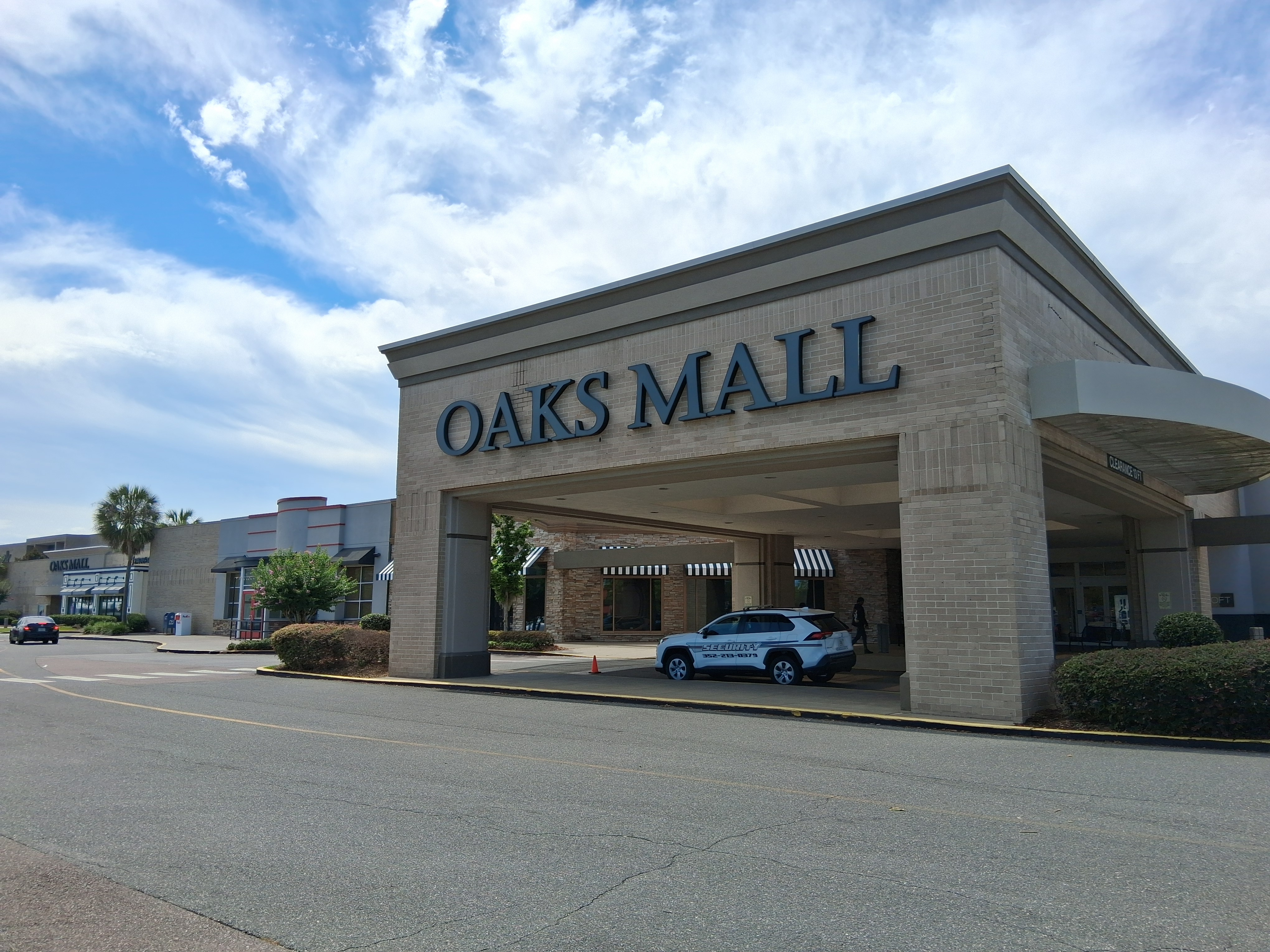
- The mall's main entrance
- Location: Gainesville, Florida
- Address: 6419 W. Newberry Road
- Opened: February 1978; 48 years ago
- Developer: Alan Squitieri & David Hocker
- Manager: Spinoso Real Estate Group
- Owner: Spinoso Real Estate Group
- Num. of stores: 119
- Num. of anchor tenants: 5
- Floor area: 906,104 sq ft (84,179.8 m^{2})
- Floors: 1 (2 in Belk and both Dillard's locations)
- Website: theoaksmall.com

The Oaks Mall is an enclosed shopping center in Gainesville, Florida. It was announced in 1974, opened in 1978, and underwent a major renovation process in 2002.

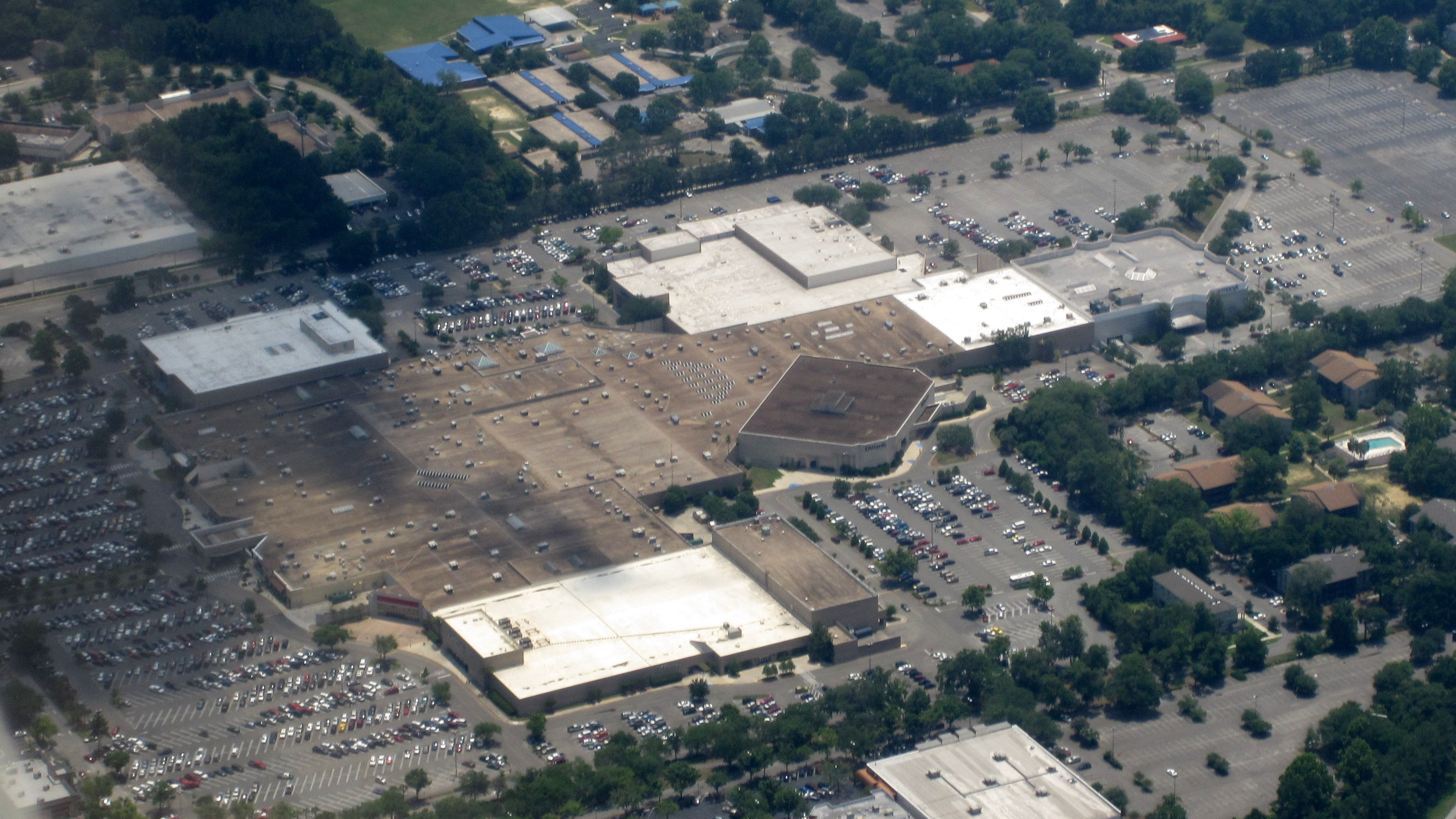
An aerial view of the mall in 2010

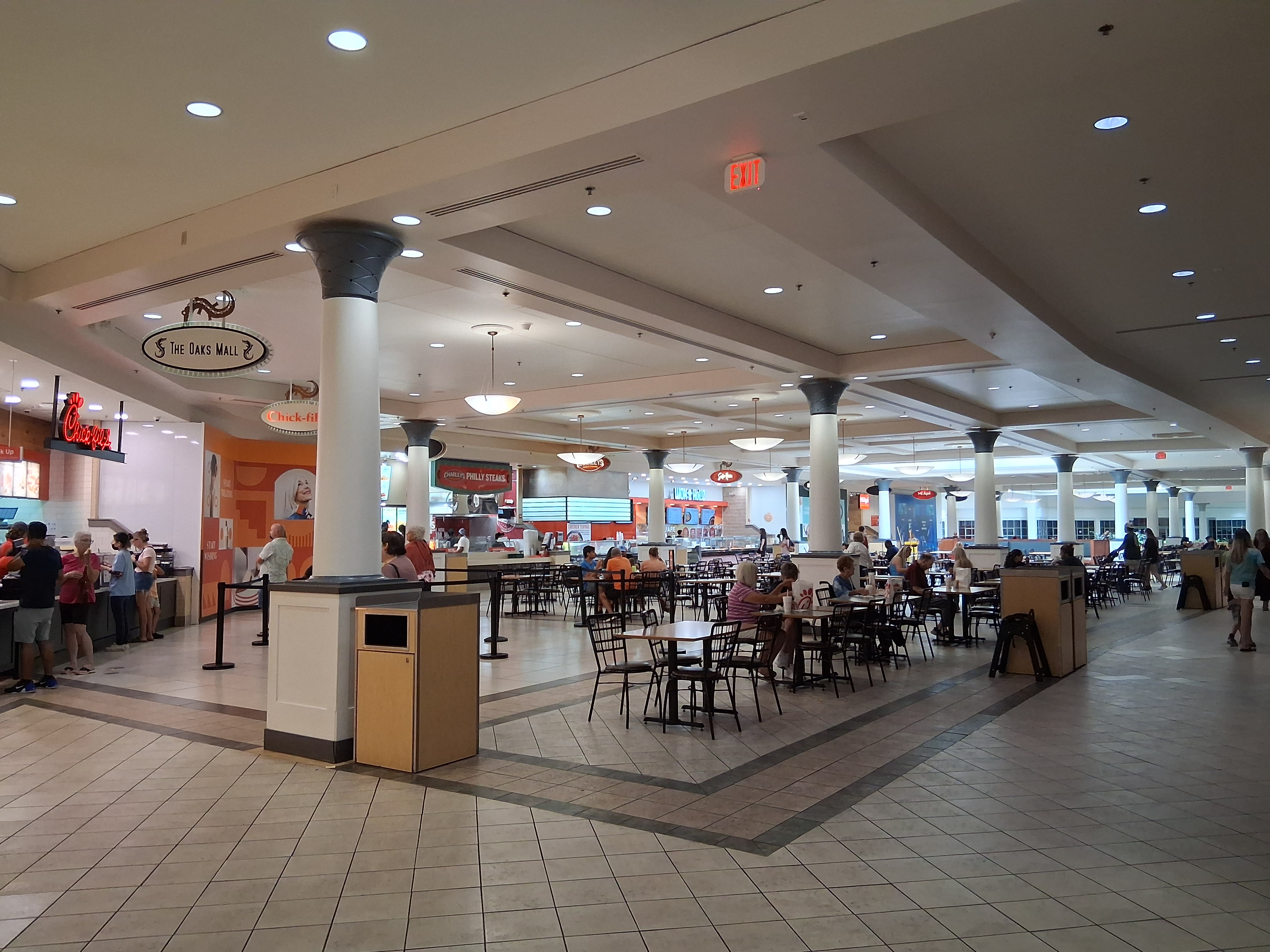
The mall's food court, which was renovated in 2002

The mall's interior is one floor, but three of its anchor stores have two floors. Its anchor stores include Belk, two Dillard's stores, JCPenney, and the University of Florida Health.

== Operations ==
The mall serves a large trade area stretching into 11 counties with a population growth rate nearly double the national average. The center also benefits from its close proximity to over 64,000 students attending the nearby University of Florida and Santa Fe College.

=== Recurring events ===
The mall opens early every Black Friday, with some of its stores attracting dozens of early shoppers who wait in line. Shortly before Christmas, it hosts a mall Santa photography event for children.

A small carnival with various rides takes place once a year in the mall's parking lot.

== History ==
=== Construction and opening ===
The mall was announced in 1974 with JCPenney and Belk-Lindsey (both are still there today) being the first major tenants to lease space. The Oaks Mall was the second major indoor mall in Gainesville after the Gainesville Mall, which was located at US 441 and NW 23rd Avenue and operated from 1969 to 1993.

The Oaks Mall opened in February 1978. Burdines, Sears, and Ivey's all opened in 1983 as part of the second and third stages. Sears relocated from the Gainesville Mall.

=== Renovations ===
In 2002, the Oaks Mall underwent a major six-month expansion. The renovations raised the food court's size to 18,000 square feet, increased the number of restaurants, and expanded its dining area to include 650 seats with dedicated tables for children and disabled people. The renovations also converted the mall's former AMC movie theater into several retail spaces, replaced its small indoor amphitheatre with a children's play area, and improved the restrooms.

In 2017, LED bulbs and solar panels were installed to improve the mall's energy efficiency.

=== Anchor store closings and UF Health lease ===
In 2015, Sears Holdings spun off 235 of its properties, including the Sears at The Oaks Mall, into Seritage Growth Properties.

In 2017, 96% of the mall's retail spaces were occupied, including all five of its anchor store spaces.

On January 4, 2018, Macy's announced it would be closing its location at the mall as part of a plan to close 11 stores nationwide. A liquidation sale began on January 8 and lasted until March 2018. Dillard's announced plans to expand into the former Macy's space while retaining its existing anchor location (former Ivey's) at the mall in order to offer a wider range of merchandise and opened in November 2018.

On April 20, 2018, it was announced that Sears will close its store as part of a plan to close 42 stores nationwide. The store closed in July 2018.

In June 2018, UF Health announced plans for a 20 year lease and renovation of the space to contain its ophthalmology and otolaryngology departments. The clinics had their grand opening on January 25, 2020.

=== Property split and foreclosure complaint ===
In March 2023, Brookfield Properties sold off nearly 8 acres of the mall's southern land, which had previously been used as an overflow parking lot, for $3.8 million.

In February 2025, U.S. Bank filed a foreclosure complaint, claiming that the Oaks Mall LLC defaulted on more than $78 million of their $118.3 million loan that they borrowed from German American Capital Corp in September 2012. U.S. Bank asked the court to appoint a third-party receiver to take control of the mall. In March 2025, Spinoso Real Estate Group DLS, LLC was chosen by a magistrate to take control of the mall, including having the authority to terminate any current employees.
