= Guamanian citizenship and nationality =

Guam is an island in the Marianas archipelago of the Northern Pacific located between Japan and New Guinea on a north–south axis and Hawaii and the Philippines on an east–west axis. It is an unincorporated territory of the United States. Its inhabitants were Spanish nationals from 1521 until the Spanish–American War of 1898, from which point they derived their nationality from United States law. Nationality is the legal means in which inhabitants acquire formal membership in a nation without regard to its governance type. In addition to being United States nationals, people born in Guam are both citizens of the United States and citizens of Guam. Citizenship is the relationship between the government and the governed, the rights and obligations that each owes the other, once one has become a member of a nation. Though the Constitution of the United States recognizes both national and state citizenship as a means of accessing rights, (Note: The Constitution of the United States establishes that rights flow from both national and state citizenship, as does the Guam Organic Act of 1950 for Guamanians. Because, federal law, including treaties, overrides other laws within its territorial limits only if those laws are incompatible with national statutes, states historically have had the ability to grant or withhold rights for various categories of persons residing in their jurisdiction without abridging the Equal Protection Clause. Until the 1960s, differences in legislation among various jurisdictions gave people extremely different civil rights depending upon where they resided.) Guam's history as a territory has created both confusion over the status of its nationals and citizenship and controversy because of distinctions between jurisdictions of the United States.

== Spanish period (1521–1898) ==
Portuguese navigator Ferdinand Magellan, during his fleet's circumnavigation of the globe for Charles I, King of Spain, sighted the island on March 6, 1521. On January 26, 1565, Miguel López de Legazpi officially claimed the island for Spain. From that date the Laws of the Indies were implemented in Guam and the inhabitants became subjects of the Spanish crown, under the authority of the Viceroyalty of New Spain, in Mexico. Administration on behalf of the king was granted to the Council of the Indies, which served as the authority on commercial, ecclesiastical, financial, legal and military matters in the Spanish possessions. No European settlement occurred at that time and the island was only visited from time to time by Dutch, English and Spanish explorers and pirates. It was not until 1668, with the arrival of missionary Diego Luis de San Vitores, that Spanish colonization began. In 1681, a royal decree granted the indigenous population, the Chamorro people, equal status with other Spanish subjects in its possessions. In general, this meant that criollos, persons with Spanish heritage born in the colonies, had fewer rights than peninsulares, those born in Spain, but more rights than indigenous people or slaves.

In 1808 when Charles IV of Spain was dethroned by an attempted coup d'état during the Peninsular War with France, the government-in-exile promulgated Spain's first constitution. The 1812 Constitution of Cádiz limited the power of the king and granted freedoms and rights to the Spanish people. Under its terms, the Spanish nation included all free men and their children born and settled in the territories of the Spanish empire. Freedmen from Africa and foreigners residing within Spanish territory were permitted to naturalize as Spanish. In 1814 upon returning to Spain from captivity in France, Ferdinand VII abrogated the constitution and reinstated an absolute monarchy, leading to independence wars throughout Spanish America. Revolution in 1820 reinstated the Constitution of Cádiz, but the return to power of Ferdinand in 1823, saw it suspended again. In 1824 the control of Guam and the other Mariana Islands was moved from Mexico to the Philippines and in 1828 a new organic law was devised for the territory. Though it was intended to divide royal estates and encourage commerce, in effect, it strengthened the government monopoly on trade. A succession of Spanish governors attempted to improve the economy with limited success in Guam.

Instability in the Spanish empire continued until 1874 with periods of conflict followed by calm only to erupt into insurrection again. The Constitution of Cádiz was reinstated in 1836 and revoked a year later. Two Carlist Wars followed by the 1868 Revolution, led to a democratic experiment and the drafting of a new constitution in 1869. The constitution called for significant colonial reforms, but before they could be acted upon the Third Carlist War and subsequent restoration of the monarchy ended its authority. A new constitution was adopted in 1876, and in 1889 the first Spanish Civil Code was adopted. The Code was extended to Puerto Rico, Panama, the Philippines and Guam, establishing that nationality was acquired either from birth in Spanish territory or by descent from a Spanish national. Legitimate children could derive nationality from a father, but only illegitimate children could derive Spanish nationality from a mother, as a married woman was required to take the nationality of her husband. It also contained provisions for foreigners to naturalize.

In 1895, the Cuban War of Independence began and a spate of sensational articles in the press in the United States urged US intervention against Spain. Senator Henry Cabot Lodge, US Navy captain Alfred Thayer Mahan, and Assistant Secretary of the Navy Theodore Roosevelt encouraged US involvement as a means of securing strategical posts in both oceans on either side of the proposed Panama Canal project. Presidents Grover Cleveland and William McKinley were able to avoid action other than mediation until 1898, when the battleship USS Maine exploded and sank in Havana Harbor on Feb 15 1898. As a result, the US entered the conflict and the Spanish–American War ensued with the US delearing war on April 25. Battles in both the Caribbean and Pacific resulted in destruction of the Spanish fleet and loss of its overseas possessions. On June 21, 1898, the Spanish governor Juan Marina surrendered Guam to the US forces and under the terms of the Treaty of Paris signed in December, Spain relinquished sovereignty over Cuba and ceded Guam, the Philippines, and Puerto Rico to the United States.

== United States period (1898–present) ==
=== Establishing nationality for Guam (1898–1952) ===
Prior to signing the Treaty of Paris, all persons born in US possessions had been collectively naturalized upon acquisition by the United States. Under the terms of the 1898 Treaty, however, possessions were deemed to be foreign localities and because no collective naturalization was provided, persons living therein were not protected by to the Citizenship Clause of the Fourteenth Amendment to the United States Constitution. The language created a new classification of non-citizen US nationals, which applied at the time to Cuba, Guam, the Philippines, and Puerto Rico, and was later extended to include American Samoa, Guam, and the Virgin Islands. In essence, until Congress chose to convey rights of citizenship, inhabitants of possessions were not extended full constitutional rights, but belonged to the United States. The lack of a collective naturalization clause created a situation which treated inhabitants differently based upon their origin. Spanish nationals born in Spain could opt to remain Spanish, by making a formal declaration that they wished to retain their original nationality before authorities within one year of the treaty. Failure to do so, severed the tie to Spain if the person remained in Guam. Foreigners remained foreign nationals. The United States Department of Justice determined that as of April 11, 1899 inhabitants of Guam became noncitizen US nationals. Persons born in Guam since that date to a father with US nationality derived nationality from the father. (Note: The Department of Justice incorrectly gives the effective date and Spanish succession as April 11, 1898; however, the Treaty of Paris shows the territory was ceded on December 10, 1898 and ratified by Congress on the effective date of April 11, 1899.)

In 1899, the administration of Guam was placed under the United States Navy. The entire island was designated as a naval base, with the island's governor appointed by the Secretary of the Navy. Because the governor also served as the commandant of the naval station, affairs of state were often subordinated to maintenance and development of the station. Under the terms of the Naturalization Act of 1906 (34 Stat. 596, USC title 8, sec. 357–358) territorial noncitizen nationals were allowed to naturalize as US citizens; however, the statute required a court with a seal, clerk, and jurisdiction to process applications. As Congress had not created such a court for Guam, Guamanians had no access to naturalization. Until 1917, the governor had sole control of the island's administration and appointed naval officers to run the various departments of government. The first Congress in Guam was called in 1917. Membership in the congress was determined by government appointment and the thirty-four members were chosen from among those that were considered leaders on the island. Their task was to advise the Governor regarding improving conditions and providing for the welfare of Guamanians. They had no legislative authority, but rather advised the Governor on a wide number of topics. In 1940 under the terms of the consolidated Nationality Act, Section 204 (a and b) persons born on or after January 13, 1941, in an outlying possession of the United States became US nationals if one parent was also a US national. Persons born outside the United States or a possession on or after that date became US nationals if both parents were US nationals. It did not provide a specific section on Guam, thus it limited those who could apply for naturalization from Guam to persons who were not required to establish residency in the United States.

Immediately after World War II ended, residents of Guam reopened the issue of US citizenship and for the first time found support from influential citizens, the Institute of Ethnic Affairs, The New York Times and the US Navy and Interior Departments. In 1949, President Truman approved that administration over the island should pass from the Navy to the Department of the Interior. After conducting official studies on the issue, in 1950 an Organic Act was passed by the US Congress granting federal citizenship to Guam, as well as providing for internal self-government and for the establishment of a civilian administration. The Act established that all persons who were inhabitants of Guam and nationals of Spain on April 11, 1899; all persons born on the island who lived there on April 11, 1899; and anyone born on the island after April 11, 1899, were citizens and nationals of the United States if they had continued to reside in Guam or within the territory under the sovereign jurisdiction of the federal government of the United States and not sought out foreign nationality. In 1952, the Immigration and Naturalization Office was first established in Guam and that year the Immigration and Nationality Act, the foundation of the current statutes on US nationality, included provisions for Guam for the first time, confirming that they were nationals and citizens from birth.

=== Establishing citizenship for Guam (1925–1968) ===
In 1925, the Guam Congress first requested that the inhabitants receive US citizenship, but the request did not bear fruit. In 1929, Willis W. Bradley, Jr. was appointed governor and issued a proclamation in 1930 granting Guamanian citizenship to all inhabitants of the territory born or naturalized in it; all inhabitants who were residing in Guam on February 1, 1899, who had no allegiance to a foreign power except Spain; any woman who was naturalized in the United States prior to September 22, 1922, and was married to a native of Guam; (Note: September 22, 1922 refers to the date the Cable Act was signed into law. This statute repealed requirements for married women to automatically acquire the nationality of their spouse. As long as her husband was not part of a group restricted from becoming a US national, women could retain their nationality upon marriage. Immigration appeals later confirmed that women who were noncitizen nationals did not lose their nationality after 1922 upon marriage to foreign men, even if the husband was an excluded class, because the Cable Act, expressly stated that women citizens who married ineligible foreigners lost their nationality. As Guamanians women were non-citizen nationals, the law was inapplicable.) children born abroad to a Guamanian father who had resided in Guam previously; and minor children of naturalized Guamanians if the child resided in Guam within two years of the father's naturalization. Per the review of the US Department of Justice, citizenship in Guam was only applicable on the island of Guam, as the US government had not confirmed any status upon Guamanians except noncitizen nationals. Willis then dissolved the Congress and held the first elections on the island in 1931 to elect delegates to the Second Guam Congress. Though elected, members were still an advisory body rather and legislators. Desiring US citizenship in 1933, almost 2,000 Guamanian leaders signed and sent a petition to President Franklin D. Roosevelt. On the basis of the petition, a bill was introduced in the United States Senate, it died in committee. In 1936, the Guam Congress, passed a resolution to petition the US Congress to grant federal citizenship to Guamanians. Though the issue was debated by the US Senate, a proposed bill failed in 1937.

During the Japanese occupation of Guam the local Congress was unable to meet, but resumed sessions in 1946. Around the same time, the US Congress began deliberation to end the naval administration of the island. Administration passed from the Navy to the Department of the Interior on July 1, 1950, and on August 1, 1950, the Organic Act of Guam was signed into law. The Organic Act did not require persons born in Guam to become US citizens, but had provisions that within two years, foreigners were required to declare that they wished to retain their original nationality. Under the terms of the act, United States law was not automatically extended to Guam, but rather at the discretion of the US Congress. In essence, it solidified the interpretations of the Insular Cases, a series of decisions by the US Supreme Court, that Guamanians were entitled to statutory, but not constitutional citizenship.

One of the first acts of the Eleventh Guam Congress was changing the name of the body to the Legislature of Guam. The legislature then undertook a review of the existing codes of Guam and codified them, enacting in 1954, a new civil code, code of civil procedure, penal code and probate code. That year, Guam also passed a statute unique among the territories and which had only previously been implemented in the state of Georgia, extending universal suffrage to citizens eighteen and older. They also implemented for the first time trial by jury, which activists had been pressing for since the 1930s. In 1968, the provisions of the Fifteenth and Nineteenth Amendments prohibiting discrimination in voting practices were extended to Guam. That year, the Organic Act was amended to allow Guamanians to elect their governor and lieutenant governor, rather than those offices being held by Interior Department appointees.

== Current system ==
=== Nationality acquisition and federal citizenship ===
By virtue of the various laws passed concerning Guamanian nationality and citizenship, Guamanians acquire nationality and federal citizenship by various means. These include by birth in Guam on or after April 11, 1899; under the terms of the Organic Act, as it has been amended over time; or under provisions of the Nationality Act of 1940 or 1952 through a parent who was Guamanian and held federal nationality. Likewise, federal statutory citizenship has been acquired through the Organic Act of Guam and its various amendments through time. Despite possessing federal statutory citizenship, residents of Guam have no representation in the US Congress, are unable to vote in the Electoral College, and do not have full protection under the US Constitution, unless they come to reside in a U.S. state. Since 1972, Guam has been able to send a non-voting delegate to the US House of Representatives. Likewise, US citizens who live in Guam lose the right to vote in federal elections, as the Uniformed and Overseas Citizens Absentee Voting Act applies only to citizens who live outside the jurisdiction of the United States. Though all residents of Guam pay federal taxes in a required mirroring scheme implemented by the Internal Revenue Service, there is less federal assistance available to island citizens through programs like Temporary Assistance for Needy Families, Medicaid, and Supplemental Security Income.

=== Domestic citizenship ===
From 1930 with Governor Bradley's proclamation, domestic Guamanian citizenship had been defined and since 1954 local statues had been codified and universal suffrage implemented. Between 1969 and 1970, a constitutional convention led to the first attempt by Guamanians to redefine their relationship with the federal government and acquire more control over its autonomy. Though the first Constitution was rejected because it attempted to amend the Organic Act, defeat led to the establishment of the Guam Political Status Commission in 1971. The commission began negotiations with the US Congress and in 1975 gained approval to draft a constitution. In 1976, following a public referendum, a domestic bill was approved to call a second constitutional convention. Drafting began in 1977, but the proposed constitution was rejected by voters in 1979. Further consultations with the public were held in 1980 and 1982, with the results that Guam should seek commonwealth status, as opposed to statehood or complete independence. From 1982 to the early 2000s, legislators attempted to gain approval for the Guam Commonwealth Act, but were unable to reach compromises which satisfied both Guamanians and federal authorities. At the end of 2019, Guam was still being governed under the organic act and had not achieved commonwealth status.

== See also ==
- Demographics of Guam
