= Voting in Guam =

Voting rights of citizens in Guam differ from those of United States citizens in each of the fifty states and in Washington, D.C. In the U.S. House of Representatives, Guam is entitled to a delegate, who is not allowed to vote on the floor of the House but can vote on procedural matters and in House committees. Citizens of Guam may not vote in general elections for president.

The United States Constitution grants congressional voting representation to the states and Washington, D.C., of which Guam is not one. Guam is a federal territory ultimately under the complete authority of Congress. The lack of voting representation in Congress for residents of Guam has been an issue since the foundation of the federal district.

The Uniformed and Overseas Citizens Absentee Voting Act (UOCAVA) is a United States federal law dealing with elections and voting rights for United States citizens residing overseas. The act requires that all U.S. states, the District of Columbia, Puerto Rico, Guam, American Samoa, and the U.S. Virgin Islands allow certain U.S. citizens to register to vote and to vote by absentee ballot in federal elections. The act is Public Law 99-410 and was signed into law by President Ronald Reagan on August 28, 1986.

== U.S. citizenship ==
Guam is an unincorporated United States territory. The Immigration and Nationality Act of 1952 expanded the definition of the "United States" for nationality purposes to include Guam, therefore those born on Guam are "U.S. [citizens] at birth on the same terms as persons born in other parts of the United States." If a U.S. citizen born on Guam were to move to a state or the District of Columbia, they would be able to participate in presidential, and other elections that most other U.S. citizens can participate in.

== History ==
On August 1, 1950, President Truman signed into law the Guam Organic Act of 1950, which gave the Chamorro people certain rights and protections under the U.S. Constitution. The people of Guam were afforded the opportunity to set and administer policy and laws for the island of Guam. In the 1980s and early 1990s, there was a significant movement in favor of the territory becoming a commonwealth, which would give it a level of self-government similar to Puerto Rico and the Northern Mariana Islands. However, the federal government rejected the version of a commonwealth that the government of Guam proposed, due to it having clauses incompatible with the Territorial Clause (Art. IV, Sec. 3, cl. 2) of the U.S. Constitution. Other movements are also in existence that advocate becoming a U.S. state, union with the state of Hawaii, union with the Northern Mariana Islands as a single territory, or independence.

== Guam's government ==
Guam is governed by a popularly elected governor and a unicameral 15-member legislature, whose members are known as senators. Guam elects one non-voting delegate, currently James Moylan, to the United States House of Representatives. U.S. citizens in Guam vote in a presidential straw poll for their choice in the U.S. Presidential general election, but since Guam has no votes in the Electoral College, the poll has no real effect. However, in sending delegates to the Republican and Democratic national conventions, Guam does have influence in the national presidential race, though these convention delegates are elected by local party conventions rather than voters in primaries.

== Opposition ==
Activists, such as Siobhon McManus, have been outspoken about the fact that citizens of Guam do not have full voting rights in United States elections.
