= Guam =

U.S. territory in Micronesia

Coordinates: 13°30′N 144°48′E

Guam Guåhan (Chamorro)
- Unincorporated and organized U.S. territory
- Flag Seal
- Nickname(s): Tånó y Chamoru (Chamorro) (English: "Land of the Chamorro")
- Motto: Tånó I' Man Chamoru (Chamorro) (English: "Land of the Chamorros")
- Anthem: Kantikun Guåhan ("Guam Hymn") (regional) "The Star-Spangled Banner" (official)
- Location of Guam (circled in red)
- Sovereign state: United States
- Before annexation: Spanish East Indies
- Cession from Spain: December 10, 1898
- Capital: Hagåtña
- Largest city: Dededo
- Official languages: English; Chamorro
- Ethnic groups (2010): 49.3% Pacific Islander; 36.6% Asian; 9.4% Multiracial; 7.1% White; 0.6% Other
- Religion (2010): 94.1% Christianity; 1.7% No religion; 1.5% Folk religions; 1.1% Buddhism; 1.6% Other
- Demonym(s): Guamanian
- Government: Devolved presidential dependency within a federal republic
  - President: Donald Trump (R)
  - Governor: Lou Leon Guerrero (D)
  - Lieutenant Governor: Josh Tenorio (D)
- Legislature: Legislature of Guam

United States Congress
  - House delegate: James Moylan (R)

Area
  - Total: 210 sq mi (540 km^{2})
- Highest elevation: 1,335 ft (407 m)

Population
  - 2021 estimate: 168,801 (177th)
  - Density: 299/km^{2} (774.4/sq mi)
- GDP (PPP): 2016 estimate
  - Total: $5.8 billion
  - Per capita: $35,600
- GDP (nominal): 2022 estimate
  - Total: $6.9 billion
  - Per capita: $41,833
- HDI (2017): ▲0.901 very high
- Currency: United States dollar (US$) (USD)
- Time zone: UTC+10:00 (ChST)
- Date format: mm/dd/yyyy
- Driving side: Right
- Calling code: +1-671
- USPS abbreviation: GU
- ISO 3166 code: GU; US-GU
- Internet TLD: .gu

Guam (/ɡwɑːm/ GWAHM; Chamorro: Guåhan [ˈɡʷɑhɑn]) is an organized, unincorporated territory of the United States in the Micronesia subregion of Oceania, in the western Pacific Ocean. Guam's capital is Hagåtña, and the most populous village is Dededo. It is the westernmost point and territory of the United States, reckoned from the geographic center of the U.S. In Oceania, Guam is the largest and southernmost of the Mariana Islands and the largest island in Micronesia. As of September 2026, its population was 170,476. Chamorros are its largest ethnic group, but a minority on the multiethnic island. The territory spans 210 square miles (540 km^{2}; 130,000 acres) and has a population density of 775 per square mile (299/km^{2}).

Indigenous Guamanians are the Chamorro, who are related to the Austronesian peoples of the Malay Archipelago, the Philippines, Taiwan, and Polynesia. But unlike most of its neighbors, the Chamorro language is not classified as a Micronesian or Polynesian language. Rather, like Palauan, it possibly constitutes an independent branch of the Malayo-Polynesian language family. The Chamorro people settled Guam and the Mariana Islands approximately 3,500 years ago. Portuguese explorer Ferdinand Magellan, while in the service of Spain, was the first European to visit and claim the island on March 6, 1521. Guam was fully colonized by Spain in 1668. Between the 17th and 19th centuries, Guam was an important stopover for Spanish Manila galleons. During the Spanish–American War, the United States captured Guam on June 21, 1898. Under the 1898 Treaty of Paris, Spain ceded Guam to the U.S. effective April 11, 1899.

Before World War II, Guam was one of five American jurisdictions in the Pacific Ocean, along with Wake Island in Micronesia, American Samoa and Hawaii in Polynesia, and the Philippines. On December 8, 1941, hours after the attack on Pearl Harbor, Guam was captured by the Japanese, who occupied the island for two and a half years before American forces recaptured it on July 21, 1944, which is commemorated there as Liberation Day. Since the 1960s, Guam's economy has been supported primarily by tourism and the U.S. military, for which Guam is a major strategic asset. Its future political status has been a matter of significant discussion, with public opinion polls indicating a strong preference for American statehood.

Guam's de facto motto is "Where America's Day Begins", which refers to the island's proximity to the International Date Line. Guam is among the 17 non-self-governing territories listed by the United Nations, and has been a member of the Pacific Community since 1983.

Guam is called Guåhan by Chamorro speakers, from the word guaha, meaning 'to have'; its English gloss 'we have' references the island's providing everything needed to live.

== History ==
=== Pre-Contact era ===
A map showing the Neolithic Austronesian migrations into the islands of the Indo-Pacific

Guam, along with the other Mariana Islands, were the first islands settled by humans in Remote Oceania. It was also the first and the longest of the ocean-crossing voyages of the Austronesian peoples, and is separate from the later Polynesian settlement of the rest of Remote Oceania. They were first settled around 1500 to 1400 BC, by migrants departing from the Philippines which was followed by a second migration from the Caroline Islands in the first millennium AD. A third migration wave took place from Island Southeast Asia, likely the Philippines or eastern Indonesia, by 900 AD.

These original settlers of Guam and the Northern Mariana Islands evolved into the Chamorro people, historically known as Chamorros after first contact with the Spaniards. The ancient Chamorro society had four classes: chamorri (chiefs), matua (upper class), achaot (middle class), and mana'chang (lower class). The matua were located in the coastal villages, which meant they had the best access to fishing grounds. The mana'chang were located in the island's interior. Matua and mana'chang rarely communicated with each other. The matua often used achaot as intermediaries.

There were also "makåhna" or "kakahna", shamans with magical powers and "'suruhånu" or "suruhåna", healers who used different kinds of plants and natural materials to make medicine. Belief in spirits of ancient Chamorros called "Taotao mo'na" still persists as a remnant of pre-European culture. It is believed that "suruhånu" or "suruhåna" are the only ones who can safely harvest plants and other natural materials from their homes or "hålomtåno" without incurring the wrath of the "Taotao mo'na." Their society was organized along matrilineal clans.

The Chamorro people raised colonnades of megalithic capped pillars called latte stones upon which they built their homes. Latte stones are stone pillars that are found only in the Mariana Islands. They are a recent development in Pre-Contact Chamorro society. The latte-stone was used as a foundation on which thatched huts were built. Latte stones consist of a base shaped from limestone called the haligi and with a capstone, or tåsa, made either from a large brain coral or limestone, placed on top. A possible source for these stones, the Rota Latte Stone Quarry, was discovered in 1925 on Rota.

=== Spanish era ===
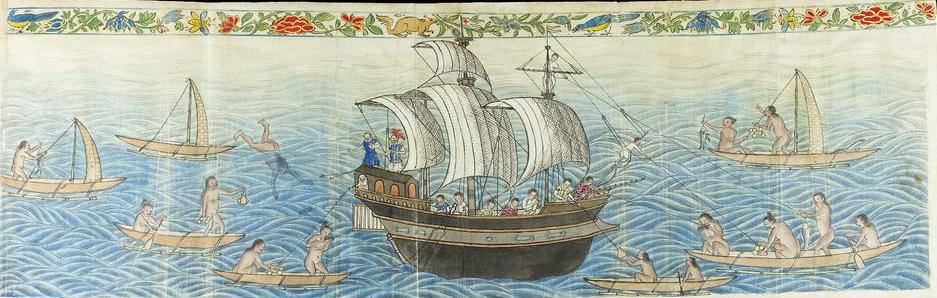
Reception of the Manila Galleon by the Chamorro in the Ladrones Islands, c. 1590 Boxer Codex

The first European to travel to Guam was Portuguese navigator Ferdinand Magellan, sailing for the King of Spain, when he sighted the island on March 6, 1521, during his fleet's circumnavigation of the globe. Despite Magellan's visit, Guam was not officially claimed by Spain until January 26, 1565, by Miguel López de Legazpi. From 1565 to 1815, Guam and the Northern Mariana Islands, the only Spanish outposts in the Pacific Ocean east of the Philippines, were reprovisioning stops for the Manila galleons, a fleet that covered the Pacific trade route between Acapulco and Manila.

Spanish colonization commenced on June 15, 1668, with the arrival of a mission led by Diego Luis de San Vitores, who established the first Catholic church. The islands were part of the Spanish East Indies, and part of the Viceroyalty of New Spain, based in Mexico City. The Spanish-Chamorro Wars on Guam began in 1670 over growing tensions with the Jesuit mission, with the last large-scale uprising in 1683.

Intermittent warfare, plus the typhoons of 1671 and 1693, and in particular the smallpox epidemic of 1688, reduced the Chamorro population from 50,000 to 10,000, and finally to less than 5,000. Up until the late 19th century, Guam was encountered by adventurers and pirates, including Thomas Cavendish, Olivier van Noort, John Eaton, William Dampier, Woodes Rogers, John Clipperton, George Shelvocke and William "Bully" Hayes.

The island became a rest stop for whalers starting in 1823. A devastating typhoon struck the island on August 10, 1848, followed by a severe earthquake on January 25, 1849, which resulted in many refugees from the Caroline Islands, victims of a resultant tsunami. This earthquake was much more powerful than the 8.2 one that occurred on August 8, 1993. After a smallpox epidemic killed 3,644 Guamanians in 1856, Carolinians and Japanese were permitted to settle in the Marianas.

The Marianas and specifically the island of Guam were a stopover for Spanish galleons en route from Acapulco, Mexico to Manila, Philippines in a convoy known as the Galeon de Manila. In the 1818 Spanish Census of the Spanish-Philippines, of which, the Marianas islands was under the governance of the Philippine Islands, it was recorded to have had 7,555 souls and of which there were 160 Spanish soldiers from Spain and Mexico, garrisoning the Marianas.

=== American era ===
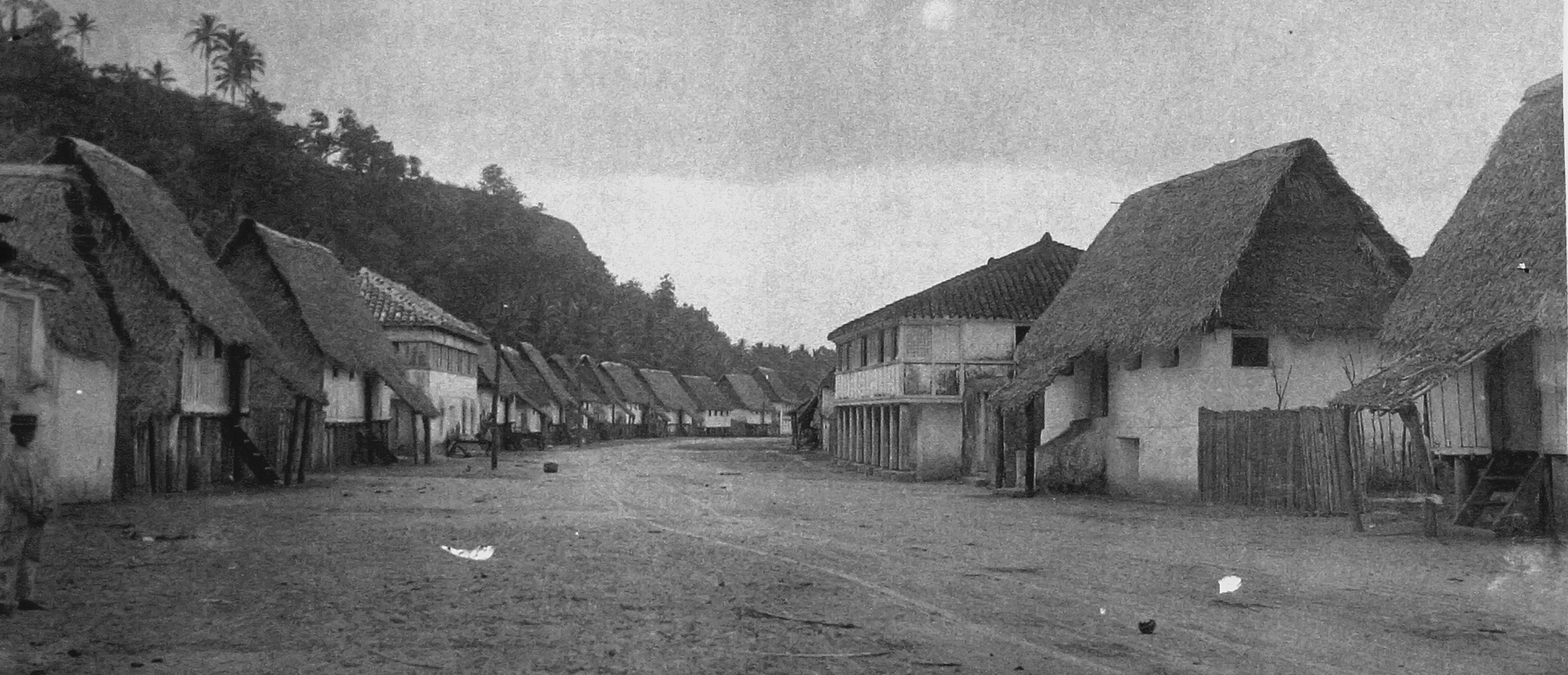
The main street of Hagåtña c. 1899–1900.

After almost four centuries as part of the Kingdom of Spain, the United States occupied the island following Spain's defeat in the 1898 Spanish–American War, as part of the Treaty of Paris of 1898. Guam was transferred to the United States Navy control on December 23, 1898, by Executive Order 108-A from 25th President William McKinley.

Guam was a station for American merchants and warships traveling to and from the Philippines, which was another American acquisition from Spain, while the Northern Mariana Islands were sold by Spain to Germany for part of its rapidly expanding German Empire. A U.S. Navy yard was established at Piti in 1899. A United States Marine Corps barracks was established at Sumay in 1901.

A marine seaplane unit was stationed in Sumay from 1921 to 1930, the first in the Pacific. The Commercial Pacific Cable Company built a telegraph/telephone station in 1903 for the first trans-Pacific communications cable, followed by Pan American World Airways establishing a seaplane base at Sumay for its trans-Pacific China Clipper route.

==== World War I ====
On December 10, 1914, the SMS Cormoran, a German armed merchant raider, was forced to seek port at Apra Harbor on the U.S. territory of Guam after running short on coal. The United States, which was neutral at the time, refused to supply provisions sufficient for the Cormoran to make a German port so the ship and her crew were interned until 1917.

On the morning of April 7, 1917, word reached Guam by telegraph cable that the U.S. Congress had declared war on Germany. The Naval Governor of Guam, Roy Campbell Smith, sent two officers to inform the Cormoran that a state of war existed between the two countries, that the crew were now prisoners of war, and that the ship must be surrendered. Meanwhile, the USS Supply blocked the entrance to Apra Harbor to prevent any attempt to flee. In a separate boat, the two officers were accompanied by a barge commanded by Lt. W.A. Hall, who was designated prize master, and had brought 18 sailors and 15 Marines from the barracks at Sumay.

Seeing a launch from Cormoran hauling a barge of supplies back shore, Hall ordered shots fired across the bow of the launch until it hove to. Meanwhile, the two officers reached Cormoran and informed Captain Adalbert Zuckschwerdt of the situation. Zuckschwerdt agreed to surrender his crew but refused to turn over the ship. The U.S. officers informed Zuckschwerdt that the Cormoran would be treated as an enemy combatant and left to inform Governor Smith of the situation. Unbeknownst to the Americans, the Germans had secreted an explosive device in the ship's coal bunker. Minutes after the Americans left, an explosion aboard Cormoran hurled debris across the harbor and her crew began abandoning ship. The two American boats and USS Supply immediately began to recover German sailors from the water, saving all but seven of the roughly 370 Cormoran crew. This incident, including the warning shots against the launch, accounted for the first violent action of the United States in World War I, first shots fired by the U.S. against Germany in World War I, the first German prisoners of war captured by the U.S., and the first Germans killed in action by the U.S. in World War I.

==== World War II ====
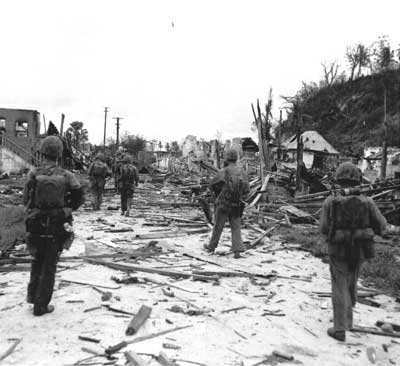
U.S. Marines walk through the ruins of Hagåtña, July 1944.

During World War II, the Empire of Japan attacked and invaded in the 1941 Battle of Guam on December 8, at the same time as the attack on Pearl Harbor. The Japanese renamed Guam Ōmiya-jima (Great Shrine Island). The Japanese occupation of Guam lasted about 31 months. During this period, the indigenous people of Guam were subjected to beatings, forced labor, family separation, concentration camps, massacres, beheadings and rape.

During the nearly three years of occupation approximately 1,100 Chamorros were killed, according to later US Congressional committee testimony in 2004. Some historians estimate that war violence killed 10% of Guam's then 20,000 population. The United States returned and fought the 1944 Battle of Guam from July 21 to August 10, to recapture the island. July 21 is now a territorial holiday, Liberation Day.

==== Post-war ====
After World War II, the Guam Organic Act of 1950 established Guam as an unincorporated organized territory of the United States, provided for the structure of the island's civilian government, and granted the people U.S. citizenship. The Governor of Guam was federally appointed until 1968 when the Guam Elective Governor Act provided for the office's popular election. Since Guam is not a U.S. state, U.S. citizens residing on Guam are not allowed to vote for president and their congressional representative is a non-voting member.

They do, however, vote for party delegates in presidential primaries. In 1969, a referendum on unification with the Northern Mariana Islands was held and rejected. During the 1970s, Maryly Van Leer Peck started an engineering program, expanded University of Guam, and founded Guam Community College. In the same period, Alby Mangels, Australian adventurer and filmmaker of World Safari visited Guam during his six-year escapade on the leg of his voyage through the Pacific aboard the Klaraborg.

The removal of Guam's security clearance by President John F. Kennedy in 1963 allowed for the development of a tourism industry. When the United States closed U.S. Naval Base Subic Bay and Clark Air Base bases in the Philippines after the expiration of their leases in the early 1990s, many of the forces stationed there were relocated to Guam.

The 1997 Asian financial crisis, which hit Japan particularly hard, severely affected Guam's tourism industry. Military cutbacks in the 1990s also disrupted the island's economy. Economic recovery was further hampered by devastation from super typhoons Paka in 1997 and Pongsona in 2002, as well as the effects of the September 11 terrorist attacks and the crash of Korean Air Flight 801 on tourism.

== Geography and environment ==
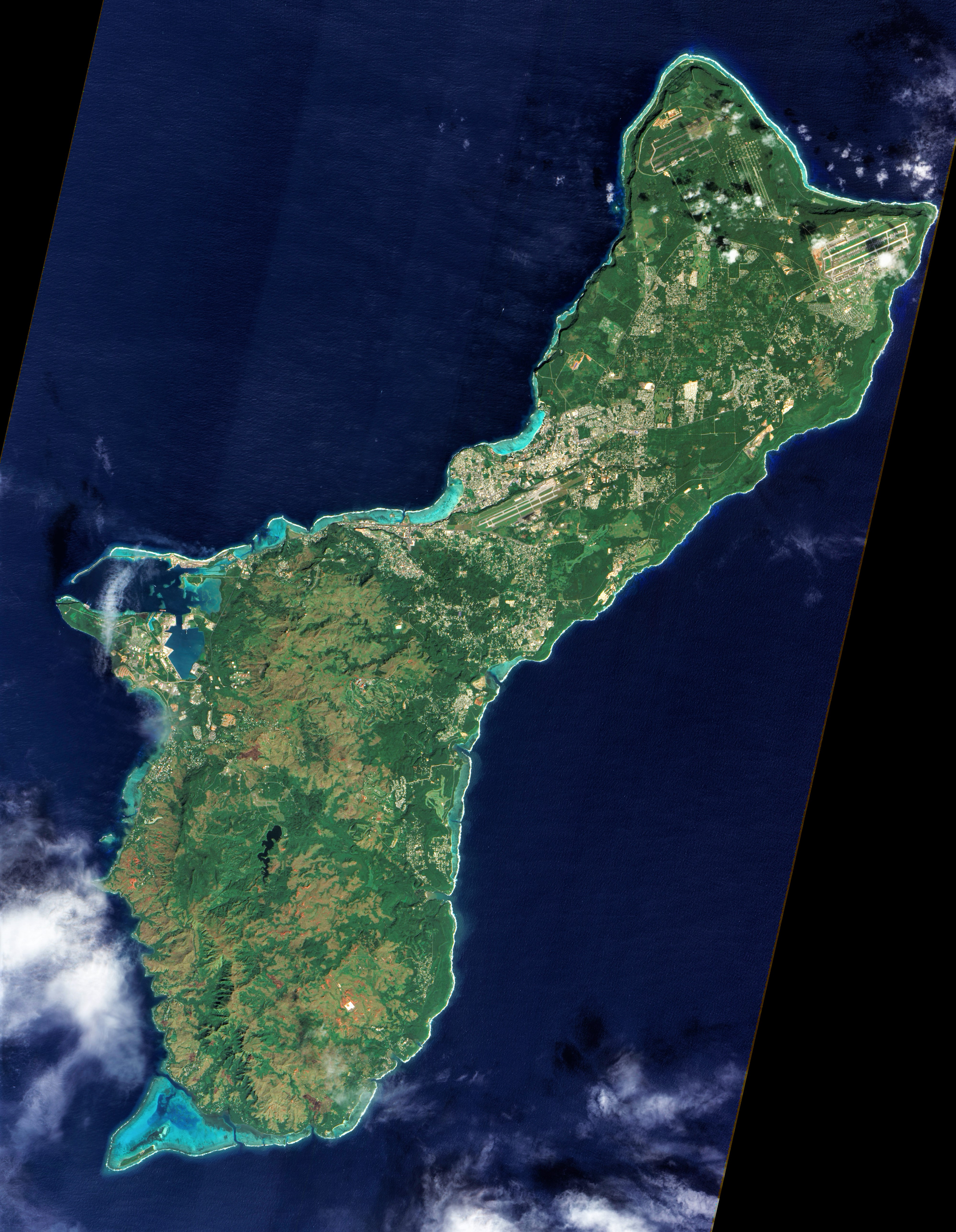
A photograph of Guam from space captured by NASA's now decommissioned Earth observation satellite, Earth Observing-1 (EO-1), December 2011.

Guam is 30.17 miles (48.55 kilometers) long and 4 to 12 miles (6 to 19 kilometers) wide. It has an area of 212 square miles (549 square kilometers). It is the 32nd largest island of the United States. It is the southernmost and largest island in the Mariana Islands, as well as the largest in Micronesia. Guam's Point Udall is the westernmost point of the U.S., as measured from the geographic center of the United States.

The Mariana chain, of which Guam is a part, was created by collision of the Pacific and Philippine Sea tectonic plates. Guam is located on the micro Mariana Plate between the two. Guam is the closest land mass to the Mariana Trench, the deep subduction zone that runs east of the Marianas. Volcanic eruptions established the base of the island in the Eocene, roughly 56 to 33.9 million years ago. The north of Guam is a result of this base being covered with layers of coral reef, turning into limestone, and then being thrust upward by tectonic activity to create a plateau.

The rugged south of the island is a result of more recent volcanic activity. Cocos Island off the southern tip of Guam is the largest of the many small islets along the coastline. Guam's highest point is Mount Lamlam at 1,334 feet (407 meters) above sea level. If its base is considered to be the nearby Challenger Deep, the deepest surveyed point in the Oceans, Mount Lamlam is the world's tallest mountain at 37,820 feet (11,530 m).

Politically, Guam is divided into 19 villages. The majority of the population lives on the coralline limestone plateaus of the north, with political and economic activity centered in the central and northern regions. The rugged geography of the south largely limits settlement to rural coastal areas. The western coast is leeward of the trade winds and is the location of Apra Harbor, the capital Hagåtña, and the tourist center of Tumon. The U.S. Defense Department owns about 29% of the island, under the management of Joint Region Marianas.

=== Climate ===
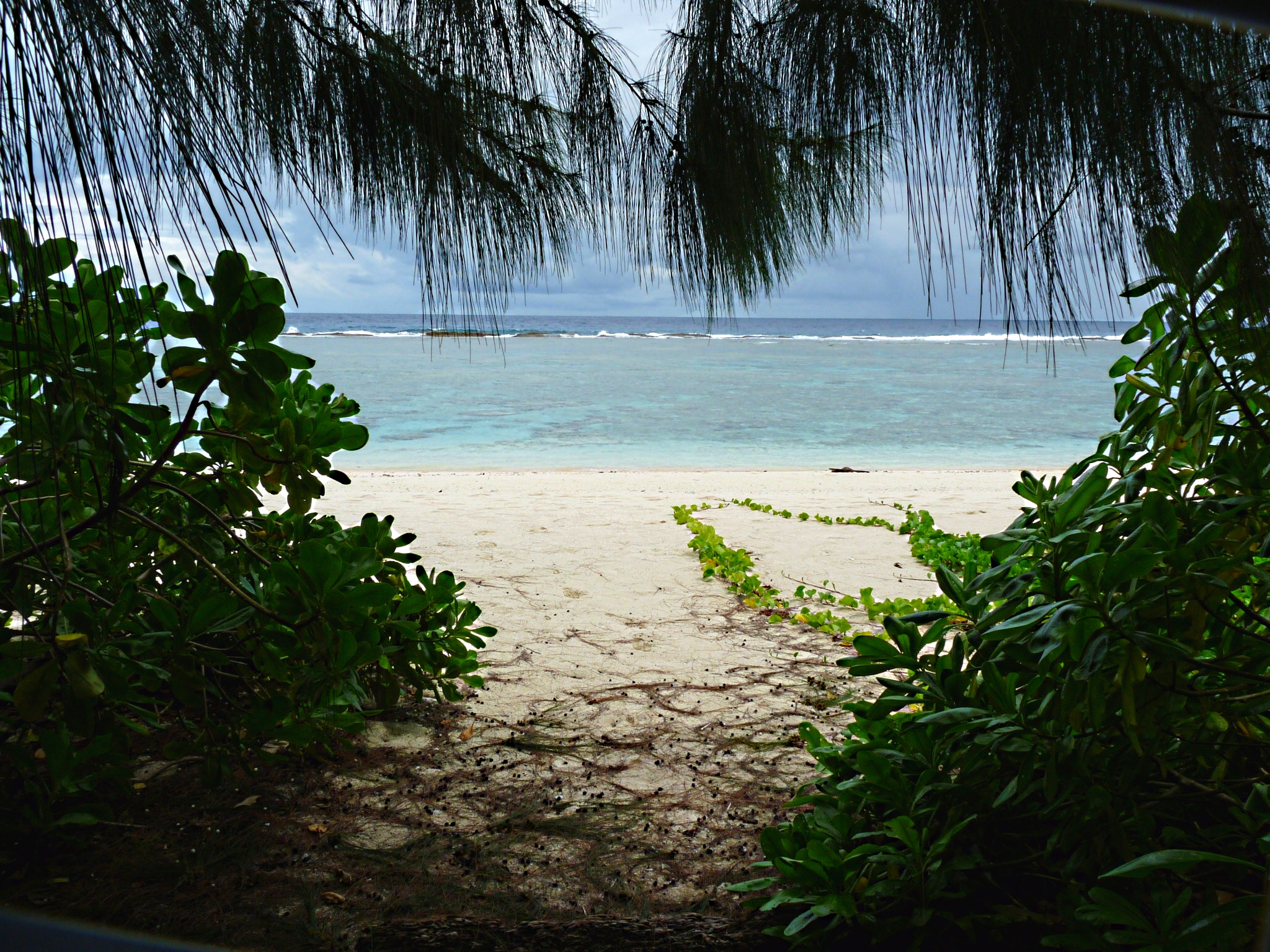
Guam National Wildlife Refuge beach at Ritidian Point

Guam has a tropical rainforest climate on the Köppen scale (Köppen Af). Its driest month of March almost qualifies as a tropical monsoon climate (Köppen Am). The weather is generally hot and humid throughout the year with little seasonal temperature variation. Guam is known to have equable temperatures year-round. Trade winds are fairly constant throughout the year. There is often a weak westerly monsoon influence in the summer months.

Guam has two distinct seasons: Wet and dry season. The dry season runs from January through May. June is the transitional period. The wet season runs from July through November. Guam's average annual rainfall was 98 inches or 2,490 millimeters between 1981 and 2010.

The wettest month on record at Guam Airport has been August 1997 with 38.49 inches (977.6 mm). The driest was February 2015 with 0.15 inches (3.8 mm). The wettest calendar year was 1976 with 131.70 inches (3,345.2 mm). The driest year was in 1998 with 57.88 inches (1,470.2 mm). The most rainfall in a single day occurred on October 15, 1953, when 15.48 inches or 393.2 millimeters fell.

The mean high temperature is 86 °F or 30 °C. The mean low is 76 °F (24.4 °C). Temperatures rarely exceed 90 °F (32.2 °C) or fall below 70 °F (21.1 °C). The relative humidity commonly exceeds 84 percent at night throughout the year, but the average monthly humidity hovers near 66 percent.

The highest temperature ever recorded in Guam was 96 °F (35.6 °C) on April 18, 1971, and April 1, 1990. A record low of 69 °F (21 °C) was set on February 1, 2021. The lowest recorded temperature was 65 °F (18.3 °C), set on February 8, 1973.

Guam lies in the path of typhoons and it is common for the island to be threatened by tropical storms and possible typhoons during the wet season. The highest risk of typhoons is from August through November, where typhoons and tropical storms are most probable in the western Pacific. They can, however, occur year-round. Typhoons that have caused major damage on Guam in the American period include the Typhoon of 1900, Karen (1962), Pamela (1976), Paka (1997), Pongsona (2002), and Mawar (2023).

Since Typhoon Pamela in 1976, wooden structures have been largely replaced by concrete structures. During the 1980s, wooden utility poles began to be replaced by typhoon-resistant concrete and steel poles. After the local Government enforced stricter construction codes, many home and business owners have built their structures out of reinforced concrete with installed typhoon shutters.

Climate data for Guam International Airport (1991–2020 normals, extremes 1945–present)
Month	Jan	Feb	Mar	Apr	May	Jun	Jul	Aug	Sep	Oct	Nov	Dec	Year
Record high °F (°C)	94 (34)	93 (34)	93 (34)	96 (36)	94 (34)	95 (35)	95 (35)	94 (34)	94 (34)	93 (34)	92 (33)	91 (33)	96 (36)
Mean maximum °F (°C)	88.4 (31.3)	88.5 (31.4)	89.2 (31.8)	90.2 (32.3)	90.8 (32.7)	91.1 (32.8)	90.8 (32.7)	90.6 (32.6)	90.4 (32.4)	90.4 (32.4)	89.9 (32.2)	88.8 (31.6)	92.0 (33.3)
Mean daily maximum °F (°C)	85.7 (29.8)	85.7 (29.8)	86.7 (30.4)	87.9 (31.1)	88.5 (31.4)	88.5 (31.4)	87.7 (30.9)	87.0 (30.6)	87.0 (30.6)	87.2 (30.7)	87.4 (30.8)	86.6 (30.3)	87.2 (30.7)
Daily mean °F (°C)	80.3 (26.8)	80.1 (26.7)	81.0 (27.2)	82.3 (27.9)	83.0 (28.3)	83.1 (28.4)	82.2 (27.9)	81.5 (27.5)	81.5 (27.5)	81.7 (27.6)	82.2 (27.9)	81.6 (27.6)	81.7 (27.6)
Mean daily minimum °F (°C)	75.0 (23.9)	74.6 (23.7)	75.4 (24.1)	76.7 (24.8)	77.5 (25.3)	77.7 (25.4)	76.8 (24.9)	76.1 (24.5)	76.0 (24.4)	76.3 (24.6)	77.0 (25.0)	76.5 (24.7)	76.3 (24.6)
Mean minimum °F (°C)	71.6 (22.0)	71.4 (21.9)	71.9 (22.2)	73.3 (22.9)	74.1 (23.4)	74.6 (23.7)	73.8 (23.2)	73.4 (23.0)	73.3 (22.9)	73.4 (23.0)	73.9 (23.3)	73.3 (22.9)	70.2 (21.2)
Record low °F (°C)	66 (19)	65 (18)	66 (19)	68 (20)	70 (21)	70 (21)	70 (21)	70 (21)	70 (21)	67 (19)	68 (20)	68 (20)	65 (18)
Average precipitation inches (mm)	5.34 (136)	4.15 (105)	2.77 (70)	3.50 (89)	4.45 (113)	6.51 (165)	12.25 (311)	17.66 (449)	15.17 (385)	12.73 (323)	8.29 (211)	5.30 (135)	98.12 (2,492)
Average precipitation days (≥ 0.01 in)	20.1	18.0	18.3	18.9	19.7	23.2	26.0	25.9	25.1	25.4	23.9	22.7	267.2
Average relative humidity (%)	83.7	81.9	83.1	82.0	82.7	82.7	87.3	88.7	88.8	88.3	86.6	83.0	84.9
Mean monthly sunshine hours	176.0	173.7	216.4	214.0	219.9	193.8	156.1	142.2	132.7	132.6	135.0	143.4	2,035.8
Percentage possible sunshine	50	53	58	57	56	50	39	37	36	36	39	41	46
Source: NOAA (relative humidity and sun 1961–1990)

=== Ecology ===
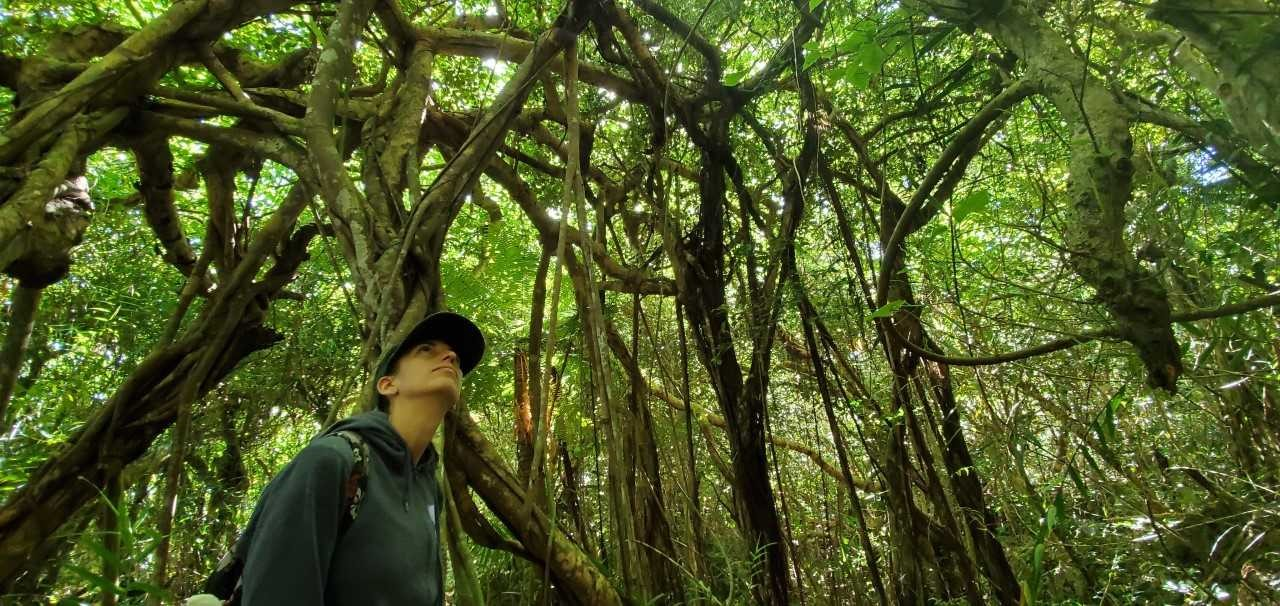
Hiking in Guam's limestone forest.

Guam is home to a diverse array of ecosystems, including coral reefs, deep seas, sea grasses, beach strand, mangroves, a variety of different limestone forest types, volcanic forests and grasslands, riparian systems, and caves. There are approximately 17 species of plant that are endemic only to the island of Guam, and many more that are endemic to the Mariana Islands. Numerous endemic insects have been described. There are approximately 29 land snails listed as endemic to the island of Guam, although many are now endangered or presumed extinct. Guam once hosted 14 kinds of terrestrial birds, 7 of which were endemic to Guam on the species or subspecies level, although all but one of the 14 are now extinct, extirpated, or endangered. Three locations on Guam (Guam National Wildlife Refuge, Cocos Island, and Mahlac Caves) have been identified as Important Bird Areas (IBA) by BirdLife International because they support populations of Micronesian starlings, Mariana swiftlets, Mariana crows, and Guam rails. The Guam rail became the second bird species to ever be downlisted from Extinct in the wild after a population was established on Cocos Island. Guam was home to three native bat species: the little Mariana fruit bat (Pteropus tokudae), now extinct; the endangered Pacific sheath-tailed bat (Emballonura semicaudata rotensis); and the endangered Mariana fruit bat (Pteropus mariannus mariannus).

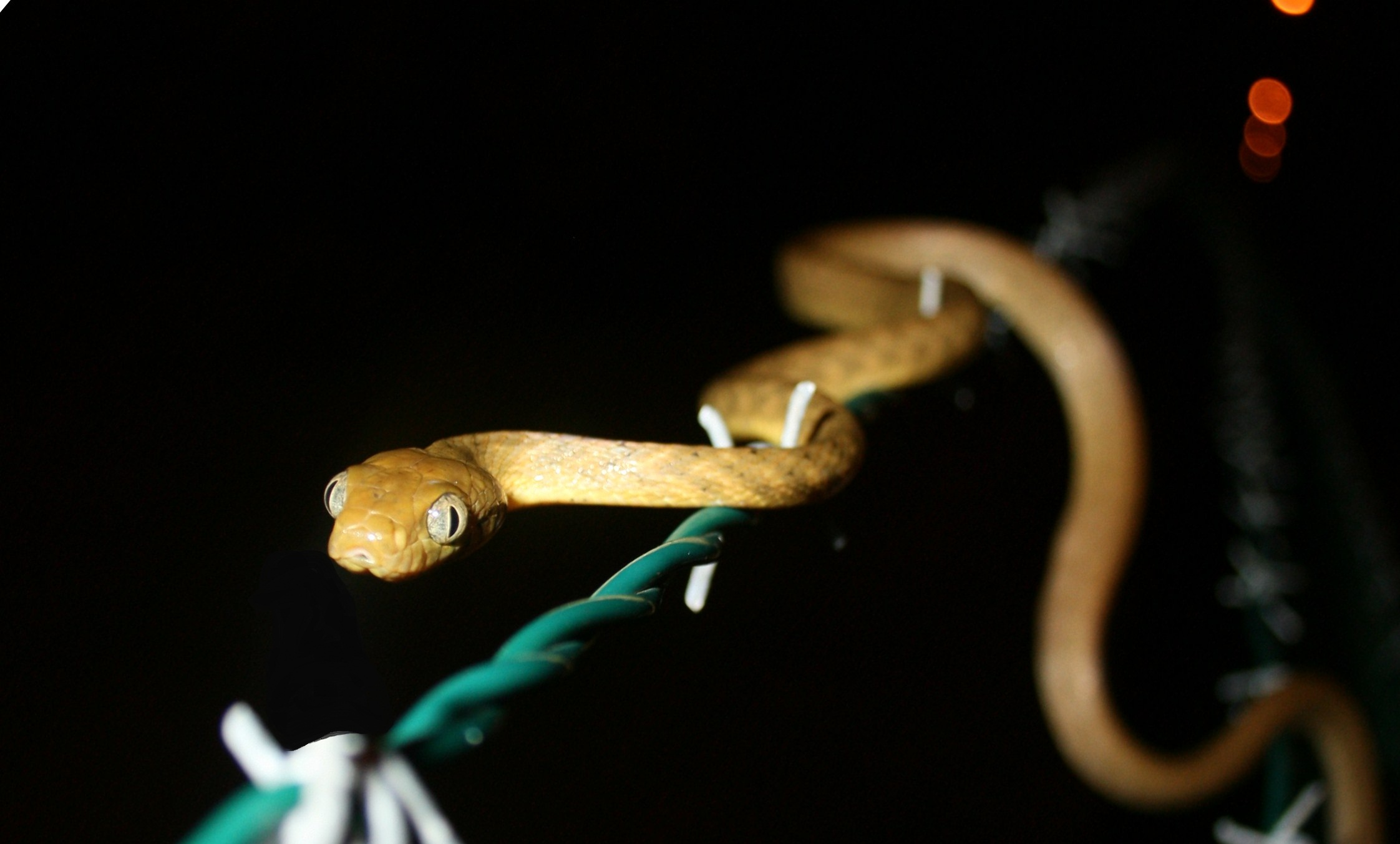
The introduction of the brown tree snake nearly eradicated the native bird population.

Guam has experienced severe effects of invasive species upon the natural biodiversity of the island. These include the local extinction of endemic bird species after the introduction of the brown tree snake, an infestation of the coconut rhinoceros beetle destroying coconut palms, and the effect of introduced feral mammals and amphibians.

Wildfires plague the forested areas of Guam every dry season despite the island's humid climate. Most fires are caused by humans with 80% resulting from arson. Poachers often start fires to attract deer to the new growth. Invasive grass species that rely on fire as part of their natural life cycle grow in many regularly burned areas. Grasslands and "barrens" have replaced previously forested areas leading to greater soil erosion.

During the rainy season, sediment is carried by the heavy rains into the Fena Lake Reservoir and Ugum River, leading to water quality problems for southern Guam. Eroded silt also destroys the marine life in reefs around the island. Soil stabilization efforts by volunteers and forestry workers (planting trees) have had little success in preserving natural habitats.

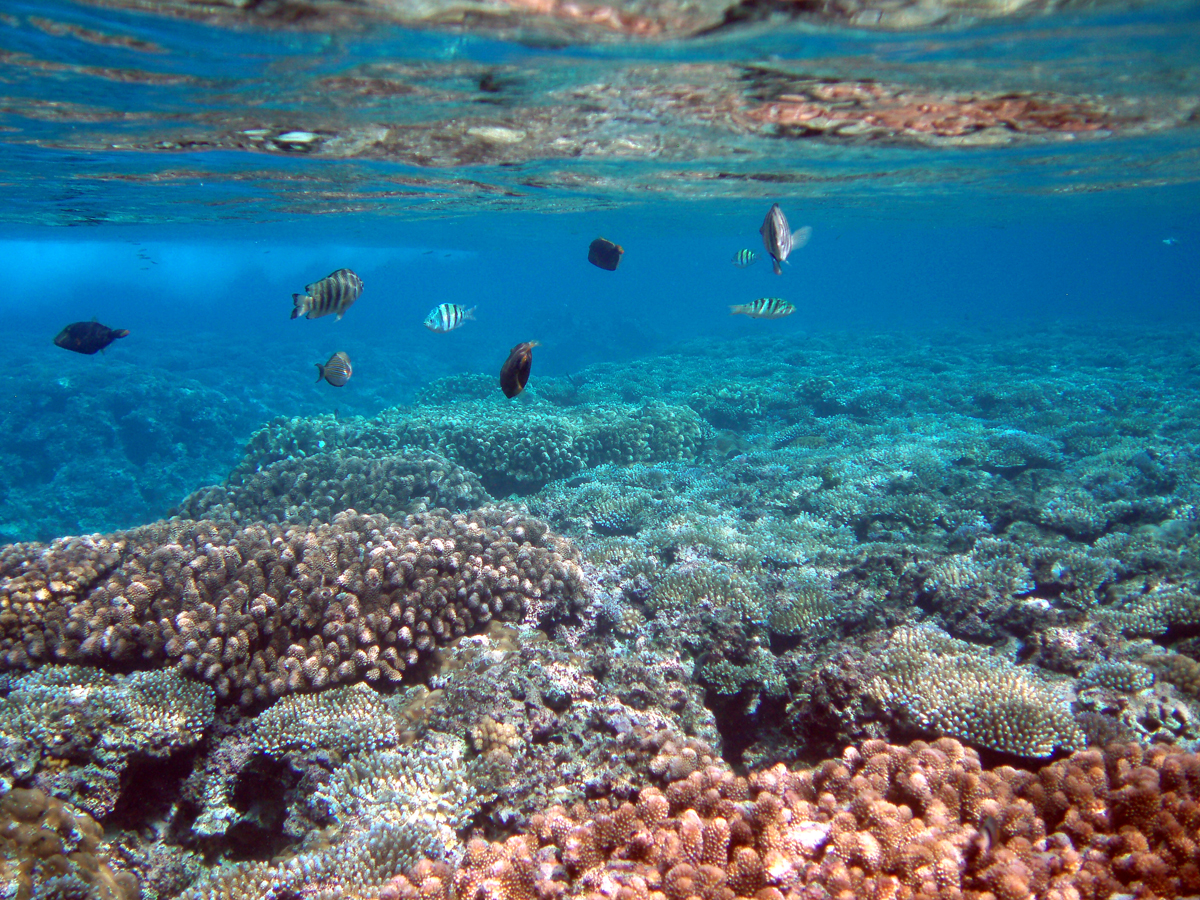
Previously extensively dredged, Tumon Bay is now a marine preserve.

Efforts have been made to protect Guam's coral reef habitats from pollution, eroded silt and overfishing, problems that have led to decreased fish populations. This has both ecological and economic value, as Guam is a significant vacation spot for scuba divers, and one study found that Guam's reefs are worth $127 million per year. In recent years, the Department of Agriculture, Division of Aquatic and Wildlife Resources has established several new marine preserves where fish populations are monitored by biologists. These are located at Pati Point, Piti Bomb Holes, Sasa Bay, Achang Reef Flat, and Tumon Bay.

Before adopting U.S. Environmental Protection Agency standards, portions of Tumon Bay were dredged by the hotel chains to provide a better experience for hotel guests. Tumon Bay has since been made into a preserve. A federal Guam National Wildlife Refuge in northern Guam protects the decimated sea turtle population in addition to a small colony of Mariana fruit bats.

Harvest of sea turtle eggs was a common occurrence on Guam before World War II. The green sea turtle (Chelonia mydas) was harvested legally on Guam before August 1978, when it was listed as threatened under the Endangered Species Act. The hawksbill sea turtle (Eretmochelys imbricata) has been on the endangered list since 1970. In an effort to ensure the protection of sea turtles on Guam, routine sightings are counted during aerial surveys and nest sites are recorded and monitored for hatchlings.

== Demographics ==
Historical population
Census	Pop.	Note	%±
1910	11,806		—
1920	13,275		12.4%
1930	18,509		39.4%
1940	22,290		20.4%
1950	59,498		166.9%
1960	67,044		12.7%
1970	84,996		26.8%
1980	105,979		24.7%
1990	133,152		25.6%
2000	154,805		16.3%
2010	159,358		2.9%
2020	168,485		5.7%

In the 2020 United States census, the largest ethnic group were the native Chamorros, accounting for 32.8% of the population. Asians, including Filipinos, Koreans, Chinese, and Japanese, accounted for 35.5% of the population. Other ethnic groups of Micronesia, including those of Chuukese, Palauan, and Pohnpeians, accounted for 13.2%. 10% of the population were multiracial, (two or more races). European Americans made up 6.8% of the population; 1% are African Americans, and 3% are Hispanic; there are 1,740 Mexicans in Guam, and there are other Hispanic ethnicities on the island. The estimated interracial marriage rate is over 40%.

The official languages of the island are English and Chamorro. Unlike most of its neighboring languages, Chamorro is not classified as Micronesian or Polynesian. Rather, like Palauan, it possibly constitutes an independent branch of the Malayo-Polynesian language family. Filipino is also commonly spoken across the island. Other Pacific and Asian languages are spoken in Guam as well. Spanish, which was the language of administration for 300 years, influenced the Chamorro language.

Religion in Guam (Pew Research Center 2020)
1. Christianity (94.0%)
2. Unaffiliated (1.80%)
3. Buddhism (1.10%)
4. Other religions (3.10%)

The predominant religion of Guam is Christianity. Three-quarters of the population adheres to Catholicism, while most of the remainder belong to Protestant churches. According to the Pew Research Center, the religious demography of Guam in 2010 was as follows:

- Catholicism: 75%
- Protestantism: 17.7%
- Other religions: 1.6%
- Folk religions: 1.5%
- Other Christianity: 1.4%
- Buddhism: 1.1%
- Eastern Orthodoxy: <1%
- Hinduism: <1%
- Islam: <1%
- Judaism: <1%

In 2020, the Vatican claimed that 87.72% of the population was Catholic, with 54 priests and 64 nuns across 27 parishes.

== Culture ==
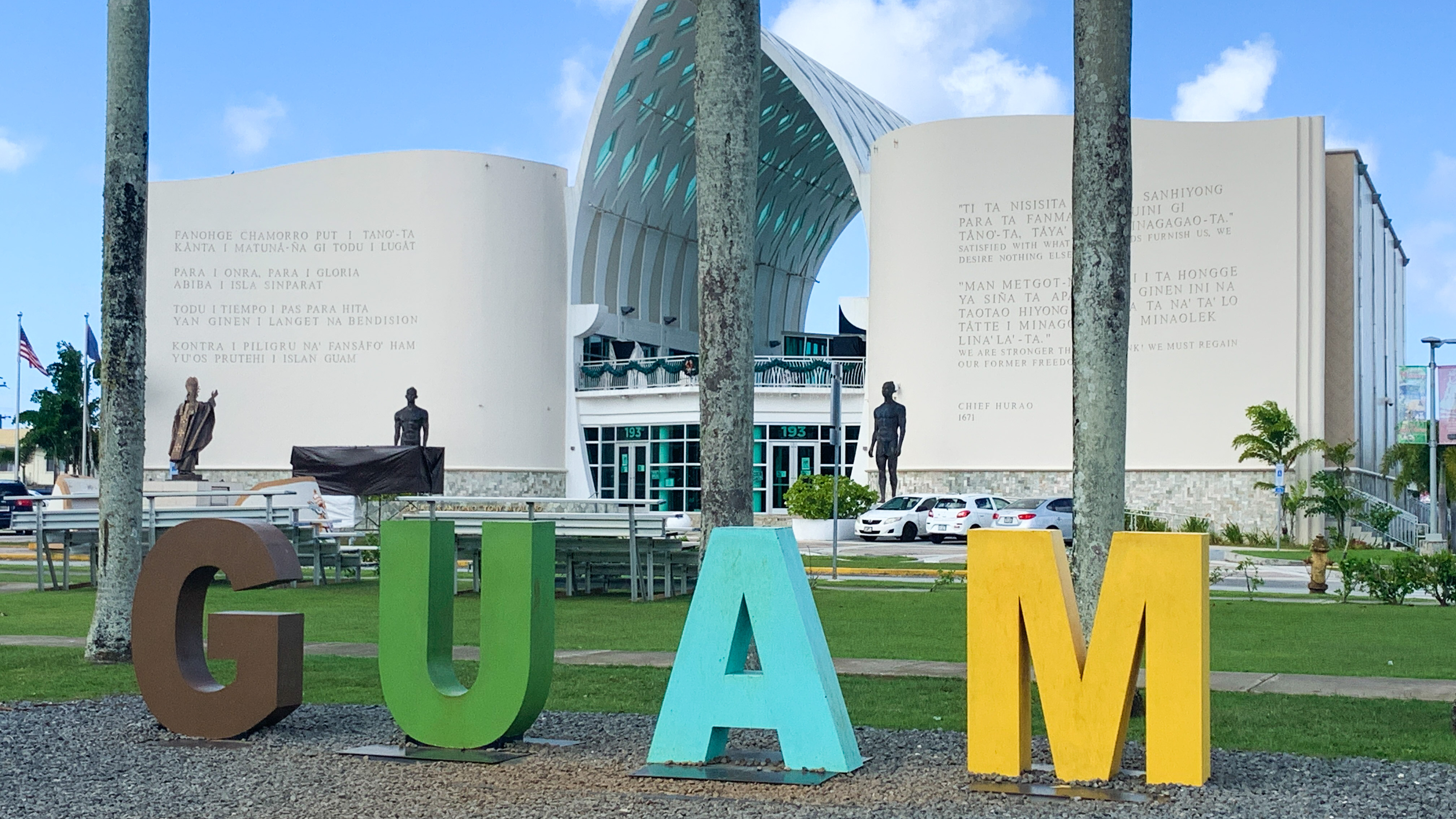
The Guam Museum in Hagåtña opened in 2016

The culture of Guam is a reflection of traditional Chamorro customs, in combination with American, Spanish and Mexican traditions. Post-European-contact Chamorro Guamanian culture is a combination of American, Spanish, Filipino, other Micronesian Islander and Mexican traditions. Few indigenous pre-Hispanic customs remained following Spanish contact, but include plaiting and pottery. There has been a resurgence of interest among the Chamorro to preserve the language and culture.

Hispanic influences are manifested in the local language, music, dance, sea navigation, cuisine, fishing, games (such as batu, chonka, estuleks, and bayogu), songs, and fashion. The island's original community are Chamorro natives, who have inhabited Guam for almost 4000 years. They had their own language related to the languages of Indonesia and southeast Asia. The Spanish later called them Chamorros. A derivative of the word, Chamorri, means "noble race". They began to grow rice on the island.

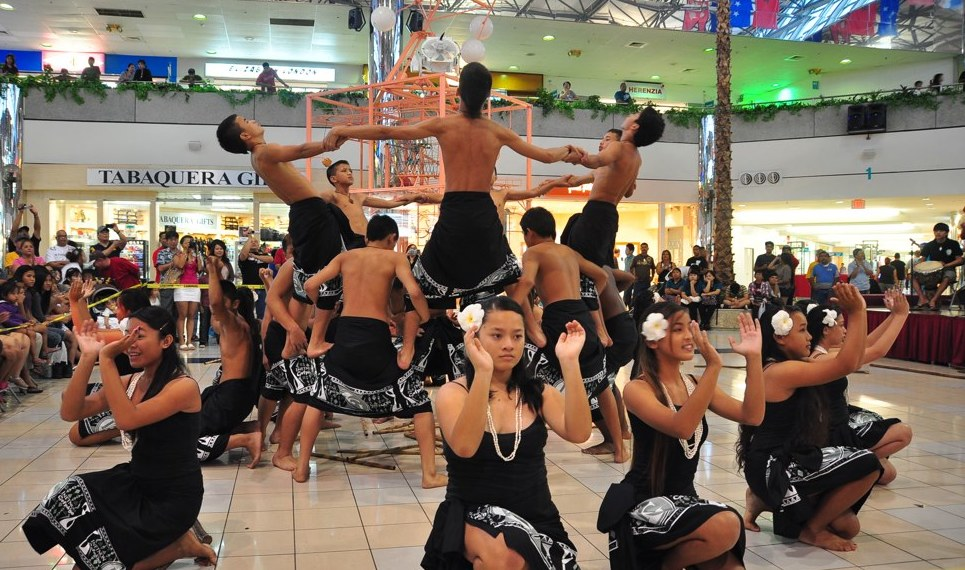
Youth performance of traditional dance at Micronesia Mall, 2012

Historically, the native people of Guam venerated the bones of their ancestors. They kept the skulls in their houses in small baskets, and practiced incantations before them when it was desired to attain certain objects. During Spanish rule (1668–1898) the majority of the population was converted to Catholicism and religious festivities such as Easter and Christmas became widespread. Many Chamorros have Spanish surnames, although few of the inhabitants are themselves descended from the Spaniards. Instead, Spanish names and surnames became commonplace after their conversion to Catholicism and the imposition of the Catálogo alfabético de apellidos in Guam.

Historically, the diet of the native inhabitants of Guam consisted of fish, fowl, rice, breadfruit, taro, yams, bananas, and coconuts used in a variety of dishes. Post-contact Chamorro cuisine is largely based on corn, and includes tortillas, tamales, atole, and chilaquiles, which are a clear influence from Mesoamerica, principally Mexico, from Spanish trade with Asia.

Due to foreign cultural influence from Spain, most aspects of the early indigenous culture have been lost, though there has been a resurgence in preserving any remaining pre-Hispanic culture in the last few decades. Some scholars have traveled throughout the Pacific Islands, conducting research to study what the original Chamorro cultural practices such as dance, language, and canoe building may have been like.

=== Sports ===
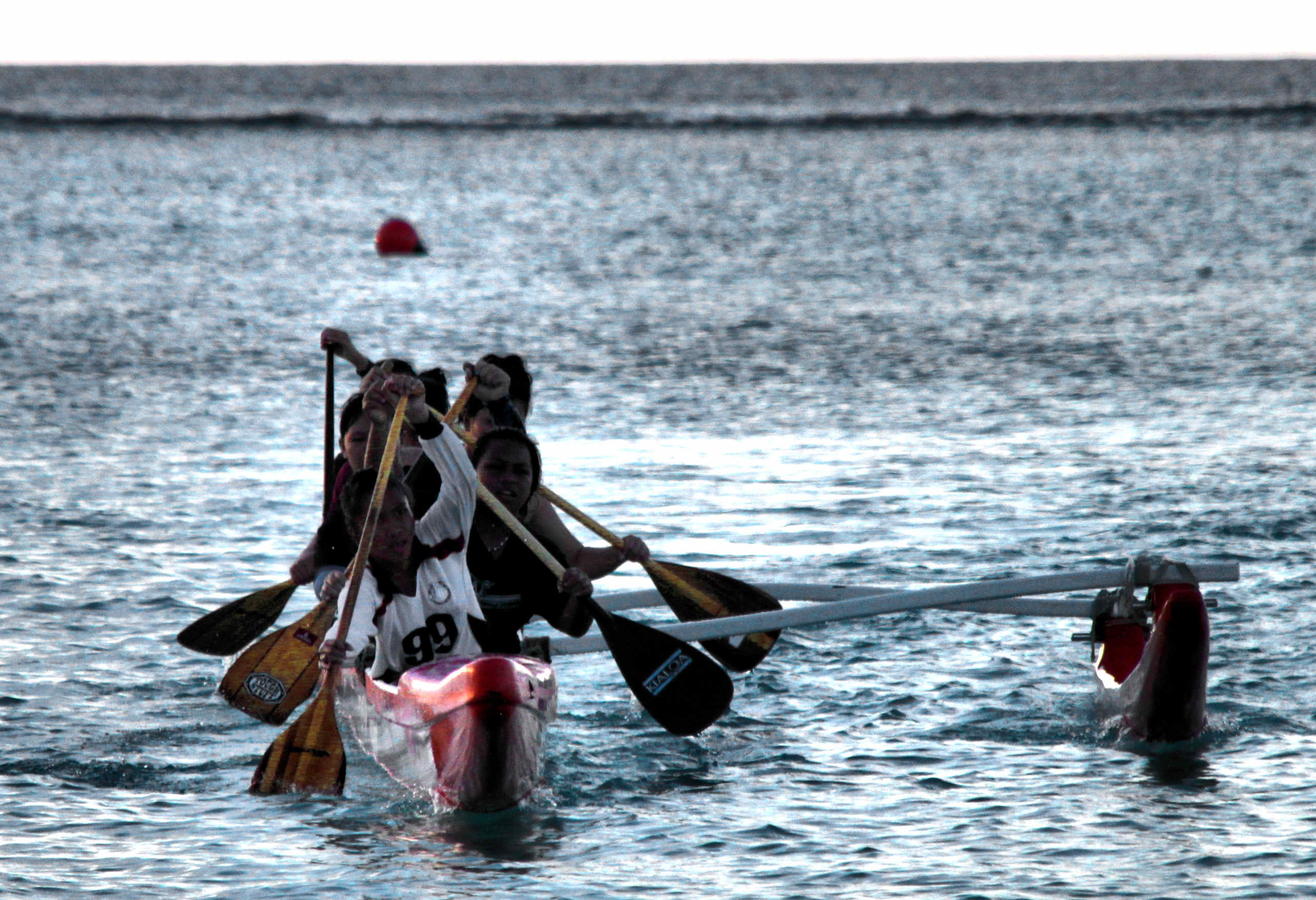
An outrigger canoe team at Tumon

Guam's most popular sport is American football, followed by basketball and baseball respectively. Soccer, Jiu Jitsu, and Rugby are also somewhat popular. Guam hosted the Pacific Games in 1975 and 1999. At the 2007 Games, Guam finished 7th of 22 countries in the medal count, and 14th at the 2011 Games.

Guam men's national basketball team and the women's team are traditional powerhouses in the Oceania region, behind the Australia men's national basketball team and the New Zealand national basketball team. As of 2019, the men's team is the reigning champion of the Pacific Games Basketball Tournament. Guam is home to various basketball organizations, including the Guam Basketball Association.

The Guam national football team was founded in 1975 and joined FIFA in 1996. It was once considered one of FIFA's weakest teams, and experienced their first victory over a FIFA-registered side in 2009. Guam hosted qualifying games on the island for the first time in 2015 and, in 2018, clinched their first FIFA World Cup Qualifying win. The Guam national rugby union team played its first match in 2005 and has never qualified for a Rugby World Cup.

As an aspect of cultural revival, sling competitions are also being organized on Guam. As a national pastime of cultural import, the ovoid shape on Guamanian flag is that of a sling stone.

== Economy ==
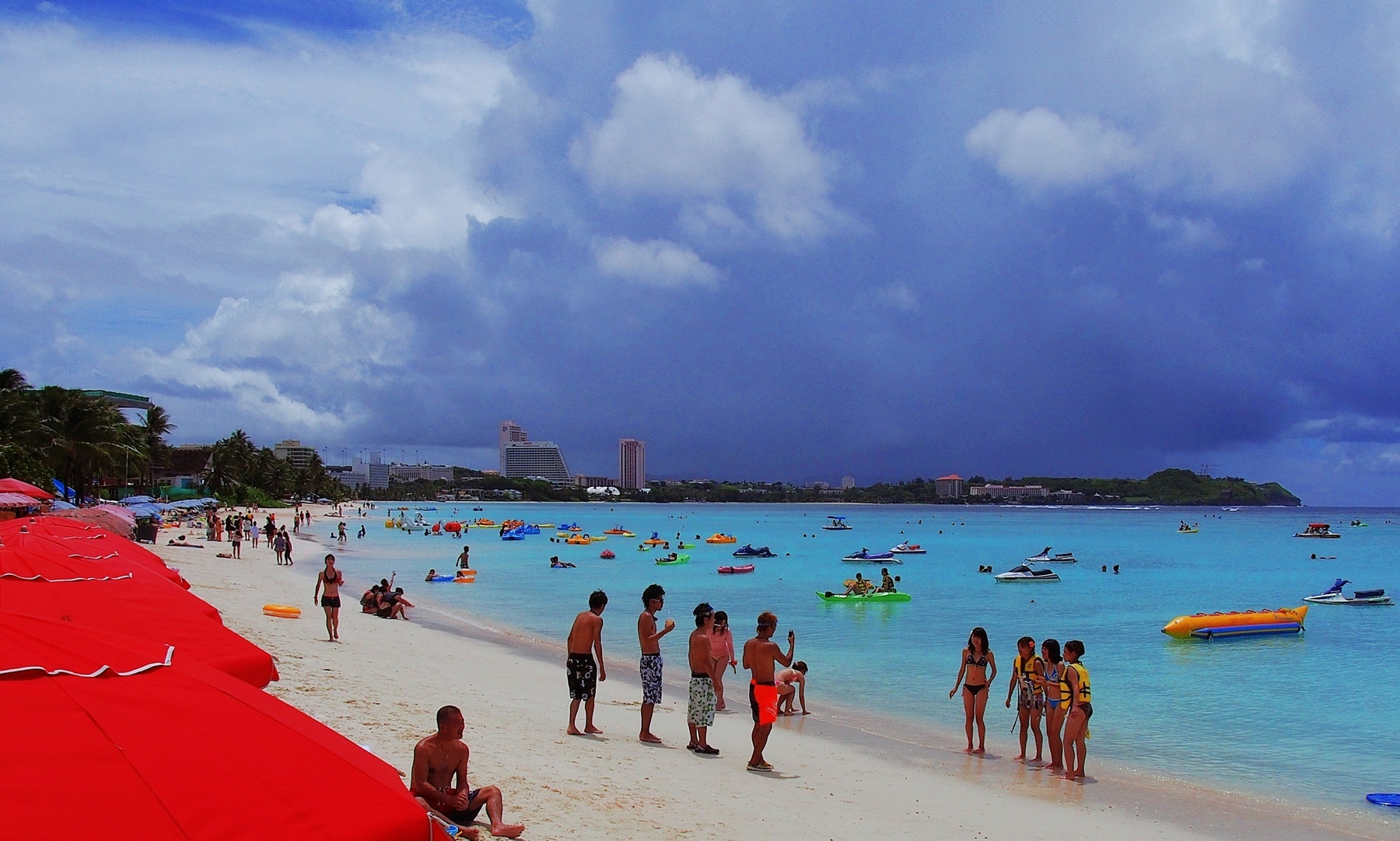
Beaches at the tourist center of Tumon

Guam's economy depends primarily on tourism, Department of Defense installations and locally owned businesses. Under the provisions of a special law by Congress, it is Guam's treasury rather than the U.S. treasury that receives the federal income taxes paid by local taxpayers, including military and civilian federal employees assigned to Guam.

=== Tourism ===
Lying in the western Pacific, Guam is a popular destination for Japanese and South Koreans. Its tourist hub, Tumon, features over 20 large hotels, a Duty Free Shoppers Galleria, Pleasure Island district, indoor aquarium, Sandcastle Las Vegas–styled shows and other shopping and entertainment venues. It is a relatively short flight from Asia, with 3 to 4-star hotels and seven public golf courses accommodating over a million tourists per year.

75% of the tourists are Japanese. Guam also receives a sizable number of tourists from South Korea, the U.S., the Philippines, and Taiwan. Significant sources of revenue include duty-free designer shopping outlets, and the American-style malls: Micronesia Mall, Guam Premier Outlets, the Agana Shopping Center, and the world's largest Kmart.

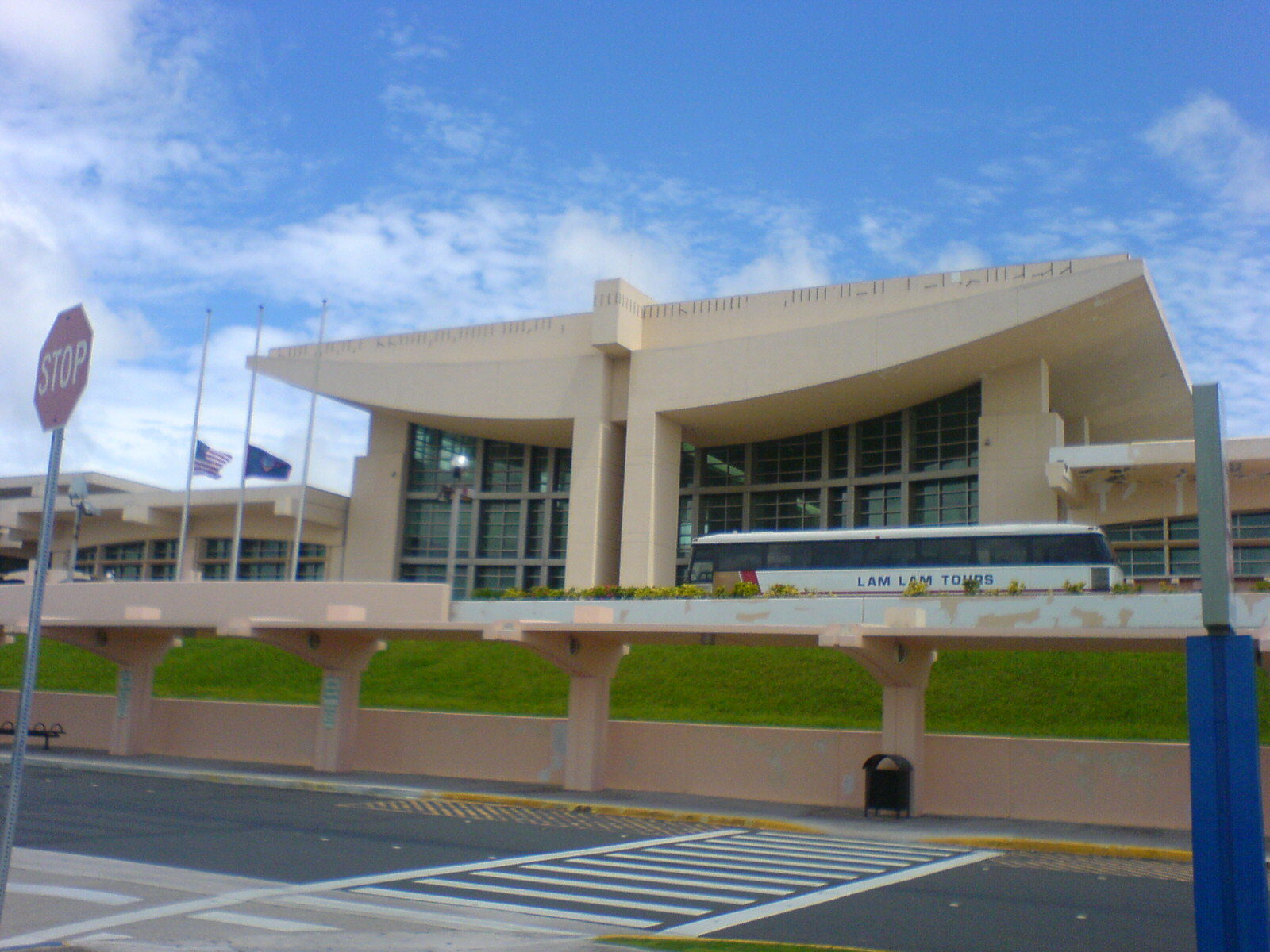
Terminal at Antonio B. Won Pat International Airport. The airport hosts a hub of United Airlines, Guam's largest private-sector employer.

The economy had been stable since 2000 due to increased tourism. Previously, it was expected to stabilize with a planned transfer of U.S. Marine Corps' 3rd Marine Expeditionary Force, in Okinawa, Japan (approximately 8,000 Marines, along with their 10,000 dependents), to Guam between 2010 and 2015. However, the move was delayed until late 2020. Also, the number of Marines to be moved from Okinawa to Guam decreased from 10,000 to 5,000, with the move now expected to be complete in 2025.

As of 2008, Guam's largest single private sector employer with about 1,400 jobs, was Continental Micronesia, a subsidiary of Continental Airlines. Continental Airlines merged with and is now a part of United Airlines, a subsidiary of Chicago-based United Airlines Holdings, Inc. As of 2008 the Continental Micronesia annual payroll in Guam was $90 million.

=== Budget and unemployment ===
In 2003, Guam had a 14% unemployment rate, and the government suffered a $314 million budget shortfall. As of 2019 the unemployment rate had dropped to 6.1%. By September 2020, the unemployment rate had risen again to 17.9%. As of June 2023 the unemployment rate had fallen to 4.0%. The unemployment rate in Guam for September 2023 was 4.1%, an increase of 0.1 percentage points from the June 2023 figure of 4.0%, and a reduction of 0.3 percentage points from the September 2022 figure one year earlier of 4.4%.

=== Pacific migration to Guam ===
The Compacts of Free Association (COFA) between the United States, the Federated States of Micronesia, the Republic of the Marshall Islands, and the Republic of Palau accords the former entities of the Trust Territory of the Pacific Islands a political status of "free association" with the United States. The Compacts generally allow citizens of these island nations to reside in the 50 United States, and in US territories. Many people from other Pacific islands were attracted to Guam due to its proximity, environmental, and cultural familiarity.

Due to the impact of increased utilization of public assistance programs due to immigration, aid has been provided to the nations receiving immigrants. In 2003, the amended COFA was enacted, which provided 30 million dollars annually to Guam, Hawaii, American Samoa and the Northern Mariana Islands, as well as to forgive 157 million dollars of Guam's debt to the federal government to offset money already spent on public assistance programs. In 2024, the COFA was amended again to renew aid the freely associated nations as well as Guam and other U.S. Pacific territories.

=== Military bases ===
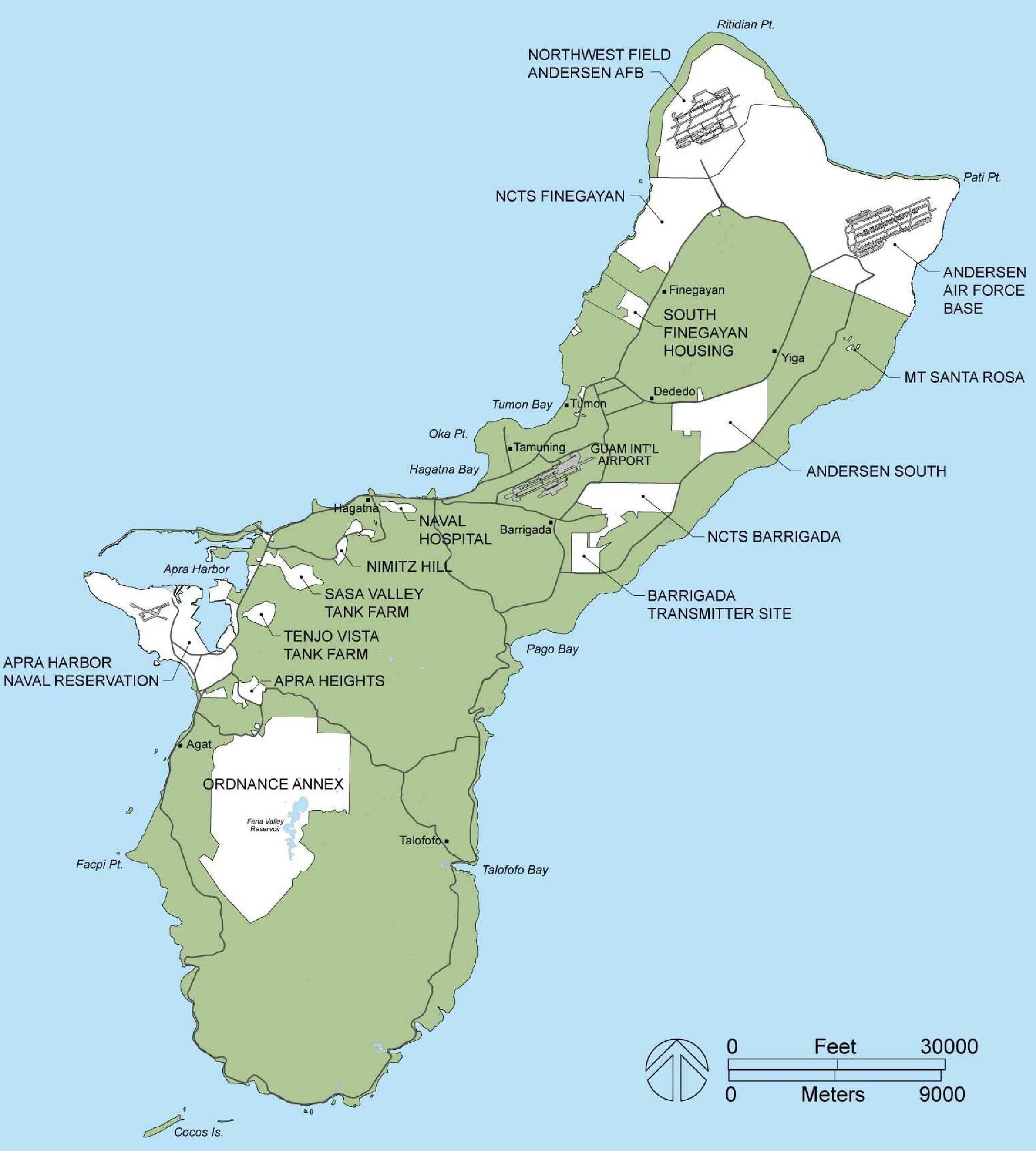
A map of U.S. military lands on Guam, 2010

Joint Region Marianas maintains jurisdiction over installations, which cover approximately 39,000 acres (16,000 ha), or 29% of the island's total land area. These include:

- U.S. Naval Base Guam, U.S. Navy (Santa Rita), comprising the Orote Peninsula, additional lands, and with jurisdiction of the majority of Apra Harbor
- Andersen Air Force Base, U.S. Air Force (Yigo), including Northwest Field
- Marine Corps Base Camp Blaz, U.S. Marine Corps (Dededo)
- Ordnance Annex, U.S. Navy – South Central Highlands (formerly known as Naval Magazine)
- Naval Computer and Telecommunications Station Guam, U.S. Navy (Dededo), sometimes referred to "NCTS Finegayan"
- Naval Radio Station Barrigada (Barrigada), often referred to as "Radio Barrigada"
- Joint Region Marianas Headquarters (Asan), at Nimitz Hill Annex
- Naval Hospital Guam (Agana Heights)
- South Finegayan (Dededo), a military housing complex
- Andersen South (Yigo), formerly Marine Barracks Guam until its closure in 1992
- Fort Juan Muña, Guam National Guard (Tamuning)

In 2010, the U.S. military proposed building a new aircraft carrier berth on Guam and moving 8,600 Marines, and 9,000 of their dependents, to Guam from Okinawa, Japan. Including the required construction workers, this buildup would increase Guam's population by a total of 79,000, a 49% increase over its 2010 population of 160,000. In a February 2010 letter, the United States Environmental Protection Agency sharply criticized these plans because of a water shortfall, sewage problems and the impact on coral reefs. As of 2022, the Marine Corps has decided to place 5,000 Marines on the island within the first half of the 2020s, with 1,300 already stationed on the base.

== Government and politics ==
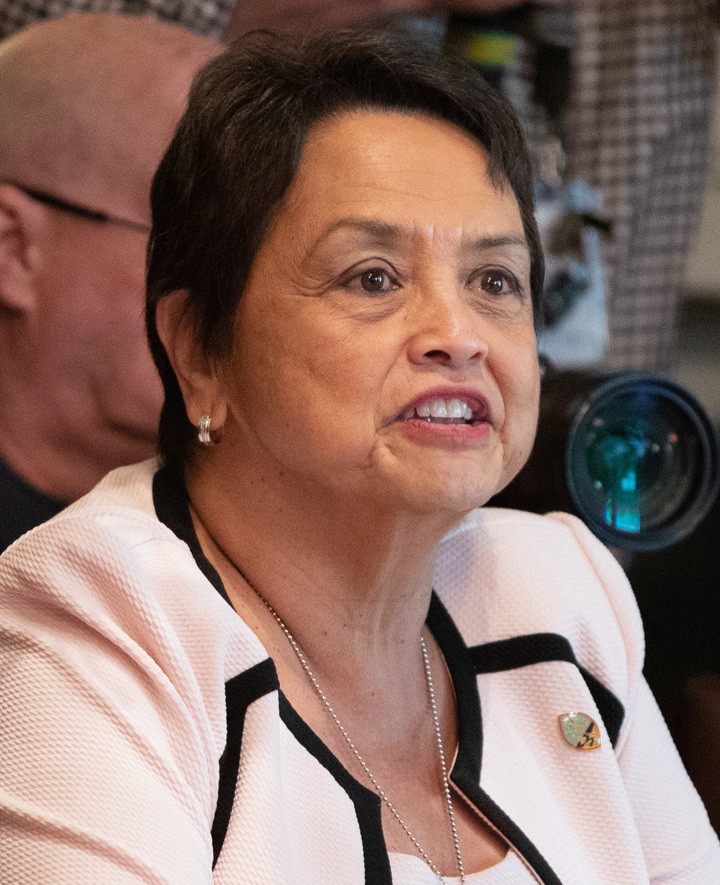
Incumbent governor Lou Leon Guerrero

Guam is governed by a popularly elected governor and a unicameral 15-member legislature, whose members are known as senators. Its judiciary is overseen by the Supreme Court of Guam.

The District Court of Guam is the court of United States federal jurisdiction in the territory. Guam elects one delegate to the United States House of Representatives, currently Republican James Moylan. The delegate does not have a vote on the final passage of legislation, but is accorded a vote in committee, and the privilege to speak to the House.

U.S. citizens in Guam vote in a presidential straw poll for their choice in the U.S. presidential general election, but since Guam has no votes in the Electoral College, the poll has no real effect. However, in sending delegates to the Republican and Democratic national conventions, Guam does have influence in the national presidential race. These delegates are elected by local party conventions.

=== Political status ===
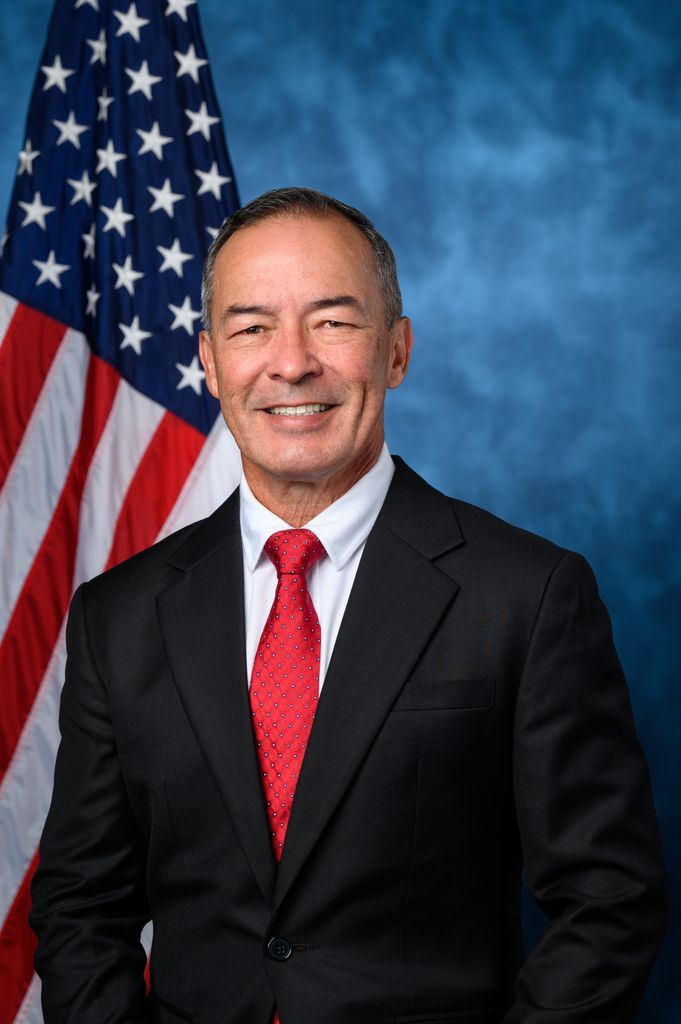
James Moylan is the Delegate for Guam's at-large congressional district.

In the 1980s and early 1990s, there was a significant movement in favor of this U.S. territory becoming a commonwealth, which would give it a level of self-government similar to Puerto Rico and the Northern Mariana Islands. In a 1982 plebiscite, voters indicated interest in seeking commonwealth status. However, the federal government rejected the version of a commonwealth that the government of Guam proposed, because its clauses were incompatible with the Territorial Clause (Art. IV, Sec. 3, cl. 2) of the U.S. Constitution. Other movements advocate U.S. statehood for Guam, union with the state of Hawaii, or union with the Northern Mariana Islands as a single territory, or independence.

The first Guam Constitutional Convention was funded by the 10th Guam Legislature and met from June 1, 1969, through June 29, 1970, with 43 elected delegates. The second Guam Constitutional Convention was convened on July 1, 1977, to create a constitution for Guam that would redefine the island's relationship with the US rather than merely modifying the existing relationship. The convention met periodically through October 31, 1977. Although approved at the federal level, the people of Guam overwhelmingly rejected the Constitution in a referendum held in August 1979, with 82% opposed. No new convention has been held pursuant to US congressional authority since 1979.

A Commission on Decolonization was established in 1997 to educate the people of Guam about the various political status options in its relationship with the U.S.: statehood, free association, and independence. The island has been considering another non-binding plebiscite on decolonization since 1998. The group was dormant for some years. In 2013, the commission began seeking funding to start a public education campaign. There were few subsequent developments until late 2016. In early December 2016, the Commission scheduled a series of education sessions in various villages about the current status of Guam's relationship with the U.S. and the self-determination options that might be considered. The commission's current executive director is Edward Alvarez and there are ten members. The group is expected to release position papers on independence and statehood but the contents have not yet been completed.

The United Nations is in favor of greater self-determination for Guam and other such territories. The UN's Special Committee on Decolonization has agreed to endorse the Governor's education plan. The commission's May 2016 report states: "With academics from the University of Guam, [the Commission] was working to create and approve educational materials. The Office of the Governor was collaborating closely with the Commission" in developing educational materials for the public.

The United States Department of the Interior approved a $300,000 grant for decolonization education, Edward Alvarez told the United Nations Pacific Regional Seminar in May 2016. "We are hopeful that this might indicate a shift in [United States] policy to its Non-Self-Governing Territories such as Guam, where they will be more willing to engage in discussions about our future and offer true support to help push us towards true self-governances and self-determination."

On July 31, 2020, the Government of Guam joined the Unrepresented Nations and Peoples Organization (UNPO).

Its future political status has been a matter of significant discussion, with public opinion polls indicating a strong preference of becoming a U.S. state.

=== Villages ===
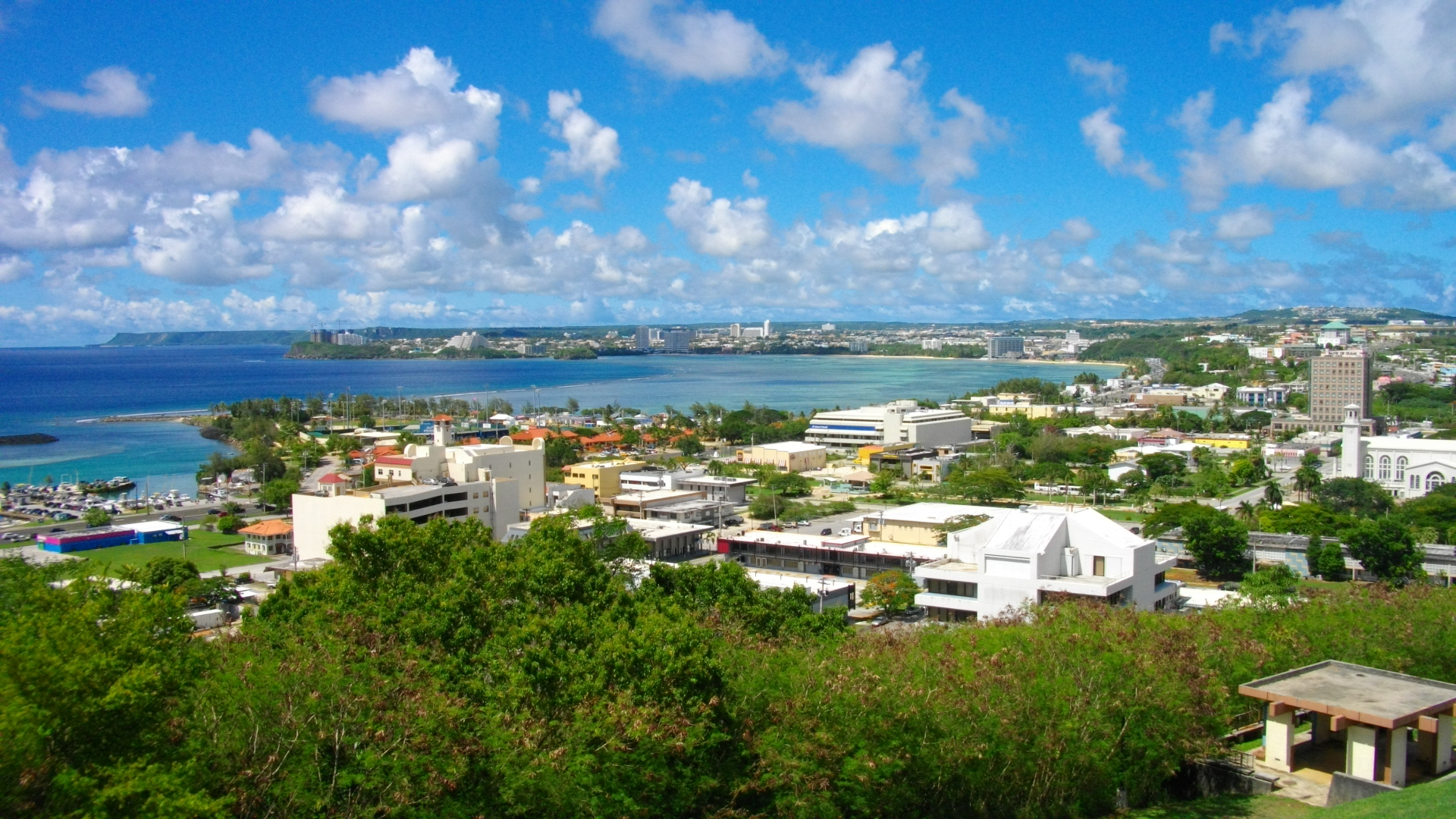
Hagåtña from the Spanish-built Fort Santa Agueda

Guam is divided into 19 municipal villages:

- Agana Heights
- Asan‑Maina
- Barrigada
- Chalan Pago‑Ordot
- Dededo
- Hågat
- Hagåtña
- Humåtak
- Inalåhan
- Malesso'
- Mangilao
- Mongmong‑Toto‑Maite
- Piti
- Sånta Rita-Sumai
- Sinajana
- Talo'fo'fo
- Tamuning
- Yigo
- Yona

The entirety of Guam is treated as both a territory and a county equivalent by the US Census, but the USGS counts the villages as county equivalents.

== Transportation and communications ==
Guam Highway 8 route marker

Most of the island has state-of-the-art mobile phone services and high-speed internet widely available through either cable or DSL. Guam was added to the North American Numbering Plan (NANP) in 1997. The country code 671 became NANP area code 671. This removed the barrier of high-cost international long-distance calls to the continental U.S.

Guam is a major hub for submarine communications cables between the Western U.S., Hawaii, Australia and Asia. Guam currently serves twelve submarine cables, with most continuing to China. In 2012 Slate stated that the island has "tremendous bandwidth" and internet prices comparable to those of the U.S. Mainland due to being at the junction of undersea cables.

In 1899, the local postage stamps were overprinted "Guam" as was done for the other former Spanish colonies, but this was discontinued shortly thereafter and regular U.S. postage stamps have been used ever since. Guam is part of the U.S. Postal System (postal abbreviation: GU, ZIP code range: 96910–96932). Mail to Guam from the U.S. mainland is considered domestic and no additional charges are required. Private shipping companies, such as FedEx, UPS, and DHL, however, have no obligation to do so, and do not regard Guam as domestic.

The speed of mail traveling between Guam and the states varies depending on size and time of year. Light, first-class items generally take less than a week to or from the mainland. Larger first-class or Priority items can take a week or two. Fourth-class mail, such as magazines, are transported by sea after reaching Hawaii. Most residents use post office boxes or private mail boxes, although residential delivery is becoming increasingly available.

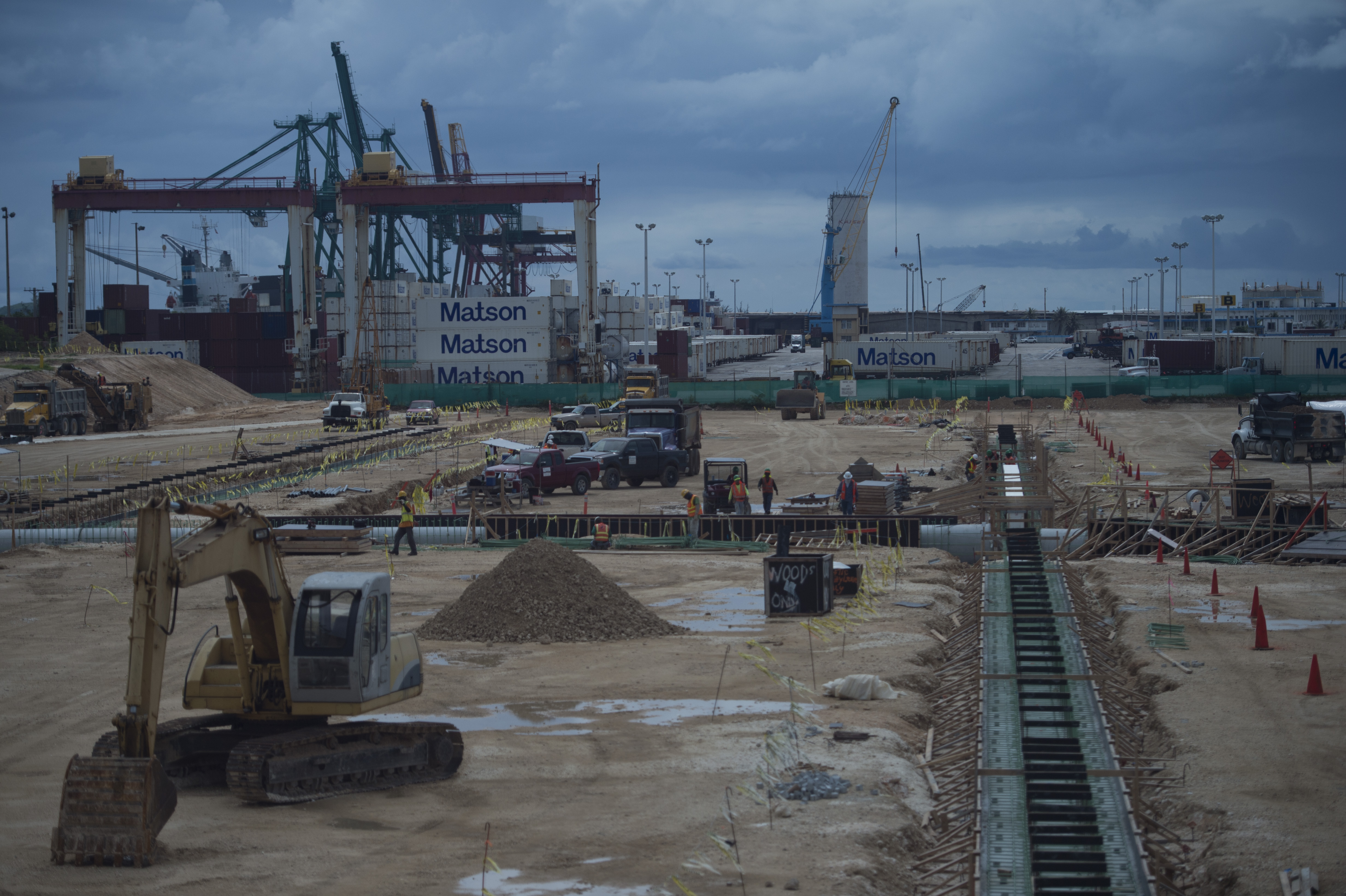
Construction at the Port of Guam, 2014

The Port of Guam is the island's lifeline, because most products must be shipped into Guam for consumers. It receives the weekly calls of the Hawaii-based shipping line Matson, Inc. whose container ships connect Guam with Honolulu, Hawaii; Los Angeles, California; Oakland, California; and Seattle, Washington. The port is also the regional transhipment hub for over 500,000 customers throughout the Micronesian region. The port is the shipping and receiving point for containers designated for the island's U.S. Department of Defense installations, Andersen Air Force Base and Commander, Naval Forces Marianas and eventually the Third Marine Expeditionary Force.

Guam is served by the Antonio B. Won Pat International Airport. The island is outside the United States customs zone, so Guam is responsible for establishing and operating its own customs and quarantine agency and jurisdiction. Therefore, the U.S. Customs and Border Protection only carries out immigration, but not customs functions. Since Guam is under federal immigration jurisdiction, passengers arriving directly from the United States skip immigration and proceed directly to Guam Customs and Quarantine.

Due to the Guam and CNMI visa waiver program for certain countries, an eligibility pre-clearance check is carried on Guam for flights to the States. For travel from the Northern Mariana Islands to Guam, a pre-flight passport and visa check is performed before boarding the flight to Guam. On flights from Guam to the Northern Mariana Islands, no immigration check is performed. Traveling between Guam and the States through a foreign point requires a passport.

Most residents travel within Guam using personally owned vehicles. The Guam Regional Transit Authority provides fixed route bus and paratransit services, and some commercial companies operate buses between tourist-frequented locations.

== Education ==
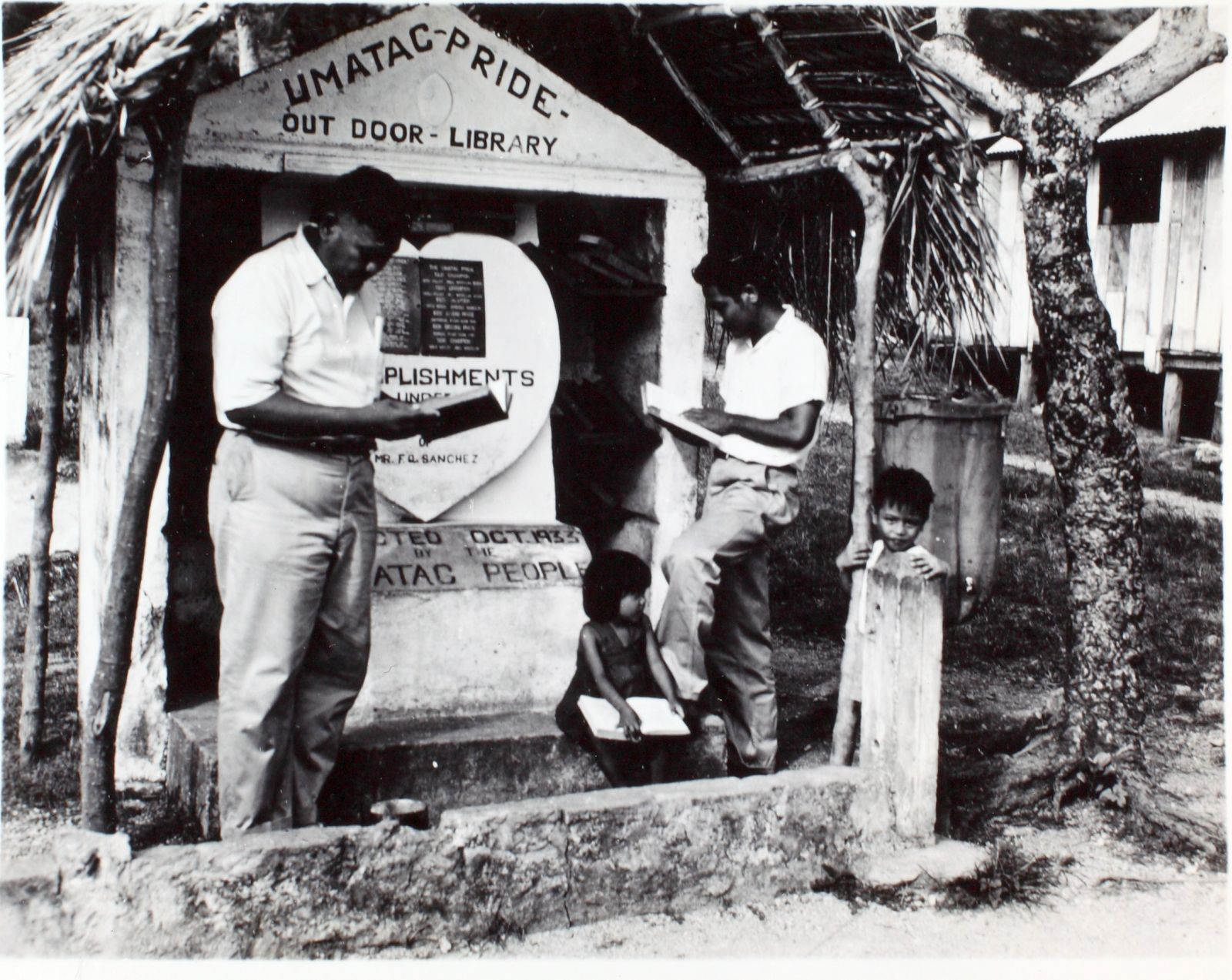
The Umatac Outdoor Library, built in 1933, was the first library in southern Guam.

Guam Public Library System operates the Nieves M. Flores Memorial Library in Hagåtña and five branch libraries.

The Guam Department of Education serves the entire island of Guam. In 2000, 32,000 students attended Guam's public schools, including 26 elementary schools, eight middle schools, and six high schools and alternative schools. Guam Public Schools have struggled with problems such as high dropout rates and poor test scores.

Guam's educational system has always faced unique challenges as a small community located 6,000 miles (9,700 km) from the U.S. mainland with a very diverse student body including many students who come from backgrounds without traditional American education. An economic downturn in Guam since the mid-1990s has compounded the problems in schools.

Before September 1997, the U.S. Department of Defense partnered with the Guam Board of Education. In September 1997, the Department of Defense Education Activity (DoDEA) opened its own schools for children of military personnel. DoDEA schools, which also serve children of some federal civilian employees, had an attendance of 2,500 in 2000. DoDEA Guam operates three elementary/middle schools and one high school.

The University of Guam (UOG) and Guam Community College, both fully accredited by the Western Association of Schools and Colleges, offer courses in higher education. UOG is a member of the exclusive group of only 106 land-grant institutions in the entire United States. Pacific Islands University is a small Christian liberal arts institution, nationally accredited by the Transnational Association of Christian Colleges and Schools.

== Health care ==
The Government of Guam maintains the island's main health care facility, Guam Memorial Hospital, in Tamuning. U.S. board certified doctors and dentists practice in all specialties. The U.S. Naval Hospital in Agana Heights serves active-duty members and dependents of the military community.

There is one subscriber-based air ambulance located on the island, CareJet, which provides emergency patient transportation across Guam and surrounding islands. A private hospital, the Guam Regional Medical City, opened in early 2016. Medicaid is accepted in Guam.

== See also ==
- 51st state
- Index of Guam-related articles
- Lists of hospitals in the United States#Insular areas
- List of people from Guam
- Outline of Guam
- Voting in Guam
