= Guam Regional Transit Authority =

Public transportation agency of Guam

- Service area: Guam
- Service type: Bus service
- Routes: 8
- Chief executive: Celestino "Cel" Babauta
- Website: grta.guam.gov

The Guam Regional Transit Authority (GRTA) is the public transportation agency of the United States territory of Guam. The agency operates eight bus routes across the island. Service operates from 5:30 a.m. to 7:30 p.m. Monday through Saturday, with no service on Sundays or holidays.

In 2011, budget problems nearly resulted in the agency shutting down. Later that year, GRTA received federal military and veterans assistance grants intended to support public transportation services for Guam's military population and veterans. The funding was also planned to support revisions to the transit system design.

As of January 2020, GRTA operated a fleet of 14 vehicles and served about 12,000 passengers per month.

== Bus routes ==
GRTA operates the following eight bus routes:

- Blueline 1: Hagatna – Tamuning – Micronesia Mall – Tumon – Hagatna
- Blueline 2: Hagatna – Asan – Piti – Agat – Piti – Asan – Hagatna
- Blueline Express: Hagatna – Tamuning – Tumon
- Greenline: Hagatna – Sinajana – Yona – Ipan – Talo'fo'fo
- Greyline: Dededo – Yigo and surrounding areas
- Orangeline: Harmon – Tiyan – Hagatna – Mongmong-Toto-Maite – Barrigada
- Redline: Hagatna – Agana Heights – Sinajana – Chalan Pago-Ordot – Mangilao – Barrigada – Mongmong-Toto-Maite – Hagatna
- Southern Shuttle: Agat – Umatac – Merizo – Inarajan – Talofofo
