= Demographics of Guam =

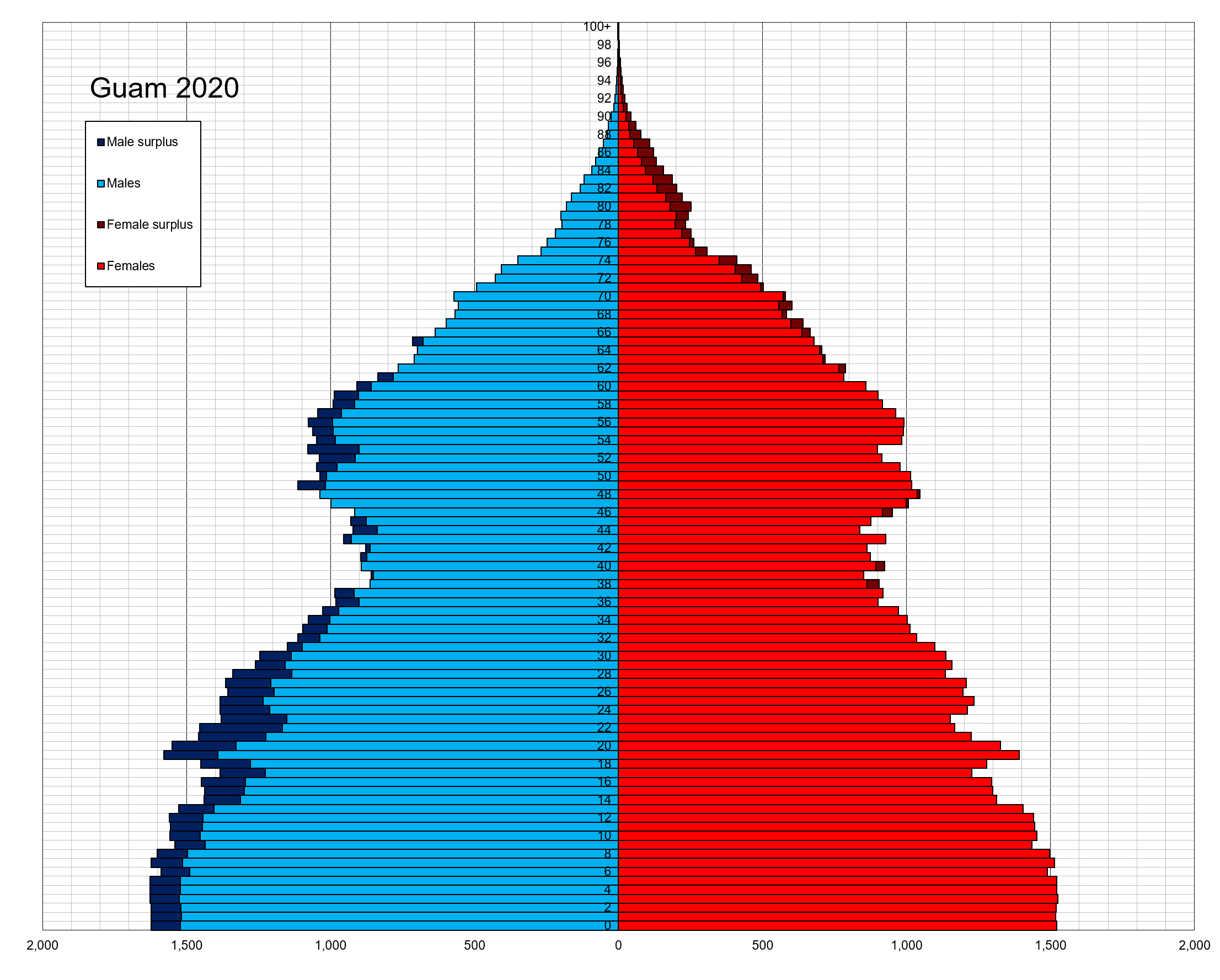
- Population pyramid of Guam in 2020
- Population: 169,086 (2022 est.)
- Growth rate: 0.16% (2022 est.)
- Birth rate: 18.56 births/1,000 population (2022 est.)
- Death rate: 6.03 deaths/1,000 population (2022 est.)
- Life expectancy: 77.5 years
  - male: 75.07 years
  - female: 80.08 years
- Fertility rate: 2.78 children born/woman (2022 est.)
- Infant mortality: 11.46 deaths/1,000 live births
- Net migration rate: -10.96 migrant(s)/1,000 population (2022 est.)
- Immigrant share: 50.2% (2024)

Age structure
- 0–14 years: 27.22%
- 65 and over: 9.54%

Sex ratio
- Total: 1.06 male(s)/female (2022 est.)
- At birth: 1.07 male(s)/female
- Under 15: 1.07 male(s)/female
- 65 and over: 0.71 male(s)/female

Nationality
- Nationality: Guamanian (US Citizens)

The demographics of Guam details an array of demographic statistics relating to the territory of Guam. This includes statistics on population, including the Indigenous population; religious affiliations; language; and immigration. The Demographics of Guam provides an overview of the history of Guam, as well as a depiction of the villages in the United States territory and its populace. The population of Guam, as of July 2021 was 168,801.

The demographics of Guam include the demographic features of the population of Guam, including population density, ethnicity, education level, health of the populace, economic status, religious affiliations and other aspects of the population.

== Population ==
While there are no large cities in Guam, the populace resides in villages. The most populated village in Guam is Dededo, with a population of 44,943 in 2010. The Indigenous people of Guam are known as the Chamorro people, and are the largest ethnic group in Guam. This group is categorised as a minority group in the United States territory. The 2021 mean age in the territory of Guam was 31.4 years. Guam is the largest and most populated of the territories in the Mariana Islands.

The population density of Guam is approximately 310 people per square kilometer. The total land area is 544 km^{2}. 94.9% of Guam's population lives in urban regions.

Historical population
Census	Pop.	Note	%±
1910	11,806		—
1920	13,275		12.4%
1930	18,509		39.4%
1940	22,290		20.4%
1950	59,498		166.9%
1960	67,044		12.7%
1970	84,996		26.8%
1980	105,979		24.7%
1990	133,152		25.6%
2000	154,805		16.3%
2010	159,358		2.9%
2020	153,836		−3.5%

In the 2020 U.S. census, Guam had a population of 153,836. This was a 3.5 percent decrease from the population of 159,358 in the 2010 census.

=== Structure of the population ===
Population Estimates by Sex and Age Group (01.VII.2021) (Including armed forces stationed in the area.):

Age group	Male	Female	Total	%
Total	86 910	81 891	168 801	100
0–4	8 032	7 525	15 557	9.22
5–9	7 973	7 461	15 434	9.14
10–14	7 663	7 088	14 751	8.74
15–19	7 087	6 296	13 383	7.93
20–24	7 342	6 165	13 507	8.00
25–29	6 740	5 916	12 656	7.50
30–34	5 787	5 376	11 163	6.61
35–39	4 866	4 626	9 492	5.62
40–44	4 412	4 372	8 784	5.20
45–49	4 735	4 656	9 391	5.56
50–54	5 245	4 767	10 012	5.93
55–59	5 149	4 792	9 941	5.89
60–64	4 121	3 981	8 102	4.80
65–69	3 121	3 193	6 314	3.74
70–74	2 354	2 558	4 912	2.91
75–79	1 201	1 402	2 603	1.54
80–84	717	1 027	1 744	1.03
85–89	279	525	804	0.48
90–94	75	140	215	0.13
95–99	10	23	33	0.02
100+	1	2	3	<0.01
Age group	Male	Female	Total	Percent
0–14	23 668	22 074	45 742	27.10
15–64	55 484	50 947	106 431	63.05
65+	7 758	8 870	16 628	9.85

== Births and deaths ==
Year	Population	Live births	Deaths	Natural increase	Crude birth rate	Crude death rate	Rate of natural increase	TFR
2009		3,391	835	2,556	19.8	4.7	15.1	2.72
2010	159,358	3,416	857	2,559	21.4	5.4	16.0	3.00
2011		3,298	842	2,456	20.6	5.3	15.3	2.86
2012		3,590	883	2,707	22.4	5.5	16.9	3.15
2013		3,285	873	2,412	20.5	5.4	15.1	2.87
2014		3,395	939	2,456	21.1	5.8	15.3	2.96
2015		3,366	985	2,381	20.8	6.1	14.7	2.93
2016		3,432	998	2,434	20.6	6.0	14.6	3.08
2017		3,297	990	2,317	19.7	5.9	13.8	2.97
2018		3,165	1,035	2,130	18.9	6.2	12.7	2.85
2019		3,041	1,002	2,039	18.1	6.0	12.1	2.74
2020	153,836	2,935	1,167	1,768	17.4	6.9	10.5	2.41
2021		2,623	1,276	1,347	15.5	7.6	7.9	2.36
2022		2,518			14.9			2.26
2023		2,353	1,184	1,169	13.9			2.11
2024		2,340	1,165	1,175	13.8	6.9	6.9	2.10

== Ethnic groups ==
- Chamorro 37.3%
- Filipino 26.3%
- Mixed 9.5%
- White 7.1%
- Chuukese 7%
- Korean 2.2%
- Other Pacific Islander 2%
- Other Asian 2%
- Chinese 1.6%
- Palauan 1.6%
- Japanese 1.5%
- Pohnpeian 1.4%
- Other 0.6%

Guam is known to be the first island in the Pacific Ocean to be settled by Europeans, being first observed by Spain in 1521. After contact with Guam was established by Ferdinand Magellan under the flag of Spain, the island was repeatedly invaded by foreign military forces. The island was officially claimed by Spain in 1565. It was the first island as well as the Mariana Islands, inhabited by humans in Remote Oceania. Guam has since been occupied by outside entities for over 330 years.

Magellan arrived on the shores of Guam with three ships, the Trinidad, the Conception and the Victoria. The population of Guam in the mid 16th century was severely reduced, due to bloodshed by Spain, as well as the many diseases carried by the Europeans. Guam was ceded to the United States after the Spanish–American War in 1898. It was then taken by the Japanese in 1941 during World War II. It was retaken by the United States in 1944.

While Guam covers a relatively small 520 km squared of land area, the United States territory is considered to be of international significance, due to geopolitics, as well as the strategic importance of Guam's straits, islands and canals. Guam is the largest landfall, for use of communications, military bases and shipping. Guam was utilised as a military base in World War II against the Japanese.

Guam is a multi-ethnic island, with disporia from the Philippines, Korea, Japan and China forming part of its populace. Guam was first settled by migrants from the Philippines in 1,500 to 1,400 BCE.

=== The Chamorro people ===
The Mariana Islands is an ethnic and cultural heritage of the Chamorro people. Despite the invasions from foreign powers, such as Spain, The United States of America and Japan, the Chamorro people have maintained their traditions. While Guam has remained a territory in the modern day, the Chamorro people of Guam have gained an amount of local political control of the island traditions.

In pre-Spanish times, Chamorro clans were divided into two distinct, ranked social castes. Social castes are different from social classes in that individuals are born into a particular caste and their status, therefore, could not be changed. Social classes, on the other hand, are more fluid and members can move between classes. The upper caste was known as chamorri, and the lower caste was known as manachang. Movement in between these castes, such as through marriage, was prohibited. Concubines or other relationships could be maintained only within one's social class. In addition, the chamorri caste was divided into an upper noble class called matao and a middle, or demi-noble class, known as acha’ot.

== Languages ==
- English 43.6%
- Filipino 21.2%
- Chamorro 17.8%
- Other Pacific island languages 10%
- Other Asian languages 6.3%
- Other 1.1%

== Religion ==
According to the Pew Research Center, 2020:

- Christians: 94%
- Unaffiliated: 1.8%
- Buddhists: 1.1%
- Muslims: <1%
- Hindus: <1%
- Jews: <1%

The Church of Jesus Christ of Latter-day Saints (LDS Church) reported 2,550 members in the LDS Church in Guam in 5 congregations as of 31 December 2019. On 4 May 2019, the church broke ground for a temple in Yigo.

In 2020, the Vatican noted that 87.72% of the population is Catholic, with 54 priests and 64 nuns across 27 parishes.

== See also ==
- Guamanian citizenship and nationality
