= Umatac Outdoor Library =

- U.S. National Register of Historic Places
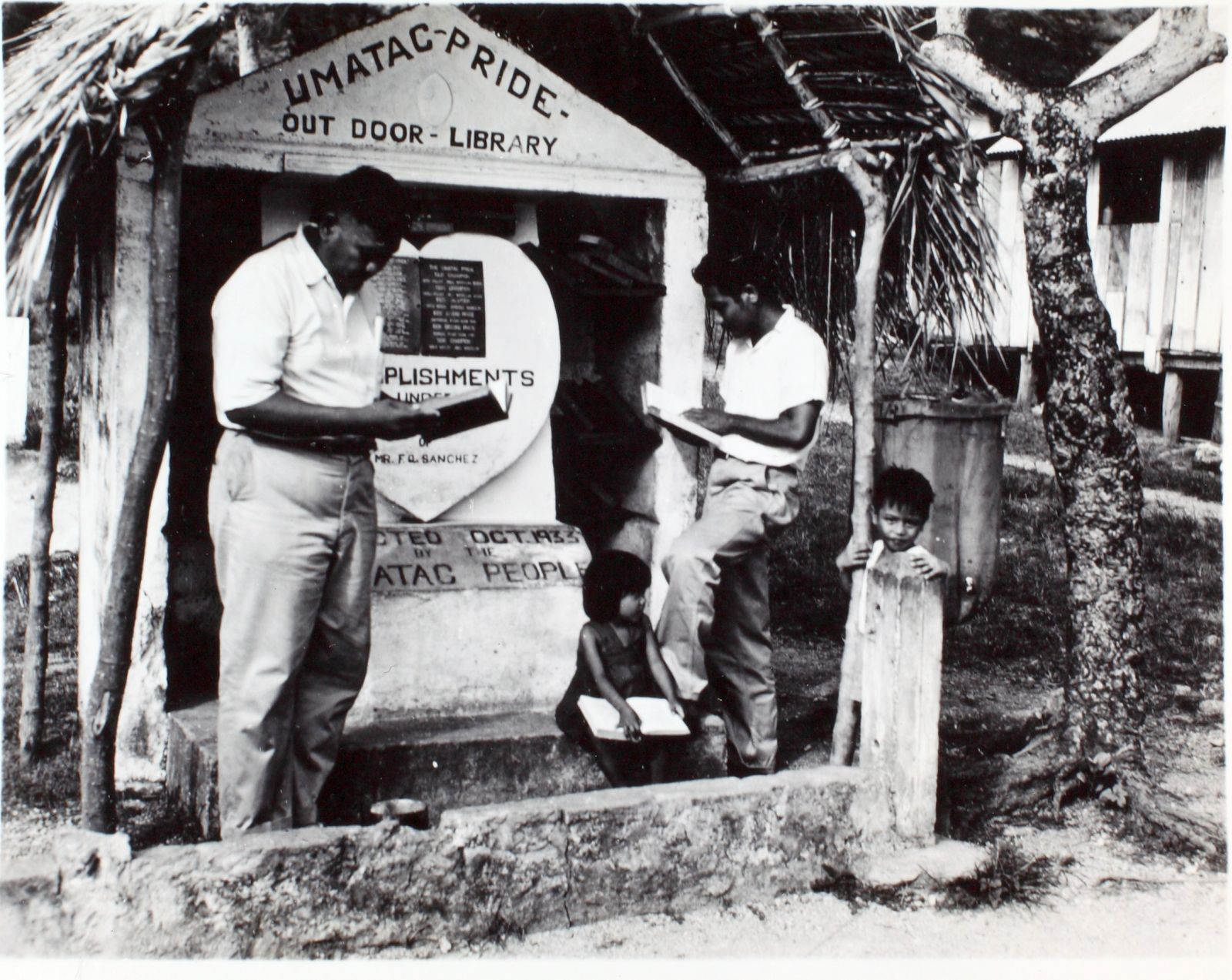
- Chamorro people at the Library, ca. 1944-1947

- Location within Guam
- Location: GU 4, Umatac, Guam
- Coordinates: 13°17′59″N 144°39′38″E
- Area: less than one acre
- Built: 1933
- Built by: Francisco Quinata Sanchez and Umatac villagers
- NRHP reference No.: 99001301
- Added to NRHP: November 12, 1999

The Umatac Outdoor Library, located on Guam Highway 4 in Umatac, Guam, was built in 1933 by Francisco Quinata Sanchez and Umatac villagers. It was listed on the National Register of Historic Places in 1999.
