= Circles of latitude between the 15th parallel north and the 20th parallel north =

Circles of latitude

Following are circles of latitude between the 15th parallel north and the 20th parallel north:

== 16th parallel north ==
16th parallel north (interactive map)

The 16th parallel north is a circle of latitude that is 16 degrees north of the Earth's equatorial plane. It crosses Africa, Asia, the Indian Ocean, the Pacific Ocean, Central America, the Caribbean, and the Atlantic Ocean.

At this latitude the sun is visible for 13 hours, 5 minutes during the summer solstice and 11 hours, 11 minutes during the winter solstice.

=== As a dividing line ===
After World War II, the parallel divided former French Indochina between Chinese administration in the north and British administrationin the south (see Allied post-war occupation of Vietnam).

In the Chadian–Libyan conflict, from 1984 the parallel, known as the "Red Line", delineated areas controlled by opposing combatants. Previously the Red Line had been the 15th parallel north. (See also Operation Manta)

=== Around the world ===
Starting at the Prime Meridian and heading eastwards, the parallel 16° north passes through:

Coordinates	Country, territory or sea	Notes
16°0′N 0°0′E	Mali	
16°0′N 4°0′E	Niger	
16°0′N 14°39′E	Chad	
16°0′N 24°0′E	Sudan	
16°0′N 36°50′E	Eritrea	
16°0′N 39°16′E	Red Sea	
16°0′N 40°3′E	Eritrea	Island of Nahaleg
16°0′N 40°5′E	Red Sea	
16°0′N 42°49′E	Yemen	
16°0′N 52°10′E	Indian Ocean	Arabian Sea
16°0′N 73°29′E	India	Maharashtra; Karnataka; Andhra Pradesh; Telangana
16°0′N 81°9′E	Indian Ocean	Bay of Bengal
16°0′N 94°13′E	Myanmar (Burma)	Irrawaddy River delta
16°0′N 95°41′E	Indian Ocean	Gulf of Martaban, Andaman Sea
16°0′N 97°35′E	Myanmar (Burma)	Thanbyuzayat Township
16°0′N 98°36′E	Thailand	
16°0′N 105°25′E	Laos	
16°0′N 107°27′E	Vietnam	Passing just south of Da Nang
16°0′N 108°16′E	South China Sea	Passing through the disputed Paracel Islands
16°0′N 119°45′E	Philippines	Island of Luzon
16°0′N 121°39′E	Pacific Ocean	Philippine Sea; Passing just south of the island of Farallon de Medinilla, Northern Mariana Islands into an unnamed part of the Ocean
16°0′N 97°50′W	Mexico	
16°0′N 95°24′W	Pacific Ocean	Gulf of Tehuantepec
16°0′N 93°59′W	Mexico	
16°0′N 91°46′W	Guatemala	
16°0′N 89°13′W	Belize	
16°0′N 88°54′W	Caribbean Sea	Passing just north of Punta de Manabique, Guatemala; Passing just south of the island of Útila, Honduras
16°0′N 85°58′W	Honduras	
16°0′N 85°53′W	Caribbean Sea	Passing just north of Cape Camarón, Honduras
16°0′N 61°44′W	France	Island of Basse-Terre, Guadeloupe
16°0′N 61°35′W	Atlantic Ocean	
16°0′N 61°17′W	France	Island of Marie-Galante, Guadeloupe
16°0′N 61°15′W	Atlantic Ocean	
16°0′N 22°55′W	Cape Verde	Island of Boa Vista
16°0′N 22°46′W	Atlantic Ocean	
16°0′N 16°30′W	Senegal	
16°0′N 13°22′W	Mauritania	
16°0′N 5°24′W	Mali	

== 17th parallel north ==
17th parallel north (interactive map)

The 17th parallel north is a circle of latitude that is 17 degrees north of the Earth's equatorial plane. It crosses Africa, Asia, the Indian Ocean, the Pacific Ocean, Central America, the Caribbean, and the Atlantic Ocean. The parallel is particularly significant in the history of Vietnam.

At this latitude the sun is visible for 13 hours, 9 minutes during the summer solstice and 11 hours, 7 minutes during the winter solstice.

=== Vietnam ===
The Seventeenth parallel (Vietnamese: vĩ tuyến 17) was the provisional military demarcation line between North and South Vietnam established by the Geneva Accords of 1954. The demarcation line did not exactly coincide with the 17th parallel but ran south of it, approximately along the Bến Hải River in Quảng Trị province to the village of Bo Ho Su and from there due west to the Laos–Vietnam border.

In 1976 the demarcation line was made irrelevant as Vietnam was unified after the surrender of the South Vietnamese government.

=== Around the world ===
Starting at the Prime Meridian and heading eastwards, the parallel 17° north passes through:

Coordinates	Country, territory or ocean	Notes
17°0′N 0°0′E	Mali	
17°0′N 4°14′E	Niger	
17°0′N 15°30′E	Chad	
17°0′N 24°0′E	Sudan	
17°0′N 37°0′E	Eritrea	
17°0′N 39°2′E	Indian Ocean	Red Sea
17°0′N 41°47′E	Saudi Arabia	Farasan Islands
17°0′N 41°53′E	Indian Ocean	Red Sea
17°0′N 42°33′E	Saudi Arabia	
17°0′N 43°10′E	Yemen	
17°0′N 46°57′E	Saudi Arabia	
17°0′N 47°23′E	Yemen	
17°0′N 52°57′E	Oman	
17°0′N 54°7′E	Indian Ocean	Arabian Sea
17°0′N 54°41′E	Oman	
17°0′N 54°59′E	Indian Ocean	Arabian Sea
17°0′N 73°17′E	India	Maharashtra; Karnataka; Andhra Pradesh; Telangana
17°0′N 82°17′E	Indian Ocean	Bay of Bengal
17°0′N 94°27′E	Myanmar (Burma)	Shwethaungyan Subtownship, Pathein District; Hlawga National Park, Mingaladon Township, Yangon
17°0′N 96°54′E	Indian Ocean	Gulf of Martaban
17°0′N 97°12′E	Myanmar (Burma)	Thaton Township, Mon State; Hlaingbwe Township, Kayin State
17°0′N 98°37′E	Thailand	
17°0′N 104°44′E	Laos	
17°0′N 106°26′E	Vietnam	
17°0′N 107°7′E	Pacific Ocean	South China Sea, passing through the disputed Paracel Islands
17°0′N 120°27′E	Philippines	Island of Luzon
17°0′N 122°29′E	Pacific Ocean	Philippine Sea; Passing between the islands of Guguan and Sarigan, Northern Mariana Islands into an unnamed part of the Ocean
17°0′N 100°17′W	Mexico	
17°0′N 91°7′W	Guatemala	
17°0′N 89°9′W	Belize	
17°0′N 88°13′W	Atlantic Ocean	Caribbean Sea, passing just south of the island of Nevis, Saint Kitts and Nevis; Passing just north of the island of Redonda, Antigua and Barbuda
17°0′N 61°46′W	Antigua and Barbuda	Island of Antigua
17°0′N 61°44′W	Atlantic Ocean	
17°0′N 25°19′W	Cape Verde	Santo Antão island
17°0′N 25°6′W	Atlantic Ocean	
17°0′N 16°17′W	Mauritania	
17°0′N 5°39′W	Mali	

== 18th parallel north ==
18th parallel north (interactive map)

The 18th parallel north is a circle of latitude that is 18 degrees north of the Earth's equatorial plane. It crosses Africa, Asia, the Indian Ocean, the Pacific Ocean, Central America, the Caribbean, and the Atlantic Ocean.

At this latitude the sun is visible for 13 hours, 13 minutes during the summer solstice and 11 hours, 3 minutes during the winter solstice.

=== Around the world ===
Starting at the Prime Meridian and heading eastwards, the parallel 18° north passes through:

Coordinates	Country, territory or sea	Notes
18°0′N 0°0′E	Mali	
18°0′N 4°14′E	Niger	
18°0′N 15°33′E	Chad	
18°0′N 24°0′E	Sudan	
18°0′N 38°34′E	Eritrea	For about 1 km
18°0′N 38°34′E	Indian Ocean	Red Sea
18°0′N 41°38′E	Saudi Arabia	
18°0′N 48°7′E	Yemen	
18°0′N 52°28′E	Oman	
18°0′N 56°24′E	Indian Ocean	Arabian Sea
18°0′N 73°1′E	India	Maharashtra; Karnataka; Andhra Pradesh; Chhattisgarh; Orissa; Telangana
18°0′N 83°34′E	Indian Ocean	Bay of Bengal
18°0′N 94°28′E	Myanmar (Burma)	Kyeintali
18°0′N 97°44′E	Thailand	
18°0′N 101°1′E	Laos	
18°0′N 101°45′E	Thailand	
18°0′N 102°24′E	Laos	Passing just north of Vientiane
18°0′N 103°3′E	Thailand	
18°0′N 104°12′E	Laos	
18°0′N 105°37′E	Vietnam	
18°0′N 106°28′E	Pacific Ocean	Passing just south of the island of Hainan, China, South China Sea
18°0′N 120°30′E	Philippines	Island of Luzon
18°0′N 122°11′E	Pacific Ocean	Philippine Sea; Passing just south of Pagan Island, Northern Mariana Islands into an unnamed part of the Ocean
18°0′N 102°27′W	Mexico	
18°0′N 88°46′W	Belize	
18°0′N 88°8′W	Atlantic Ocean	Chetumal Bay
18°0′N 87°58′W	Belize	Ambergris Caye
18°0′N 87°55′W	Atlantic Ocean	Caribbean Sea
18°0′N 77°50′W	Jamaica	Passing through Kingston
18°0′N 76°15′W	Atlantic Ocean	Passing just south of the Tiburon Peninsula, Haiti, Caribbean Sea
18°0′N 71°42′W	Dominican Republic	
18°0′N 71°9′W	Atlantic Ocean	Caribbean Sea; Passing just south of Saona Island, Dominican Republic; Passing just south of Isla Mona, Puerto Rico
18°0′N 67°12′W	Puerto Rico	
18°0′N 65°52′W	Atlantic Ocean	Caribbean Sea; Passing just south of Isla de Vieques, Puerto Rico; Passing between the islands of St. Thomas and St. Croix, United States Virgin Islands; Passing just south of Sint Maarten
18°0′N 63°0′W	Atlantic Ocean	Passing just north of Saint Barthélemy
18°0′N 16°1′W	Mauritania	Passing just south of Nouakchott
18°0′N 5°46′W	Mali	

== 19th parallel north ==
19th parallel north (interactive map)

The 19th parallel north is a circle of latitude that is 19 degrees north of the Earth's equatorial plane. It crosses Africa, Asia, the Indian Ocean, the Pacific Ocean, North America, the Caribbean, and the Atlantic Ocean.

At this latitude the sun is visible for 13 hours, 17 minutes during the summer solstice and 10 hours, 59 minutes during the winter solstice.

=== Around the world ===
Starting at the Prime Meridian and heading eastwards, the parallel 19° north passes through:

Coordinates	Country, territory or sea	Notes
19°0′N 0°0′E	Mali	
19°0′N 3°16′E	Algeria	
19°0′N 3°32′E	Mali	
19°0′N 4°14′E	Niger	
19°0′N 15°38′E	Chad	
19°0′N 24°0′E	Sudan	
19°0′N 37°24′E	Indian Ocean	Red Sea
19°0′N 41°9′E	Saudi Arabia	The parallel touches on the northernmost point of Yemen at the border with Oman
19°0′N 52°0′E	Oman	
19°0′N 57°50′E	Indian Ocean	Arabian Sea
19°0′N 72°49′E	India	Maharashtra - passing through Mumbai; Telangana; Andhra PradeshChhattisgarh; Orissa
19°0′N 84°43′E	Indian Ocean	Bay of Bengal
19°0′N 93°43′E	Myanmar (Burma)	Ramree Island; Taungoo Township
19°0′N 97°44′E	Thailand	
19°0′N 101°19′E	Laos	
19°0′N 104°26′E	Vietnam	For about 5 km
19°0′N 104°29′E	Laos	For about 2 km
19°0′N 104°30′E	Vietnam	
19°0′N 105°37′E	Pacific Ocean	Gulf of Tonkin, South China Sea
19°0′N 108°39′E	China	Island of Hainan
19°0′N 110°31′E	Pacific Ocean	Passing between Dalupiri Island and Fuga Island, Philippines, South China Sea
19°0′N 121°54′E	Philippines	Camiguin Island
19°0′N 121°57′E	Pacific Ocean	Philippine Sea; Passing just north of Agrihan island, Northern Mariana Islands into an unnamed part of the Ocean; Passing just south of Wake Island, United States Minor Outlying Islands
19°0′N 155°47′W	United States	Hawaii island, Hawaii
19°0′N 155°35′W	Pacific Ocean	
19°0′N 112°4′W	Mexico	Roca Partida, Revillagigedo Islands
19°0′N 112°3′W	Pacific Ocean	Passing just north of Socorro Island, Revillagigedo Islands, Mexico
19°0′N 104°17′W	Mexico	
19°0′N 95°58′W	Atlantic Ocean	Bay of Campeche, Gulf of Mexico
19°0′N 91°11′W	Mexico	Yucatán Peninsula
19°0′N 87°36′W	Atlantic Ocean	Caribbean Sea Passing just north of Gonâve Island, Haiti
19°0′N 72°45′W	Haiti	
19°0′N 70°40′W	Dominican Republic	
19°0′N 68°52′W	Atlantic Ocean	Passing just north of Anegada island, British Virgin Islands
19°0′N 16°13′W	Mauritania	
19°0′N 5°53′W	Mali	

== 20th parallel north ==
20th parallel north (interactive map)

In Africa, the parallel defines part of the border between Libya and Sudan.

The 20th parallel north is a circle of latitude that is 20 degrees north of the Earth's equatorial plane. It crosses Africa, Asia, the Indian Ocean, the Pacific Ocean, North America, the Caribbean, and the Atlantic Ocean.

The parallel defines part of the border between Libya and Sudan. Within Sudan it defines the border between the Northern and North Darfur states.

At this latitude the sun is visible for 13 hours, 21 minutes during the summer solstice and 10 hours, 55 minutes during the winter solstice.

On 21 June, the maximum altitude of the sun is 93.44 degrees and 46.56 degrees on 21 December. In this case an angle larger than 90° means that the culmination takes place at a maximum altitude of 86.56 degrees in the opposite cardinal direction. In the northern torrid zone, the Sun remains in the south during winter, but can reach over the zenith to the north in midsummer.

=== Around the world ===
Starting at the Prime Meridian and heading eastwards, the parallel 20° north passes through:

Coordinates	Country, territory or sea	Notes
20°0′N 0°0′E	Mali	
20°0′N 2°43′E	Algeria	
20°0′N 6°27′E	Niger	
20°0′N 15°47′E	Chad	
20°0′N 23°3′E	Libya	
20°0′N 24°0′E	Libya / Sudan border	
20°0′N 25°0′E	Sudan	The parallel defines the border between the Northern and North Darfur states
20°0′N 37°11′E	Indian Ocean	Red Sea
20°0′N 40°28′E	Saudi Arabia	
20°0′N 55°0′E	Oman	
20°0′N 57°48′E	Indian Ocean	Arabian Sea - Passing just south of Masirah Island, Oman
20°0′N 72°43′E	India	Maharashtra; Chhattisgarh; Odisha; Chhattisgarh; Odisha
20°0′N 86°23′E	Indian Ocean	Bay of Bengal
20°0′N 92°57′E	Myanmar (Burma)	Taungdwingyi, Magway Region
20°0′N 99°3′E	Thailand	
20°0′N 100°32′E	Laos	
20°0′N 104°58′E	Vietnam	
20°0′N 106°11′E	Pacific Ocean	Gulf of Tonkin, South China Sea
20°0′N 110°8′E	China	Island of Hainan — passing just south of Haikou
20°0′N 110°56′E	Pacific Ocean	South China Sea
20°0′N 122°0′E	Pacific Ocean	Philippine Sea: Passing between the Batanes and Babuyan islands at the Balintang Channel, Philippines; Passing just south of the Maug Islands, Northern Mariana Islands; into an unnamed part of the Ocean
20°0′N 155°50′W	United States	Big Island, Hawaii
20°0′N 155°15′W	Pacific Ocean	
20°0′N 105°31′W	Mexico	Jalisco; Michoacan; Guanajuato; Querétaro; Mexico State; Hidalgo; Puebla; Veracruz
20°0′N 96°33′W	Gulf of Mexico	Bay of Campeche
20°0′N 90°28′W	Mexico	Campeche; Yucatán; Quintana Roo
20°0′N 87°28′W	Caribbean Sea	
20°0′N 77°38′W	Cuba	
20°0′N 74°52′W	Caribbean Sea	Windward Passage
20°0′N 72°43′W	Haiti	Island of Tortuga
20°0′N 74°52′W	Atlantic Ocean	Passing just north of the island of Hispaniola, Dominican Republic
20°0′N 16°14′W	Mauritania	
20°0′N 5°59′W	Mali	

== See also ==
- Circles of latitude between the 10th parallel north and the 15th parallel north
- Circles of latitude between the 20th parallel north and the 25th parallel north
- 17th Parallel: Vietnam in War, 1968 documentary film
- 38th parallel north, similar line once dividing North and South Korea
