= Izu–Bonin–Mariana arc =

Convergent boundary in Micronesia

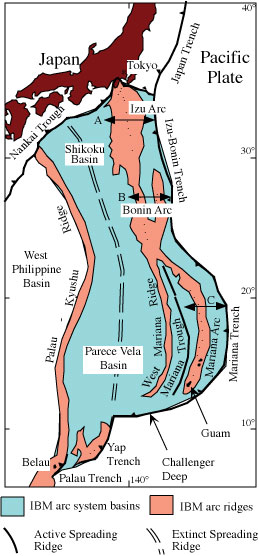
The IBM arc system in the Western Pacific. Lines with arrows show approximate locations of E–W profiles across arc.

The Izu–Bonin–Mariana (IBM) arc system is a tectonic plate convergent boundary in Micronesia. The IBM arc system extends over 2,800 km (1,700 mi) south from Tokyo, Japan, to beyond Guam, and includes the Izu Islands, the Bonin Islands, and the Mariana Islands; much more of the IBM arc system is submerged below sea level. The IBM arc system lies along the eastern margin of the Philippine Sea plate in the Western Pacific Ocean. It is the site of the deepest gash in Earth's solid surface, the Challenger Deep in the Mariana Trench.

The IBM arc system formed as a result of subduction of the western Pacific plate. The IBM arc system now subducts mid-Jurassic to Early Cretaceous lithosphere, with younger lithosphere in the north and older lithosphere in the south, including the oldest (~170 million years old, or Ma) oceanic crust. Subduction rates vary from ~2 cm (1 inch) per year in the south to 6 cm (~2.5 inches) in the north.

The volcanic islands that comprise these island arcs are thought to have been formed from the release of volatiles (steam from trapped water, and other gases) being released from the subducted plate, as it reached sufficient depth for the temperature to cause release of these materials. The associated trenches are formed as the oldest (most western) part of the Pacific plate crust increases in density with age, and because of this process finally reaches its lowest point just as it subducts under the crust to the west of it.

The IBM arc system is an excellent example of an intra-oceanic convergent margin (IOCM). IOCMs are built on oceanic crust and contrast fundamentally with island arcs built on continental crust, such as Japan or the Andes. Because IOCM crust is thinner, denser, and more refractory than that beneath Andean-type margins, study of IOCM melts and fluids allows more confident assessment of mantle-to-crust fluxes and processes than is possible for Andean-type convergent margins. Because IOCMs are far removed from continents they are not affected by the large volume of alluvial and glacial sediments. The consequent thin sedimentary cover makes it much easier to study arc infrastructure and determine the mass and composition of subducted sediments. Active hydrothermal systems found on the submarine parts of IOCMs give us a chance to study how many of Earth's important ore deposits formed.

== Boundaries of IBM arc system ==
Crust and lithosphere produced by the IBM arc system during its ~50 Ma history are found today as far west as the Kyushu–Palau Ridge (just east of the West Philippine Sea Basin), up to 1,000 km (620 mi) from the present IBM trench. The IBM arc system is the expression of the operation of a subduction zone and this defines its vertical extent. The northern boundary of the IBM arc system follows the Nankai Trough northeastward and onto southern Honshū, joining up with a complex system of thrusts that continue offshore eastward to the Japan Trench. The intersection of the IBM, Japan, and Sagami trenches at the Boso triple junction, one of only two trench–trench–trench triple junctions on Earth. The IBM arc system is bounded on the east by a very deep trench, which ranges from almost 11 km (6.8 mi) deep in the Challenger Deep to less than {3 km (1.9 mi) where the Ogasawara Plateau enters the trench. The southern boundary is found where the IBM Trench meets the Kyushu–Palau Ridge near Belau. So defined, the IBM arc system spans over 25° of latitude, from 11°N to 35°20’N.

== Plate motions ==
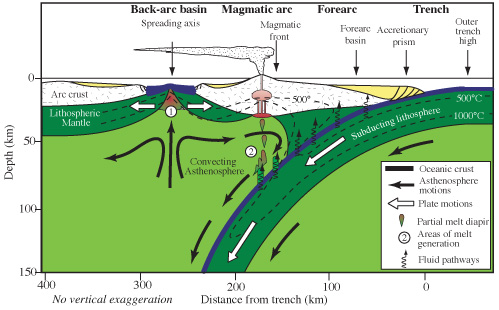
Cross-section through the shallow part of a subduction zone showing the relative positions of an active magmatic arc and back-arc basin, such as the southern part of the Izu–Bonin–Mariana arc.

The IBM arc system can be regarded as part of the Philippine Sea plate, at least to the first approximation. Although the IBM arc deforms internally and to the south a small plate known as the Mariana plate is separated from the Philippine Sea plate by a spreading ridge in the Mariana Trough – it is still useful to discuss approximate rates and directions of the Philippine Sea plate with its lithospheric neighbors, because these define, to a first order, how rapidly and along what streamlines material is fed into the subduction process. The Philippine Sea plate (PH) has four neighboring plates: Pacific (PA), Eurasian (EU), North American (NA), and Caroline (CR). There is minor relative motion between PH and CR; furthermore, CR does not feed the IBM subduction process, so it is not discussed further. The North American plate includes northern Japan, but relative motion between it and Eurasia is sufficiently small that the relative motion between PH and EU explains the process. The Euler pole for PH-PA as inferred from the NUVEL-1A model for current plate motions, lies about 8°N 137.3°E, near the southern end of the Philippine Sea Plate. PA rotates around this pole CCW ~1°/Ma with respect to PH. This means that relative to the southernmost IBM, PA is moving NW and being subducted at about 20–30 mm (0.79–1.18 in)/year, whereas relative to the northernmost IBM, PA is moving WNW and twice as fast. At the south end of IBM, there is almost no convergence between the Caroline plate and the Philippine Sea plate.

The IBM arc is not experiencing trench 'roll-back', that is, the migration of the oceanic trench towards the ocean. The trench is moving towards Eurasia, although a strongly extensional regime is maintained in the IBM arc system because of rapid PH-EU convergence. The nearly vertical orientation of the subducted plate beneath southern IBM exerts a strong "sea-anchor" force that strongly resists its lateral motion. Back-arc basin spreading is thought to be due to the combined effects of the sea-anchor force and rapid PH-EU convergence. Because of these different spreading rates caused by subducting slab pull, this might allow for sea floor spreading and magma upwelling to form new oceanic crust near the leading edges of these subduction zones.

The obliquity of convergence between PA and the IBM arc system change markedly along the IBM arc system. Plate convergence inferred from earthquake slip vectors is nearly strike-slip in the northernmost Marianas, adjacent to and south of the northern terminus of the Mariana Trough, where the arc has been 'bowed-out' by back-arc basin opening, resulting in a trench which strikes approximately parallel to the convergence vectors. Convergence is strongly oblique for most of the Mariana arc system but is more nearly orthogonal for the southernmost Marianas and most of the Izu–Bonin segments. In 1996 it was noted that the arc-parallel slip rate in the forearc reaches a maximum of 30 mm (1.2 in)/year in the northern Marianas. This is fast enough to have produced geologically significant effects, such as unroofing of high-grade metamorphic rocks, and provides one explanation for why the forearc in southern IBM is tectonically more active than that in northern IBM.

== Geologic history of the IBM arc system ==
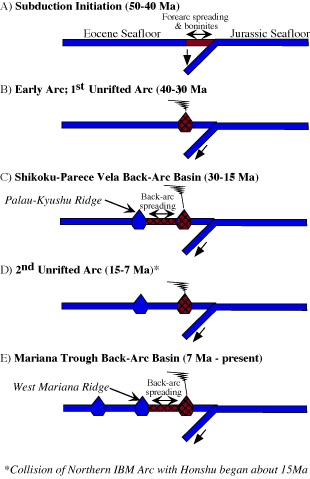
Simplified tectonic history of the IBM arc system, viewed along E-W profiles. Red corresponds to regions of magmatic activity, blue is magmatically extinct.

The evolution of the IBM arc system is among the best known of any convergent margin. Because IBM has always been an arc system under strong extension, its components encompass a broad area, from the Palau–Kyushu Ridge to the IBM trench (see first-right figure). In general, the oldest components are farthest west, but a complete record of evolution is preserved in the forearc. The IBM subduction zone began as part of a hemispheric-scale foundering of old, dense lithosphere in the Western Pacific. The beginning of true subduction localized the magmatic arc close to its present position, about 200 km (120 mi) away from the trench, and allowed the sub-forearc mantle to stabilize and cool. The arc stabilized until about 30 Ma, when it began to rift to form the Parece Vela Basin. Spreading also began in the northernmost part of the IBM arc about 25 Ma and propagated south to form the Shikoku Basin. Parece Vela and Shikoku basin spreading systems met about 20 Ma and the combined Parece Vela Basin-Shikioku Basin continued widening until about 15 Ma, ultimately producing Earth's largest back-arc basin. The arc was disrupted during rifting but began to build again as a distinct magmatic system once seafloor spreading began. Arc volcanism, especially explosive volcanism, waned during much of this episode, with a resurgence beginning about 20 Ma in the south and about 17 Ma in the north. Tephra from northern and southern IBM show that strong compositional differences observed for the modern arc have existed over most of the arc's history, with northern IBM being more depleted and southern IBM being relatively enriched. About 15 Ma, the northernmost IBM began to collide with Honshū, probably as a result of new subduction along the Nankai Trough.

A new episode of rifting to form the Mariana Trough back-arc basin began sometime after 10 Ma, with seafloor spreading beginning about 3–4 Ma. Because disruption of the arc is the first stage in forming any back-arc basin, the present Mariana arc volcanoes cannot be older than 3–4 Ma but the Izu–Bonin volcanoes could be as old as ~25 Ma. The Izu interarc rifts began to form about 2 Ma.

== IBM arc system components ==
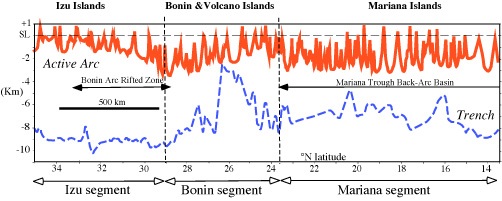
Simplified bathymetric and topographic profile along the IBM magmatic arc

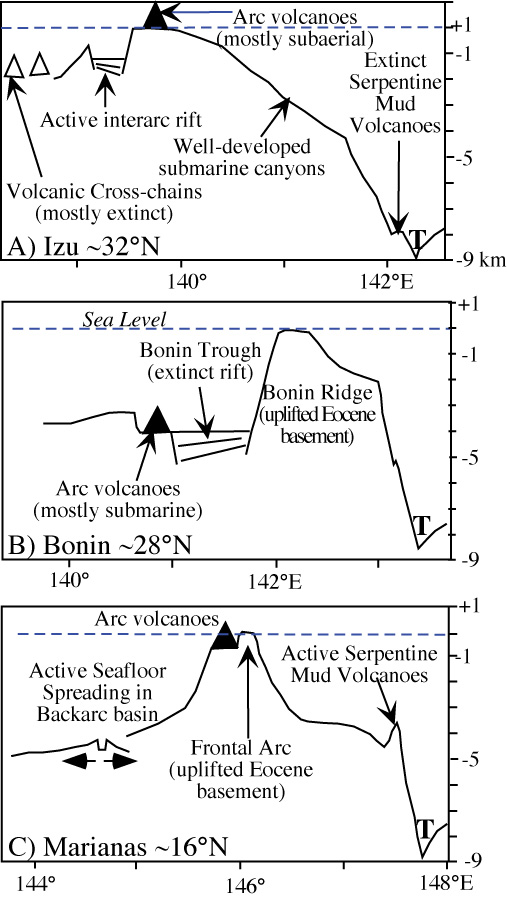
Simplified bathymetric profiles across the IBM arc system, approximate locations shown in first figure. T indicates position of trench.

The three segments of IBM (figure to right) do not correspond to variations on the incoming plate. Boundaries are defined by the Sofugan Tectonic Line (~29°30’N) separating the Izu and Bonin segments, and by the northern end of the Mariana Trough back-arc basin (~23°N), that defines the boundary between the Bonin and Mariana segments. Forearc, active arc, and back arc are expressed differently on either side of these boundaries (see figure below).

The forearc is that part of the arc system between the trench and the magmatic front of the arc and includes uplifted sectors of the forearc situated near the magmatic front, sometimes called the 'frontal arc'. The IBM forearc from Guam to Japan is about 200 km (120 mi) wide. Uplifted portions of the forearc, composed of Eocene igneous basement surmounted by reef terraces of Eocene and younger age, produce the island chain from Guam north to Ferdinand de Medinilla in the Marianas. Similarly, the Bonin or Ogasawara Islands are mostly composed of Eocene igneous rocks. There is no accretionary prism associated with the IBM forearc or trench.

The magmatic axis of the arc is well defined from Honshū to Guam. This 'magmatic arc' is often submarine, with volcanoes built on a submarine platform that lies between 1 and 4 km (0.62 and 2.49 mi) water depth. Volcanic islands are common in the Izu segment, including O-shima, Hachijojima, and Miyakejima. The Izu segment farther south also contains several submarine felsic calderas. The Izu arc segment is also punctuated by inter-arc rifts. The Bonin segment to the south of the Sofugan Tectonic Line contains mostly submarine volcanoes and also some that rise slightly above sealevel, such as Nishino-shima. The Bonin segment is characterized by a deep basin, the Ogasawara Trough, between the magmatic arc and the Bonin Islands forearc uplift. The highest elevations in the IBM arc (not including the Izu Peninsula, where IBM comes onshore in Japan) are found in the southern part of the Bonin segment, where the extinct volcanic islands of Minami Iwo Jima and Kita Iwo Jima rise to almost 1000 m above sealevel. The bathymetric high associated with magmatic arc of the Izu and Bonin segments is often referred to as the Shichito Ridge in Japanese publications, and the Bonins are often referred to as the Ogasawara Islands. Volcanoes erupting lavas of unusual composition – the shoshonitic province – are found in the transition between the Bonin and Mariana arc segments, including Iwo Jima. The magmatic arc in the Marianas is submarine to the north of Uracas, south of which the Mariana arc includes volcanic islands (from north to south): Asuncion, Maug, Agrigan, Pagan, Alamagan, Guguan, Sarigan, and Anatahan. Mariana volcanoes again becomes submarine south of Anatahan.

The back-arc regions of the three segments are quite different. The Izu segment is marked by several volcanic cross-chains which extend SW away from the magmatic front. The magmatically starved Bonin arc segment has no back-arc basin, inter-arc rift, or rear-arc cross chains. The Mariana segment is characterized by an actively spreading back arc basin known as the Mariana Trough. The Mariana Trough shows marked variations along strike, with seafloor spreading south of 19°15’ and rifting farther north.

The IBM arc system southwest of Guam is markedly different from the region to the north. The forearc region is very narrow and the intersection of backarc basin spreading axis with the arc magmatic systems is complex.

=== Behavior and composition of the Western Pacific plate ===
Everything on the Pacific plate that enters the IBM trench is subducted. The next section discusses some modifications of the lithosphere just prior to its descent and the age and composition of oceanic crust and sediments on the Pacific plate adjacent to the trench. In addition to subducted sediments and crust of the Pacific plate, there is also a very substantial volume of material from the overriding IBM forearc that is lost to the subduction zone by tectonic erosion.

== IBM Trench and outer trench swell ==
Geologic relations around the Mariana Trench. Upper left map shows regional setting. Dashed box in regional map (upper left) shows area of detail shown in upper right map. Upper right map shows features up to about 100 km (62 mi) on either side of central Mariana Trench. Dashed line shows location of multichannel seismic reflection line 53-53, which is interpreted in lower cross section. Flexure-related faults are outlined in black. Lower figure is a cross-section of the shallow Mariana Subduction Zone along MCS Line 53–54 with numerically annotated features.

The oceanic trench and the associated outer trench swell mark where Pacific Plate begins its descent into the IBM Subduction Zone. The IBM trench is where the Pacific Plate lithosphere begins to sink. The IBM trench is devoid of any significant sediment fill; the ~400 m (1,300 ft) or so thickness of sediments is completely subducted with the downgoing plate. The IBM outer trench swell rises to about 300 m (980 ft) above the surrounding seafloor just before the trench. The lithosphere that is about to descend into a trench starts to bend just outboard of the trench; the seafloor is elevated into a broad swell that is a few hundred meters high and referred to as the "outer trench bulge" or "outer trench rise". The about-to-be subducted plate is highly faulted, allowing seawater to penetrate into the plate interior, where hydration of mantle peridotite may generate serpentinite. Serpentinite thus generated may carry water deep into the mantle as a result of subduction.

== Geology and composition of the westernmost Pacific plate ==
The Pacific plate subducts in the IBM trench, so understanding what is subducted beneath IBM requires understanding the history of the western Pacific. The IBM arc system subducts mid-Jurassic to Early Cretaceous lithosphere, with younger lithosphere in the north and older lithosphere in the south. It is not possible to directly know the composition of subducted materials presently being processed by the IBM subduction process – what is now 130 km (81 mi) deep in the subduction zone entered the trench 4 – 10 million years ago. However, the composition of the western Pacific seafloor-oceanic crust – sediments, crust, and mantle lithosphere – varies sufficiently systematically that, what is now being processed is suggested by studying what lies on the seafloor east of the IBM trench.

The Pacific plate seafloor east of the IBM arc system can be subdivided into a northern portion that is bathymetrically 'smooth' and a southern portion that is bathymetrically rugged, separated by the Ogasawara Plateau. These large-scale variations mark distinct geologic histories to the north and south. The featureless north is dominated by the Nadezhda Basin. In the south, crude alignments of seamounts, atolls, and islands define three great, WNW-ESE trending chains: the Marcus Island–Wake Island-Ogasawara Plateau, the Magellan Seamounts Chain, and the Caroline Islands Ridge. The first two chains formed by off-ridge volcanism during Cretaceous time, whereas the Caroline Islands chain formed over the past 20 million years. Two important basins lie between these chains: the Pigafetta Basin lies between the Marcus-Wake and Magellan chains, and the East Mariana Basin lies between the Magellan and Caroline chains.

Simplified geologic and magnetic map of the western Pacific. Relative motion of the Pacific plate with respect to the Philippine Sea plate is shown with arrows, numbers correspond to velocities (mm/year). Numbers with asterisks represent scientific drilling sites, especially Integrated Ocean Drilling Program and Deep Sea Drilling Program drillsites.

The age of Western Pacific seafloor has been interpreted from seafloor magnetic anomalies correlated to the geomagnetic reversal timescale, and confirmed by Ocean Drilling Program scientific drilling. Three major sets of magnetic anomalies have been identified in the area of interest. Each of these lineation sets comprises M-series (mid-Jurassic to mid-Cretaceous) magnetic anomalies that are essentially "growth rings" of the Pacific plate. These anomaly sets indicate that the small, roughly triangular Pacific plate grew by spreading along three ridges. The oldest identifiable lineations are M33 to M35, or perhaps even M38. It is difficult to say how old these lineations and the older crust might be; the oldest magnetic lineations for which ages have been assigned are M29 (157 Ma). Magnetic lineations as old as M29 are not known from other oceans, and the area in the Western Pacific that lies inside the M29 lineation – that is, crust older than M29 – is on the order of 318 km^{2} (123 sq mi), about a third of the size of the United States. ODP site 801 lies on seafloor that is considerably older than M29 and the MORB basement there yields Ar-Ar ages of 167±5 Ma. The oldest sediments at site 801C are middle Jurassic, Callovian or latest Bathonian (~162 Ma).

Seafloor spreading in the Pacific during the Cretaceous evolved from a more E-W 'Tethyan' orientation to the modern N-S trend. This occurred during mid-Cretaceous time, a ~35–40 Ma interval characterized by a lack of magnetic reversals known as the Cretaceous Superchron or Quiet Zone. Subsequently, the location of N-S trending spreading ridges relative to the Pacific Basin migrated progressively to the east throughout Cretaceous and Tertiary time, resulting in the present marked asymmetry of the Pacific, with very young seafloor in the Eastern Pacific and very old seafloor in the Western Pacific.

Sediments being delivered to the IBM trench are not thick considering that this is some of Earth's oldest seafloor. Away from seamounts, the pelagic sequence is dominated by chert and pelagic clay, with little carbonate. Carbonates are important near guyots, common in the southern part of the region. Cenozoic sediments are unimportant except for volcanic ash and Asian loess deposited adjacent to Japan and carbonate sediments associated with the relatively shallow Caroline Ridge and Caroline plate. Strong seafloor currents are probably responsible for this erosion or non-deposition.

The compositions of sediments being subducted beneath the northern and southern parts of the IBM arc are significantly different, because of the Cretaceous off-ridge volcanic succession in the south that is missing in the north. Lavas and volcaniclastics associated with an intense episode of intraplate volcanism correspond in time closely to the Cretaceous Superchron. Off-ridge volcanism became increasingly important approaching the Ontong-Java Plateau. There are 100–400 m (330–1,310 ft) thick tholeiitic sills in the East Mariana Basin and Pigafetta Basin, and at least 650 m (2,130 ft) of tholeiitic flows and sills in the Nauru Basin, near ODP Site 462. It has been suggested that this province may reflect the formation of a mid-Cretaceous spreading system in the Nauru and East Mariana basins. Farther north, deposits related to this episode consist of thick sequences of Aptian–Albian volcaniclastic turbidites shed from emerging volcanic islands, such as preserved at DSDP site 585 and ODP sites 800 and 801. A few hundred meters of volcaniclastic deposits probably characterizes the sedimentary succession in and around the East Mariana and Pigafetta basins. Farther north, at DSDP sites 196 and 307 and ODP site 1149, there is little evidence of mid-Cretaceous volcanic activity. It appears that the Aptian-Albian volcanic episode was largely restricted to the region south of present 20°N latitude. Paleomagnetic and plate kinematic considerations place this broad region of off-ridge volcanism in the present vicinity of Polynesia, where today off-ridge volcanism, shallow bathymetry, and thin lithosphere is known as the South Pacific superswell.

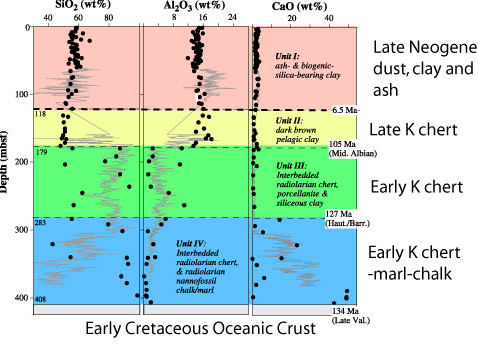
Sediment cored at Ocean Drilling Program Site 1149 (see previous figure for location). Far right gives lithology and age, 3 columns show vertical variations of Calcium, Silicon, and Aluminum, indicators of relative carbonate, chert, and clay or ash. Modified from Plank et al. (2006).

The figure above shows the typical sediments drilled at Ocean Drilling Program site 1149, east of the Izu–Bonin segment. The sediments drilled at ODP site 1149 are about 400 m (1,300 ft) thick and are as old as 134 million years. The sedimentary section is a typical pelagic stratigraphy, accumulated mostly in the Cretaceous but also in the last 7 million years (late Neogene) built on a basement of Early Cretaceous oceanic crust. The lowermost portion is carbonate and chert, the next layer is very chert-rich, the third layer is clay-rich. This is followed by a long depositional hiatus before sedimentation resumes ~6.5 Ma (Late Miocene), with deposition of volcanic ash, clay, and windblown dust. The stratigraphy east of the Mariana segment differs from that being subducted beneath the Izu–Bonin segment in having a much greater abundance of Early Cretaceous intra-plate volcanics and flood basalts.

About 470 m (1,540 ft) of oceanic crust was penetrated at ODP site 801C during Legs 129 and 185. These are typical mid-ocean ridge basalts that were affected by low-temperature hydrothermal alteration. This crust is overlain by a 3 m thick, bright yellow hydrothermal deposit and about 60 m (200 ft) of alkali olivine basalt, 157.4±0.5 Ma old.

=== Geophysics of the subducted slab and mantle ===
The deep structure of the IBM system has been imaged using a variety of geophysical techniques. This section provides an overview of these data, including a discussion of mantle structure at depths >200 km (120 mi).

== Seismicity ==
Spatial patterns of seismicity are essential for locating and understanding the morphology and rheology of subducting lithospheric slabs, and this is particularly true for the IBM Wadati–Benioff zone (WBZ). The most important features of the IBM WBZ were first outlined in 1969. This study detected a zone of deep earthquakes beneath the southern Marianas and provided some of the first constraints on the deep, vertical nature of subducting Pacific lithosphere beneath southern IBM. It also found a region of reduced shallow seismicity (≤70 km (43 mi)) and an absence of deep (≥300 km (190 mi)) events beneath the Volcano Islands adjacent to the junction of the Izu Bonin and Mariana trenches, where the trench trends nearly parallel to the convergence vector.

Map view of bathymetry and seismicity in the IBM subduction zone using the earthquake catalog of Engdahl, van der Hilst & Buland 1998. Circles denote epicentral locations; lighter circles represent shallower events, darker circles represent deeper events. Black lines denote cross sectional areas depicted in 6 profiles on right, organized from N to S. Black circles represent hypocentral locations in volume ~60 km (37 mi) to each side of the lines shown on the map at left. Large variations in slab dip and maximum depth of seismicity are apparent. Distance along each section is measured from the magmatic arc. A) Northern Izu–Bonin region. Slab dip is ~45°; seismicity tapers off from ~175 km (109 mi) to ~300 km (190 mi) depth but increases around 400 km (250 mi), and terminates at ~475 km (295 mi) deep. B) Central Izu Bonin region. Slab dip is nearly vertical; seismicity tapers off from ~100 km (62 mi) to ~325 km (202 mi) but increases in rate and extends horizontally around 500 km (310 mi), and terminates at ~550 km (340 mi). C) Southern Izu Bonin region. Slab dip is ~50°; seismicity is continuous to ~200 km (120 mi), but a very few anomalous events are evident down to ~600 km (370 mi). D) Northern Mariana region. Slab dip is ~60°; seismicity is continuous to ~375 km (233 mi) and terminates at ~400 km (250 mi), but a very few anomalous events are evident down to ~600 km (370 mi). E) Central Mariana region. Slab dip is vertical; seismicity tapers off slightly between ~275 km (171 mi) and ~575 km (357 mi), but is essentially continuous. A pocket of deep events around 600 km (370 mi) exists, as well as a single deep event at 680 km (420 mi). F) Southern Mariana region. Slab dip is ~55°; seismicity is continuous to ~225 km (140 mi), with an anomalous event at 375 km (233 mi). (Note: Figure courtesy of Dr. Matt Fouch, Arizona State University)

Engdahl, van der Hilst & Buland 1998 provided an earthquake catalog containing improved locations (Figure 10). This data set shows that, beneath northern IBM, the dip of the WBZ steepens smoothly from ~40° to ~80° southwards, and seismicity diminishes between depths of ~150 km (93 mi) and ~300 km (190 mi) (Figures 11a c). The subducted slab beneath central IBM (near 25°N; Fig. 11c) is delineated by reduced seismic activity that nevertheless defines a more vertical orientation that persists southward (Figures 11d f). Deep earthquakes, here defined as seismic events ≥300 km (190 mi) deep, are common beneath parts of the IBM arc system (Figures 10, 11). Deep events in the IBM system are less frequent than for most other subduction zones with deep seismicity, such as Tonga/Fiji/Kermadec and South America. Beneath northern IBM, deep seismicity extends southward to ~27.5°N, and a small pocket of events between 275 km (171 mi) and 325 km (202 mi) depth exists at ~22°N. There is narrow band of deep earthquakes beneath southern IBM between ~21°N and ~17°N, but south of this there are extremely few deep events. Although early studies assumed that seismicity demarcated the upper boundary of the slab, more recent evidence has shown that many of these earthquakes occur within the slab. For instance, a study by Nakamura et al. 1998 showed that a region of events beneath northernmost IBM region occur ~20 km (12 mi) beneath the top of the subducting plate. They propose that transformational faulting, which occurs when metastable olivine changes to a more compact spinel structure, produces this zone of seismicity. Indeed, the faulting mechanism for deep earthquakes is a debated topic, and has yet to be resolved.

Double seismic zones (DSZs) have been detected in several parts of the IBM subduction zone, but their locations within the slab as well as interpretations for their existence vary dramatically. Beneath southern IBM, is a DSZ lying 80 km (50 mi) and 120 km (75 mi) deep, with the two zones separated by 30 to 35 km (19 to 22 mi). Earthquake focal mechanisms indicate that the upper zone, where most events occur, is in downdip compression, while the lower zone is in downdip extension. This DSZ is located at a depth where the curvature of slab is greatest; at greater depths it unbends into a more planar donfiguration. It has been suggested that unbending or thermal stresses in the upper 150 km (93 mi) of the slab may the primary cause of the seismicity. For the northern IBM, a later refined earthquake relocation scheme detected a DSZ between depths of 300 km (190 mi) and 400 km (250 mi), which also had a spacing of 30 to 35 km (19 to 22 mi) between the upper and lower zones. This was interpreted from the S to P converted phases and thermal modeling to propose that the DSZ results from transformational faulting of a metastable olivine wedge in the slab. Other work suggests that compositional variations in the subducting slab may also contribute to double seismic zone, or that DSZs represent the locus of serpentine dehydration in the slab.

=== Mariana arc volcanism and hydrothermal activity ===
Interactive map of Mariana volcanic arc. (Note: As of 2026 only some of seamounts have official names.)
Legend
- Key for the volcanoes shown:
- Seamounts
- Seamounts with recorded eruptions
- Islands
- Islands with recorded eruptions
- Clicking on the rectangle icon enables full window and mouse-over with volcano name/wikilink and image.

== Arc volcanism ==
There are 76 volcanic edifices along 1,370 km (850 mi) of the Mariana arc, grouped into 60 volcanic centers, of which at least 26 (20 submarine) are hydrothermally or volcanically active. The overall volcanic center density is 4.4/100 km of arc, and that of active centers is 1.9/100 km. Active volcanoes lie 80 to 230 km (50 to 143 mi) above the subducting Pacific plate, and ~25% lie behind the arc magmatic front. There is no evidence for a regular spacing of volcanoes along the Mariana arc. The frequency distribution of volcano spacing along the arc magmatic front peaks between 20 and 30 km (12 and 19 mi) and shows the asymmetric, long-tail shape typical for many other arcs. The first global compilation of arc volcanoes using recent bathymetric data estimated that arcs that are at least partially submarine have a population of almost 700 volcanoes, of which at least 200 are submerged.

== Arc hydrothermal activity ==
Intraoceanic arcs combined may contribute hydrothermal emissions equal to ~10% of that from the global mid-ocean ridge system. These hydrothermal emissions of hydrogen sulfide, methane, carbon dioxide and hydrogen. These gases are emitted out of seamounts (underwater volcanos) and out of the fractures within these spreading ridges and volcanic arcs.

== Historical importance of IBM arc system ==
Guam in the southern IBM arc system is where Magellan first landed after his epic crossing of the Pacific Ocean in 1521.

Battles were fought on the islands of Saipan and Iwo Jima in 1944 and 1945; many young Japanese and American soldiers died in these battles. George H. W. Bush was shot down in 1945 near Chichijima in the Bonin Islands.

Initially thirty Japanese including an attractive young Japanese woman were stranded in June 1944 on volcanic Anatahan for seven years, along with the overseer of an abandoned plantation. The novel and 1953 film Anatahan are based on this complex saga.

The B-29 bomber Enola Gay flew from Tinian to drop the first atomic bomb on Hiroshima in 1945.

Sergeant Shoichi Yokoi hid out in the wilds of Guam for 28 years before coming out of hiding in 1972.

== See also ==
- Mariana Trench
- Mariana Trough
- Mariana Islands
- South Chamorro Seamount
