= Zealandia Bank =

Natural feature in the Pacific Ocean

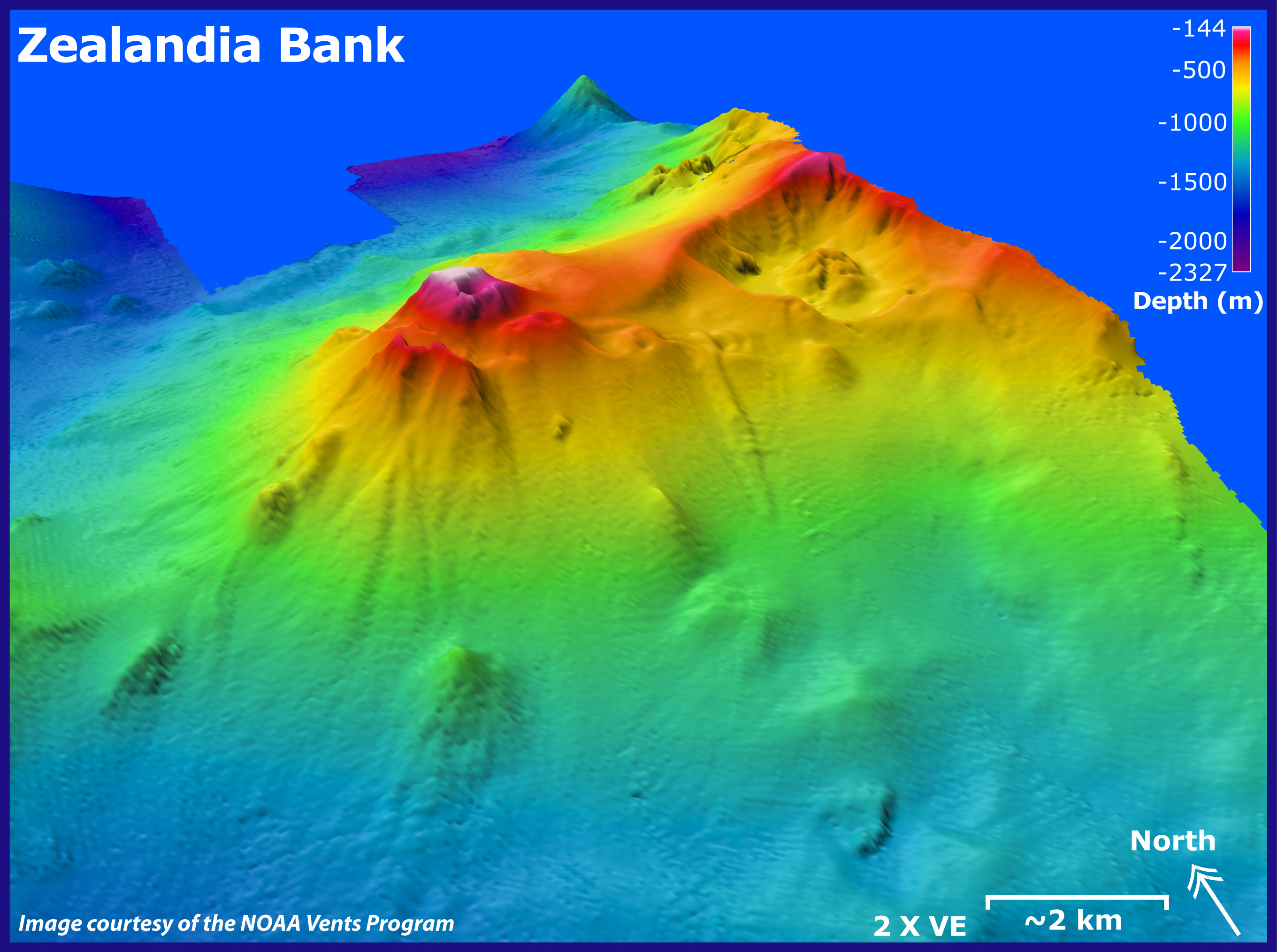
- Zealandia Bank submarine volcano, looking toward the northeast

- Location within Northern Mariana Islands Location within North Pacific

Geography
- Location: Pacific Ocean
- Coordinates: 16°53′N 145°51′E
- Archipelago: Northern Mariana Islands
- Highest elevation: 1 m (3 ft)

Administration
- United States
- Commonwealth: Northern Mariana Islands

Demographics
- Population: uninhabited - (2010)

Zealandia Bank, also known as Farallon de Torres or Piedras de Torres in Spanish, or Papaungan in Chamorro, consists of two rocky pinnacles about 1.5 kilometers (0.9 mi; 0.8 nmi) apart, in the Northern Mariana Islands in the Pacific Ocean. One reaches a height of approximately 1 meter (3.3 ft) at low tide; the other does not normally broach the surface. They are located 11 nautical miles (13 mi; 20 km) north-northeast of Sarigan, in between Sarigan and Guguan, but because of their small size, they are not listed in most maps. Zealandia Bank is one of a number of Volcanic Units within the Mariana Arc of Fire National Wildlife Refuge of the Marianas Trench Marine National Monument.

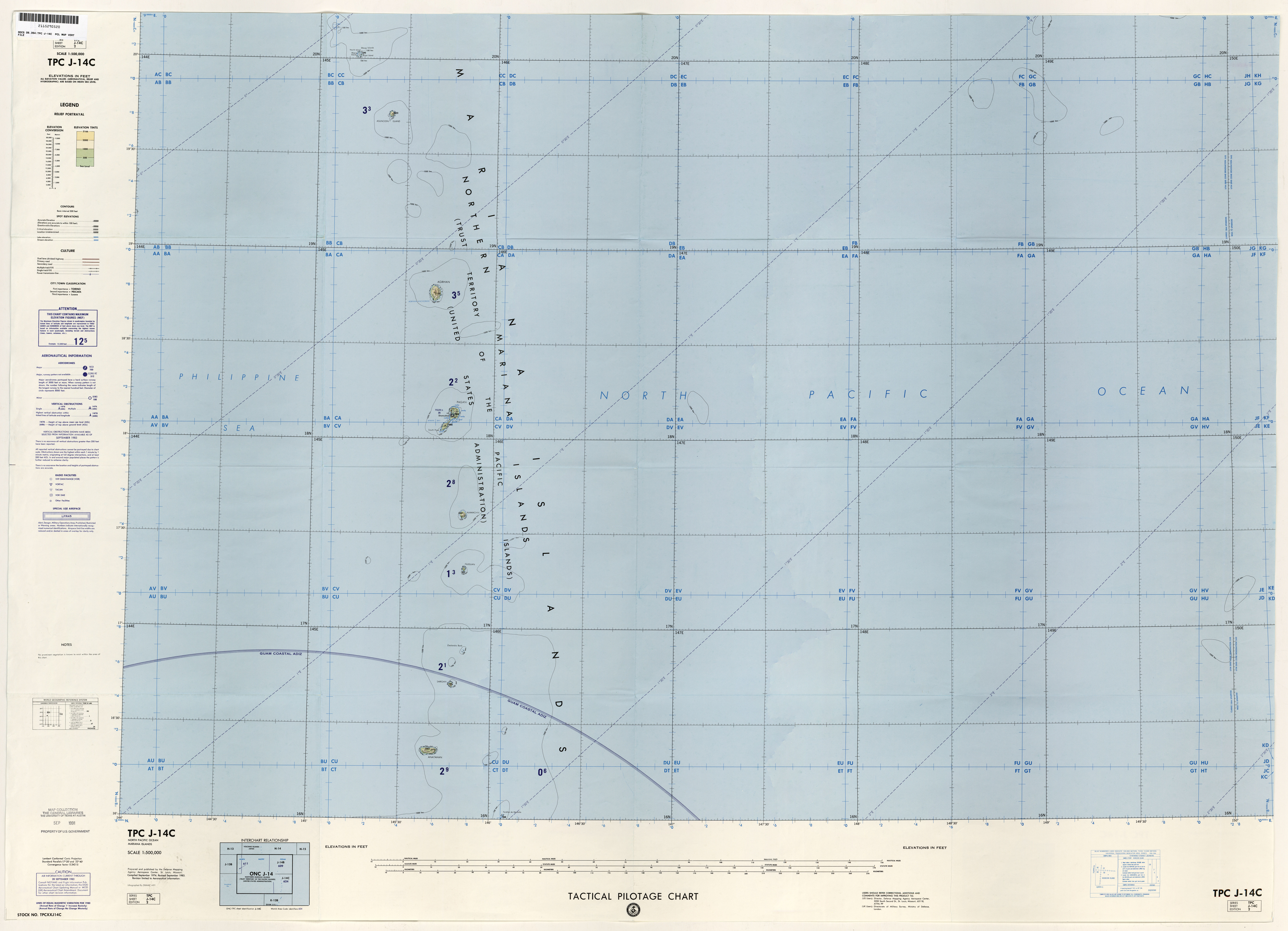
Map including Zealandia Bank (DMA, 1983)

== Geology ==
Zealandia Bank is the exposed portion of the peak of an eroded underwater volcano. In 2004, a survey by NOAA discovered active fumaroles, including possible volcanic activity.

The volcano has erupted most recently rhyodacite but previously built up as an andesitic volcano that was dormant long enough for a carbonate platform to grow on its summit. Given that a large mid- to lower-crustal felsic magma body exists beneath the south-central Izu–Bonin–Mariana Arc extending about 150 km (93 mi) to the south of Zealandia Bank, it and the nearby volcanoes of West Zealandia and Northwest Zealandia, if not currently active, are most likely only dormant and so have been called the Zealandia Volcanic Complex. The Zealandia Bank is the current magmatic front and the other two volcanoes being about 15 km (9.3 mi) west are in a rear arc.

== Name ==
Zealandia Bank was named in 1858 after the British barque Zealandia. The area is part of the United States Commonwealth of the Northern Mariana Islands.
