= Bernardo de la Torre =

Spanish navigator (died 1545)

Bernardo de la Torre or della Torres (died 1545) was a Spanish explorer during the Age of Discovery. He participated in Ruy López de Villalobos's failed expedition to establish a greater Spanish presence in the East Indies. Stuck for months on the eastern side of Mindanao, the expedition ran low on supplies, suffered repeated accidents, and was discovered and ordered to leave by the Portuguese. López de Villalobos sent De la Torre east across the Pacific Ocean to seek supplies and reinforcements from Mexico. Attempting a new northern route, De la Torre discovered the Volcano Islands—which he named after an eruption active as he passed—before being forced to turn back from lack of water and high storm waves. During this return voyage, his ship became the first known to have circumnavigated Mindanao.

De la Torre is sometimes further claimed to have named Mindanao Caesarea Caroli in honor of the Habsburg emperor Charles V; to have named Leyte and Samar the Philippines in honor of the crown prince Philip (later King Philip II of Spain); to have named Iwo Jima Sulfur Island, eventually leading to its current Japanese name; to have discovered the Bonin Islands; and to have explored the northern coast of New Guinea.

== Life ==
Born of Alonso De La Torre in Spain sometime in 1500, original accounts of De la Torre's life and exploration have not survived and the four surviving near contemporary sources differ in some respects and contain some obvious errors.

Bernardo de la Torre sailed in August 1543 under the instructions of Ruy López de Villalobos, who sent him from the Sarangani Islands on the San Juan de Letran ("St. John of Lateran") to try to find a return route to the western coast of Spanish Mexico from the Philippines. This was the fourth such failed attempt to find what would become known as the Manila galleon route once it was finally established in 1565. De la Torre traveled roughly 700 leagues and reached 30°N but then, like his predecessors, was forced back.

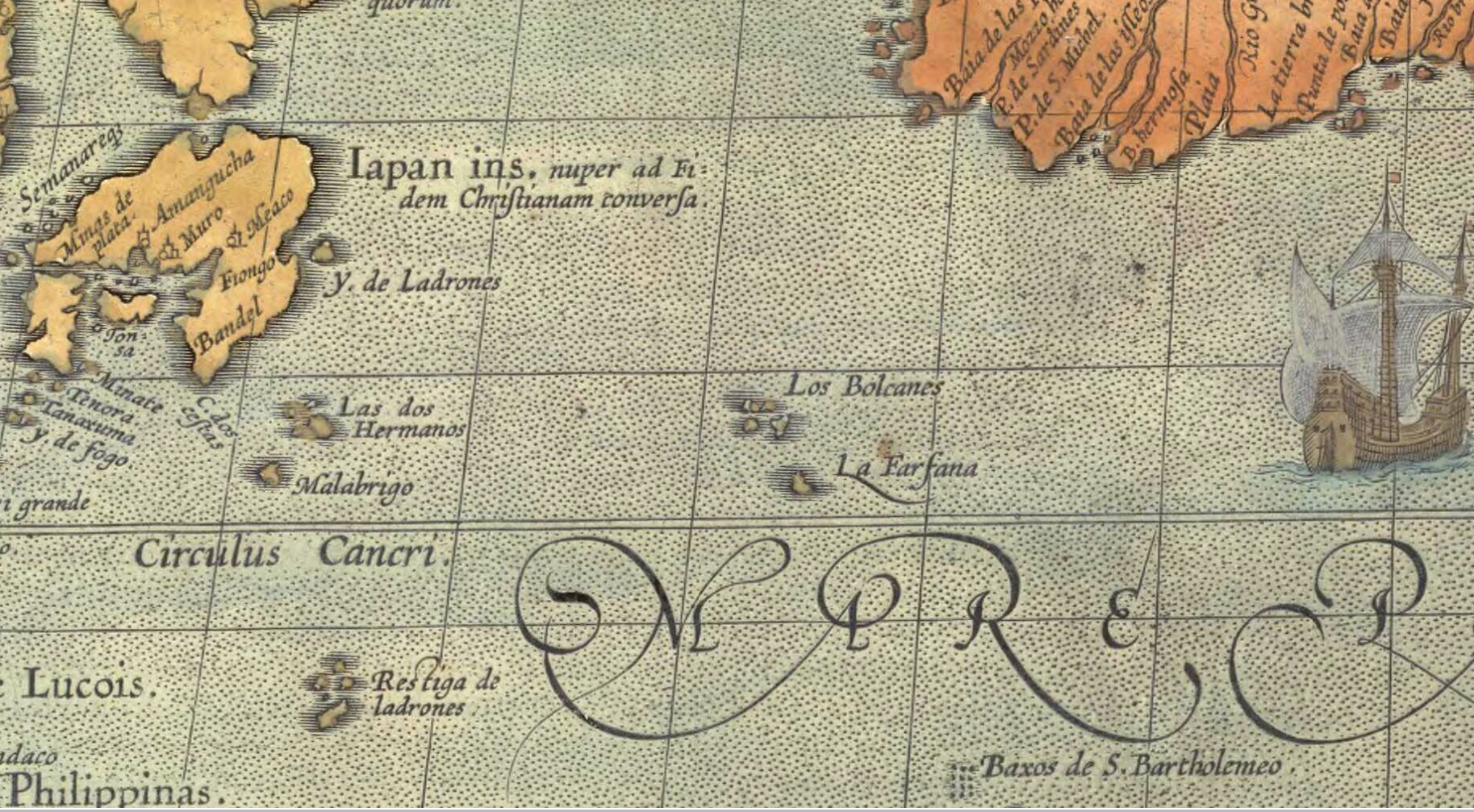
Malabrigo, Las dos Hermanos, Los Bolcanes and La Farfana, as shown on Abraham Ortelius's 1589 Maris Pacifici.

In the course of his journey, De la Torre sighted several groups of islands. Their identities have been a matter of debate among cartographers and scholars.

some islets like modern-day Okinotorishima (which he named Parece Vela) and, possibly, Marcus Island. He reached Leyte and Samar before the end of August and passed through the Marianas in September, sighting three islands that were probably the uninhabited northern groups of Farallon, Anatahan, and Sarigan. He then passed the Volcano Islands group, which he called Los Volcanes and which include Iwo Jima, and some of the Bonin Islands (which he called the Islas del Arzobispo or "Archbishop Islands") including Chichijima (which he called Forfana, i.e. "Orphan"). On his return voyage after being forced back by the condition of his ships and supplies after a storm on October 18, he became the first European to circumnavigate Mindanao. The Portuguese and their agents had forced Villalobos to leave the area and De la Torre was forced into a fruitless search for them, eventually breaking off and going to Tidore for repairs.

His explorations, among others, were mentioned in Juan de Gaetano's 1546 chronicle of his own exploration, entitled Viaje a las Islas de Poniente ("Voyage to the Islands of the West"). The islands discovered by De la Torre were recorded on European maps from the 1550s onwards, in particular by Giacomo Gastaldi in Venice (1554 and 1561); by André Homem (1559), Bartolomeu Velho (ca.1560), Lázaro Luís (1563) and Fernão Vaz Dourado (1568) in Portugal, and by Abraham Ortelius (1564 and 1570) and Gerardus Mercator (1569) in the Spanish Low Countries.

== Legacy ==
According to some sources, Bernardo de la Torre was the person who changed the name of what used to be known as the Islas de Poniente ("Islands of the West") to the Felipinas or Philippines, to honor the Prince of Asturias Philip, subsequently king of Spain. Other sources credit Villalobos instead.

Some of the appellations coined by De la Torre continued to appear on maps of the Pacific until the 20th century. Forfana, in particular, was drawn in numerous different places as cartographers could not agree on its true position.

== Bibliography ==
- Combés, Francisco (1897), "Pro/logo", in Retana, Wenceslao Emilio; et al. (eds.), Historia de Mindanao y Joló (in Spanish), Madrid: Minuesa de los Rios, pp. i–cxliii.
- Dunmore, John (1991), "Torre", Who's Who in Pacific Navigation, Honolulu: University of Hawaiʻi Press, p. 247, ISBN 9780824883942.
- Eldridge, Robert D., Iwo Jima and the Bonin Islands in U.S.–Japan Relations: American Strategy, Japanese Territory, and the Islanders In-Between (PDF), Quantico: Marine Corps University Press.
- Kublin, Hyman (March 1953), "The Discovery of the Bonin Islands: A Reexamination" (PDF), Annals of the Association of American Geographers, vol. 43, Milton Park: Taylor & Francis, pp. 27–46, JSTOR 2561081.
