= Northern Islands Municipality, Northern Mariana Islands =

Political division of the Northern Mariana Islands

Coordinates: 18°06′00″N 145°45′36″E

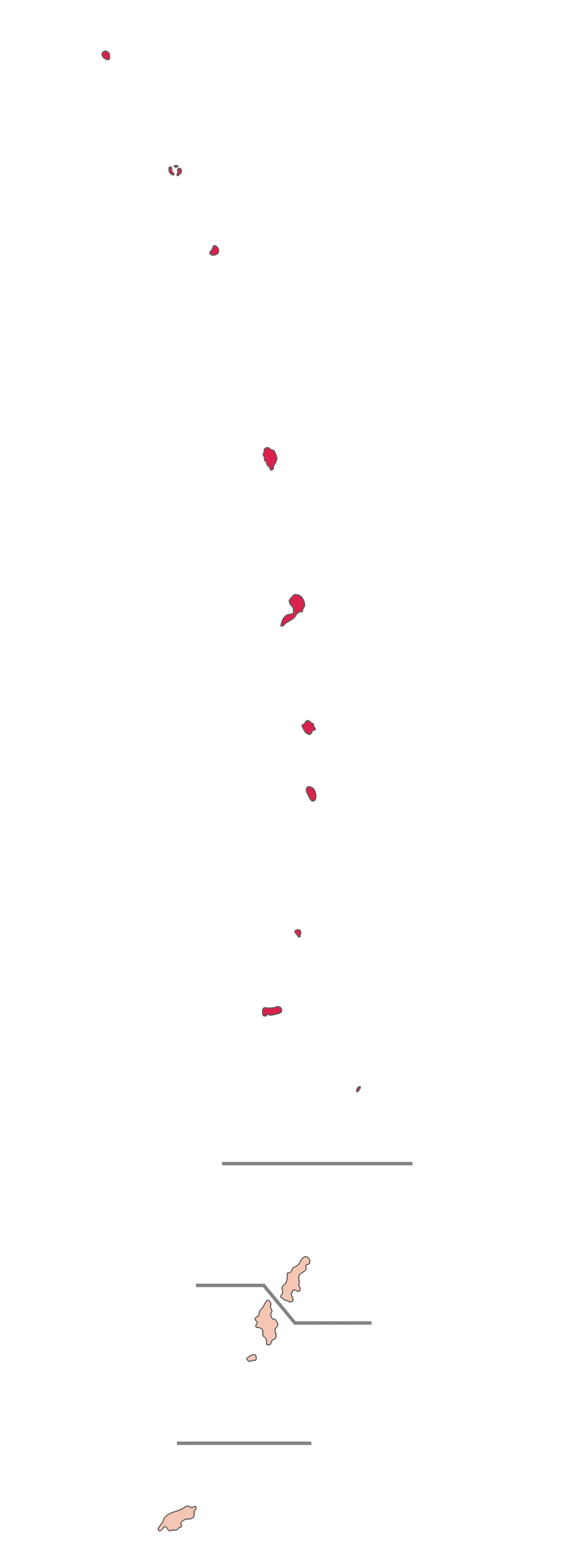
Map of the four municipalities of the Northern Mariana Islands, with the Northern Islands Municipality (topmost) highlighted in red

Northern Islands Municipality is one of the four main political divisions of the Commonwealth of the Northern Mariana Islands. It consists of a long string of the northernmost islands of the Northern Marianas, including (from north to south) Farallon de Pajaros, the Maug Islands, Asuncion, Agrihan, Pagan, Alamagan, Guguan, Zealandia Bank, Sarigan, Anatahan, and Farallon de Medinilla. The total land area of the islands, including offshore islets and rocks, is 154.755 km^{2} (59.75 sq mi).

== Population ==
While the 2010 census reported the municipality to be uninhabited, the 2020 census reported a population of 7. Populations were reported on Agrihan, Pagan, and Alamagan, while Anatahan, though historically inhabited, was reported to have a population of 0. Many Northern Islands inhabitants have secondary residences on Saipan due to economic, educational or other needs. Some islands have also been evacuated due to volcanic activity, such as in the case of Anatahan (2003) and Pagan (early 1980s).

The mayor's office and municipality administration, traditionally in the village of Shomushon on Pagan, is now "in exile" on Saipan. In the 2022 Northern Mariana Islands general election, Republican candidate Valentino Nicky Taisacan beat out independent Jocelyn Frances Kapileo to become the current mayor. In 2005, there were 99 votes cast in the municipality. For the NMI House of Representatives, Northern Islands voters are grouped with one of the Saipan districts.

=== Population by census-designated place ===
Place	2020	2010
Uracus (Farallon de Pajaros)	0	0
Maug	0	0
Asuncion	0	0
Agrihan	4	0
Pagan	2	0
Alamagan	1	0
Guguan	0	0
Sarigan	0	0
Anatahan	0	0
Farallon de Medinilla	0	0
Northern Islands Municipality	7	0

== Transportation and communications ==
Most of the Northern Islands can be reached only by boat, except for a general aviation airstrip, Pagan Airstrip, that serves Pagan. There are no electricity or telephone systems, and residents rely on generators for electricity and radio for communications.

== Economy ==
Agriculture and fishing are essentially the only economic activities, although on Pagan pozzolan mining became a small industry after the early-1980s volcanic eruptions.

== Education ==
Previously Commonwealth of the Northern Mariana Islands Public School System operated an elementary school on Pagan prior to the 1981 eruptions. In 1977 the school had 13 students. Students from Pagan attending secondary school did so on Saipan.
