= Farallon de Medinilla =

Island in the Pacific Ocean

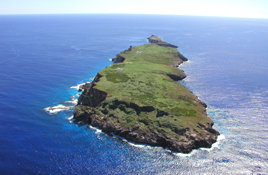
- NOAA photo of Farallon de Medinilla

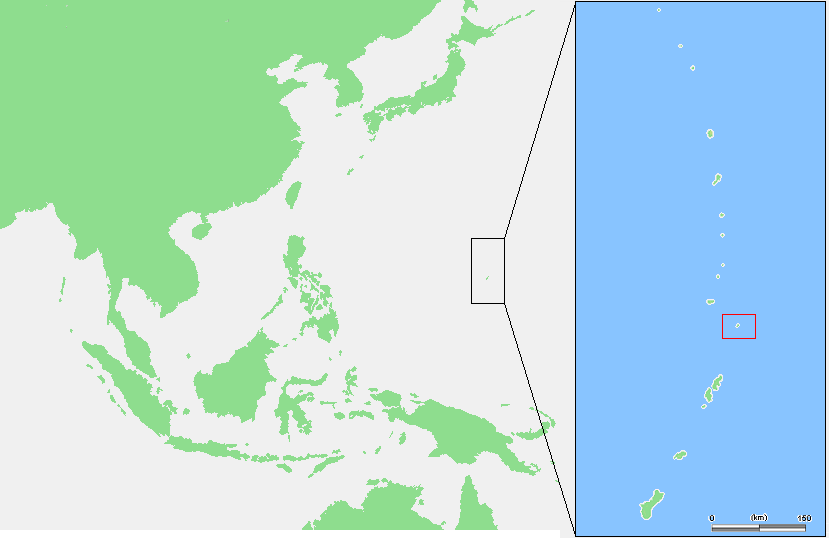

Geography
- Location: Pacific Ocean
- Coordinates: 16°1′2″N 146°3′31″E
- Archipelago: Northern Mariana Islands
- Area: 0.35 sq mi (0.91 km^{2})
- Length: 2.8 km (1.74 mi)
- Width: 0.5 km (0.31 mi)
- Highest elevation: 81 m (266 ft)

Administration
- United States
- Commonwealth: Northern Mariana Islands

Demographics
- Population: uninhabited - (2010)

Farallon de Medinilla , also known as No'os, is a small uninhabited island in the Northern Mariana Islands in the Pacific Ocean. It lies 45 miles (39 nmi; 72 km) north of Saipan and is the smallest island in the Mariana Islands (not counting the Zealandia Bank). Politically, it is part of the Northern Islands Municipality.

== History ==
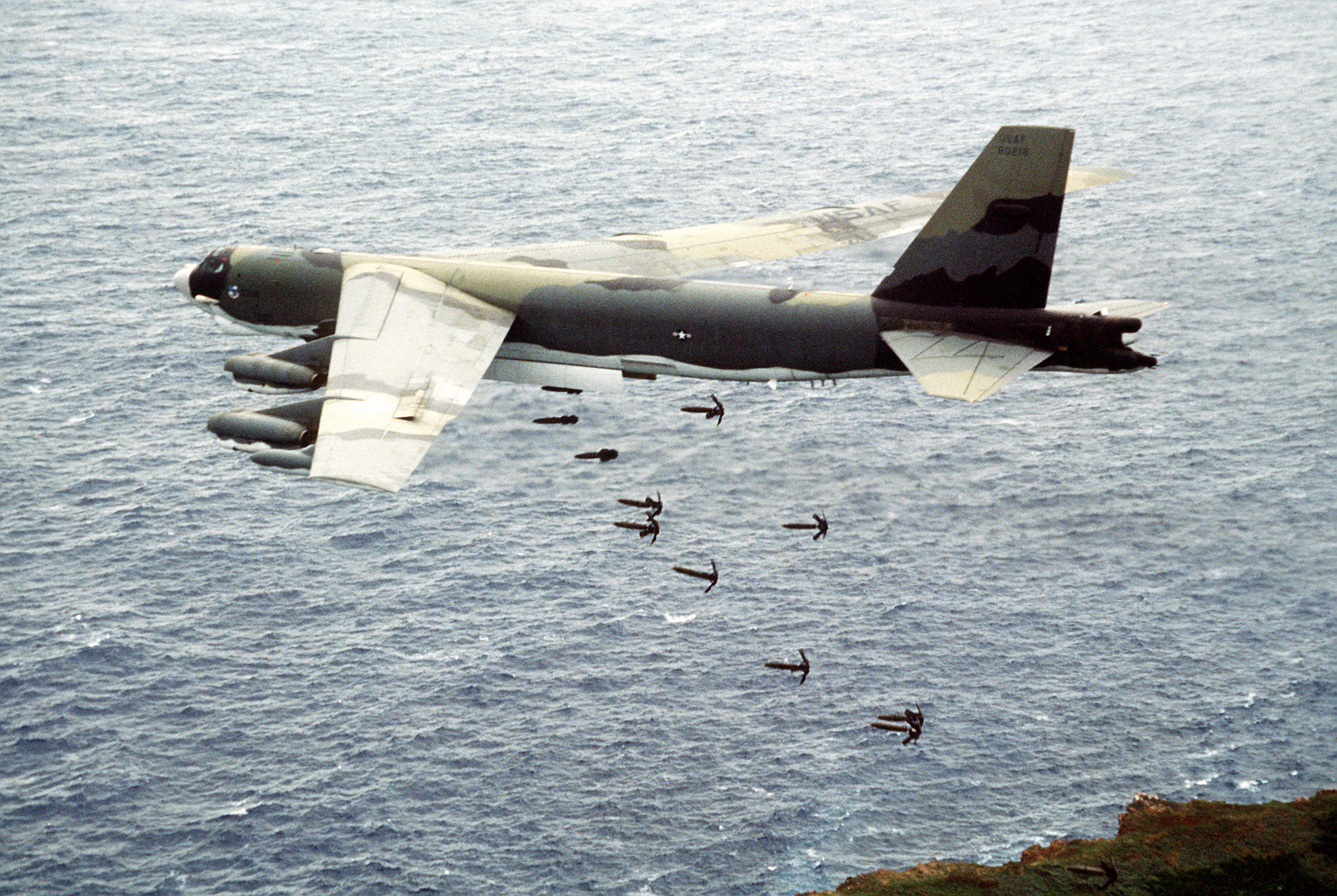
A United States Air Force B-52G Stratofortress dropping 500 lb (227 kg) Mk 82 bombs on the island in 1984.

Spanish explorer Bernardo de la Torre, commanding the carrack San Juan de Letrán, was the first European to chart Farallon de Medinilla, which he sighted in late September or early October 1543 during a failed attempt to find a northern route east from the Spanish Philippines to the Viceroyalty of New Spain (now Mexico). The island was uninhabited at the time, but later archaeological investigations found blackened caves and pottery fragments indicating prior habitation by the Chamorros. From the 16th century, Spain governed the island as part of the Spanish East Indies. Louis de Freycinet visited the island in 1819, and it eventually was named for Don Jose de Medinilla y Pifieda, the Spanish Governor of the Marianas from 1812 to 1822.

In 1899, Spain sold Farallón de Medinilla along with the rest of the Mariana Islands (except Guam, which was a possession of the United States) to the German Empire under the terms of the German–Spanish Treaty. The formalities of cession of the Marianas took place on Saipan on November 17, 1899. Germany administered Farallon de Medinilla as part of German New Guinea until World War I (1914–1918), when the Empire of Japan took control of the Marianas in 1914. Japan subsequently administered the island as part of the South Seas Mandate. Following the end of World War II in 1945, the island came under the control of the United Nations and was administered on its behalf by the United States as part of the Trust Territory of the Pacific Islands. In 1978, the island became part of the Northern Islands Municipality of the Commonwealth of the Northern Mariana Islands, which in turn became an unincorporated territory and commonwealth of the United States in 1986.

In 1968, residents in the area of Naftan Rock, located off Aguijan near Tinian, asked the United States armed forces to cease using Naftan Rock for bombing practice and to use Farallon de Medinilla instead. Accordingly, bombing practice moved to Farallon de Medinilla in October 1971. In a 2002 lawsuit, the Center for Biological Diversity charged the United States Navy with destroying wildlife habitat on the island. A subsequent court ruling ordered the United States Department of Defense to cease bombing exercises on Farallon de Medinilla until they came into compliance with the Migratory Bird Treaty Act. Scientists and environmentalists have pointed out the negative impact of military activities on local fauna and flora, including both terrestrial and marine species. These include resident birds such as Micronesian megapodes, migratory birds such as boobies, terns, and frigatebirds, and cetaceans such as humpback whales and false killer whales.

== Geography ==
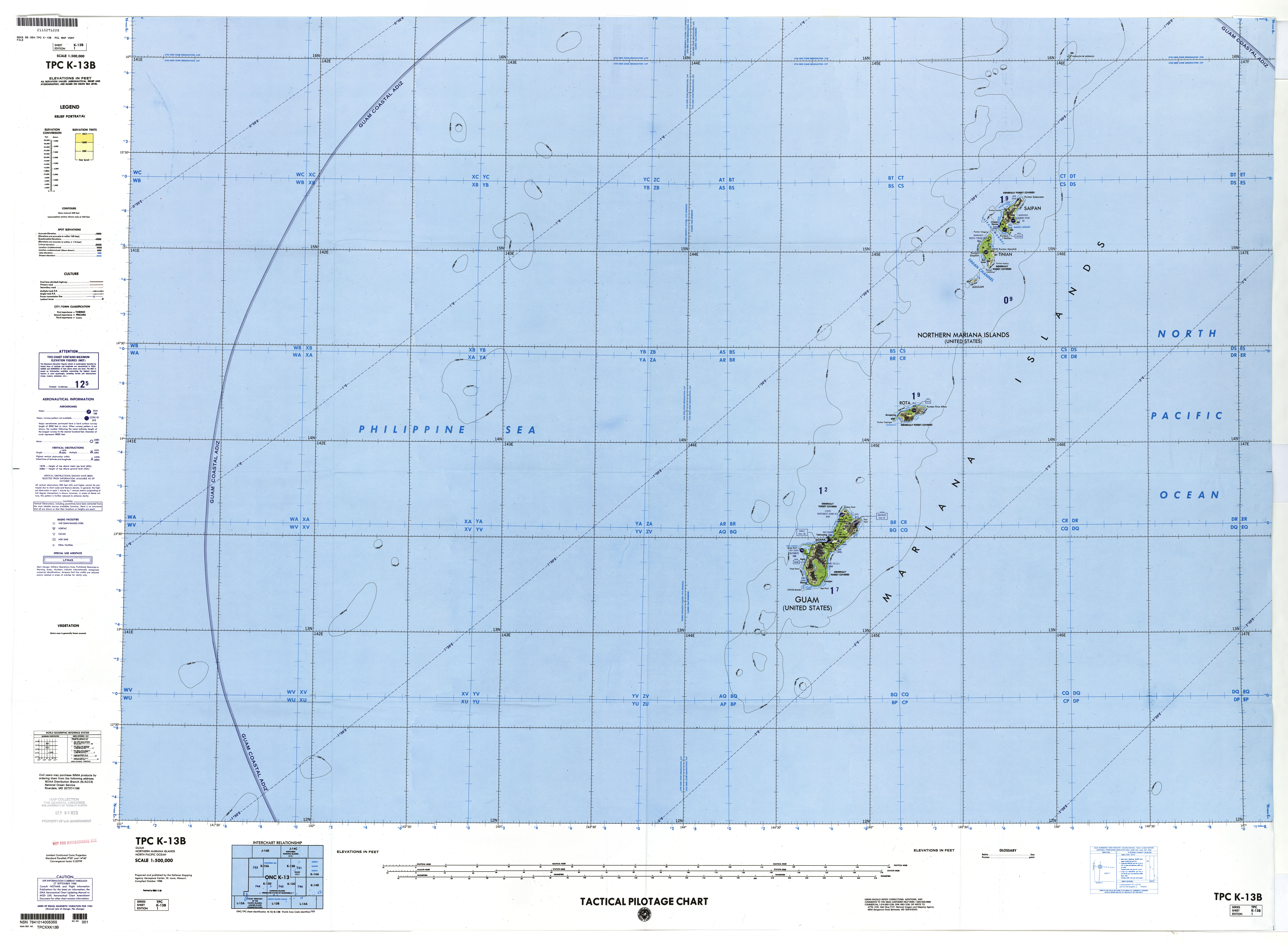
Map including Farallon de Medinilla (DMA, 1988)

Farallon de Medinilla is roughly wedge-shaped, with a length of 2.8 kilometers (1.7 mi) and a width of 150 meters (492 ft) in the south, expanding to 530 m (1,739 ft) in the north, for an area of 0.845 km^{2} (0.326 sq mi). At its narrowest point, the island is only 20 m (66 ft) wide. The highest elevation on the island is 81 m (266 ft). The shores are rimmed with cliffs containing caves and its tableland has some brush and savanna grass.

Satellite imagery (e.g., Google Earth) of the island shows three X-shaped figures and one Y-shaped figure in the island's northern half, built out of metal shipping containers. The U.S. Navy placed these arrangements of shipping containers on the island as targets for bombing practice.
