= Alamagan =

Island in the Northern Marianas island chain

Native name: Alamagan
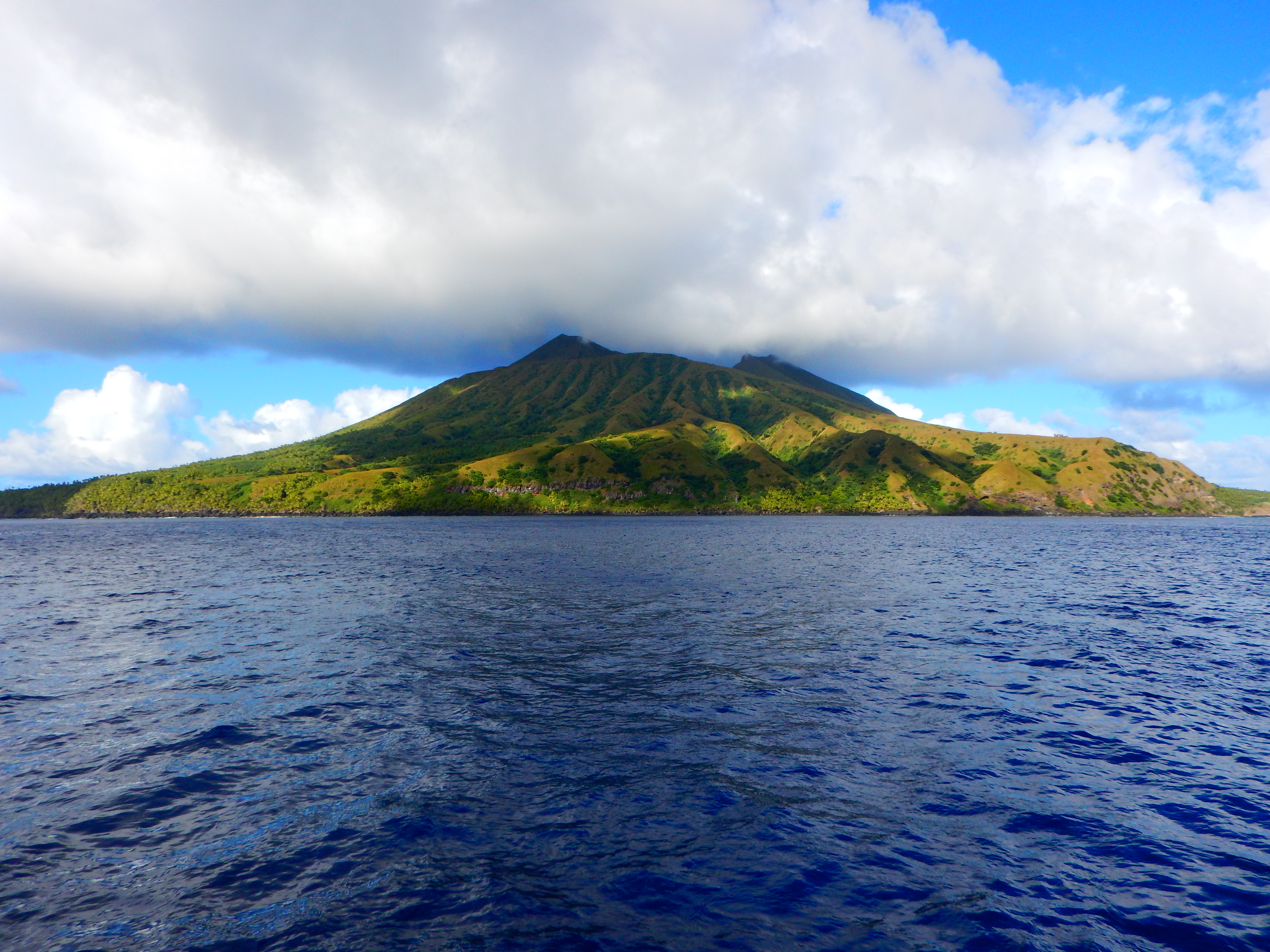
- Alamagan

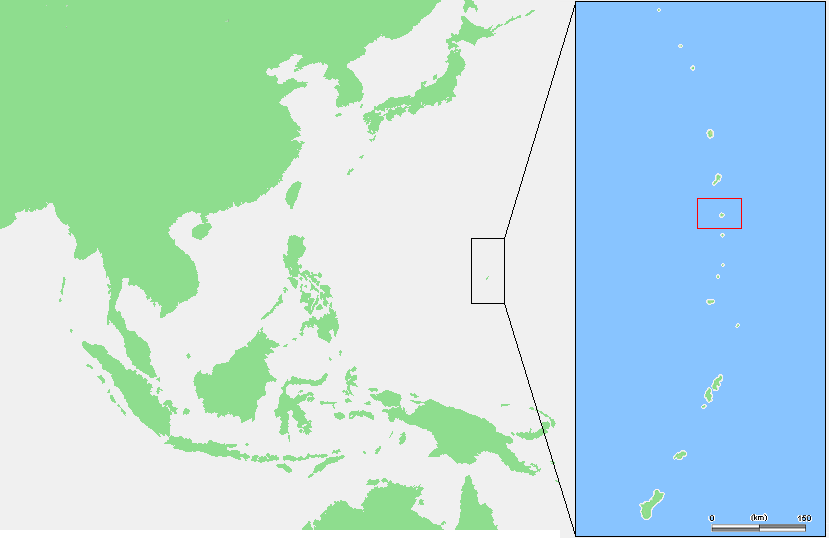

Geography
- Location: Pacific Ocean
- Coordinates: 17°36′2″N 145°50′0″E
- Archipelago: Northern Mariana Islands
- Area: 12.96 km^{2} (5.00 sq mi)
- Length: 4.8 km (2.98 mi)
- Width: 4 km (2.5 mi)
- Highest elevation: 744 m (2441 ft)
- Highest point: Bandeera Peak

Administration
- United States
- Commonwealth: Northern Mariana Islands

Demographics
- Population: 1 (2020)

Alamagan is an island in the Northern Mariana Islands in the Pacific Ocean, 30 kilometres (16 nmi) north of Guguan, 250 kilometres (135 nmi) north of Saipan, and 60 kilometres (32 nmi) south of Pagan. It is currently undergoing resettlement since 2018, with a few people living there. The project was coordinated by the Northern Islands Mayor's office and the people there have radio contact with the mainland.

== History ==
Alamagan was once settled by the Chamorros, who left behind archaeological evidence including stone columns (called latte stones) and ceramics. From a European perspective, Alamagan was discovered in 1669 by the Spanish missionary Diego Luis de San Vitores, who named it Concepción (Immaculate Conception in Spanish). It is likely that it was previously visited in 1522 by the Spanish sailor Gonzalo de Vigo, a deserter from the Magellan expedition in 1521 and the first European castaway in the history of the Pacific. In 1695, Alamagan's natives were forcibly removed to Saipan, and three years later to Guam.

Following the sale of the Northern Marianas by Spain to the German Empire in 1899, Alamagan was administered as part of German New Guinea. During this time, a private firm, the Pagan Society, owned by a German and a Japanese partner, developed more coconut plantations. However, severe typhoons in September 1905, September 1907 and December 1913 destroyed the plantations and bankrupted the company.

During World War I, Alamagan came under the control of the Empire of Japan and was administered as the South Seas Mandate. Following World War II, it came under the control of the United States and was administered as part of the Trust Territory of the Pacific Islands. Since 1978, it has been part of the Northern Islands Municipality of the Commonwealth of the Northern Mariana Islands.

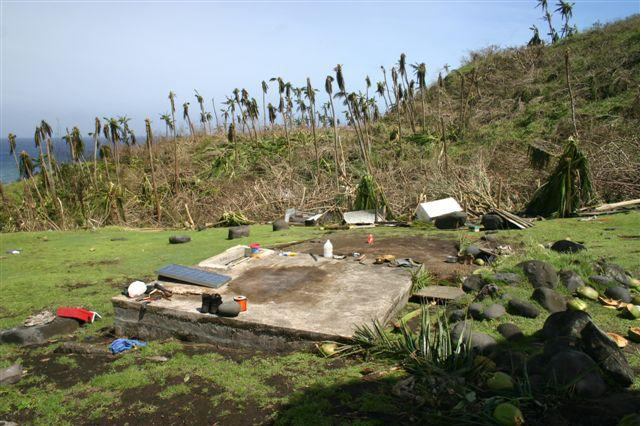
Damage on Alamagan after Typhoon Choi-wan in 2009

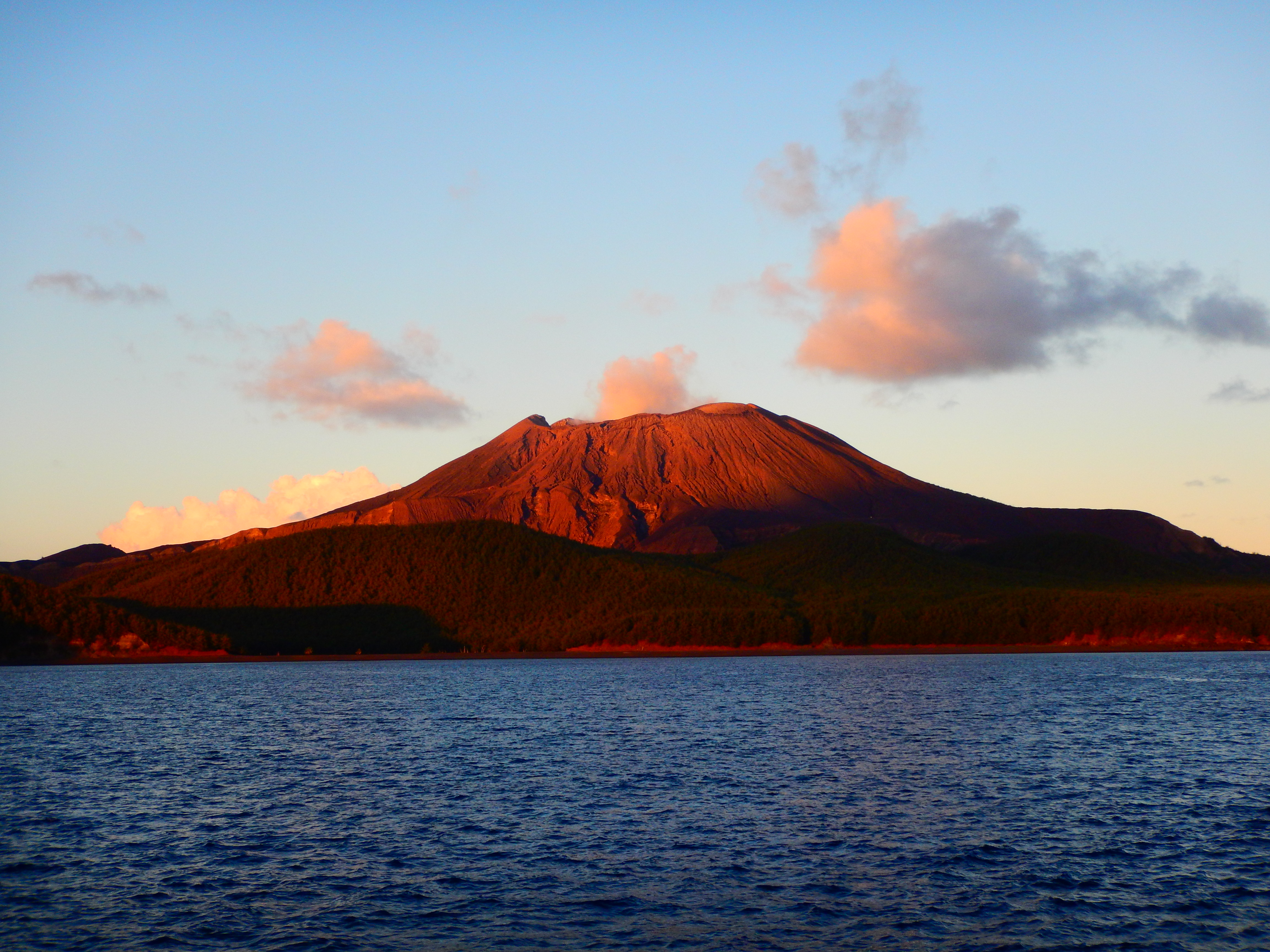
Alamagan island in 2015

The island was inhabited, and continued to be used for the production of copra, with the main settlements of Song Song in the south and Patida camp in the northwest. However, by 1962 the population had dropped so much that the elementary school was closed for lack of students. Due to what was thought to be increased volcanic activity, the islanders were evacuated in December 1998 when an eruption was feared. However, analysis of the event concluded that it was excess rainwater entering fumaroles, causing extra steam, not an eruptive event.

At the 2000 census, only six people were living on Alamagan. In September 2009, Typhoon Choi-wan passed directly over Alamagan, destroying many of the island's trees and forcing the evacuation of the remaining residents to Saipan. As of the 2010 United States census, the island was officially uninhabited at that time.

In 2018, 18 embarked on a mission to repopulate the northern islands of Alamagan and Agrihan. They left Saipan aboard the M/V Super Emerald, and the families had originally come from Alamagan to resettle there. The months long project was coordinated by the mayor's office, and plans to have clean water and radio contact, and also to hopefully send more families there. One returning Marianan remarked " I was born and raised on Saipan but my family is from Alamagan. We are going to live there for a long time....

In 2019, Rep. Sheila Babauta took an expedition by sea to the northern islands visiting Agrigan, Alamagan, and Pagan.

As of 2000, there is about 6 on the island, 0 in 2010, but 1 in 2020, in a place called "the village". The 2020 U.S. Census reports 1 person living in Alamagan village. In June 2020, the crew of a boat on its way to Pagan stopped with engine trouble and ultimately sank near Alamagan, with two crew members abandoning ship and staying at the village in Alamagan.

In 2023, when an injured 30 year old had an emergency medical evacuation to Saipan from Alamagan, he was transported by sea aboard the US Coast Guard Cutter Oliver Henry.

== Geography ==
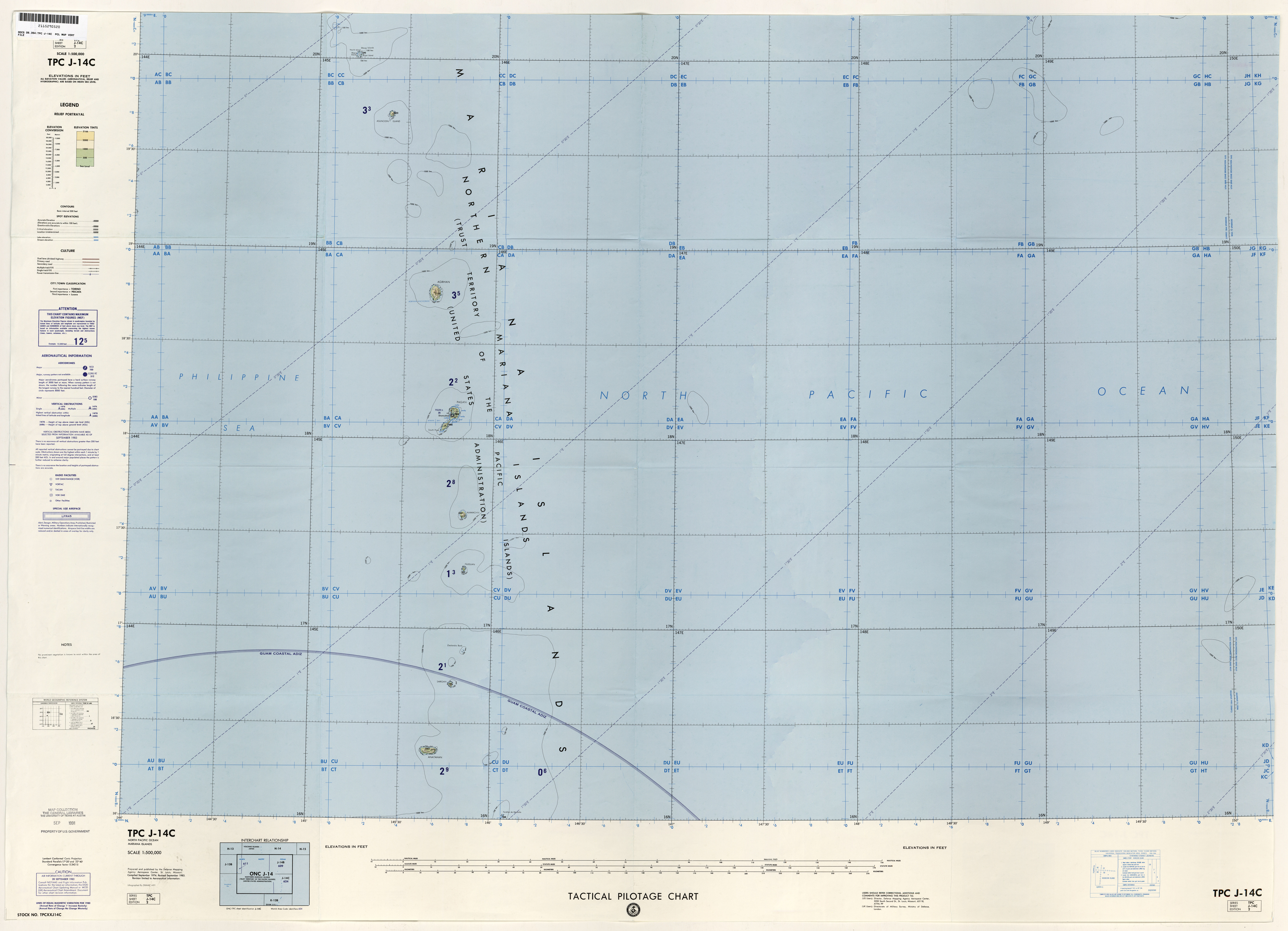
Map including Alamagan (DMA, 1983)

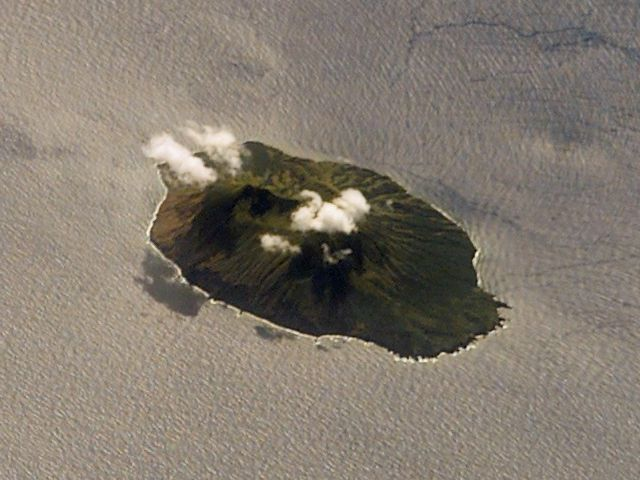
Alamagan island as seen from space by STS-107 Shuttle mission

Alamagan is roughly elliptical in shape, with a length of 4.8 kilometers (3.0 mi), width of 4 km (2.5 mi), and area of 13 km^{2} (5.0 sq mi). The entire island is the summit of a stratovolcano which rises over 4,000 meters (13,120 ft) from the ocean floor, to an altitude of 744 m (2,441 ft) above sea level at Bandeera Peak, at the north-western edge. The volcano is topped by a caldera, 700–900 meters in diameter and about 370 m (1,210 ft) deep. There are three smaller cones to the north, northwest and south of the main crater. The volcano has not erupted in historical times, but by radiocarbon dating, eruptions occurred in 540 AD and 870 AD, with a potential dating error of around 100 years. These eruptions involved pyroclastic flows and had a VEI of 4. Claims of the most recent historical eruptions are not clear, eruptions might have occurred as late as 1887. Within the main crater and on the western slopes are a number of active fumaroles.

Two historical eruptions were around the year 870 give or take a century, and another 540 give or take 75 years.

The island has extremely steep slopes on its eastern side which are prone to landslides. The western slope has deep canyons as the result of erosion. The shoreline is dominated by steep cliffs of up to 100 m (330 ft) on the eastern shore. Vegetation on the island's west side includes swordgrass (Miscanthus floridulus). The south-east side is a steep slope of bare lava. Coconut palms (Cocos nucifera), grow on the gradual slopes. There are deep valleys with caves, and there are fresh water springs on the northern part of the west coast.

Alamagan does not have sand or pebble beach, but rather mid-sized stones piled on one another.

=== Important Bird Area ===
The island has been recognized as an Important Bird Area (IBA) by BirdLife International because it supports populations of Micronesian megapodes, white-throated ground doves, Micronesian myzomelas, Saipan reed warblers and Micronesian starlings.

=== Plants ===
Two rare plants, Leptecophylla mariannensis, discovered by Japanese botanist Ryōzō Kanehira, and Psychotria hombroniana var. mariannensis, are only known to exist on Alamagan.

== Demographics ==
As of 1980 the population of Alamagan was 36. It was uninhabited at times, but since 2018 has had a small settlement called the village. Since 2018, some families that were originally from the island returned to live there.

== See also ==
- List of stratovolcanoes
