= Allied post-war occupation of Vietnam =

The Allied post-war occupation of Vietnam (1945–1946) refers to two military operational zones in the country, north and south of the 16th parallel:

- Chinese occupation of northern Vietnam, pressuring the coexistence of the communist-led Viet Minh and Vietnamese nationalist forces
- British occupation of southern Vietnam, facilitating the French return and leading to the War in southern Vietnam
