= Anatahan =

Island of the Northern Mariana Islands

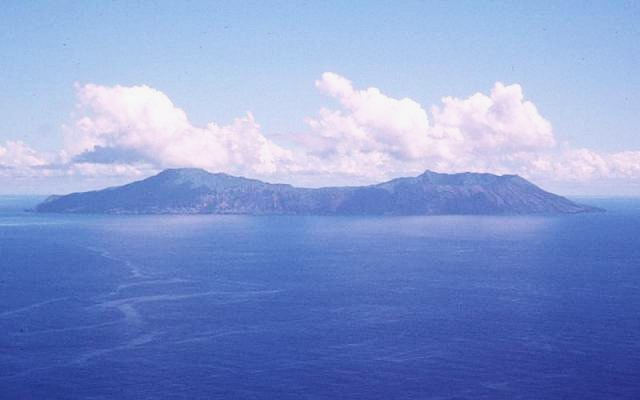
- United States Geological Survey photo of Anatahan erupting in June, 2005.

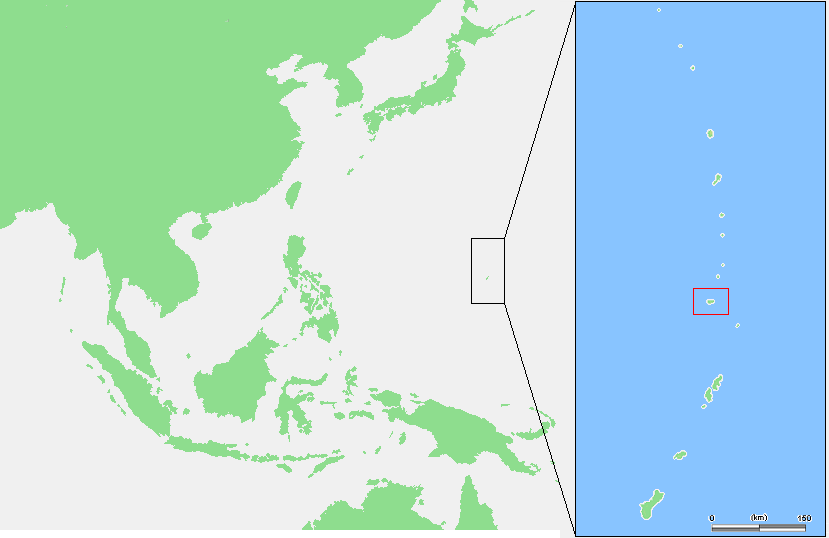

Geography
- Location: Pacific Ocean
- Coordinates: 16°21′5″N 145°40′43″E
- Archipelago: Northern Mariana Islands
- Area: 33.91 km^{2} (13.09 sq mi)
- Length: 9 km (5.6 mi)
- Width: 4 km (2.5 mi)
- Highest elevation: 790 m (2590 ft)

Administration
- United States
- Commonwealth: Northern Mariana Islands

Demographics
- Population: 0 (2020)

Anatahan is a volcanic island in the Northern Mariana Islands in the Pacific Ocean, and has one of the most active volcanoes of the archipelago. Formerly inhabited, the island is currently uninhabited due to the constant danger of volcanic eruptions. Anatahan is located 60 kilometers (37 mi; 32 nmi) northwest of Farallon de Medinilla and 120 km (75 mi; 65 nmi) north of Saipan. It last erupted between 2007 and 2008, and also erupted in 2003.

Anatahan is the site of a curious World War II tale in which about 30 Japanese soldiers stayed here, holding out after the war ended in 1945 until 1951 before surrendering; during that time, they lived with a local woman until 1950. Afterwards, the island was inhabited until 1990, when an earthquake struck, leading to its evacuation.

== History ==
The island was first charted by Europeans in late October 1543 by Spanish explorer Bernardo de la Torre on board of the carrack San Juan de Letrán when trying to return from Sarangani to New Spain. At the time, the island was settled by the Chamorros. In 1695, the natives were forcibly removed to Saipan and, three years later, to Guam. Under Spanish rule, coconut plantations were developed for the production of copra. In 1884, an estimated 125 tons were exported.

Following the sale of the Northern Marianas by Spain to the German Empire in 1899, Anatahan was administered as part of German New Guinea. However, by May 1901 the island was reported as uninhabited. In 1902, the island was leased to a private firm, the Pagan Society, owned by a German and a Japanese partner, to further develop the coconut plantations. Severe typhoons in September 1905 and September 1907 destroyed the plantations and bankrupted the company, although copra production continued on a smaller scale afterwards.

During World War I, Anatahan came under the control of the Empire of Japan in 1914 and was subsequently administered as part of the South Seas Mandate. In June 1944, 30 survivors of at least three Japanese shipwrecks reached Anatahan. After the surrender of Japan in World War II, the Americans evacuated two Japanese and 45 natives from the island, but the Japanese castaways refused to believe that the war had ended, and fled into the interior of the island as Japanese holdouts. By 1950, the holdouts were led by Kazuko Higa, who was the only woman left on the island. Higa lived with a harem of five men, but after eleven of the holdouts died under uncertain circumstances, the remainder surrendered in June 1951. The story of the holdouts was sensationalized as a lurid tale of sex and violent death by the mass media, and was portrayed in 1953 by Josef von Sternberg in his film The Saga of Anatahan. In 1954, one of the survivors, Michiro Maruyama, published a book, Anatahan Island of the Unfortunates, which attempted to refute the more lurid accusations. The story was revived in 1998 by Japanese author Kaoru Ohno as the novel Cage on the Sea, and in 2008 by Natsuo Kirino as the short story "Tokyo-jima", which became a film in 2010.

Following World War II, the island came under the control of the United States and was administered as part of the Trust Territory of the Pacific Islands. Since 1978, the island has been part of the Northern Islands Municipality of the Commonwealth of the Northern Mariana Islands.

The island was inhabited until 1990, when there was an earthquake which led to the population's evacuation, and there has been ongoing volcanic activity on the island since, including eruptions in 2003 and 2008.

== Geography ==
Anatahan
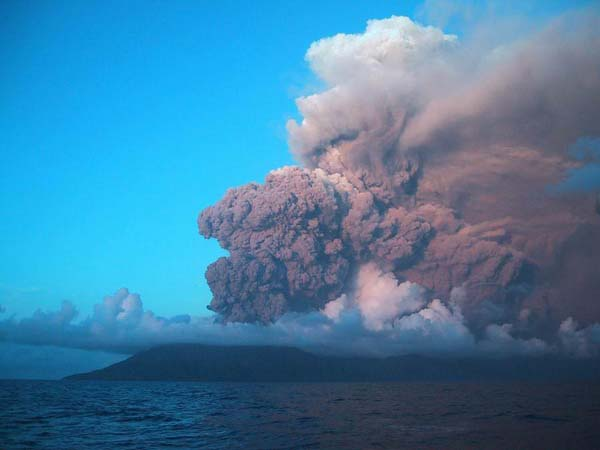
- Anatahan eruption of 2003

Highest point
- Elevation: 790 m (2,590 ft)
- Listing: Volcanoes of the Northern Mariana Islands
- Coordinates: 16°21′N 145°40′E

Geography
- Location: Northern Mariana Islands, Pacific Ocean

Geology
- Mountain type: Stratovolcano
- Last eruption: 2007 – 2008

Anatahan is roughly elliptical in shape, with a length of 9 kilometers (5.6 mi) and a width of 4 km (2.5 mi) and an area of 33.9 km^{2} (13.1 sq mi). The island is the summit of a stratovolcano which reaches an altitude of 790 m (2,592 ft) above sea level at its highest peak.

The volcano is topped by a caldera, 2.3 km (1.4 mi) wide, which is divided into an eastern and western portion, with the eastern portion around 250 m (820 ft) lower than the western. Sparseness of vegetation in the most recent lava flows on Anatahan indicated that they were of Holocene age. In April 1990, the inhabitants of the western coast of the island were evacuated after earthquake swarms and active fumaroles indicated that an eruption might be imminent, but no eruption occurred at that time. A further earthquake swarm occurred in May 1992. The first historical eruption of Anatahan occurred in May 2003, when a large explosive eruption with a Volcanic Explosivity Index of 4 took place forming a new crater inside the eastern caldera and causing an ash plume 12 km (7.5 mi) high which impaired air traffic to Saipan and Guam.

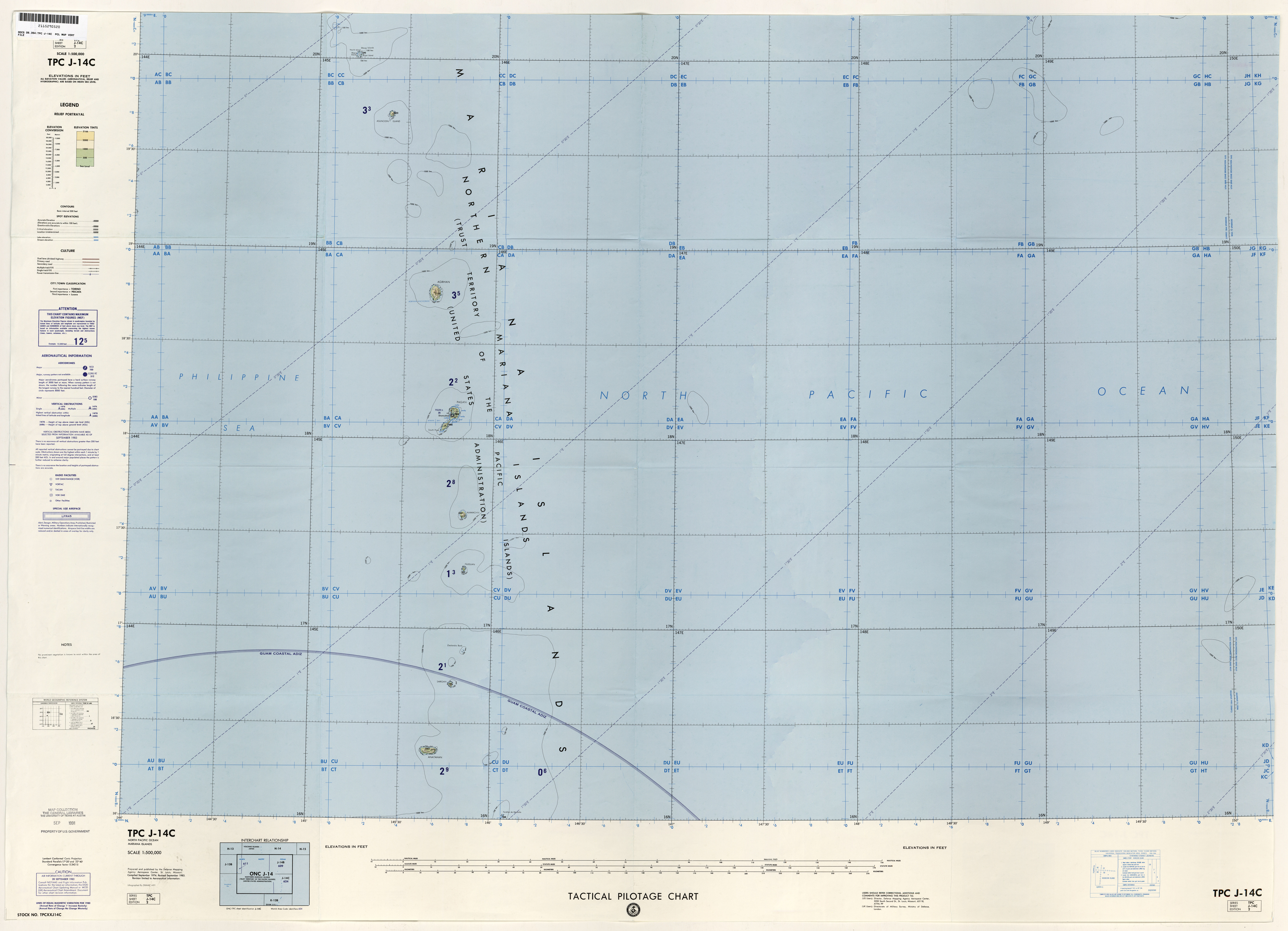
Map including Anatahan (DMA, 1983)

The most recent eruption was in 2007, and lasted until 2008.

== Demographics ==
In 1980, the population of Anatahan was one family. The people resided on Anatahan when school was not in session.

The island was evacuated in 1990 after an earthquake, and 2010 and 2020 census data both showed its population as 0.

== See also ==
- List of stratovolcanoes
