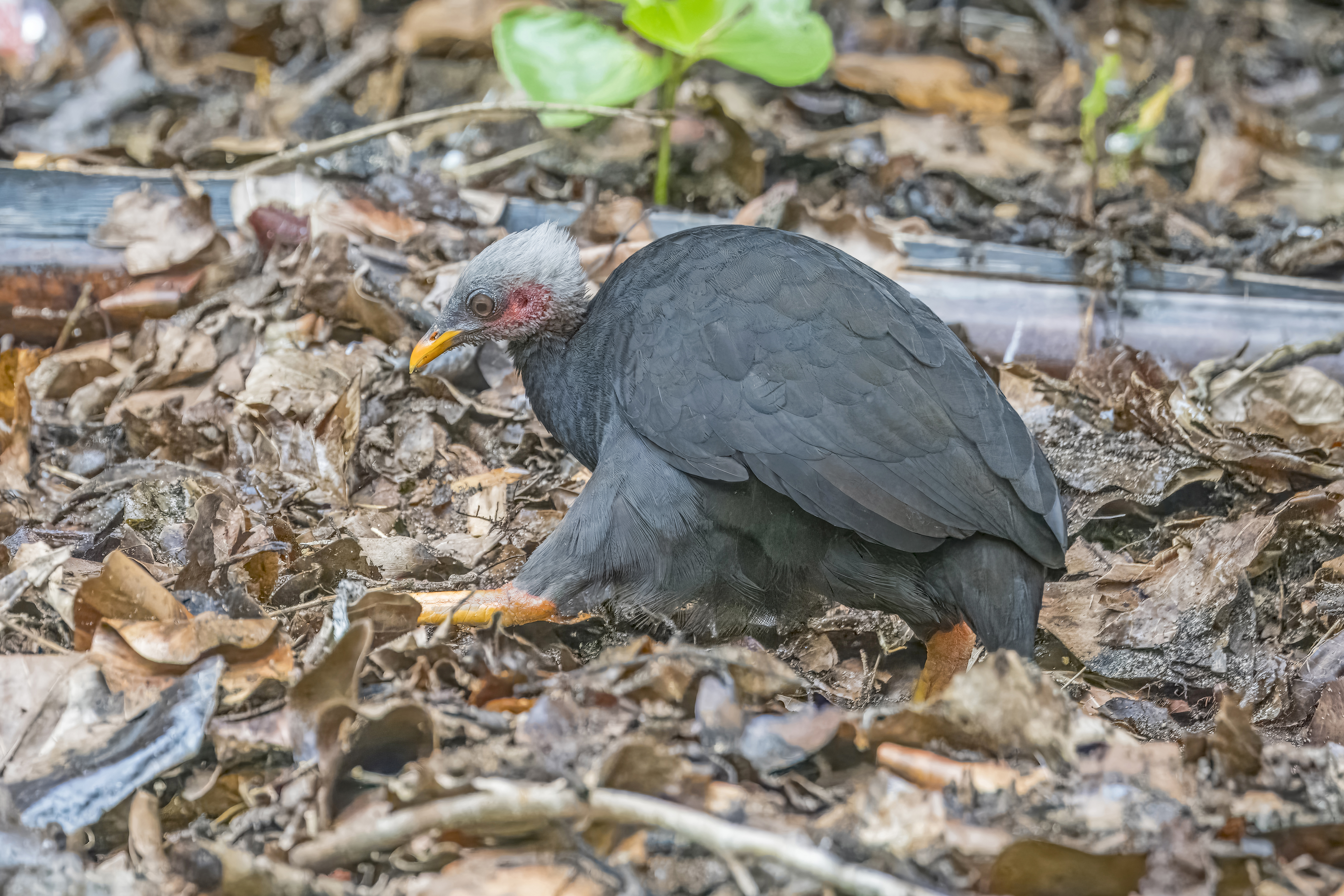
- Megapodius laperouse senex, Palau

Conservation status
- Near Threatened (IUCN 3.1)

Scientific classification
- Kingdom: Animalia
- Phylum: Chordata
- Class: Aves
- Order: Galliformes
- Family: Megapodiidae
- Genus: Megapodius
- Species: M. laperouse

Binomial name
- Megapodius laperouse Gaimard, 1823

Subspecies
- M. l. senex (Hartlaub, 1868) Palau scrubfowl; M. l. laperouse (Gaimard, 1823) Marianas scrubfowl

= Micronesian megapode =

Species of bird

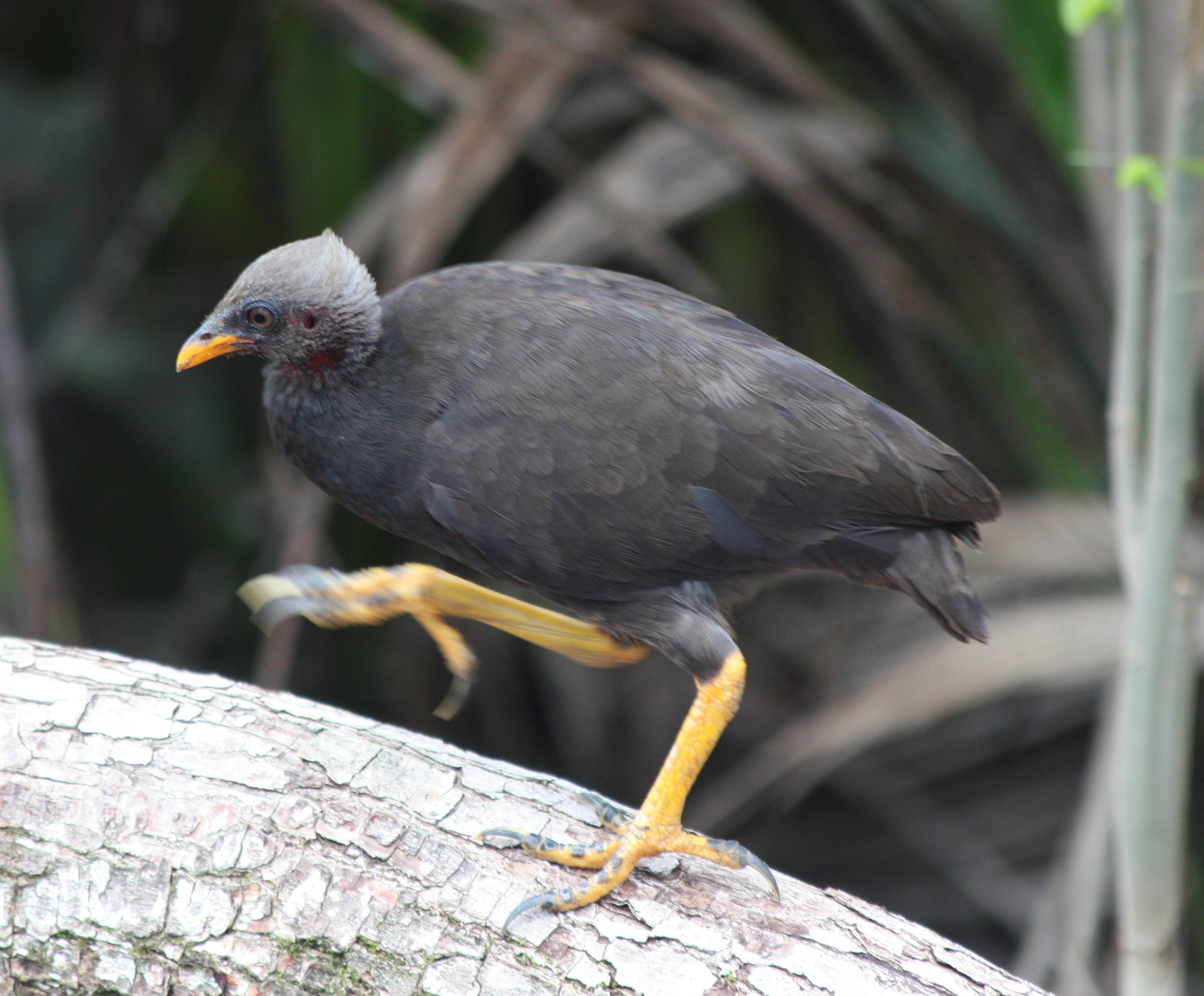
Micronesian megapode on the island of Sarigan

The Micronesian megapode or Micronesian scrubfowl (Megapodius laperouse) is a megapode which inhabits islands of the Western Pacific Ocean.

== Description ==
The Micronesian megapode is a stocky medium-sized bird that is mostly dark brownish-black in appearance. Its head is paler than its body, and it has a pale grey crest, a yellow bill, and large dull-yellow legs and feet.

It is 38 cm. Medium-sized, dark megapode with paler head. Mostly brownish-black with short pale grey crest. Yellow bill, red facial skin showing through thin feathers. Unusually large, dingy yellow legs and feet. Similar species. Could be confused with dark morphs of Red Junglefowl Gallus gallus (or feral domestic stock).

Its call is a loud "keek", song often a duet with one bird beginning a rising and accelerating "keek-keek-keek-keek"- etc. culminating in a loud "kee-keer-kew" (Palau) or "keek-keer-keet" (Marianas), the other answering with a rising cackle that slows near the end.

The Micronesian scrubfowl (Megapodius laperouse) is named after the French explorer Jean-François de Galaup, comte de Lapérouse.

== Habitat ==
The bird is still to be found in the Marianas. It was previously recorded on the islands of Asuncion, Agrihan, Pagan, Aguijan and Alamagan. A remnant population of a few birds may persist on Saipan and Tinian, and it is extinct on Rota and Guam. Small groups of the birds frequent the thickets and scrublands of low outlying islands in the region; however, when present on larger islands, they may also be found inland on higher ground.

Its habitat is thick forest and it is omnivorous, eating a large variety of foods from the forest floor.

== Behavior ==
Often shy and secretive, but becomes relatively tame on inhabited islands where protected from disturbance. Visits nesting mounds several times a day. The birds are known to creep around in the shadows of small trees and are not capable of flying for long distances. However they are accomplished runners and would be very hard to catch.

The Micronesian scrubfowl and some other megapodes are the only birds known to incubate their eggs using volcanic heat.

=== Breeding ===
During the breeding season, just after the southeast monsoon comes in, the females make large mounds of debris in which to lay their eggs. Some individual females will lay their eggs together in the same mound. However the females do not use the same mound more than once and are swapped with different females. When the eggs hatch after one to two months later, the chicks will feed on grass shoots and insects.

== Conservation ==
The species is currently classified as endangered because it has a very small range, restricted to isolated undisturbed offshore islets. Megapodius laperouse occurs on Palau and the Northern Mariana Islands, and is extirpated from Guam.

The introduction of dogs, cats, pigs, and rats is believed to have led to the decline of this species throughout most of the islands. Along with increased predation, during the Japanese occupation of the islands of Saipan and Tinian, most of the vegetation of both islands was burnt and replaced by large sugar cane farms.

It is estimated that only 2000–2500 of the species remain. It can be found in the island nation of Palau, and undisturbed islands of the Northern Marianas chain, with several hundred on Sarigan. A relatively small population has remained on Saipan throughout the years.

The bird appears on the 2010 IUCN Red List Category (as evaluated by BirdLife International - the official Red List Authority for birds for IUCN). The species qualifies as "Endangered" because it has a very small range, restricted to isolated undisturbed offshore islets, with few birds elsewhere. Given the multiple threats across its range, it is likely to be suffering from a continuing decline.

== Subspecies ==
The Marianas Island megapode or Megapodius laperouse laperouse is the nominate subspecies of the Micronesian megapode found in the Mariana Islands. It is rare, localised and in danger of disappearing.
