= Guguan =

Island in the Northern Marianas island chain

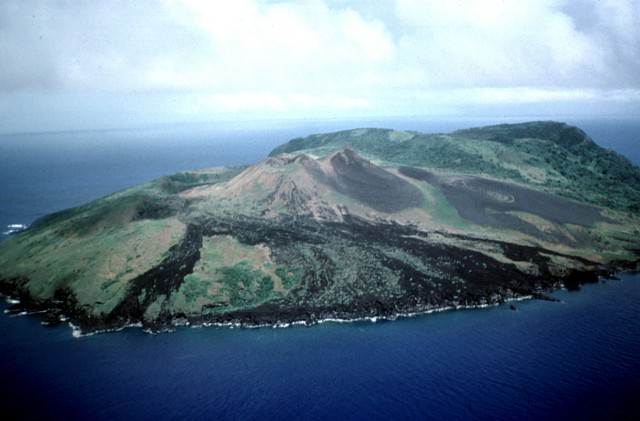
- US Geological Survey photo of Guguan

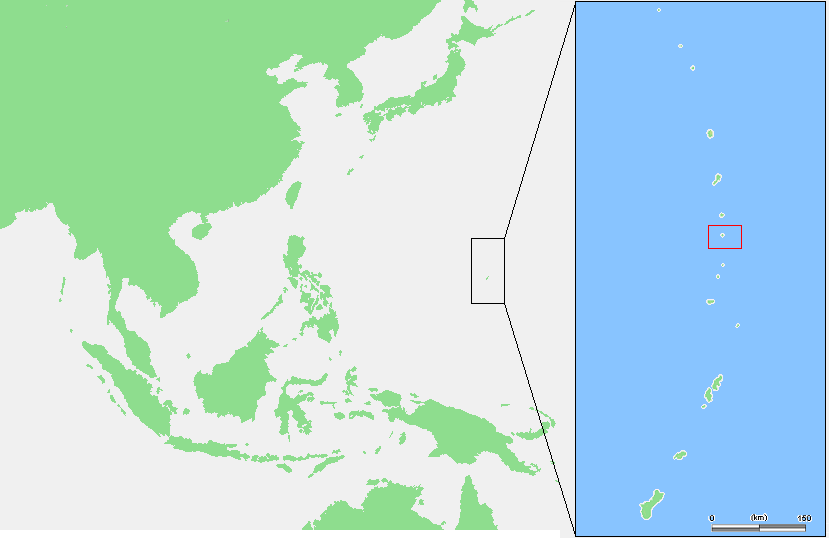

Geography
- Location: Pacific Ocean
- Coordinates: 17°18′39″N 145°50′30″E
- Archipelago: Northern Mariana Islands
- Area: 4 km^{2} (1.5 sq mi)
- Length: 2.8 km (1.74 mi)
- Width: 2.3 km (1.43 mi)
- Highest elevation: 287 m (942 ft)

Administration
- United States
- Commonwealth: Northern Mariana Islands

Demographics
- Population: uninhabited - (2010)

Guguan is an island in the Northern Mariana Islands in the Pacific Ocean. The island is currently uninhabited. Guguan is located 30 nautical miles (56 km) south from Alamagan and 250 nautical miles (463 km) north from Saipan, and is 67 nautical miles (124 km) northeast from Sarigan.

== History ==
Guguan was discovered in 1668 by the Spanish missionary Diego Luis de Sanvitores who charted it as San Felipe. It is likely that it was previously visited in 1522 by the Spanish sailor Gonzalo de Vigo, deserter from the Magellan expedition in 1521, who was the first European castaway in the history of the Pacific. Uninhabited at the time, in contrast to other islands in the Marianas it was never colonized. As with the other islands in the northern Marianna, Guguan was sold by Spain to the German Empire in 1899, and administered as part of German New Guinea. From 1909 to 1912, the island was leased to a Japanese company, who sent hunters to gather bird feathers for the European hat industry.

During World War I, Guguan came under the control of the Empire of Japan and was subsequently administered as the South Seas Mandate. Following World War II, the island came under the control of the United States and was administered as part of the Trust Territory of the Pacific Islands. Since 1978, the island has been part of the Northern Islands Municipality of the Commonwealth of the Northern Mariana Islands.

== Geography ==
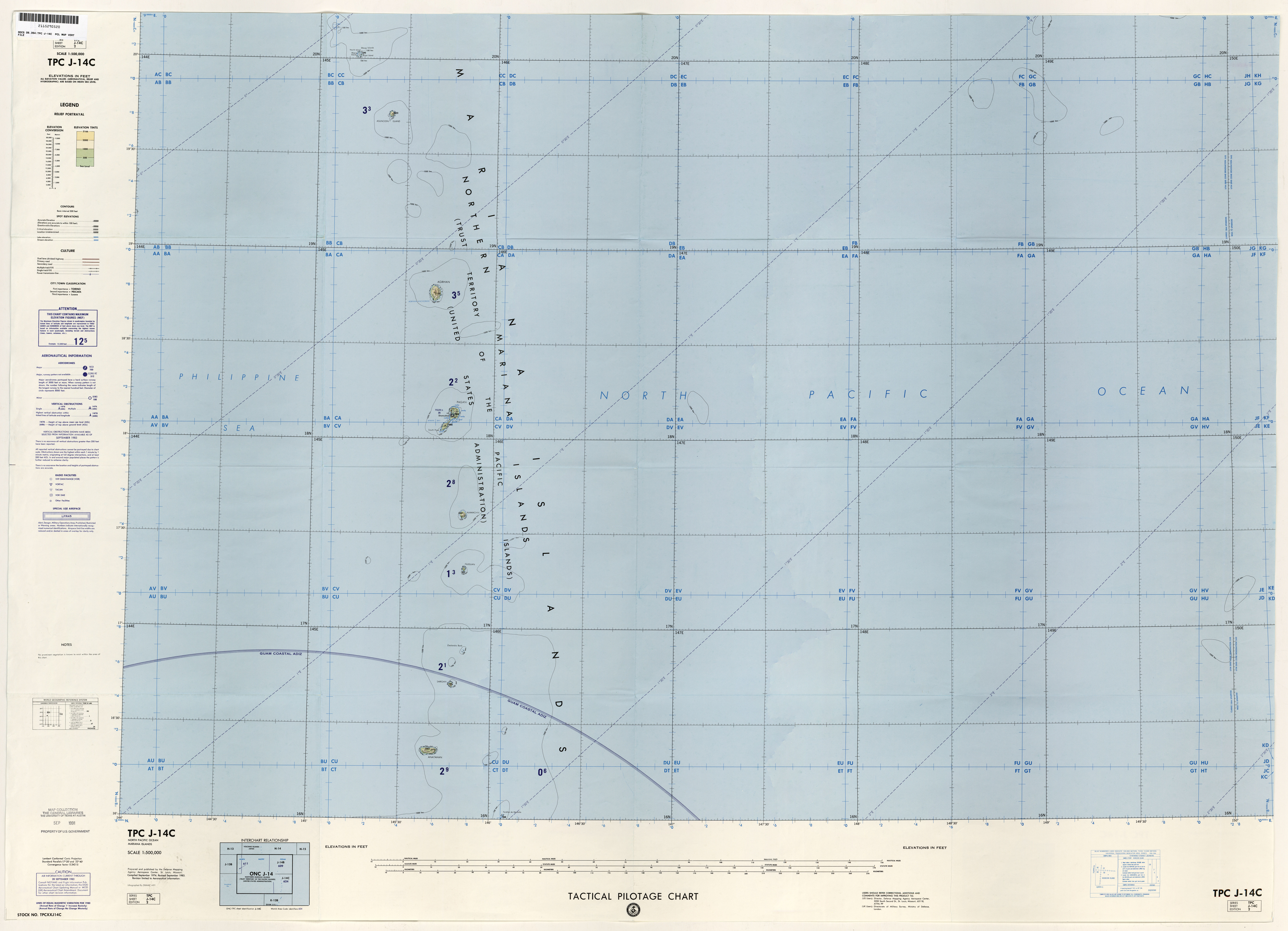
Map including Guguan (DMA, 1983)

Guguan is roughly circular in shape, with a length of 2.8 kilometers (1.7 mi) and a width of 2.3 km (1.4 mi) and an area of 3.87 km^{2} (1.49 sq mi). The island consists of two stratovolcanoes, the southern of which having a height of 287 m (942 ft) above sea level, and the northern of which having a height of 263 m (863 ft). The only recorded eruption was around 1883, from the northern peak, which produced pyroclastic flows as well as lava flows which reached the coast. The coast is bordered by steep basaltic rock with gables of high ridges which contain deep, rain-eroded gorges.

== Environment ==
In the early 1980s, Guguan was set aside as a nature preserve by the Commonwealth of the Northern Mariana Islands (CNMI). It has never been permanently settled by humans and is free from feral species such as feral camels, cats, chickens, dogs, donkeys, goats, horses, mice, pigeons, pigs, rabbits, rats. Among the undisturbed wildlife is the rare Micronesian megapode Megapodius laperouse which can be found only in the Northern Marianas and the Palau Islands. The island has been recognised as an Important Bird Area (IBA) by BirdLife International because it supports populations of Micronesian megapodes, white-throated ground doves, sooty terns, grey-backed terns, Micronesian myzomelas and Micronesian starlings.
