= Sarigan =

Volcanic island in the Northern Marianas island chain

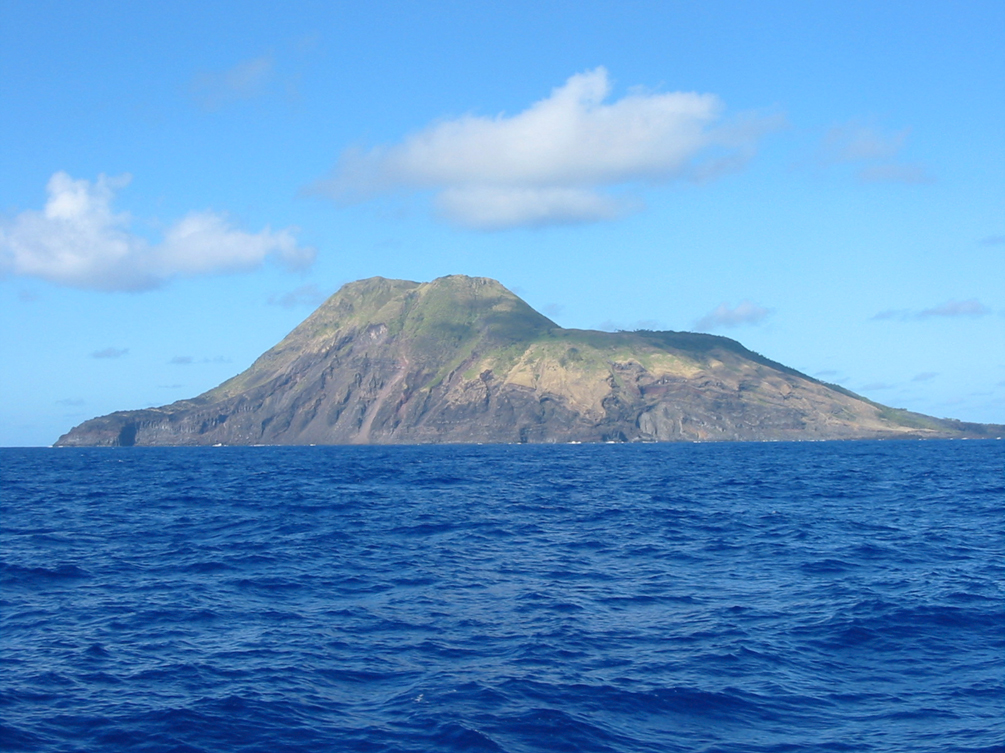
- Sarigan from the east

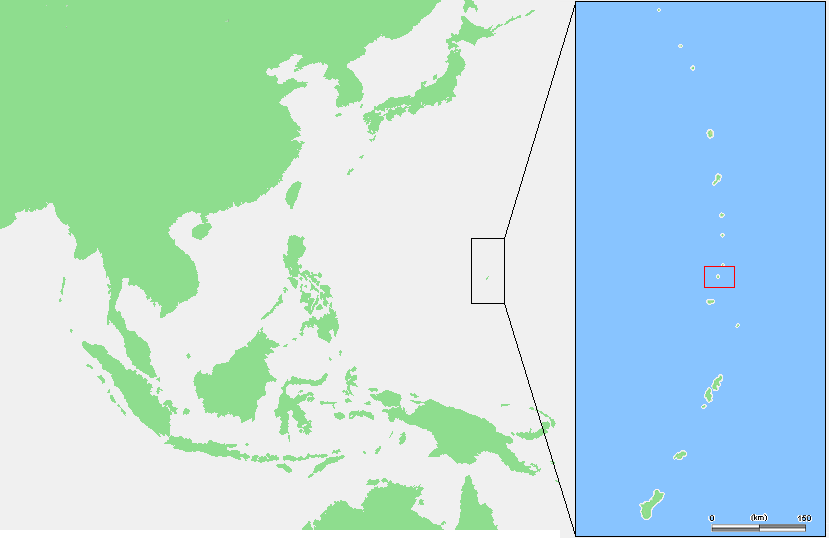

Geography
- Location: Pacific Ocean
- Coordinates: 16°42′N 145°47′E
- Archipelago: Northern Mariana Islands
- Area: 4.9 km^{2} (1.9 sq mi)
- Length: 2.7 km (1.68 mi)
- Width: 2.5 km (1.55 mi)
- Highest elevation: 538 m (1765 ft)

Administration
- United States
- Commonwealth: Northern Mariana Islands

Demographics
- Population: uninhabited - (2010)

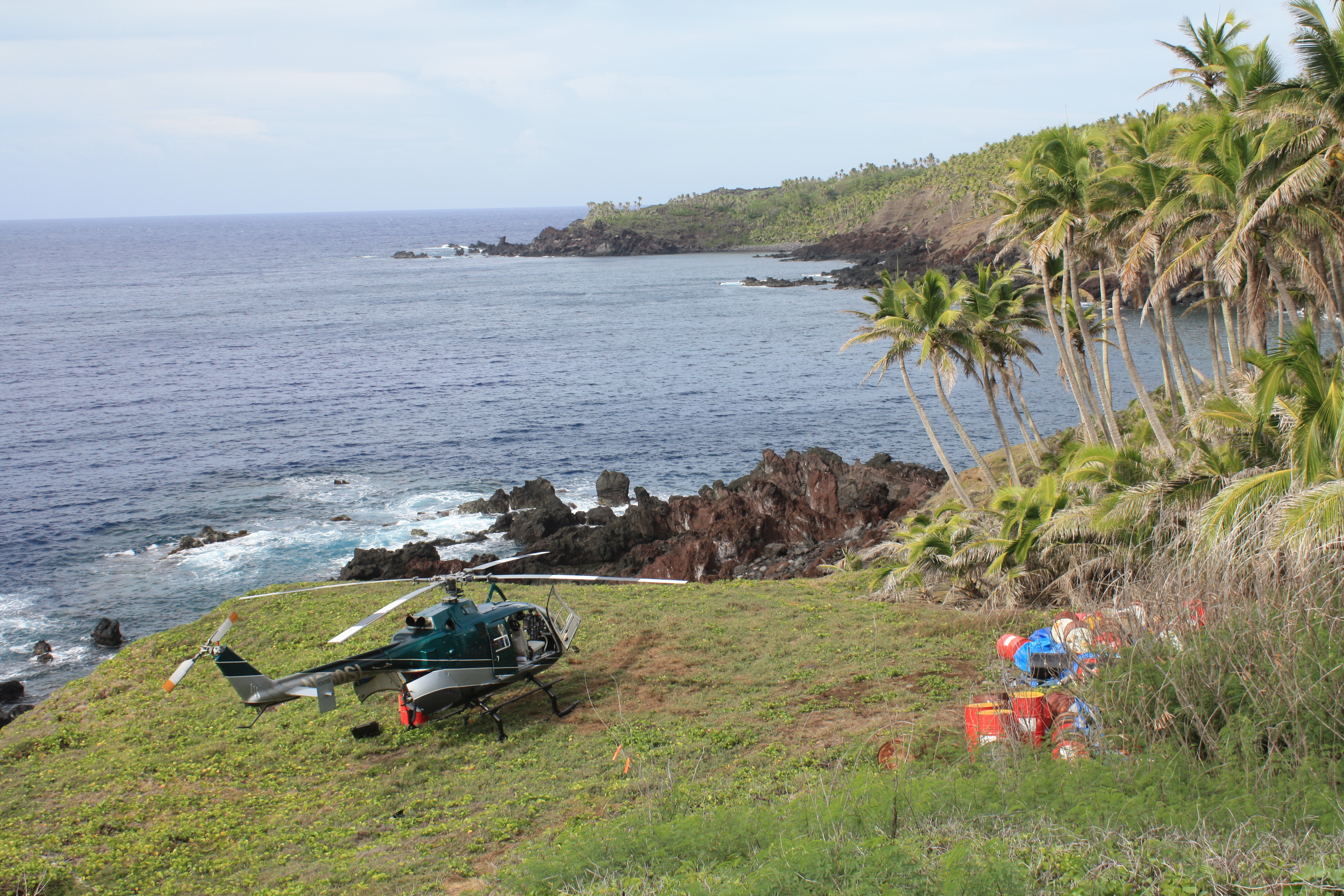
A biological survey party lands on Sarigan, 2010. Photo courtesy Michael Lusk.

Sarigan or Sariguan is an uninhabited volcanic island in the Pacific Ocean. It is part of the Northern Mariana Islands, a U.S. territory. Sarigan is located 37 kilometers (20 nmi) northeast of Anatahan island, 67 km (36 nmi) south of Guguan and 150 km (81 nmi) north of Saipan, the largest island in the Northern Marianas. The island has been sparsely populated, but in modern times has been uninhabited due to volcanic activity. It is currently a nature preserve.

== History ==
Sarigan was originally settled by the Chamorros. The island was first charted by Europeans in late October 1543 by Spanish explorer Bernardo de la Torre on board of the carrack San Juan de Letrán when trying to return from Sarangani to New Spain. In 1695, the natives were forcibly removed to Saipan, and three years later to Guam.

Following the sale of the Northern Marianas by Spain to the German Empire in 1899, Agrigan was administered as part of German New Guinea. The island was used as a penal colony from 1900 to 1906. The prisoners, who lived some with their families on Sarigan were mainly employed by the coconut plantations. In 1909, the island was leased by the Pagan Society, a German-Japanese partnership, which continued to export copra. The company also employed fowlers to hunt birds for feathers for export to Japan and Europe. However, the Pagan Society fell into financial difficulties from 1912.

During World War I, Sarigan came under the control of the Empire of Japan and was subsequently administered as part of the South Seas Mandate. In the 1930s, between 10 and 20 families lived on the island.

Following World War II, the island came under the control of the United States and the residents were removed from the island. As of 1947, the island was administered as part of the Trust Territory of the Pacific Islands. Since 1978, the island has been part of the Northern Islands Municipality of the Commonwealth of the Northern Mariana Islands.

Today, the island is a nature preserve, and in the mid-1990s, a project was launched to rid Sarigan of its population of feral animals; today, only a few cats remain. Sarigan has been proposed as a site for relocation of endangered birds from Guam and Saipan.

On May 28, 2010, a submarine volcano 7 mi (11 km) to the south erupted a brief cloud of steam and ash that briefly rose to 49,000 ft (15,000 m) and left a trail of pumice debris on the surface of the waters of the Pacific Ocean. Sarigan was declared off-limits by the government of the Northern Mariana Islands after the eruption.

== Geography ==
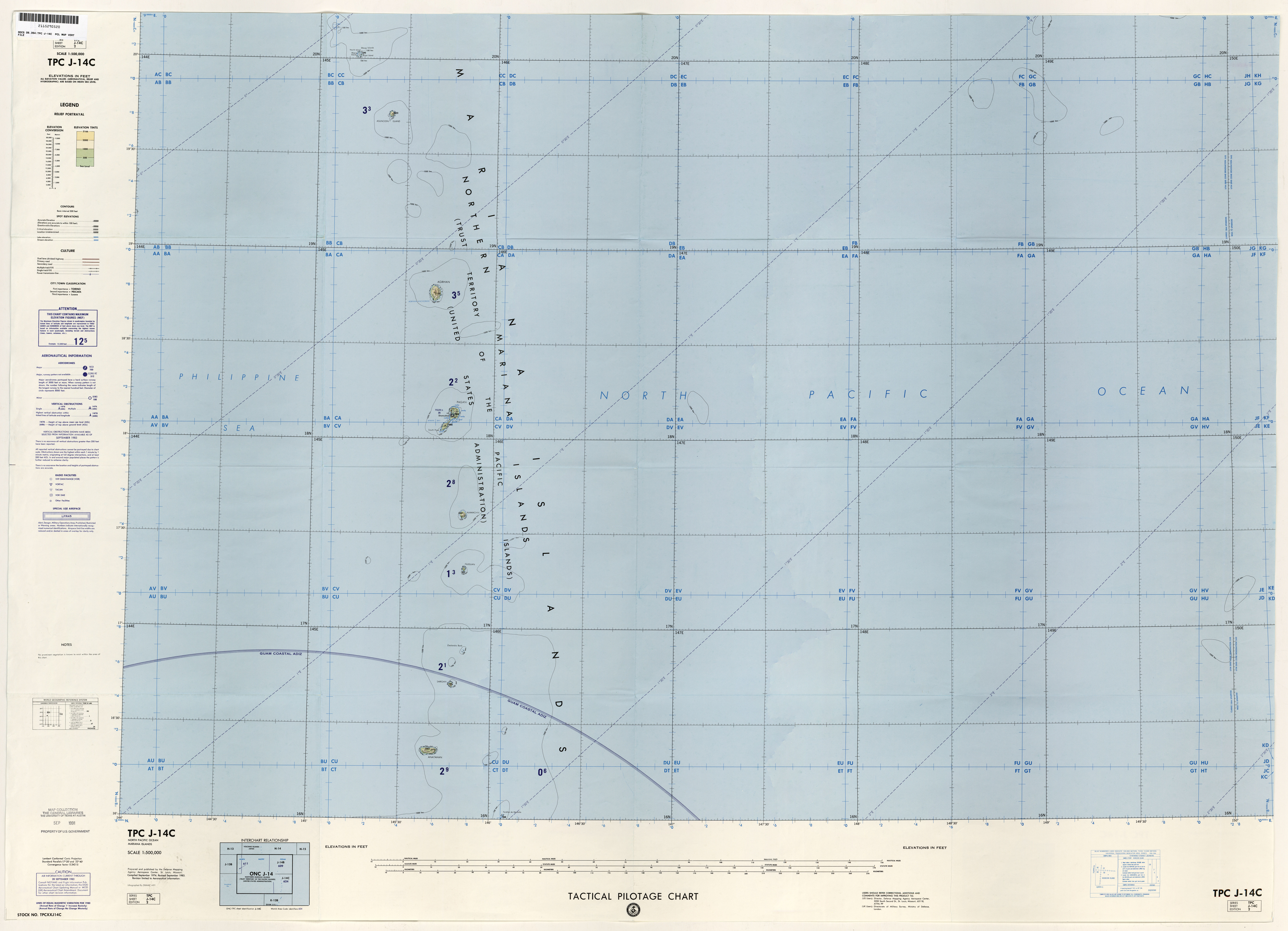
Map including Sarigan (DMA, 1983)

Sarigan is roughly triangular in shape, with a length of 2.7 kilometers (1.7 mi) and a width of 2.5 km (1.6 mi) and an area of 4.5 km^{2} (1.7 sq mi). The island is the summit of a stratovolcano which rises to an altitude of 494 m (1,621 ft) above sea level at its highest peak. The volcano is topped by a caldera, 750 meters in diameter, with an ash cone and two lava domes, which produced lava flows which reached the coast. No eruptions have been recorded in the historical period, although a swarm of volcano-tectonic earthquakes took place here in the summer of 2005.

Landing on Sarigan is difficult because perpendicular cliffs surround much of the island. It has many ravines and valleys with dense tropical vegetation, particularly on the northern side of the island. The stratovolcano is at the southern end of the island, and there is a plateau north of it with an elevation of 322 m (1,056 ft) and a width of .42 kilometers (0.26 mi). To the north of the plateau are steep, vegetation-covered slopes, which go down to the sea.

The island's north-western coast is the most habitable, climbing from an elevation of 0 m (0 ft) to 61 m (200 ft) in 0.24 km (0.15 mi) and having a lot of vegetation.

Approximately 12 km (6.5 nmi) south of Sarigan is the South Sarigan Seamount, a submarine volcano with several peaks, with a maximum height of 184 m below sea level. It briefly erupted in May 2010 producing a plume of water vapor about 12 km high.

=== Important Bird Area ===
The island has been recognised as an Important Bird Area (IBA) by BirdLife International because it supports populations of Micronesian megapodes, white-throated ground doves, Micronesian myzomelas and Micronesian starlings.
