= Marianas tropical dry forests =

Tropical dry broadleaf forests ecoregion of the Mariana Islands

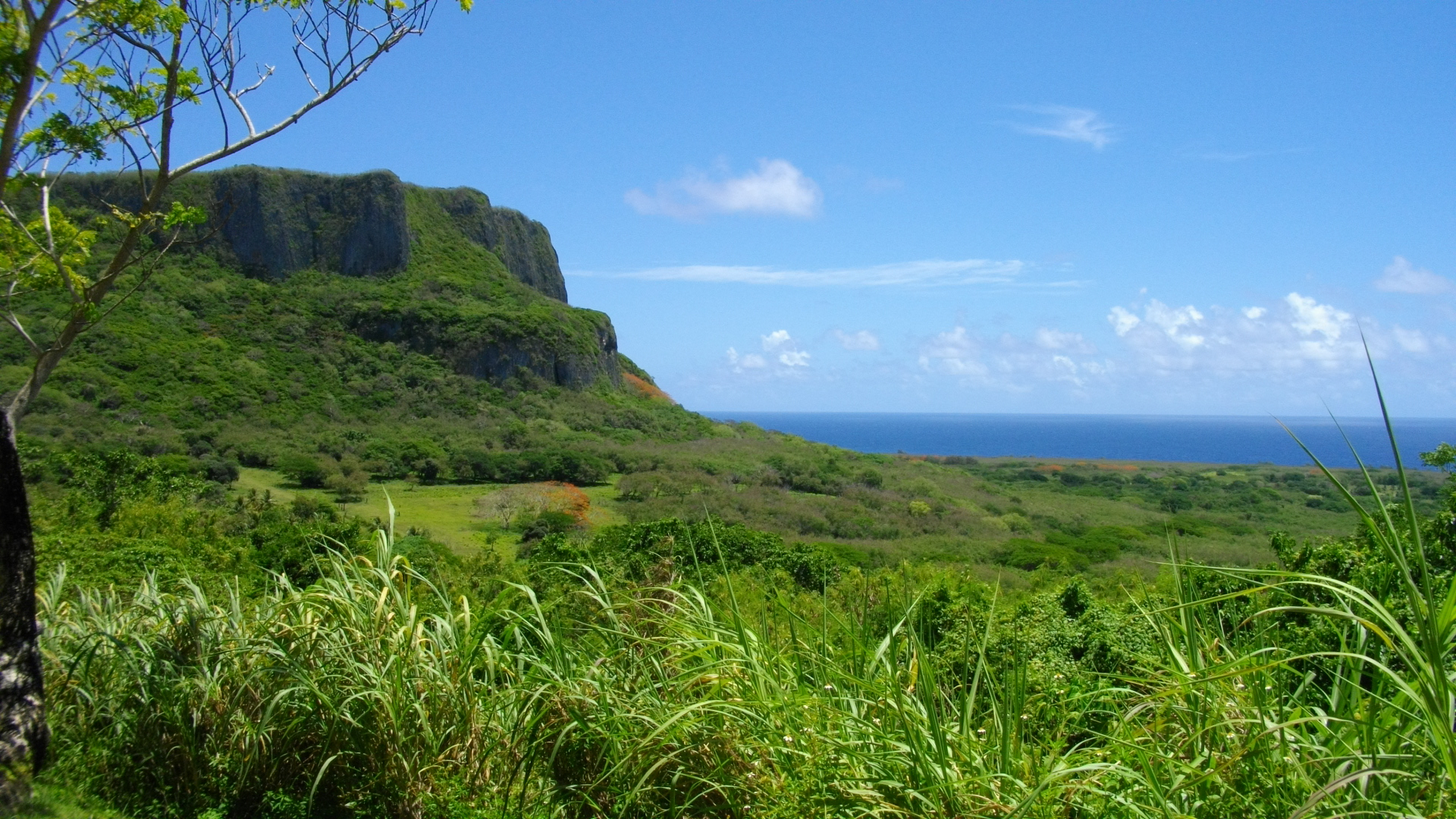
- Tropical dry forest on Saipan

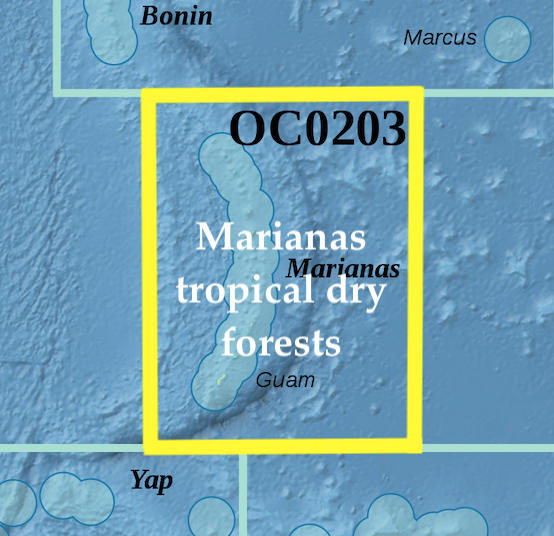
- Location of the ecoregion

Ecology
- Realm: Oceanian
- Biome: tropical and subtropical dry broadleaf forests
- Bird species: 59
- Mammal species: 2

Geography
- Area: 1,036 km^{2} (400 mi^{2})
- Country: United States
- Territories: Guam and the Northern Mariana Islands

Conservation
- Conservation status: Critical/endangered
- Habitat loss: 76.8%
- Protected: 15.51%

The Marianas tropical dry forests is a tropical and subtropical dry broadleaf forests ecoregion on the Marianas Islands in the western Pacific Ocean.

== Geography ==
The Marianas Islands extend 900 km north and south. The islands were formed by the subduction of the Pacific Plate under the Mariana Plate, and the Marianas Trench, the world's deepest, lies immediately east of the islands. The nine northern islands are volcanic and relatively young; Farallon de Pájaros, the northernmost, is an active stratovolcano. Several of the northern islands have experienced recent volcanic activity. Anatahan erupted in 2003, Pagan in 1981, and Asuncion and Guguan in 1906.

The southern islands are older, and are composed of volcanic rocks and marine limestone uplifted by the colliding plates. Guam, the southernmost island, is the largest. Other southern islands include Saipan, Tinian, and Rota.

Politically the islands are divided between the territory of Guam and the Commonwealth of the Northern Mariana Islands, both part of the United States.

== Climate ==
The climate of the Mariana Islands is tropical. Temperature varies little from season to season, and average monthly temperatures range from 24º to 27º C. Rainfall averages 2,000 and 2,500 mm annually and is strongly seasonal, with a wet season from July through October. Easterly trade winds are fairly constant, with an occasional weak westerly monsoon influence during the summer months.

== Flora ==
Plant communities on the northern islands include grassland on young volcanic soils. Older and lower-elevation lava flows are colonized by the tree Casuarina equisetifolia, known locally as gagu, and the fern Nephrolepsis hirsutula. Small patches of Pisonia grandis forest can be found on the four younger islands which are free of grazing goats.

The four larger northern islands, Agrihan, Pagan, Sarigan, and Anatahan, are home to remnant Aglaia–Elaeocarpus forests. The characteristic trees are mapunyao (Aglaia mariannensis) and yonga (Elaeocarpus joga). Mapunyao is endemic to the Marianas, and yonga is endemic to Micronesia. Mapunyao is dominant in the forest understory on both limestone and volcanic soils. Yonga is a large tree with a spreading crown, although the Marianas' frequent typhoons often limits their growth to 15 meters. Yonga's fleshy bright-blue berries are an important food for forest birds, particularly fruit doves.

Asuncion has a Terminalia forest, unique in the archipelago, whose principal species are endemic.

Most of the natural vegetation on the older southern islands has been cleared or altered by humans, but areas of primary and secondary forest remain. The plant communities vary with elevation and soils.

Areas with volcanic substrates have highly weathered lateritic clays (oxisols or ultisols) or very young inceptisols. The limestone terrain has thin to moderately thick soils, with areas of bare stone.

In the remnant primary limestone forests of Saipan Pisonia grandis is the dominant tree. Dendrocnide latifolia, Cynometra ramiflora, Intsia bijuga, and Erythrina variegata are very common, and Premna serratifolia, Ficus prolixa, and Ficus tinctoria. Meiogyne cylindrocarpa is a shrub or small tree common in the understory and infrequent in the canopy.

Most of Guam is covered by secondary forest. Patches of primary forest survive on the northern plateau and in inaccessible areas.

The limestone forests are of five types. In Artocarpus-Ficus forests, the tall wild breadfruit Artocarpus mariannensis and the banyan Ficus prolixa are co-dominant. Lower-stature Mammea forests, dominated by Mammea odorata, are found on the eastern escarpment. Cordia forests, dominated by Cordia subcordata, are found on steep slopes and cliffs. Merrilliodendron-Ficus forest is dominated by Merrilliodendron megacarpum and Ficus prolixa which form a canopy 30 to 45 meters high. Pandanus forest is dominated by Pandanus tectorius.

Vegetation on volcanic soils is predominantly grassland with forests growing in ravines. Ravine forest trees include Pandanus tectorius, P. dubuis, Hibiscus tiliaceus, Ficus prolixa, Phyllanthus mariannensis, and Premna serratifolia. Dense thickets of Leucaena leucocephala, a South American tree widely planted after World War II, are common.

Endemic plants include the endangered Serianthes nelsonii on Guam and Rota, Aglaia mariannensis, and Heritiera longipetiolata, which grows only in crevices on the limestone outcrops and cliffs of Saipan, Tinian, Rota, and Guam.

== Fauna ==
There are eight endemic species of birds in the Marianas – the Mariana fruit dove (Ptilinopus roseicapilla), Mariana swiftlet (Aerodramus bartschi), Guam rail (Hypotaenidia owstoni), Tinian monarch (Metabolus takatsukasae), Mariana crow (Corvus kubaryi), golden white-eye (Cleptornis marchei), Rota white-eye (Zosterops rotensis), and Saipan white-eye (Zosterops saypani). The Guam flycatcher (Myiagra freycineti) is extinct.

Limited-range species include the White-throated ground dove (Alopecoenas xanthonurus) of the Marianas and Yap; the Micronesian myzomela (Myzomela rubratra) of the Marianas, Caroline Islands, and Palau; the Caroline swiftlet (Aerodramus inquietus) of the Marianas and Carolines; and the Micronesian starling (Aplonis opaca) of the Marianas, Carolines, and Palau.

The endangered Marianas megapode (Megapodius laperouse laperouse) and the skink Emoia slevini are now found only in the Terminalia forests of Asuncion. However, there have been recent megapode sightings on Saipan and its adjacent islet of Managaha.

Guam's native bird and lizard species have been decimated by the Australasian brown tree snake (Boiga irregularis), which was introduced in the 1940s.

The two extant native mammal species are bats. The Marianas flying fox (Pteropus mariannus) lives on inaccessible vegetated limestone cliffs and volcanic ravine forests. The only Pacific sheath-tailed bats (Emballonura semicaudata) in the Marianas are found on Aguijan. The Guam flying fox (Pteropus tokudae) was last seen in the 1960s and is presumed extinct.

The islands are home to several endemic land snails, including Succinea piratarum and Succinea quadrasi.

== Protected areas ==
Protected areas include:

- Guam National Wildlife Refuge (4.93 km^{2}), established in 1993, protects a portion of Guam's northern coast.
- Bolanos Conservation Area (12 km^{2}) on southern Guam
- Asuncion Island Preserve (7.29 km^{2}) on Asuncion Island
- Guguan Island Preserve (4.24 km^{2}) on Guguan
- Sabana Protected Area (15.21 km^{2}) on Rota
- I Chenchon Park Wildlife Conservation Area and Bird Sanctuary (3.29 km^{2}) on Rota
- Wedding Cake Mountain Wildlife Conservation Area (1.21 km^{2}) on Rota
- Kagman Conservation Area (1.63 km^{2}) on Saipan
