= Aguijan =

Island in the Northern Marianas island chain

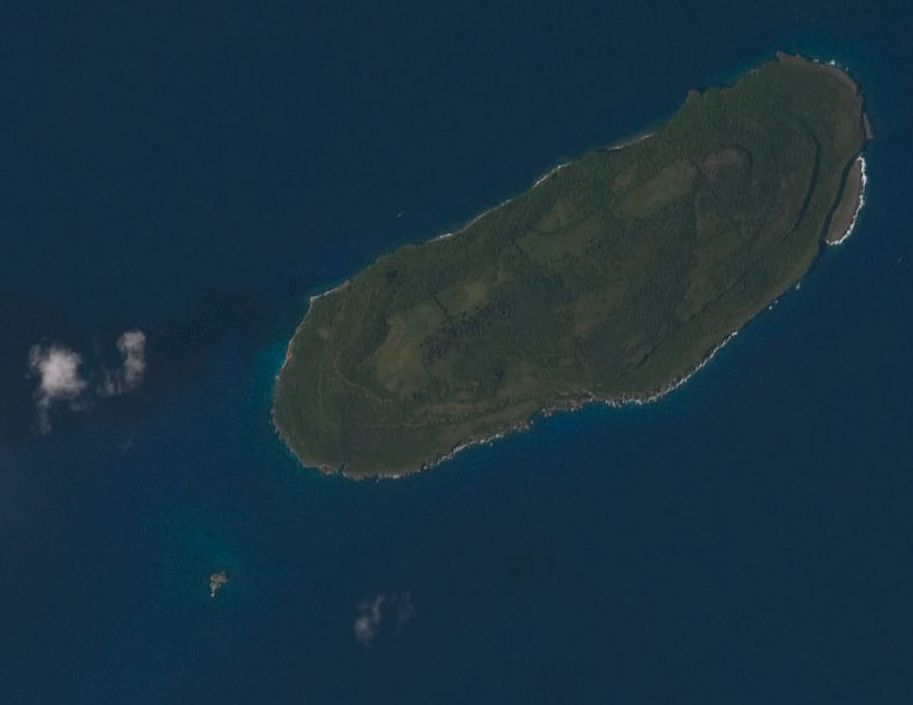
- Satellite view, with Naftan Rock visible to the southwest

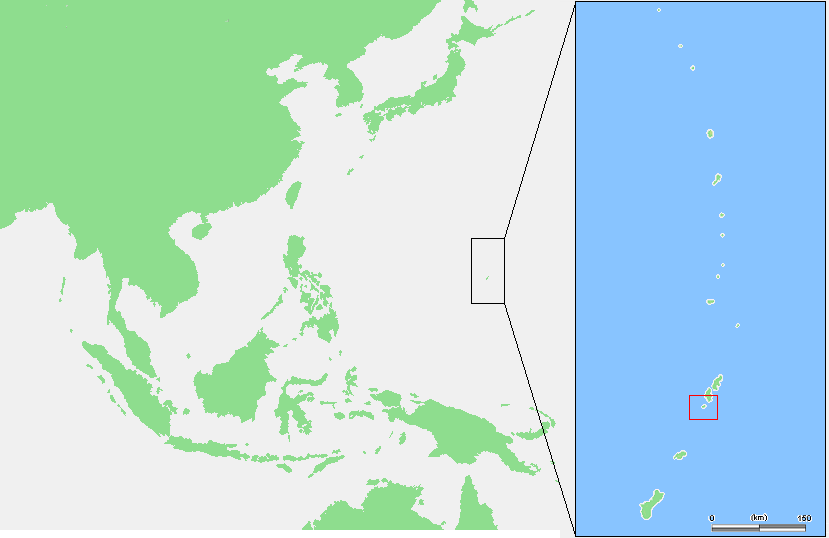

Geography
- Location: Pacific Ocean
- Coordinates: 14°51′13″N 145°33′34″E
- Archipelago: Northern Mariana Islands
- Area: 7.01 km^{2} (2.71 sq mi)
- Length: 4.7 km (2.92 mi)
- Width: 1.8 km (1.12 mi)
- Highest elevation: 157 m (515 ft)

Administration
- United States
- Commonwealth: Northern Mariana Islands

Demographics
- Population: 25 (2022)

Aguijan (/æɡɪˈjɑːn/; Spanish: Aguiján [aɡiˈxan]; also Aguiguan and Aguihan, based on the Spanish rendition of the native name), and sometimes referred to Goat Island, is a small, uninhabited, bean-shaped coralline island in the Mariana Islands in the Pacific Ocean. It is situated 8 kilometers (5.0 mi; 4.3 nmi) southwest of Tinian, from which it is separated by the Tinian Channel. Aguijan and Tinian together form Tinian Municipality, one of the four main political divisions that comprise the Commonwealth of the Northern Mariana Islands. Aguijan is inhabited by wild goats and is the last known habitat of a rare bat, and many species of birds live on the island. During the Pacific campaign of World War II, a Japanese garrison was on the island which surrendered at the end of the war in 1945 without a battle. Access to the island is inhibited by the lack of a natural harbor. The 2010 and 2020 United States censuses both reported its population as 0.

== History ==
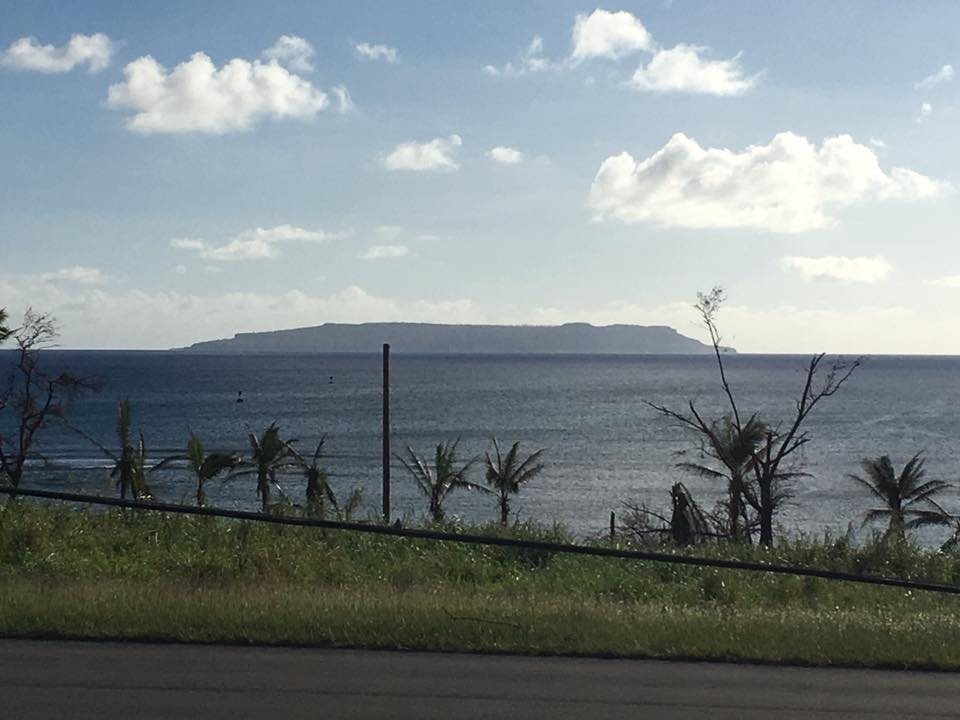
Aguijan, viewed from the southern end of Tinian

The first sighting of Aguijan by Europeans likely occurred during the Spanish expedition of 1519–1522 of Ferdinand Magellan or by its continuation by Gonzalo Gómez de Espinosa. The Spaniards charted it as Santo Ángel. The Spanish missionary Diego Luis de San Vitores visited it in 1669. Aguijan was administered as part of the Spanish East Indies from the 16th century to 1899, when Spain sold its possessions in the Mariana Islands to the German Empire. Under Germany, it was administered as part of German New Guinea.

During World War I (1914–1918), Aguijan came under the control of the Empire of Japan in 1914 and after that Japan administered it as part of the South Seas Mandate. During the Pacific campaign (1941–1945) of World War II, the Imperial Japanese Army maintained a garrison on Aguijan. The garrison surrendered to Allied forces on September 4, 1945, two days after the surrender of Japan; United States Navy Rear Admiral Marshall R. Greer received the surrender of Japanese Second Lieutenant Kinichi Yamada aboard a United States Coast Guard Cutter, the patrol boat USCG 83525, which became the only United States Coast Guard vessel to host a surrender.

Following World War II, Aguijan came under the control of the United Nations and was administered on its behalf by the United States as part of the Trust Territory of the Pacific Islands. Since 1978, the island has been part of the Commonwealth of the Northern Mariana Islands, which became an unincorporated territory and commonwealth of the United States in 1986.

== Geography ==
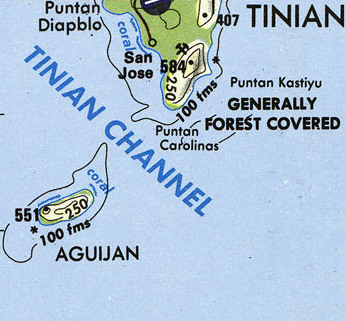
Aguijan is separated from Tinian by Tinian Channel (1988 map)

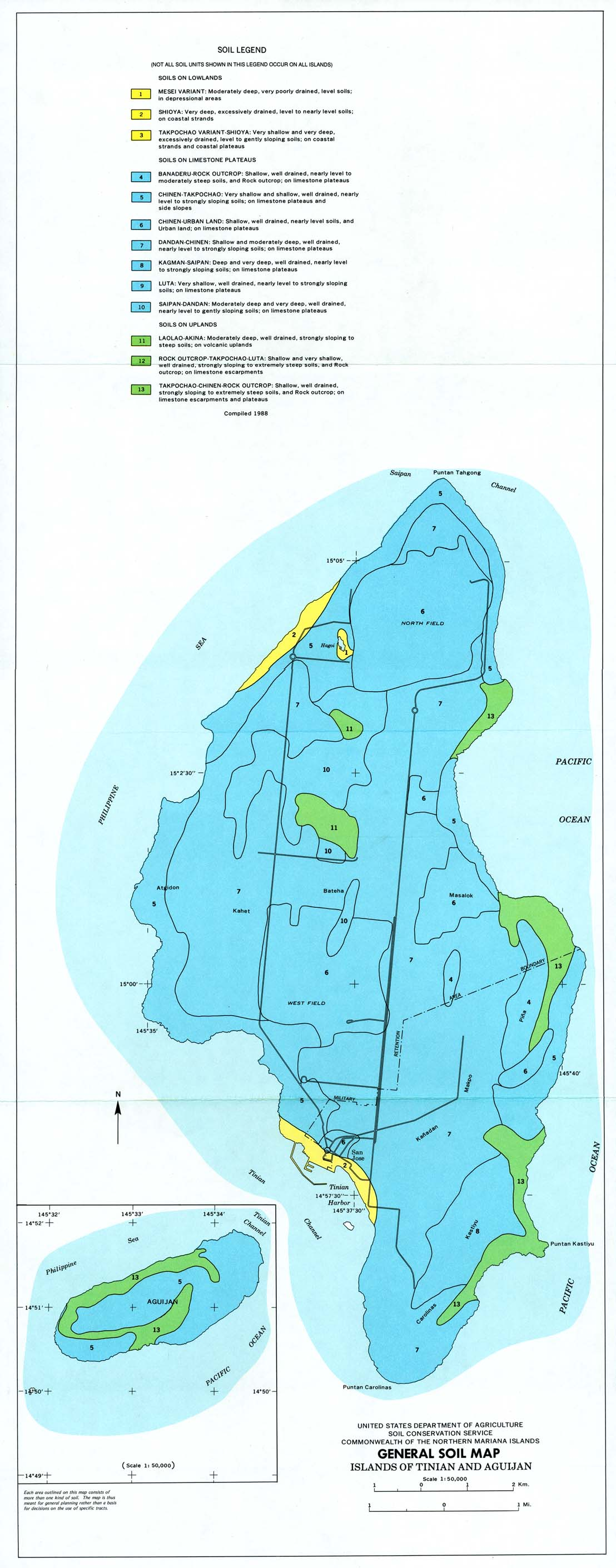
Map of soil types on the islands of Tinian and Aguijan

Aguijan is only 7.09 square kilometers (2.74 sq mi) in size, with a length of 4.7 km (2.9 mi) and a width of 1.8 km (1.1 mi). It is covered by a mix of forests and fields. Due to its sheer steep cliffs, the island has no natural harbors, bays, or beaches, making boat landings difficult, and it has no permanent human population.

The Tastumi fishing bank is in the vicinity of Aguijan.

=== Naftan Rock ===
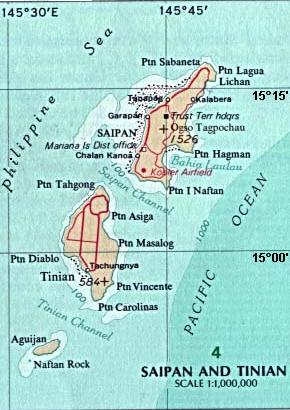
Map including Naftan Rock

Approximately 1 kilometer (0.6 mi; 0.5 nmi) off the southwest shore of Aguijan is Naftan Rock (14°50′5.32″N 145°31′59.53″E). It is 18 meters (59 ft) in elevation.

In 1944, the United States armed forces began using Naftan Rock as a bombing range. The devastation the bombing caused to the islet's seabird population and the difficulties it created for local fishermen prompted residents of the area in 1968 to ask the U.S. armed forces to use Farallon de Medinilla for target practice instead. Accordingly, bombing practice moved to Farallon de Medinilla in October 1971.

== Flora and fauna ==
Aguijan is home to many species native to the Mariana Islands, including many species of birds which include some rare bird species. A 2002 survey of Aguijan found a handful of native species on the island, including the Micronesian megapode (Megapodius laperouse), the Mariana fruit bat (Pteropus mariannus), and the Pacific (or Polynesian) sheath-tailed bat (Emballonura semicaudata rotensis). The Pacific sheath-tailed bat historically occurred on the islands of Aguijan, Guam, Rota, and Tinian. It currently only occupies areas on the island of Aguijan. In 2015, the Pacific sheath-tailed bat was listed by the U.S. Fish and Wildlife Service as an endangered species under the Endangered Species Act of 1973, as amended. Currently the worldwide population size of the subspecies is approximately 400 individuals all occurring on the island of Aguijan.

BirdLife International recognizes Aguijan and Naftan Rock as an Important Bird Area (IBA) because they support populations of Micronesian megapodes, white-throated ground doves, Mariana fruit doves, Mariana swiftlets (Endangered), Micronesian myzomelas, rufous fantails, Aguijan reed warblers, golden and Saipan white-eyes, and Micronesian starlings. Aguijan also supports seabird breeding colonies, with 120 pairs of brown boobies and 450 pairs of brown noddies reported, while Naftan Rock is home to several thousand seabirds.

By the mid-19th century goats had been introduced to the island, and it has become known for its population of feral goats, which number over 1,000.

In the 1930s people made an attempt to grow sugar cane on the island, and areas of it were cleared for this purpose.

== See also ==
- Tinian Naval Base
