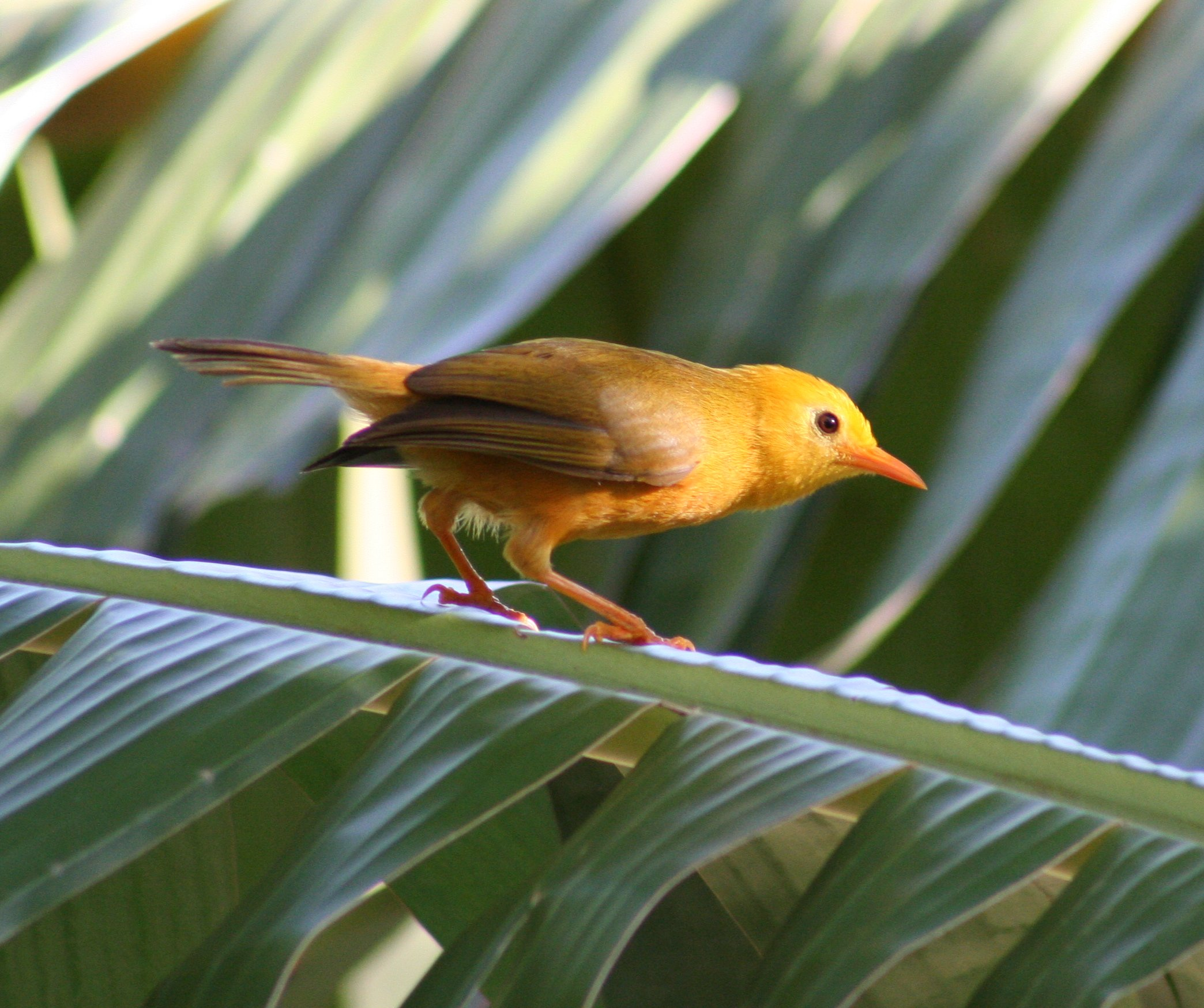

Conservation status
- Endangered (IUCN 3.1)

Scientific classification
- Kingdom: Animalia
- Phylum: Chordata
- Class: Aves
- Order: Passeriformes
- Family: Zosteropidae
- Genus: Cleptornis; Oustalet, 1889
- Species: C. marchei

Binomial name
- Cleptornis marchei (Oustalet, 1889)

Synonyms
- Ptilotis marchei

= Golden white-eye =

Bird in the white-eye family

The golden white-eye (Cleptornis marchei) is a species of bird in the white-eye family, Zosteropidae. It is the only species within the genus Cleptornis. The golden white-eye was once considered to be a honeyeater in the family Meliphagidae and although it is now known to be a white-eye, its position within that family is still uncertain. The species is restricted to the islands of Saipan and Aguijan in the Northern Mariana Islands, where it is sympatric (shares its range) and competes with the related bridled white-eye. The golden white-eye has golden plumage and a pale eye-ring. It feeds on insects, fruit, and nectar and forages in pairs or small family groups. The bird is monogamous and lays two eggs in a small cup nest.

Fossil evidence shows the golden white-eye once also occurred on Tinian and Rota but was extirpated in those locations through the impact of human activities. Despite its current abundance on Saipan and Aguijan, and the fact that it has among the highest recorded densities for any bird, it is nevertheless considered to be Endangered. It is threatened by the invasive brown tree snake, which has become established on nearby Guam, and this predator is expected to cause a rapid decline in the population if it reaches Saipan. Efforts are under way to control the snakes and breed the white-eye in zoos.

== Taxonomy ==
The species was once called the golden honeyeater as it was considered to be a honeyeater (Meliphagidae). It was placed within the genus Ptilotis by French naturalist Émile Oustalet when he described the species in 1889; that genus is now considered defunct and is no longer used. It was subsequently moved into the genus Cleptornis, which had been provisionally established by Oustalet in case the species proved to be distinct. Behavioural and morphological characteristics led American ornithologist Harold Douglas Pratt, Jr., to suggest in 1987 that it was related to the white-eyes.

Subsequent studies have supported the idea that this species was a white-eye. It is possibly most closely related to the Micronesian white-eyes of the genus Rukia, or the monotypic Bonin white-eye (Apalopteron), another species once placed with the honeyeaters and subsequently moved to the white-eyes. The golden white-eye has a long 10th primary feather (one of the flight feathers), unlike other white-eyes where that primary is reduced or absent, which has led to the alternative suggestion that it is basal (an early offshoot) among the white-eyes.

Its generic name, Cleptornis, is derived from the Ancient Greek kleptes, a robber or thief, and ornis, a bird. This is not a reference to any aspect of the golden white-eye's behaviour, but to the old French name of the Mariana Islands, les Îles des Voleurs, or Robbers' Islands. The specific epithet marchei refers to the French explorer and writer Antoine-Alfred Marche, who procured the original specimens.

== Distribution and habitat ==
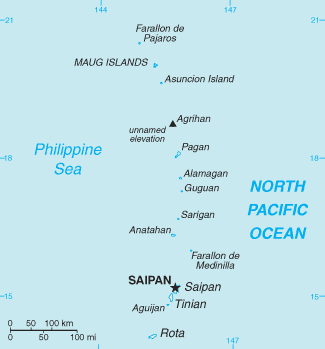
The golden white-eye is distributed on Saipan and Aguijan in the Northern Mariana Islands.

The golden white-eye is endemic to the Northern Mariana Islands in the western Pacific Ocean, where it currently occurs on the islands of Saipan and Aguijan. Within its range, it occupies a variety of habitats, both natural and man-made. It is common in native forests, particularly limestone forests, but also occurs in open shrubland and suburban areas. On Saipan, the only habitats it is absent from are the marshes around Lake Susupe and grassy savannas.

== Description ==
The golden white-eye differs from the other white-eyes in having large eyes and an outermost primary wing feather that is not reduced (as it is in the other species). It is a large white-eye, 14 cm (5.5 in) long and weighing around 20 g (0.7 oz). The species has bright, unmistakable plumage, with: an orange-yellow head coupled with a pale eye-ring; a yellow-green back, wings, and tail; and golden orange undersides. The bill and legs are also orange. The plumage of both sexes is similar; the males can be told from the females only when examined in the hand, since the males have longer wings than the females. The juveniles have similar plumage, though duller than the adults', with brownish patches on the face and neck and brown-yellow streaks on the breast. Juveniles also have dusky bills and dull legs.

The golden white-eye makes a variety of calls. The song is a long raspy warble, rendered as "séé mé-can you séé mé-I can séé yóú-can you séé mé". The species also makes rasping shorter calls and whistles when in flocks and in flight. Chicks give plaintive whistles when begging for food from adults.

== Behaviour ==
Like other white-eyes, the golden white-eye is diurnal. In contrast to the bridled white-eye, which forages in groups and is not territorial, the golden white-eye occurs in pairs or small family groups consisting of a breeding pair and fledged young. The golden white-eye is also territorial, and pairs will sing throughout the day in response to neighbouring pairs. Groups can become aggressive when they encounter one another. The golden white-eye is also aggressive towards the smaller bridled white-eye, chasing it away from food and perches and flying through flocks of them in order to disperse them. While it chases other forest passerines, it is less aggressive towards them, and in fact the rufous fantail seeks out the golden white-eye, foraging behind it to snatch insects flushed by the latter species. The golden white-eye is socially dominant over the bridled white-eyes and rufous fantails, but it is subordinate to the Micronesian myzomela and is chased by that species. It is also occasionally chased by the fantails if it approaches their nests too closely.

=== Diet and feeding ===
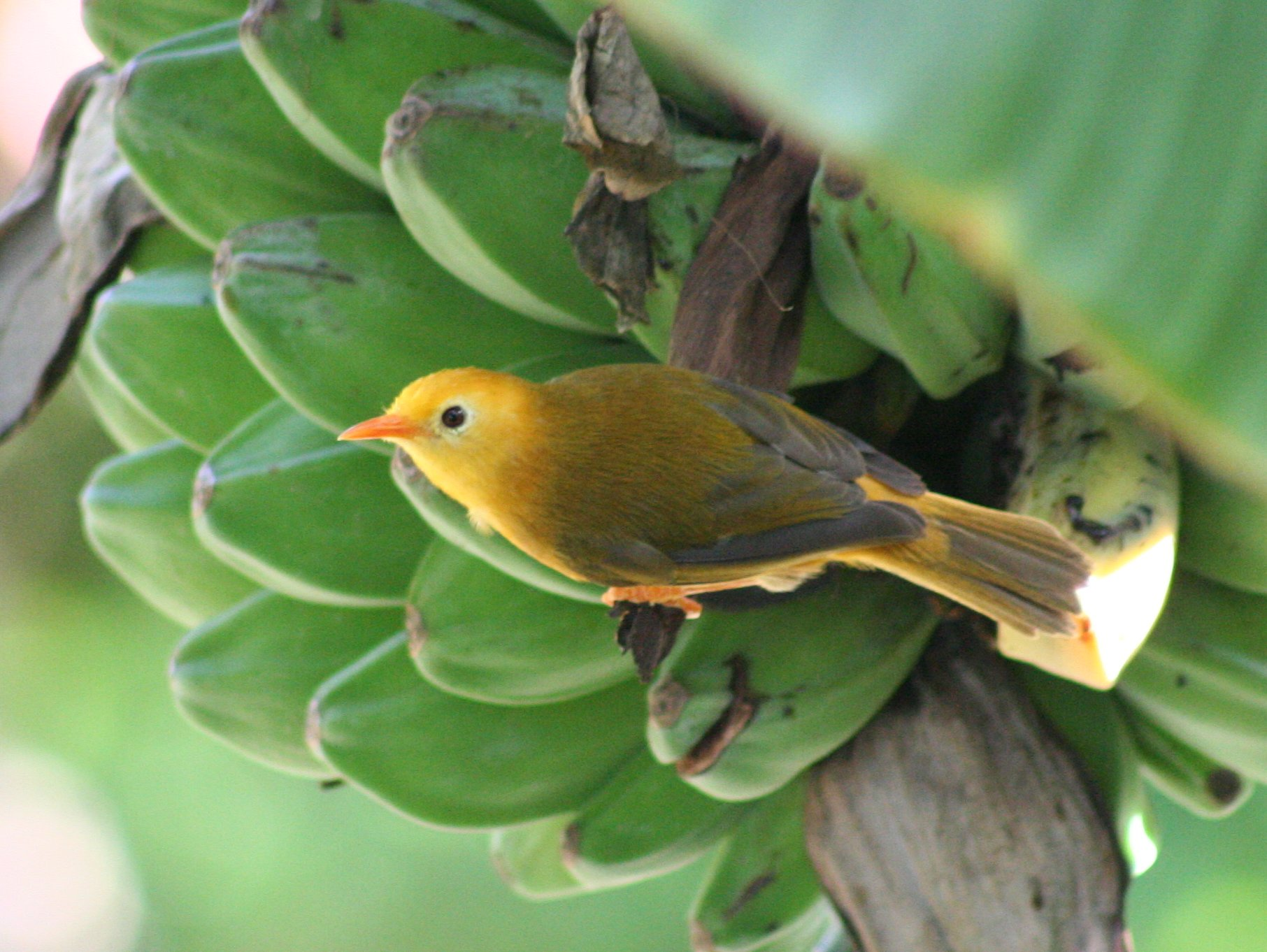
A golden white-eye feeding on bananas

The golden white-eye is a generalist, feeding on fruit, berries, and insects. Nectar forms part of the diet, and, along with the Micronesian myzomela and the bridled white-eye, the golden white-eye is a pollinator of some trees, albeit not one as important as these other species. Insects may be either gleaned from the bark of trees and from leaves, or caught in the air. Certain tree species are preferred as foraging habitat. The common forest tree Cynometra ramifolia is the most favoured tree and used more frequently than the equally common Guamia mariannae. There is considerable overlap between this species' foraging range and that of the bridled white-eye, but the golden white-eye is more generalised in its diet. Within the forest there is some partitioning of niche, with bridled white-eyes (and Micronesian myzomelas) feeding primarily in the forest canopy, and the golden white-eye feeding in both the canopy and understory of the forest, as well as a variety of smaller trees and bushes. It shares the understory with the rufous fantail, which has a different feeding technique. At a smaller scale additional partitioning occurs. The golden white-eye shows differences in the preferred microhabitat for obtaining insects, for example, feeding in dead leaves and branches, whereas the bridled white-eye prefers gleaning insects on live leaves. It is the most generalised of all the extant forest passerines on Saipan. It has been suggested that the versatility in diet and foraging technique is an adaptation to the challenges presented by typhoons, which can dramatically alter the structure of the forest.

=== Breeding ===
Breeding occurs throughout the year on Saipan, where the species' nesting behaviour has been studied. The peak breeding period seems to be from March to July. The species is monogamous. The nests are simple undecorated cups of casuarina needles, grasses, and vines. These are placed around 2.9 m (between 1.5 and 6.5 m) off the ground in a variety of trees including Casuarina, Guamia, Cynometra, Leucaena, and Citrus. The nests are predated by other bird species, specifically Micronesian starlings and collared kingfishers, as well as the introduced green tree skink.

The typical clutch size is two eggs, 20.3 × 15.1 mm in size, which are pale blueish green with red or brown splotches that are concentrated around the wider end. Both sexes share the incubation duties, with each parent incubating for stints of around 25 minutes before being relieved. This species is extremely territorial around the nest, chasing away other birds, including bridled white-eyes, rufous fantails, and other golden white-eyes. From laying it takes about two weeks for the eggs to hatch. The hatchlings are altricial, in other words naked and helpless. Both parents share the brooding and feeding duties, and take away faecal sacs to keep the nest clean. The diet of the chicks is almost exclusively composed of insects and caterpillars. Chicks fledge around 10–14 days after hatching. After fledging they may remain with their parents in small groups for some time.

== Threats and conservation ==
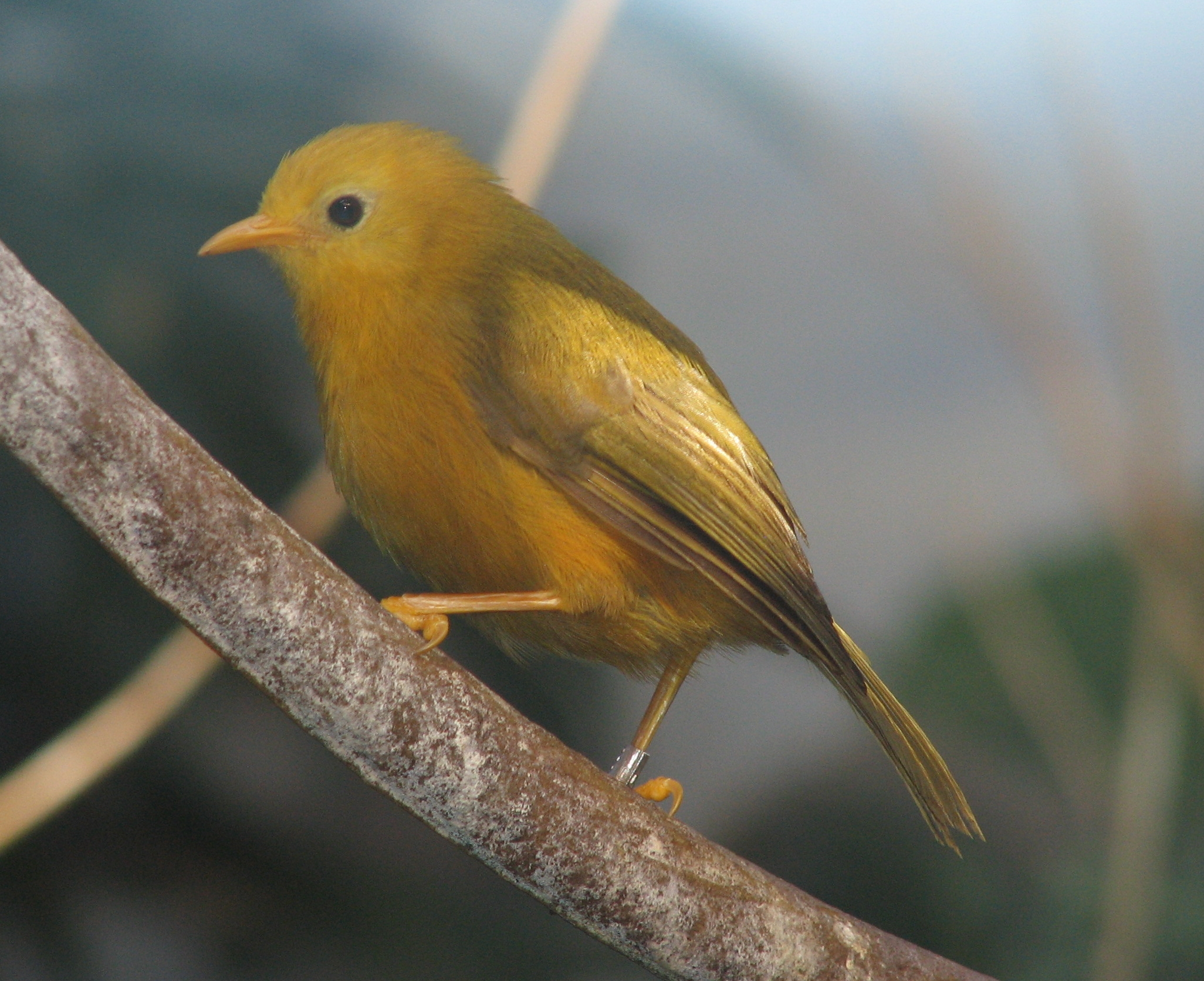
Captive breeding is being attempted in some zoos to safeguard the future of this species.

The range of the golden white-eye has contracted considerably since the arrival of humans in the Mariana Islands. Fossil bones of this species have been found on the nearby islands of Tinian and Rota, and it may once have occurred on Guam and other islands in the Marianas.

At present the golden white-eye is very common, and in fact a 1996 study found that their densities on Saipan were among the highest recorded for any bird, up to 2,095 birds/km² (8.47 per acre). It was believed that Saipan cannot sustain a larger population of this white-eye than it already does. A 2009 study, which incorporated results from a 2007 survey, found that the species had declined between 1982 and 2007, in common with two other species on Saipan, the rufous fantail and the nightingale reed warbler. All three species are insectivorous and were theorised to have declined due to habitat loss. Nevertheless, the species remained relatively abundant, and the current world population is estimated at around 71,997 birds.

The species is nonetheless evaluated as Endangered by the IUCN because the population is expected to undergo a rapid decline if the brown tree snake becomes established on Saipan. The primary threat to this species is the brown tree snake, a native of Australia, New Guinea and the Solomon Islands, which eliminated all 12 landbird species on nearby Guam after being accidentally introduced. The snake has not yet become established on Saipan, one of the two islands that compose the range of the golden white-eye, and which holds the largest population of the species. The isolation of Aguijan makes the introduction of brown tree snakes there unlikely, but the small population there is vulnerable as the island is only 718 ha (1774 acres) in size and a direct hit by a supertyphoon could wipe them out. Efforts are under way to breed the species in captivity and to prevent the snakes from being introduced and established on Saipan. Six zoos have recently received this species and breeding was expected to begin by 2011. Success came more quickly, and the first captive birds were bred in 2009 in the North Carolina Zoo. Birds from captive breeding will be introduced on new islands. In addition, 24 birds were translocated from Saipan to the island of Sarigan, a predator-free island reserve, in 2011 in the hope of establishing a breeding population.
