= Asuncion Island =

Island in the Northern Mariana Islands chain in the Pacific Ocean

Asuncion
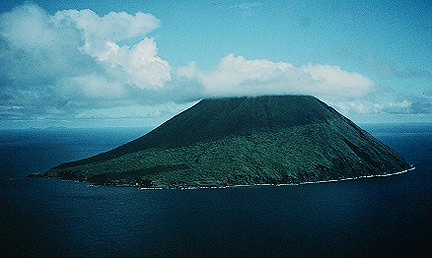
- United States Geological Survey photo of Asuncion Island.

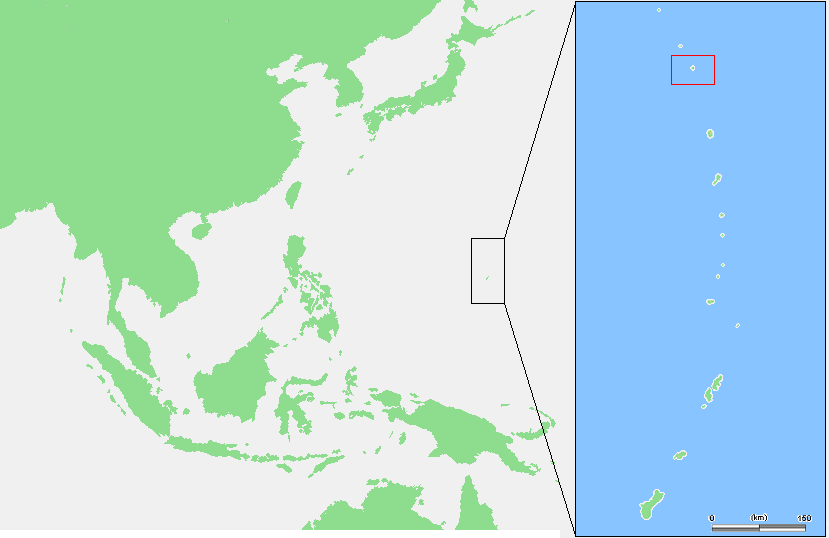

Geography
- Location: Pacific Ocean
- Coordinates: 19°41′33″N 145°24′13″E
- Archipelago: Northern Mariana Islands
- Area: 7.86 km^{2} (3.03 sq mi)
- Length: 3.3 km (2.05 mi)
- Width: 3 km (1.9 mi)
- Highest elevation: 857 m (2812 ft)
- Highest point: Mount Asuncion

Administration
- United States
- Commonwealth: Northern Mariana Islands

Demographics
- Population: 0 (2010)

Asuncion (from Spanish meaning "assumption" in reference to the Spanish explorers belief in the "Assumption" of the Holy Virgin Mary) is an island in the Mariana Islands chain in the Pacific Ocean. The island is uninhabited. Asuncion is situated 101 kilometers (63 mi; 55 nmi) northwest of Agrihan and 37 km (23 mi; 20 nmi) southeast of the Maug Islands. The island is part of the Commonwealth of the Northern Mariana Islands.

== History ==
The Spanish sailor Gonzalo de Vigo, who deserted from Ferdinand Magellan's expedition in 1521 and became the first European castaway in the history of the Pacific, probably was the first European to visit Asuncion in 1522. From a European perspective, however, Asuncion was discovered in 1669 by the Spanish missionary Diego Luis de San Vitores, who gave it its present name. The Spaniards, who governed the Mariana Islands as part of the Spanish East Indies beginning in the 16th century, forcibly removed Asuncion's native Chamorros to Saipan in 1695 and then to Guam in 1698.

In 1899, Spain sold Asuncion along with the rest of the Mariana Islands (except for Guam, which the United States had seized from Spain in 1898) to the German Empire under the terms of the German–Spanish Treaty. The formalities of the cession took place on November 17, 1899, on Saipan. Germany administered Asuncion as part of German New Guinea. In 1903, the Germans leased the island to a Japanese company which hunted birds for feathers for export to Japan and from there to Paris. Six Japanese hunters died of disease on the island in 1910.

During World War I (1914–1918), Asuncion came under the control of the Empire of Japan in 1914. The Japanese subsequently administered the island as part of the South Seas Mandate. Following the Pacific campaign (1941–1945) of World War II, the island came under the control of the United Nations and was administered on its behalf by the United States as part of the Trust Territory of the Pacific Islands. In 1978, the island became part of the Northern Islands Municipality of the Commonwealth of the Northern Mariana Islands, which in turn became an unincorporated territory and commonwealth of the United States in 1986.

In 1985, per the Constitution of the Commonwealth of the Northern Mariana Islands, the island was designated as a wilderness area for the protection and conservation of natural resources. Since 2009, the island has been part of the Marianas Trench Marine National Monument of the United States.

== Geography ==
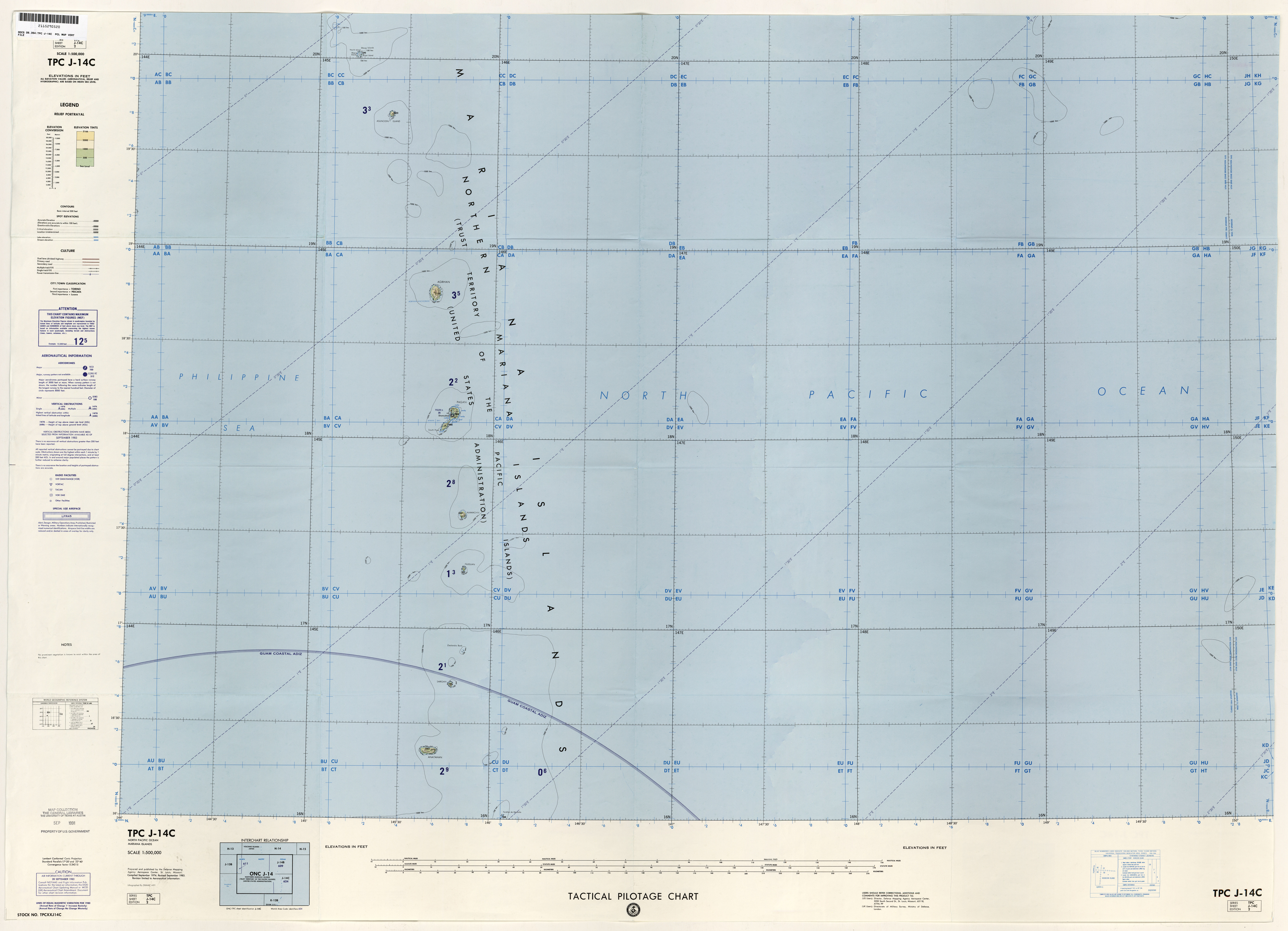
Map including Asuncion Island (DMA, 1983)

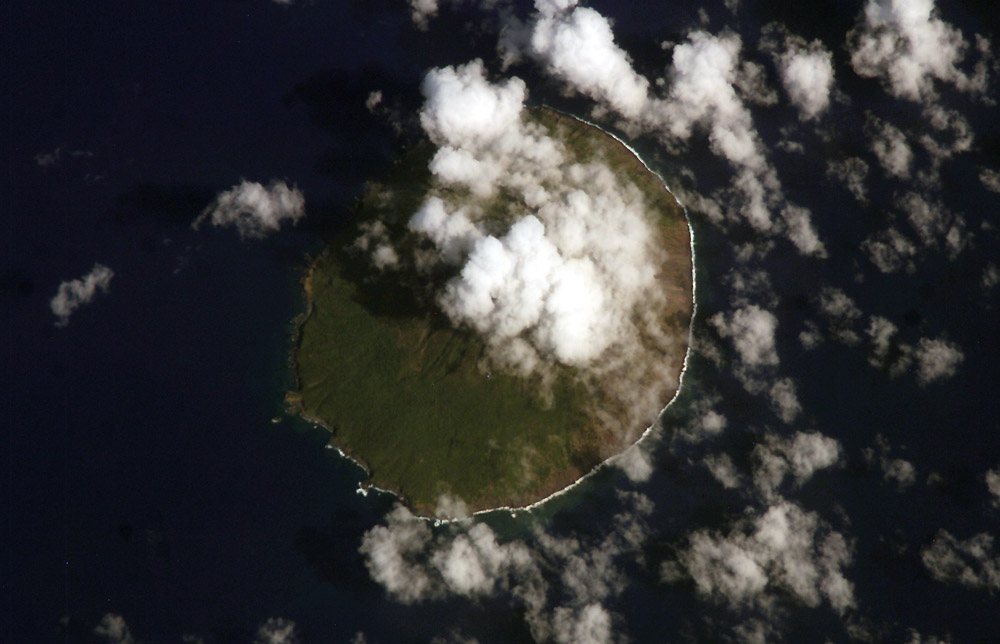
Asuncion Island

Asuncion is a densely forested island, roughly elliptical in shape, with a length of 3.3 kilometers (2.1 mi), a width of 3 km (1.9 mi), and an area of 7.9 km^{2} (3.1 sq mi). Coastlines generally are rocky.

The entire island is a massive Holocene stratovolcano which rises from the ocean floor to a height of 857 m (2,812 ft) above sea level. The volcano, which last erupted in 1906, is asymmetrical, with steep northeast slopes terminating in high cliffs. The southwestern slopes are shallower and meet the sea in low cliffs.

=== Vegetation ===
Despite being a relatively young island, Asuncion is remarkable for having the most well-developed native forest among the Mariana Islands north of Saipan owing to its protection from wind on the lee side of its mountain. It features a unique forest type dominated by the endemic tree Terminalia rostrata. Other vegetation includes grasslands composed of swordgrass (Miscanthus floridulus) on the upper slopes and forests of coconut palm (Cocos nucifera) mixed with some Pandanus trees and papaya trees (Carica papaya) on the lower slopes, along with native Pisonia.

=== Important Bird Area ===
The island has been recognized as an Important Bird Area (IBA) by BirdLife International because it supports populations of Micronesian megapodes, white-throated ground doves, Micronesian myzomelas, and Micronesian starlings.

== See also ==
- List of stratovolcanoes
- Terminalia rostrata
