= Tinian Channel =

Channel in the Northern Mariana Islands

Coordinates: 15.0000°N 145.6330°E

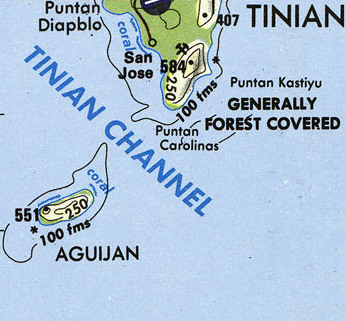
Aguiguan is separated from Tinian by Tinian Channel (1988 map)

The Tinian Channel is an eight kilometre-wide channel in the Northern Mariana Islands. It lies to the south of the island of Tinian (15°00'N., 145°38'E.) is northeast of Aguijan Island, separating it from the island of Aguijan. Together, the two islands form the Tinian Municipality.
