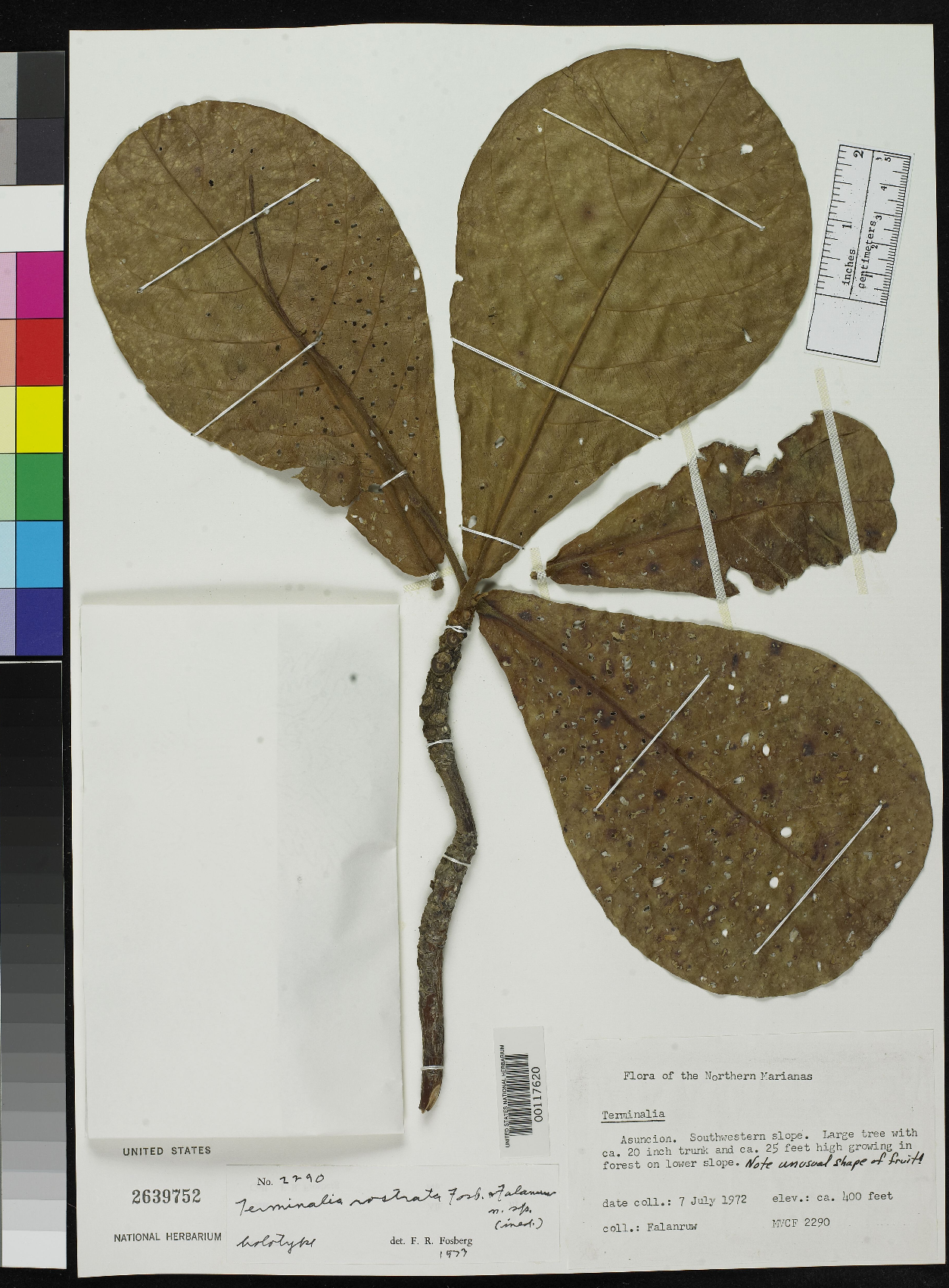
- Terminalia rostrata holotype specimen, Asuncion, 1972

Conservation status
- Vulnerable (IUCN 3.1)

Scientific classification
- Kingdom: Plantae
- Clade: Tracheophytes
- Clade: Angiosperms
- Clade: Eudicots
- Clade: Rosids
- Order: Myrtales
- Family: Combretaceae
- Genus: Terminalia
- Species: T. rostrata

Binomial name
- Terminalia rostrata Fosberg & Falanruw (1974)

= Terminalia rostrata =

Species of plant

Terminalia rostrata is a large tree found only on the Mariana Island of Asuncion. It is a part of the "Terminalia and ravine forest" on the western and southwestern slopes of the island, consisting of scattered Terminalia rostrata in association with Premna serratifolia, Morinda citrifolia, Hibiscus tiliaceus, and Pandanus tectorius. This forest type is described as the best-developed forest in the Mariana Islands north of Saipan, owing to its protection on the lee side of the mountain. The leaves of Terminalia rostrata are most similar to Terminalia catappa, but they have soft hairs similar to that of Terminalia samoensis. It is otherwise most similar to Terminalia foetidissima, although differing in various ways. The species name refers to the strongly beaked fruit. Fruit bats feed on the husks of the seeds. The species was first discovered by Marjorie V. C. Falanruw during an expedition to the far northern Mariana islands in 1972 and was first described by Francis Raymond Fosberg in the journal Phytologia in 1974.

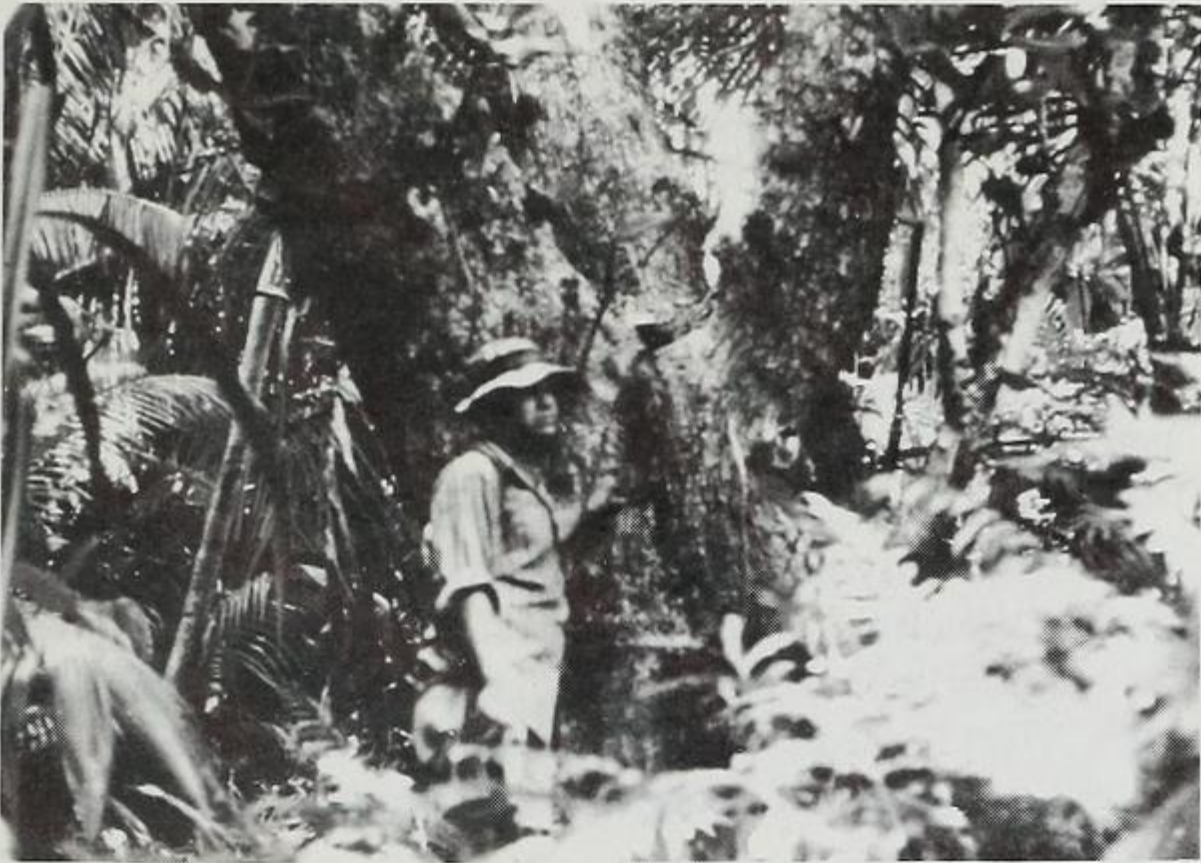
Trunk of Terminalia rostrata, Asuncion, 1972.

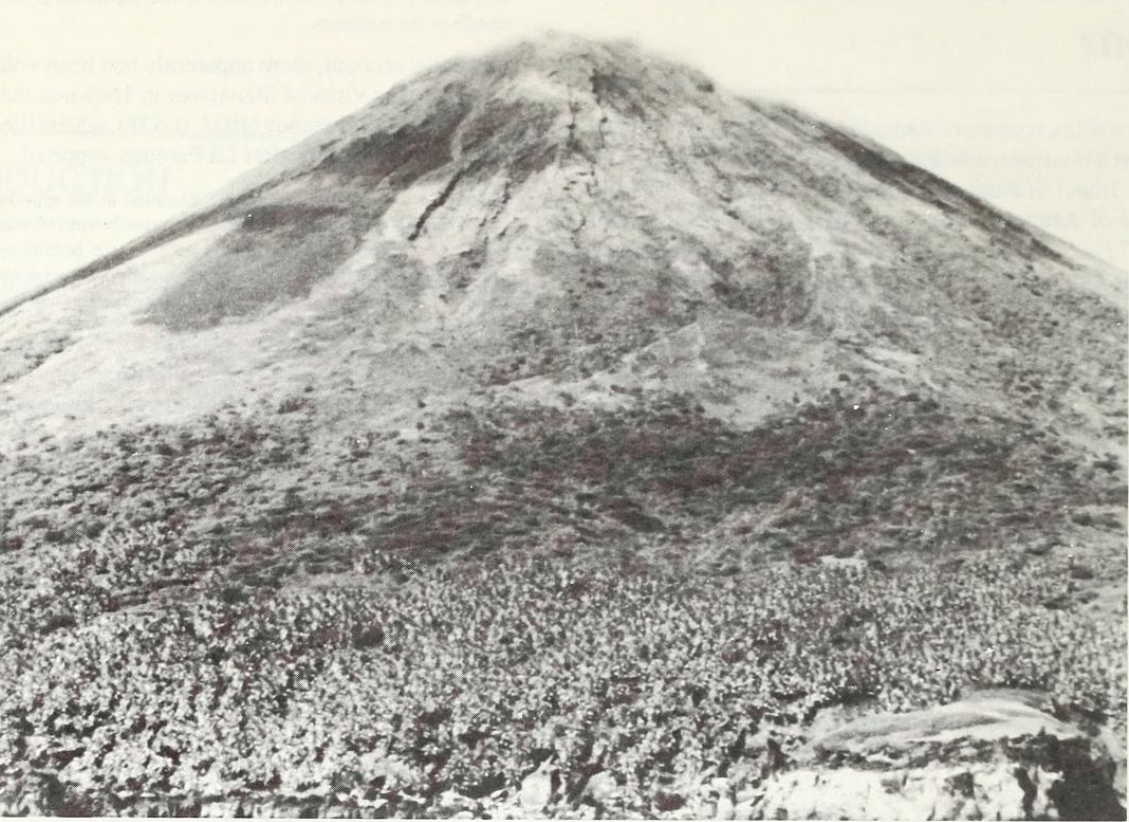
Terminalia rostrata forest is seen as a dark area mid-way up the slope. Asuncion, 1975.

== See also ==
- List of endemic plants in the Mariana Islands
