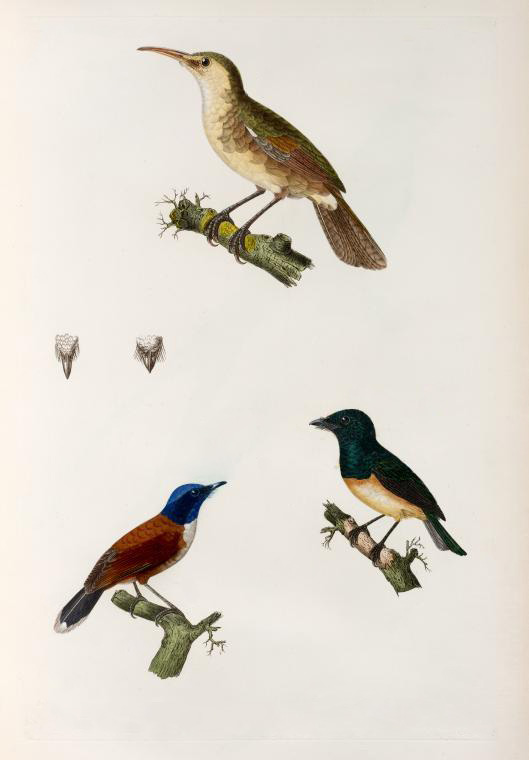
- Nightingale reed-warbler (top)

Conservation status
- Extinct (1969) (IUCN 3.1)

Scientific classification
- Kingdom: Animalia
- Phylum: Chordata
- Class: Aves
- Order: Passeriformes
- Family: Acrocephalidae
- Genus: Acrocephalus
- Species: †A. luscinius

Binomial name
- †Acrocephalus luscinius (Quoy & Gaimard, 1832)

Synonyms
- Thryothorus luscinius; Acrocephalus luscinia

= Nightingale reed warbler =

Species of bird

The nightingale reed warbler (Acrocephalus luscinius), or Guam reed-warbler, is an extinct songbird that was endemic to Guam.

== Taxonomy and systematics ==
The nightingale reed warbler was described by the French zoologists Jean Quoy and Joseph Gaimard in 1832 from a specimen collected on the island of Guam in the western Pacific Ocean. They coined the binomial name, Thryothorus luscinius. (Note: Although the ornithological part of the Voyage de la corvette l'Astrolabe has 1830 on the title page it was not published until 1832.) Until 2011, the Pagan reed warbler, Aguiguan reed warbler, and Saipan reed warbler were considered as subspecies of the nightingale reed warbler until split by the IOC.

== Extinction ==
The nightingale reed warbler was driven to extinction by several introduced species. These included the brown tree snake (Boiga irregularis) which has also decimated the populations or even caused the extinctions of several other bird species on Guam. Other introduced predators included rats (Rattus sp.), cats (Felis catus) and feral ungulates such as goats (Capra hircus) or sheep (Ovis aries). An introduced plant, ivy gourd (Coccinia grandis), destroyed the canopy of the trees that nightingale reed warblers built their nests in. Wetland destruction, fires and pesticides, as well as intensive land use for agriculture or building further reduced the available habitat. It has not been seen since 1969.

== Nesting ==
The nightingale reed warbler was nonmigratory and nested year round. The typical clutch had two eggs that were white with a green tint and were covered in lavender, chestnut, and black spots.

== See also ==
- List of birds of Guam
- List of birds of the Northern Mariana Islands
