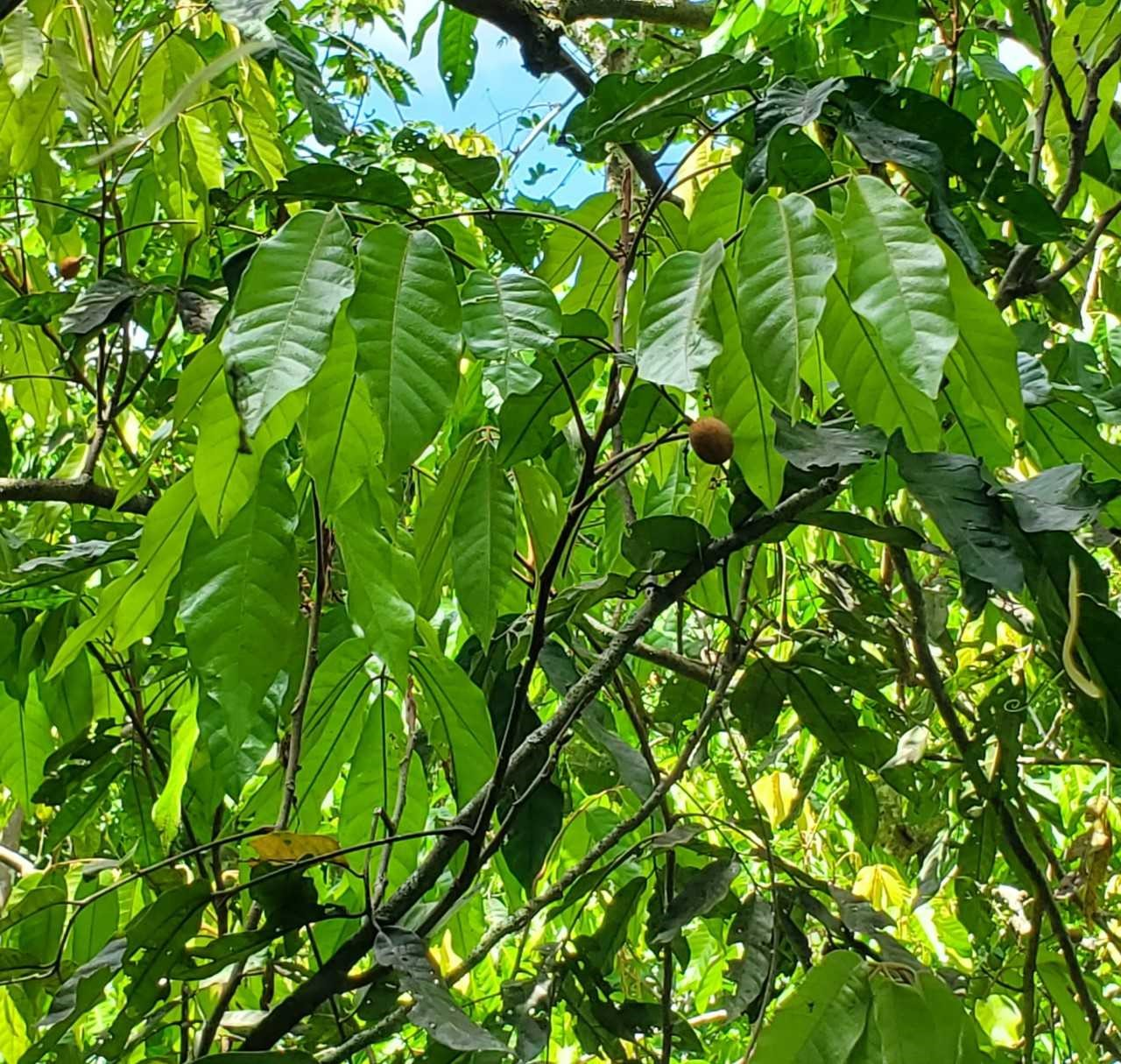
- Leaves and fruits, Saipan

Conservation status
- Vulnerable (IUCN 2.3)

Scientific classification
- Kingdom: Plantae
- Clade: Tracheophytes
- Clade: Angiosperms
- Clade: Eudicots
- Clade: Rosids
- Order: Sapindales
- Family: Meliaceae
- Genus: Aglaia
- Species: A. mariannensis

Binomial name
- Aglaia mariannensis Merr.

= Aglaia mariannensis =

Species of flowering plant

Aglaia mariannensis (Chamorro: mapunyao or mapuñao; Carolinian: fischil liyoos), is a tree endemic to the Mariana Islands, including Guam and the Northern Mariana Islands, with large (about 10–18 cm in length) dark green, glossy pinnately compound leaves, densely arranged on stems. Terminal leaf buds are often orange and fuzzy and look like praying hands.

Axillary or terminal flowers arranged in panicles are small, yellowish green and fragrant, smelling of citronella. The fruit is yellow or orange in color, ovoid, and contains one or two coffee-bean-sized seeds. The sparse flesh of the fruit is spongy and dry, but the fruits are dispersed by birds.

The name "aglaia" comes from the Greek language and it means "wisdom and glory".

== Gallery ==
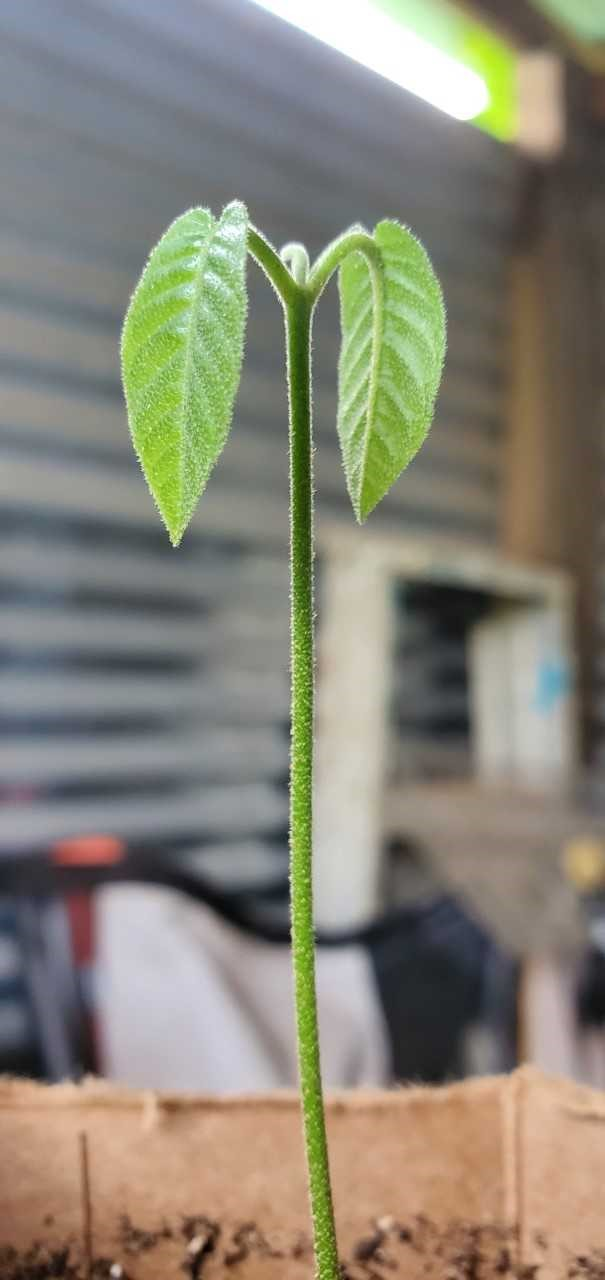
Seedling. Dededo, Guam

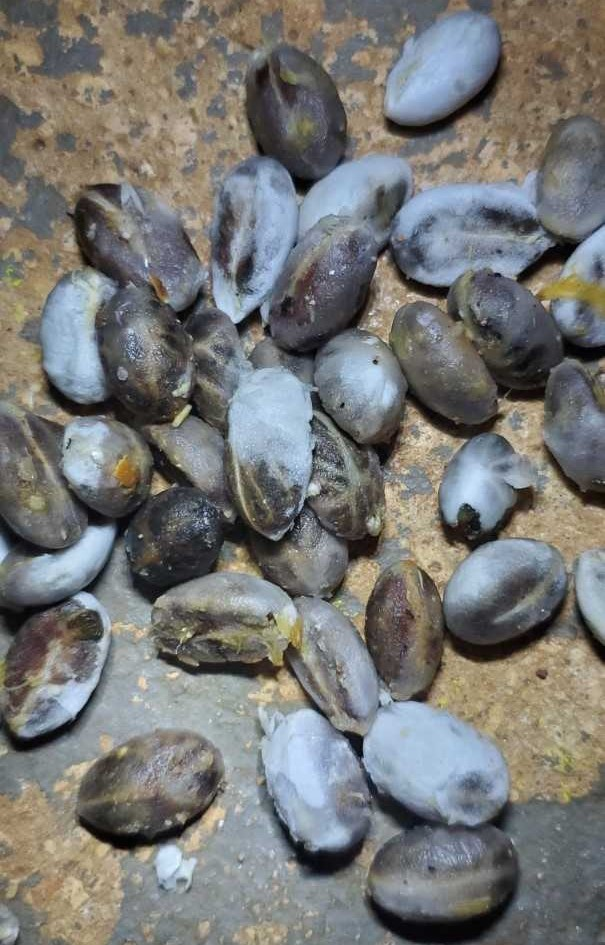
Seeds. Dededo, Guam

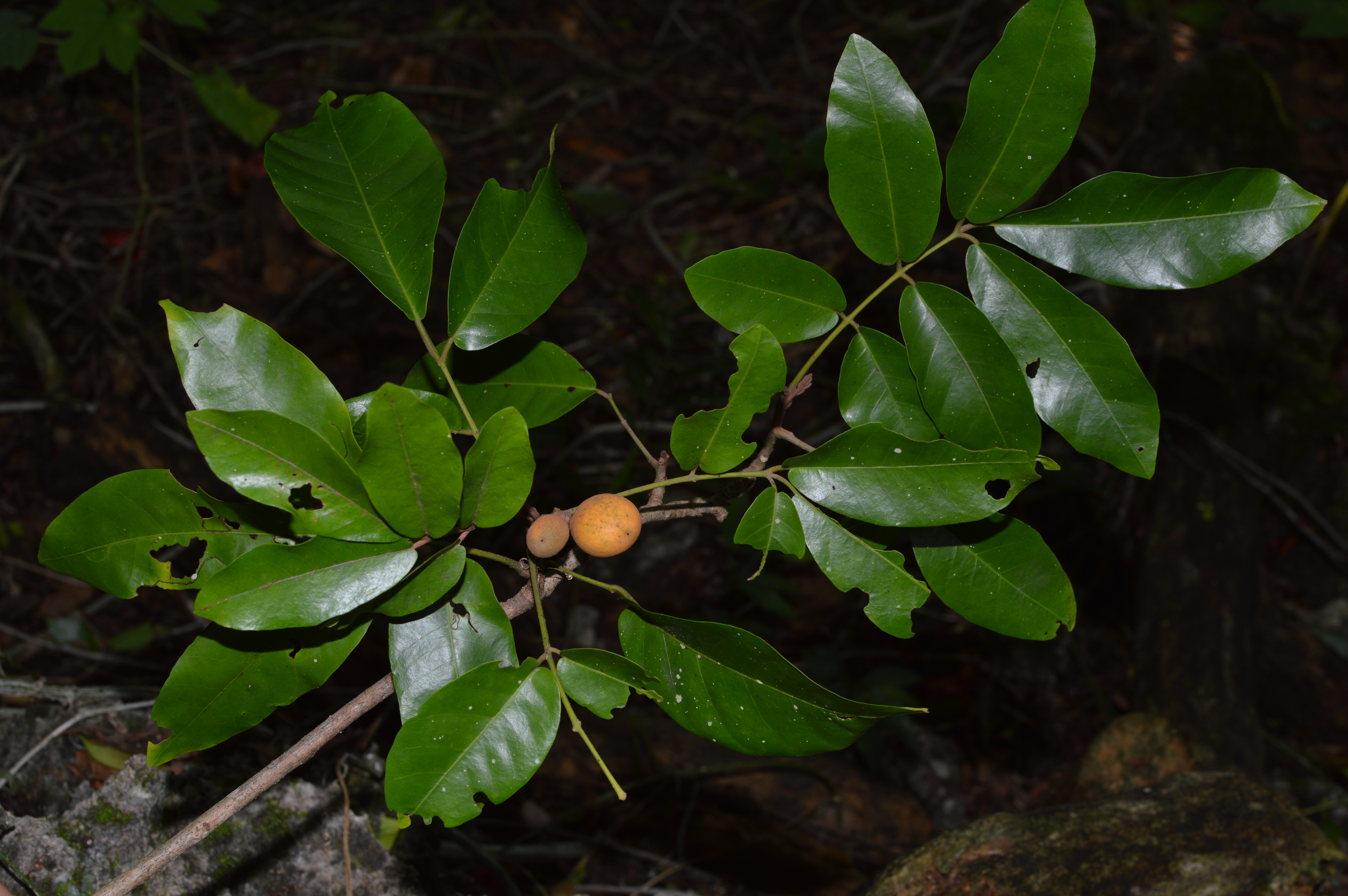
Aglaia mariannensis leaves and mature fruit. Saipan

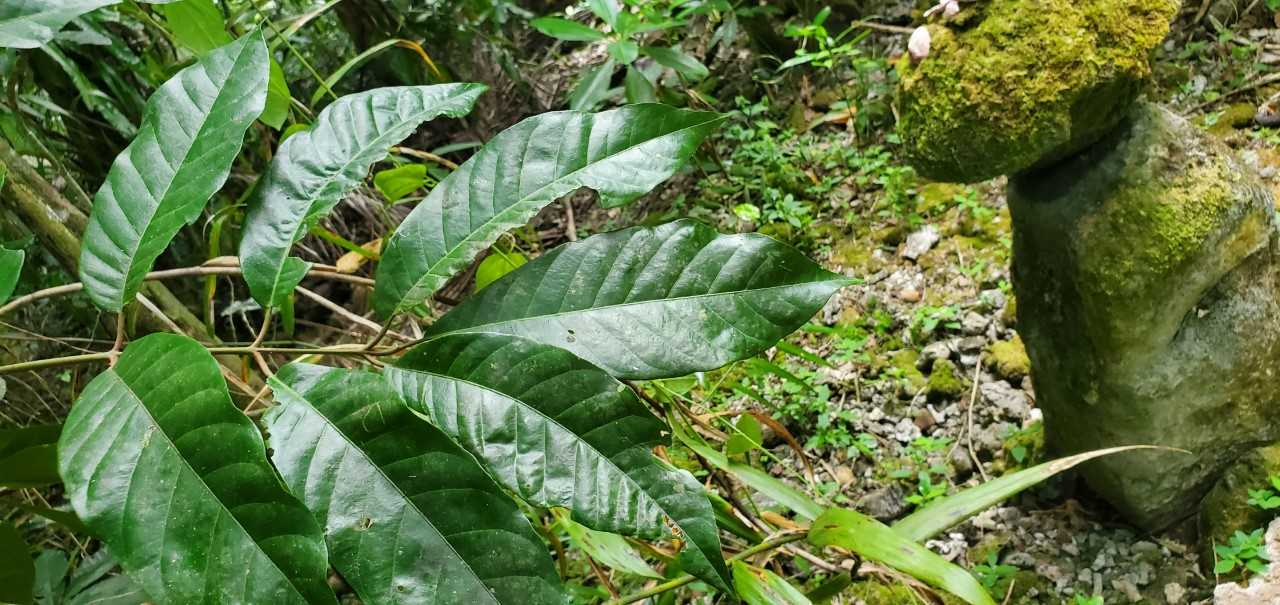
Stem with opposite leaves, next to ancient Chamorro latte stone. Hilaan, Dededo, Guam

== See also ==
- List of endemic plants in the Mariana Islands
