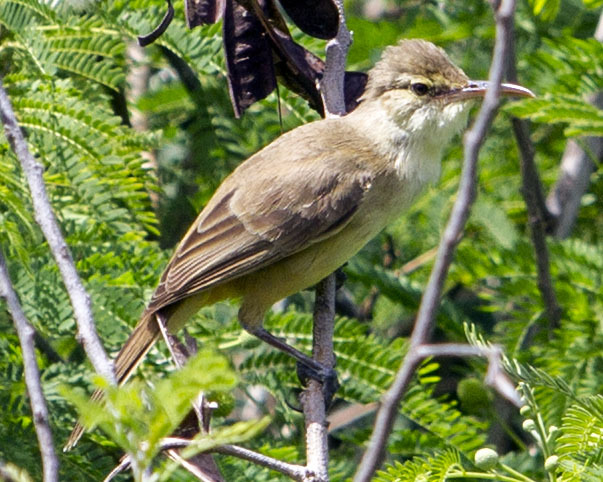
- Saipan reed warbler (Acrocephalus hiwae)

Conservation status
- Endangered (IUCN 3.1)

Scientific classification
- Kingdom: Animalia
- Phylum: Chordata
- Class: Aves
- Order: Passeriformes
- Family: Acrocephalidae
- Genus: Acrocephalus
- Species: A. hiwae

Binomial name
- Acrocephalus hiwae (Yamashina, 1942)
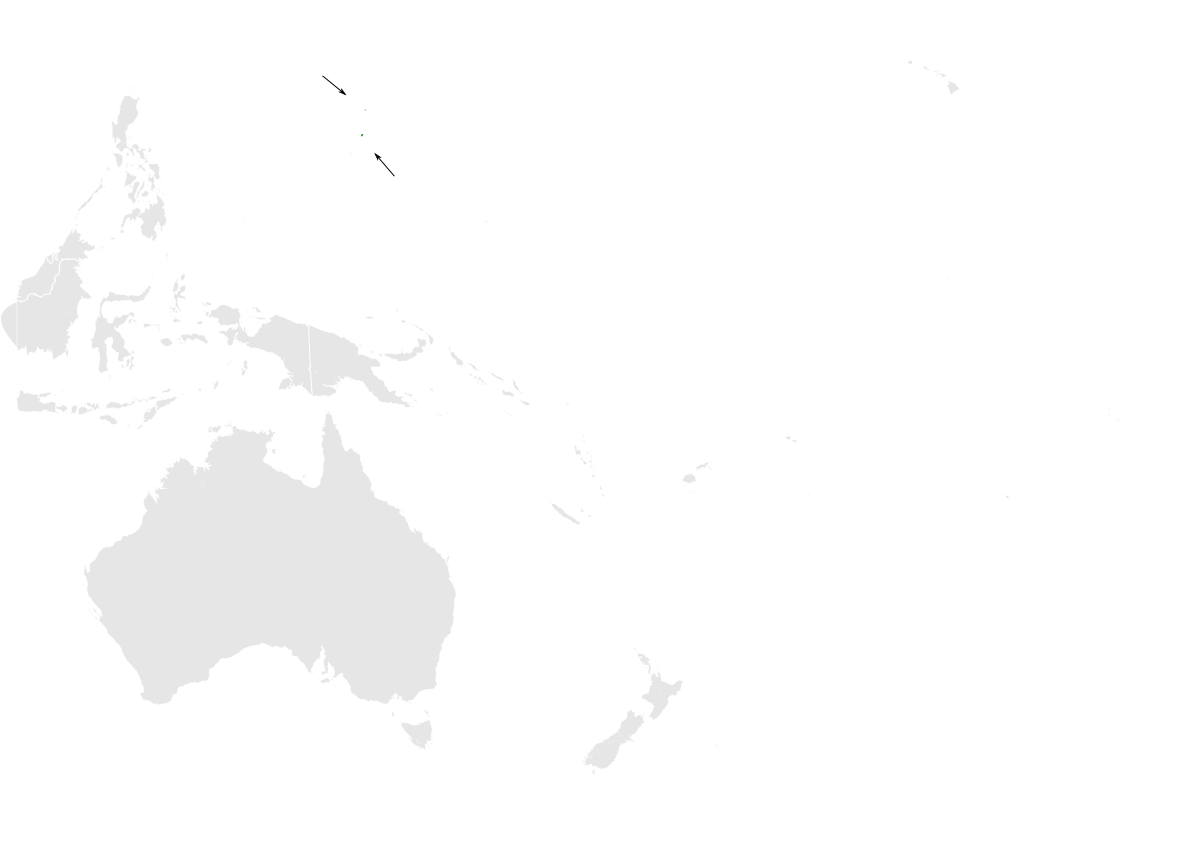

Synonyms
- Conopoderas luscinia hivae Yamashina, 1942; Acrocephalus luscinius hiwae (Yamashina, 1942)

= Saipan reed warbler =

Species of bird

The Saipan reed warbler (Acrocephalus hiwae) , known as gå'ga' karisu in Chamorro, is a species of oscine passerine bird belonging to the family Acrocephalidae, the reed and tree warblers. This endangered species is endemic to the U. S. territory of the Northern Mariana Islands.

== Taxonomy ==
The Saipan reed warbler was first formally described as Conopoderas luscinia hivae, a subspecies of the Nightingale reed warbler, in 1942 by the Japanese ornithologist Yoshimaro Yamashina with its type locality given as Saipan. This species is now recognised as valid and is placed in the genus Acrocephalus, the reed and marsh warblers, within the reed and tree warbler family Acrocephalidae.

== Description ==
The Saipan reed warbler is a large, mainly uniform brown reed warbler which has a pale throat, a yellowish face and a darker coloured cap and tail. It has a very long downward curved bill. The song is a slow, repetitive series of loud whistles, interspersed with warbles, trills and harsh chacking.

== Distribution and habitat ==
The Saipan reed warbler is endemic to two islands, Saipan and Alamagan in the Northern Marianas Islands, a U. S. Territory in the western Pacific Ocean. On Saipan this pscies is found in scrubby meadows, forest edge, forest clearings and reedswamp, while on Alamagan it occurs in open woodland and woodland on the edge of ravines.

== Conservation ==
The Saipan reed warbler has been assessed by the International Union for Conservation of Nature as Endangered, threats to this species include habitat destruction resulting from urban development and agriculture, the introduction of invasive species, and volcanic eruptions.

Saipan reed warbler song
Song of a male Saipan reed warbler on Saipan
