= Pagan reed warbler =

Pagan Reed Warbler

Conservation status
- Extinct (IUCN 3.1)

Scientific classification
- Kingdom: Animalia
- Phylum: Chordata
- Class: Aves
- Order: Passeriformes
- Family: Acrocephalidae
- Genus: Acrocephalus
- Species: †A. yamashinae

Binomial name
- †Acrocephalus yamashinae (Taka-Tsukasa, 1931)

Extinct species of bird

The Pagan reed warbler (Acrocephalus yamashinae) is an extinct species of passerine bird in the family Acrocephalidae, sometimes considered a subspecies of the nightingale reed warbler. It originally occurred on Pagan Island and "was extinct by the late 1970s". More precisely, in the 1970s, the 1980s, in 2000 and in 2010, the bird could not be found and is therefore presumed to be extinct.

== Taxonomy ==
The genus Acrocephalus was introduced in 1811 by the German naturalist Johann Andreas Naumann and his son Johann Friedrich Naumann. Many species have a flat head profile, which gives rise to the genus name, Acrocephalus from Ancient Greek akros, "highest", and kephale, "head". It is possible that the Naumanns thought akros meant "sharp-pointed". The specific epithet yamashinae commemorates the Japanese ornithologist Yoshimaro Yamashina, who founded the Yamashina Institute for Ornithology.
