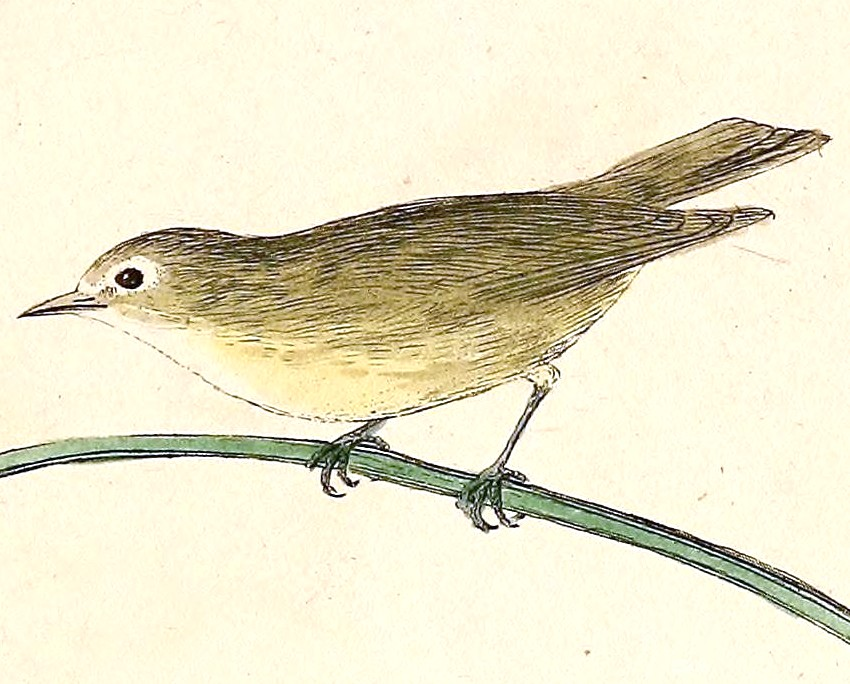

Conservation status
- Extinct (IUCN 3.1)

Scientific classification
- Kingdom: Animalia
- Phylum: Chordata
- Class: Aves
- Order: Passeriformes
- Family: Zosteropidae
- Genus: Zosterops
- Species: †Z. conspicillatus

Binomial name
- †Zosterops conspicillatus (Kittlitz, 1833)

Synonyms
- Dicaeum conspicillatum

= Bridled white-eye =

Species of bird

The bridled white-eye (Zosterops conspicillatus) (Chamorro name: nosa') is a species of white-eye native to the Mariana Islands and formerly Guam. The species' natural habitat is tropical forests, shrublands and urban areas.

== Taxonomy ==
Some sources, such as the IUCN, split the nominate subspecies and Z. c. saypani into separate species; in that case, the latter is known by the common name Saipan white-eye. Formerly, the Rota white-eye (Zosterops rotensis) was also considered as a subspecies of the bridled white-eye.

== Conservation ==
The nominate subspecies Zosterops conspicillatus conspicillatus, endemic to the island of Guam, became extinct due to the introduction of the brown tree snake. The last known sighting was in 1983. The US Fish and Wildlife Service delisted the species from the Endangered Species Act in October 2023 citing extinction.

The remaining subspecies, Z. conspicillatus saypani, endemic to the Northern Mariana Islands, on the islands of Tinian, Saipan and Aguijan, is separated as a full species by some authorities, in which case its common name is Saipan white-eye. This population is extremely abundant across its native range. 2007-2008 surveys estimated a population of 620,000-940,000, with approximately 534,000 birds on Saipan alone. In 2010, this species was the second most abundant breeding landbird encountered by surveyors on Saipan. As of 2022, the population was believed to not have changed significantly since earlier surveys and it was considered stable. In 2008, Z. c. saypani was also introduced to the uninhabited island of Sarigan as a precaution and by 2016 this new population had rapidly increased to more than 8,000 birds. The potential introduction of the brown tree snake on Saipan and U.S. military activity on Tinian could result in rapid population declines on these islands, but biosecurity measures to reduce this risk have so far been successful. If a brown treesnake still manages to enter the islands, a specially trained and equipped response team is deployed to eliminate it, reducing the risk of a new population becoming established. As a precautionary measure, the Saipan white-eye has been classified as near threatened. The Saipan white-eye has a captive breeding program based at several US zoos.

== See also ==
- List of birds of Guam
- List of birds of the Northern Mariana Islands
