= Aguiguan reed warbler =

Conservation status
- Extinct (IUCN 3.1)

Scientific classification
- Kingdom: Animalia
- Phylum: Chordata
- Class: Aves
- Order: Passeriformes
- Family: Acrocephalidae
- Genus: Acrocephalus
- Species: †A. nijoi

Binomial name
- †Acrocephalus nijoi (Yamashina, 1940)

Species of bird

The Aguiguan reed warbler or Aguijan reed warbler (Acrocephalus nijoi) is an extinct bird that originally occurred on the Northern Mariana Island Aguigan. It is considered a subspecies of the nightingale reed warbler by some taxonomists. Of this subspecies there never have been reports of a substantial population. In 1982 only four up to possibly 15 birds of the subspecies have been counted, and since 1995 none has been sighted, despite extended efforts to find specimens.
