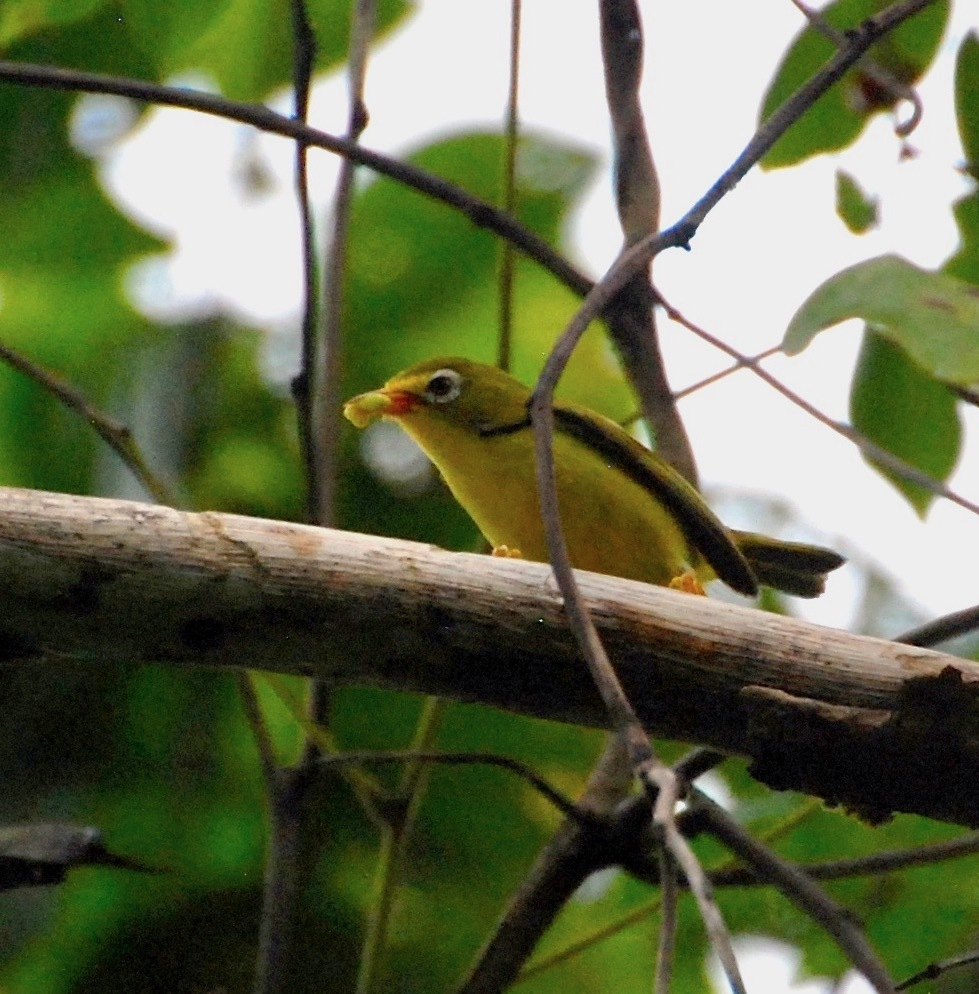

Conservation status
- Critically Endangered (IUCN 3.1)

Scientific classification
- Kingdom: Animalia
- Phylum: Chordata
- Class: Aves
- Order: Passeriformes
- Family: Zosteropidae
- Genus: Zosterops
- Species: Z. rotensis

Binomial name
- Zosterops rotensis Taka-Tsukasa & Yamashina, 1931
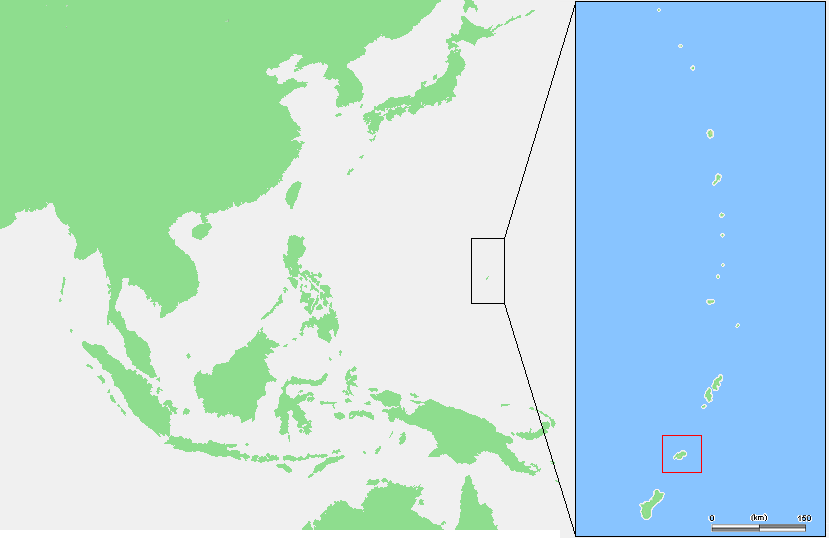

= Rota white-eye =

Species of bird

The Rota white-eye or Rota bridled white-eye (Zosterops rotensis) is a species of bird in the family Zosteropidae. It is critically endangered and endemic to Rota in the Northern Mariana Islands, where it mainly occurs in mature, wet limestone forests.

== Social Behavior ==
It forages and roosts in flocks.

== See also ==
- List of birds of the Northern Mariana Islands
