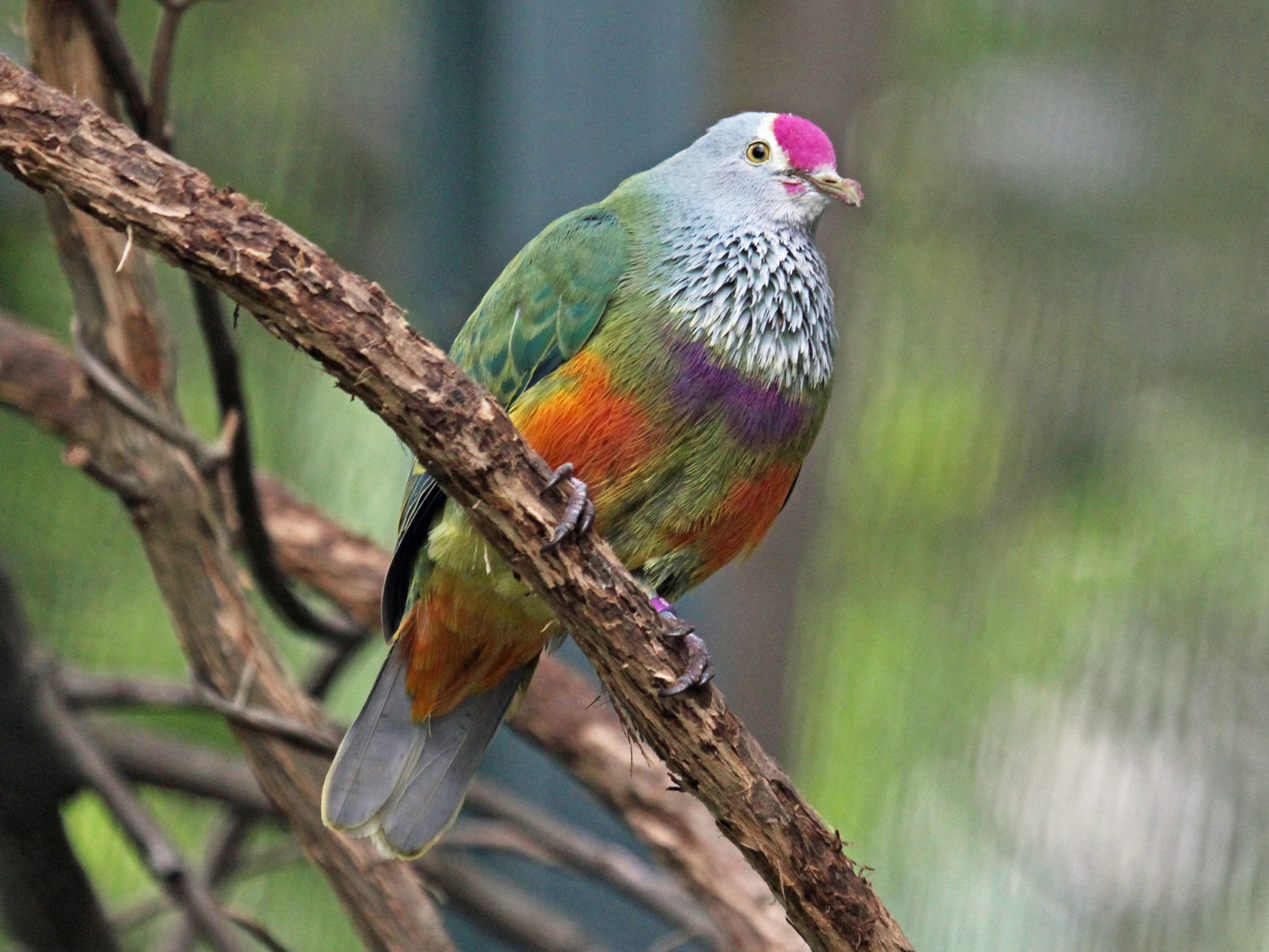
- At San Diego Zoo

Conservation status
- Near Threatened (IUCN 3.1)

Scientific classification
- Kingdom: Animalia
- Phylum: Chordata
- Class: Aves
- Order: Columbiformes
- Family: Columbidae
- Genus: Ptilinopus
- Species: P. roseicapilla

Binomial name
- Ptilinopus roseicapilla (Lesson, 1831)

= Mariana fruit dove =

Species of bird

The Mariana fruit dove (Ptilinopus roseicapilla), totot in the Northern Marianas Islands or Paluman totut on Guam, also known as mwee'mwe in the Carolinian language, is a small, up to 24 cm (9.4 in) long, green fruit dove native and endemic to the Northern Marianas Islands in the Pacific and Guam. It has a red forehead; greyish head, back and breast; and yellow belly patch and undertail coverts. Sightings of the Mariana Fruit Dove on Guam are rare with up to two sightings per year.

The female lays a single white egg. The chick and egg are tended to by both parents. Its diet consists mainly of fruits.

Culturally, the Mariana fruit dove is a very important symbol of the region. This species is the official bird of the Northern Marianas Islands.. In 2005, the Mariana fruit dove was originally chosen as the official mascot of the 2006 Micronesian Games in Saipan. However, the official website for the games shows a tropicbird as the official symbol instead of the Mariana fruit dove.

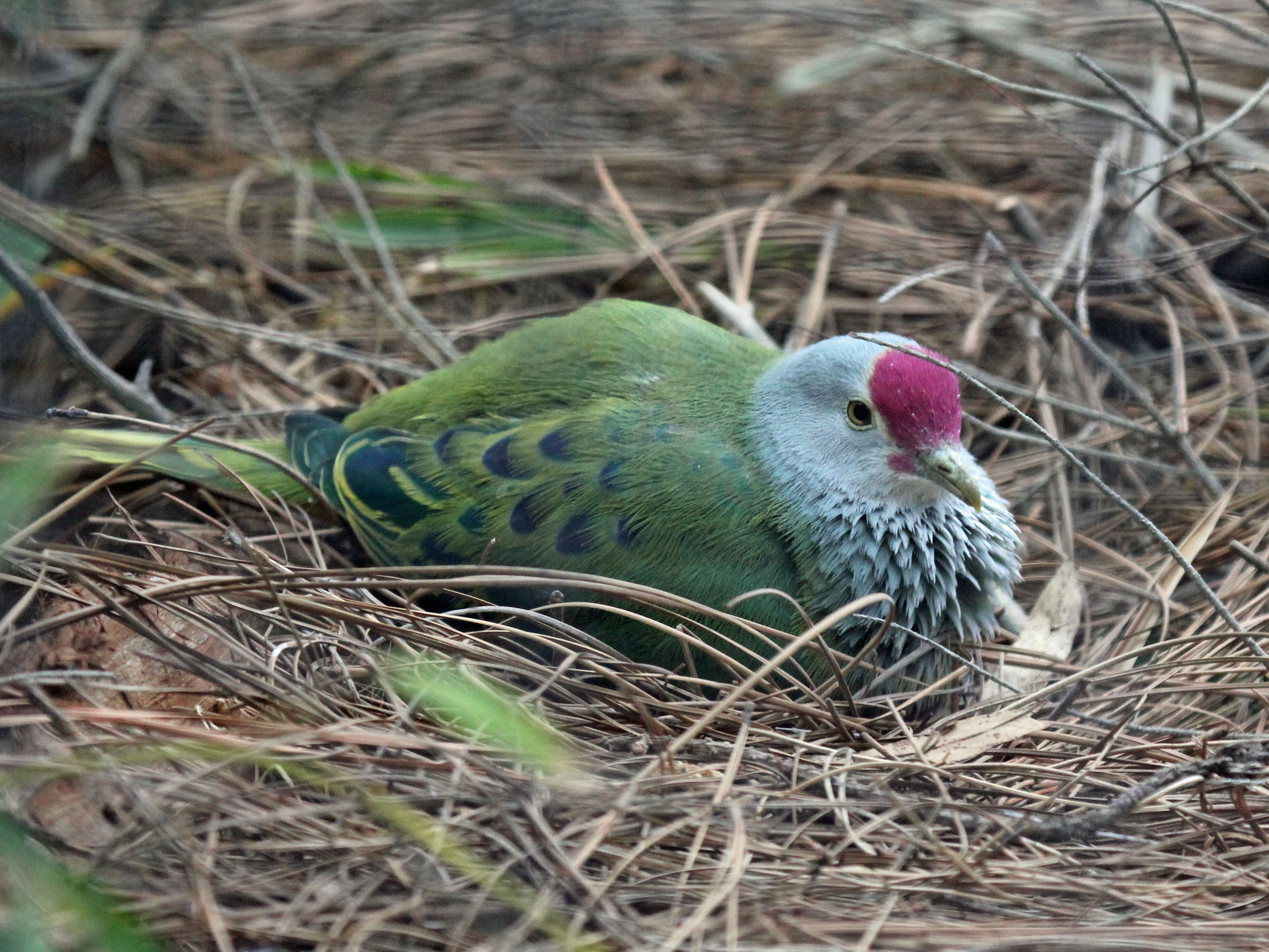

The species faces extinction due to habitat loss throughout its range. A larger threat to the Mariana fruit dove has been the accidental introduction of the brown tree snake to Guam during World War II. The snakes decimated the native bird populations of the island, which were unaccustomed to predators. They are extinct on Guam since 1984 and the Mariana fruit dove is highly endangered on other islands in its range. The spread of the snakes to the Northern Marianas Islands could be devastating. Several zoos have started captive breeding programs. The St. Louis Zoo, in St. Louis, Missouri, has one of the most successful captive breeding programs. The program began in 1993.

Due to ongoing habitat loss, limited range, small population size and invasive alien species, the Mariana fruit dove is evaluated as near threatened on the IUCN Red List of Threatened Species.

== Gallery ==
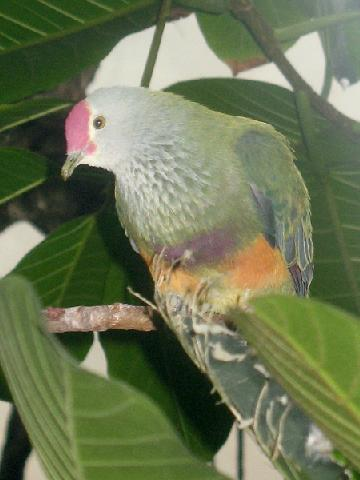
At Bronx Zoo

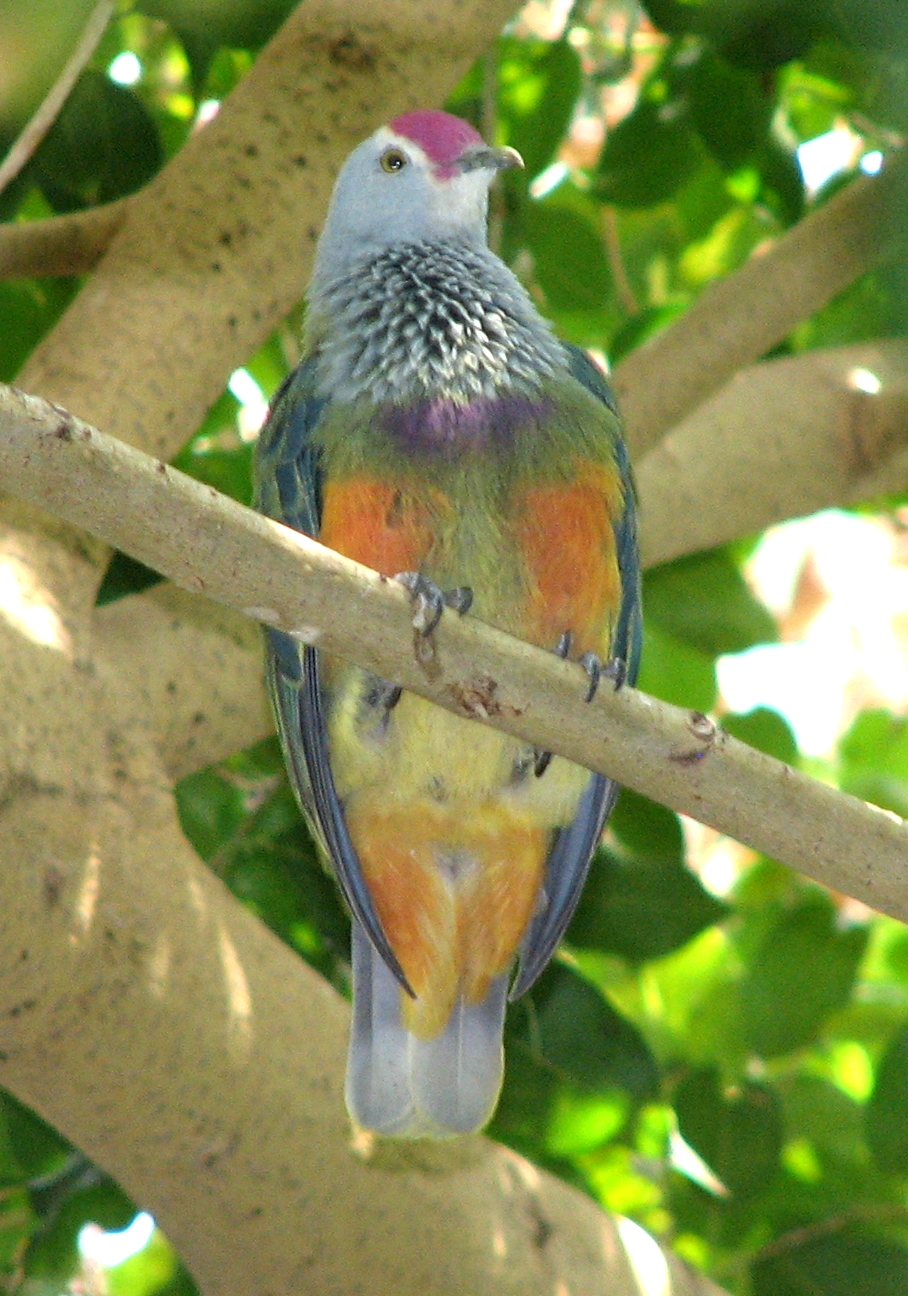
At Louisville Zoo

== See also ==
- List of birds of Guam
- List of birds of the Northern Mariana Islands
