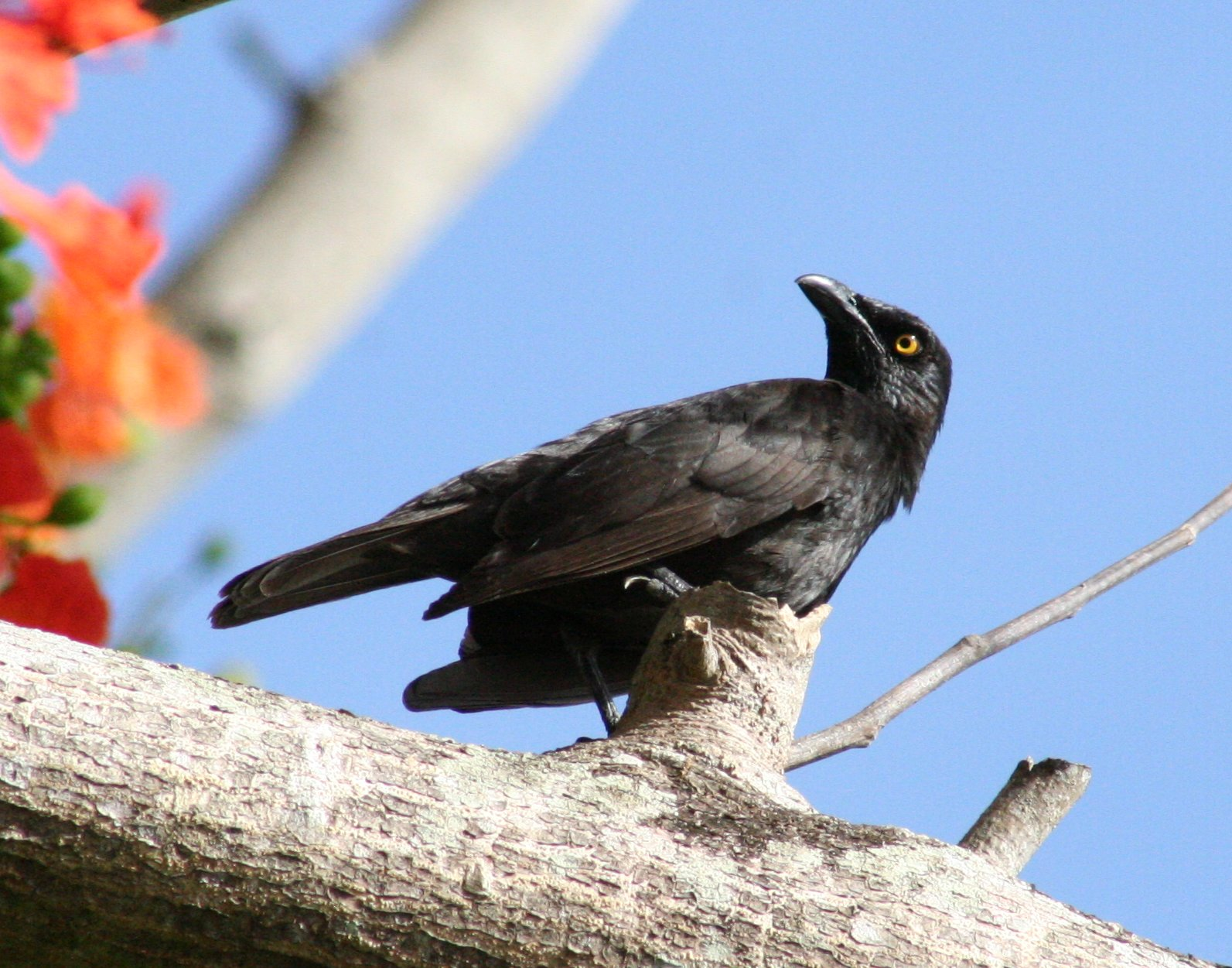

Conservation status
- Least Concern (IUCN 3.1)

Scientific classification
- Kingdom: Animalia
- Phylum: Chordata
- Class: Aves
- Order: Passeriformes
- Family: Sturnidae
- Genus: Aplonis
- Species: A. opaca

Binomial name
- Aplonis opaca (Kittlitz, 1833)

= Micronesian starling =

Species of bird

The Micronesian starling (Aplonis opaca) is a species of starling in the family Sturnidae. It is found in Micronesia, from the Northern Mariana Islands to Palau and all the way into eastern Micronesia. Its natural habitats are subtropical or tropical dry forest and subtropical or tropical moist lowland forest. It is the only native frugivore existing on Guam.

Micronesian starlings are bold around humans and will follow humans as they approach seabird colonies to take the eggs as the seabirds are scared away. They are known as såli in Chamorro and gapl'uw in Yapese; other indigenous names may also exist across Micronesia.

Micronesian starlings breed year-round. Both parents care for their young, nesting in cavities. They demonstrate significant aggression when defending nests, especially for older nestlings.

== Diet ==
Micronesian starlings consume fruit, seeds, the occasional insect and the eggs of seabirds. The majority of plants they eat fruit from are native to the islands they inhabit. They are a key seed disperser in Mariana Islands forests.

Their diet seems to be consistent year-round. Nestlings, juveniles, and adults have similar diets, with the exception of papayas, which are eaten by adults and juveniles but rarely by nestlings.

== See also ==
- List of birds of Guam
- List of birds of the Northern Mariana Islands
