= 1975 Northern Mariana Islands status referendum =

Ballot measure in the Northern Mariana Islands

A referendum on becoming a US commonwealth was held in the Northern Mariana Islands on 17 June 1975. The proposal was approved by 79% of voters. As a result, the United States Congress approved the change of status on 24 March 1976.

== Background ==
Four previous referendums on either integration with Guam or the islands' status had been held in 1958, 1961, 1963 and 1969. On each occasion a majority of Northern Mariana Islands voters had been in favor of integration with Guam, but Guamanian voters rejected integration in a 1969 referendum.

On 20 February 1975 the Northern Marianas' District Legislature put forward proposals to become a US commonwealth. A threshold of 55% in favor was set in order for the referendum to pass.

== Results ==
Choice	Votes	%
For	3,945	78.82
Against	1,060	21.18
Invalid/blank votes	4	–
Total	5,009	100
Registered voters/turnout	5,379	93.12
Source: Direct Democracy

== See also ==
- Marianas Political Status Commission
