= 1969 Northern Mariana Islands status referendum =

Ballot measure in the Northern Mariana Islands

A referendum on the status of the Northern Mariana Islands was held on 9 November 1969. For the fourth time since 1958 a majority of voters supported integration with Guam. However, a referendum held in Guam on 4 November on integration with the Northern Mariana Islands had been rejected by 58% of Guamanian voters.

== Background ==
Previous referendums on either integration with Guam or the islands' status had been held in 1958, 1961 and 1963. On each occasion a majority had been in favor of integration. However, the proposal remained unfulfilled.

The 1969 referendum was organized by the local Parliament, and was held prior to a visit by a United Nations commission in early 1970.

== Results ==
Voters were given five options:

1. Do you want to become U.S. Citizen within the political framework of the Territory of Guam?
2. Do you want independence?
3. Do you want to become an unincorporated Territory of the United States?
4. Do want to free associate with the United States?
5. What other form of government do you want?

Choice	Votes	%
Integration with Guam	1,942	60.82
Free association with the USA	1,116	34.95
Unincorporated territory of the USA	107	3.35
Independence	19	0.59
Other status	9	0.28
Invalid/blank votes	40	–
Total	3,233	100
Registered voters/turnout	4,954	65.26
Source: Direct Democracy
