= Agrihan =

Island of the Northern Mariana Islands

Agrigan
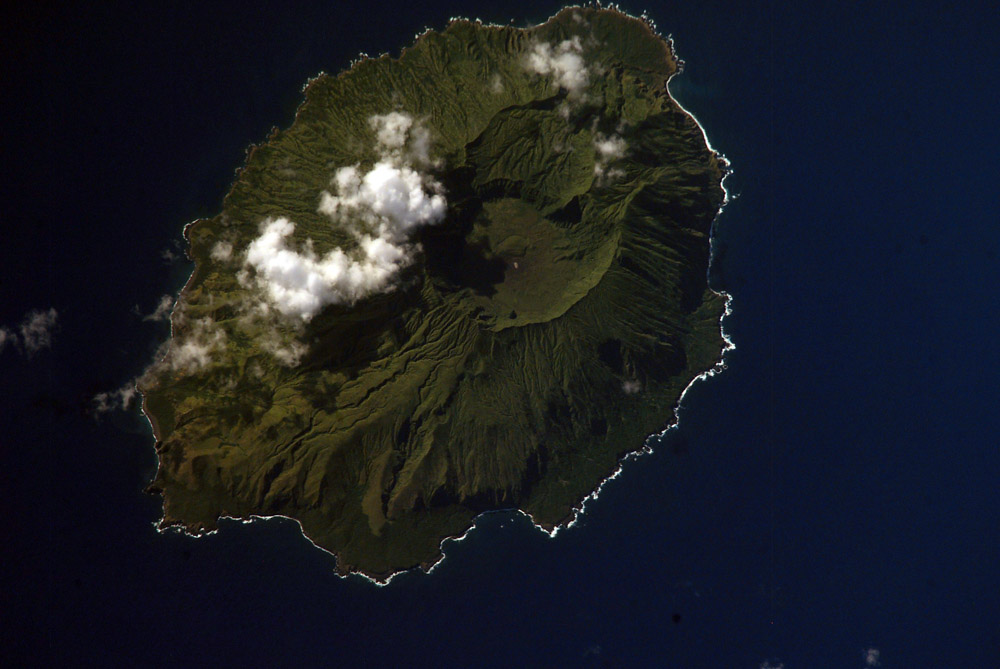
- NASA Space Shuttle image of Agrihan

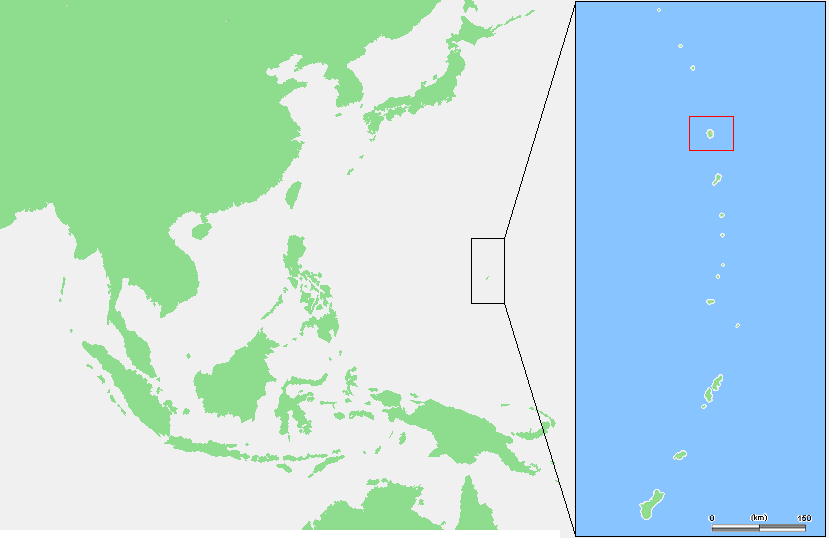

Geography
- Location: Pacific Ocean
- Coordinates: 18°46′42″N 145°40′17″E
- Archipelago: Northern Mariana Islands
- Area: 44.05 km^{2} (17.01 sq mi)
- Length: 9 km (5.6 mi)
- Width: 6 km (3.7 mi)
- Highest elevation: 965 m (3166 ft)
- Highest point: Mount Agrihan

Administration
- United States
- Commonwealth: Northern Mariana Islands

Demographics
- Population: 4 (2020)

Agrihan (also spelled Agrigan) is an island in the Northern Mariana Islands in the Pacific Ocean. The island has mostly been uninhabited, but had 4 permanent residents in the 2020 U.S. census. Agrihan is located 62 kilometers (39 mi) to the north of Pagan.

== History ==
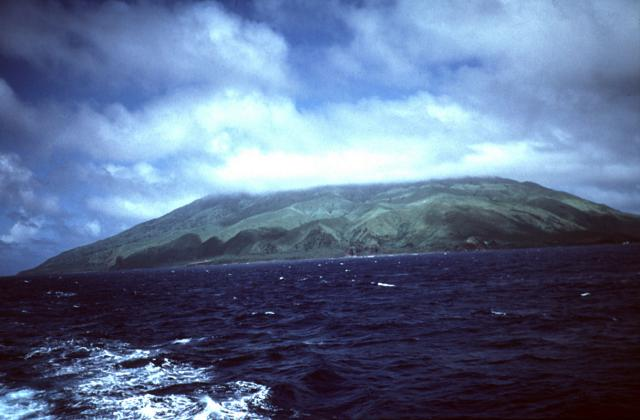
Clouds drape the flat-topped summit of Agrihan, the highest of the Marianas arc volcanoes, in this view from the south.

The first European to discover the island was Gonzalo Gómez de Espinosa on June 11, 1522. He named it "Cyco" or "La Griega" (The Greek in Spanish). Espinosa was on the Trinidad as part of Ferdinand Magellan's expedition, and called on the island while attempting to cross the Pacific Ocean to Mexico. The resident Chamorros were hostile and he could not anchor, but kidnapped an islander for information. The Spanish missionary Diego Luis de San Vitores visited Agrihan in 1669 calling it "San Francisco Javier". In 1695, the natives were forcibly removed to Saipan, and three years later to Guam.

In 1810, settlers from the Kingdom of Hawaii attempted to establish a settlement on Agrihan. A party of shipwrecked sailors from the sealing vessel Resource lived here for part of 1819. In the 1870s, the first coconut plantations were established. Adolph Capelle, a merchant from Brunswick in Germany, leased the island and exported copra, using around 20 seasonal workers from the Caroline Islands. Following the sale of the Northern Marianas by Spain to the German Empire in 1899, Agrihan was administered as part of German New Guinea. During this time, a private firm, the Pagan Society, owned by a German and a Japanese partner, developed more coconut plantations. However, severe typhoons in September 1905 and September 1907 destroyed the plantations and bankrupted the company.

During World War I, Agrihan came under the control of the Empire of Japan and was subsequently administered as the South Seas Mandate. Following World War II, the island came under the control of the United States and was administered as part of the Trust Territory of the Pacific Islands. In 1967, the population was 94 people. Since 1978, the island has been part of the Northern Islands Municipality of the Commonwealth of the Northern Mariana Islands. In 1990, the population was just 25 people.

Due to increased volcanic activity, the islanders were evacuated in August 1990 when an eruption was feared. However, by 1992, although there were 25 solfataras, a boiling hot spring and several steam vents, no eruption had taken place. In 2000, six people returned to live in one of the original four settlements on the island. However, per the 2010 census, Agrihan was uninhabited. Despite the data from the 2010 census, according to the Commonwealth of the Northern Mariana Islands Department of Lands, settlement has since been reestablished in one of the four original villages, and as of September 2005 there remain nine inhabitants on the island. The 2020 US census listed a population of 4.

An expedition organized by John D. Mitchler and Reid Larson made the first known complete ascent to the summit of this peak on June 1, 2018.

== Geography ==
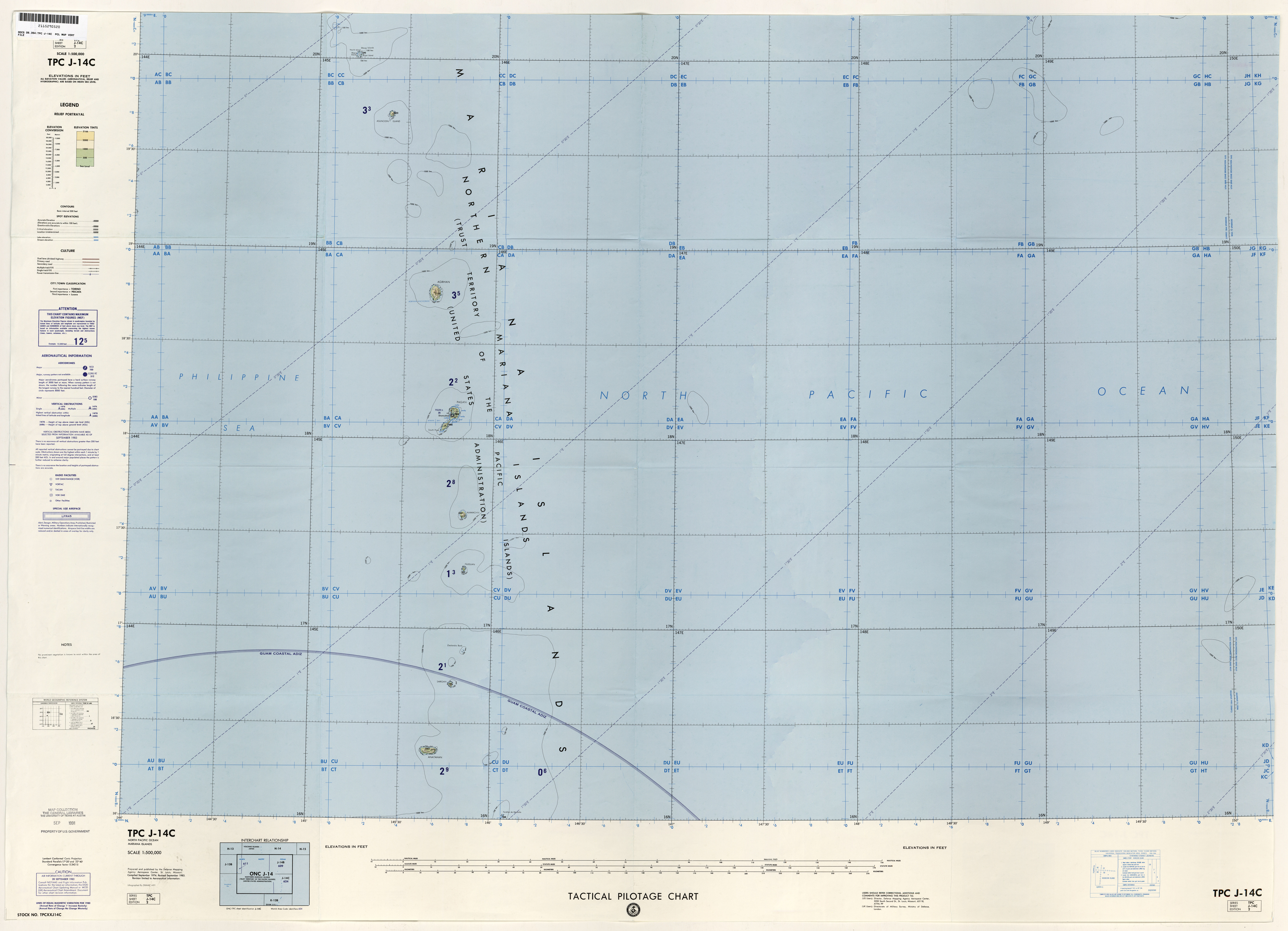
Map including Agrihan (DMA, 1983)

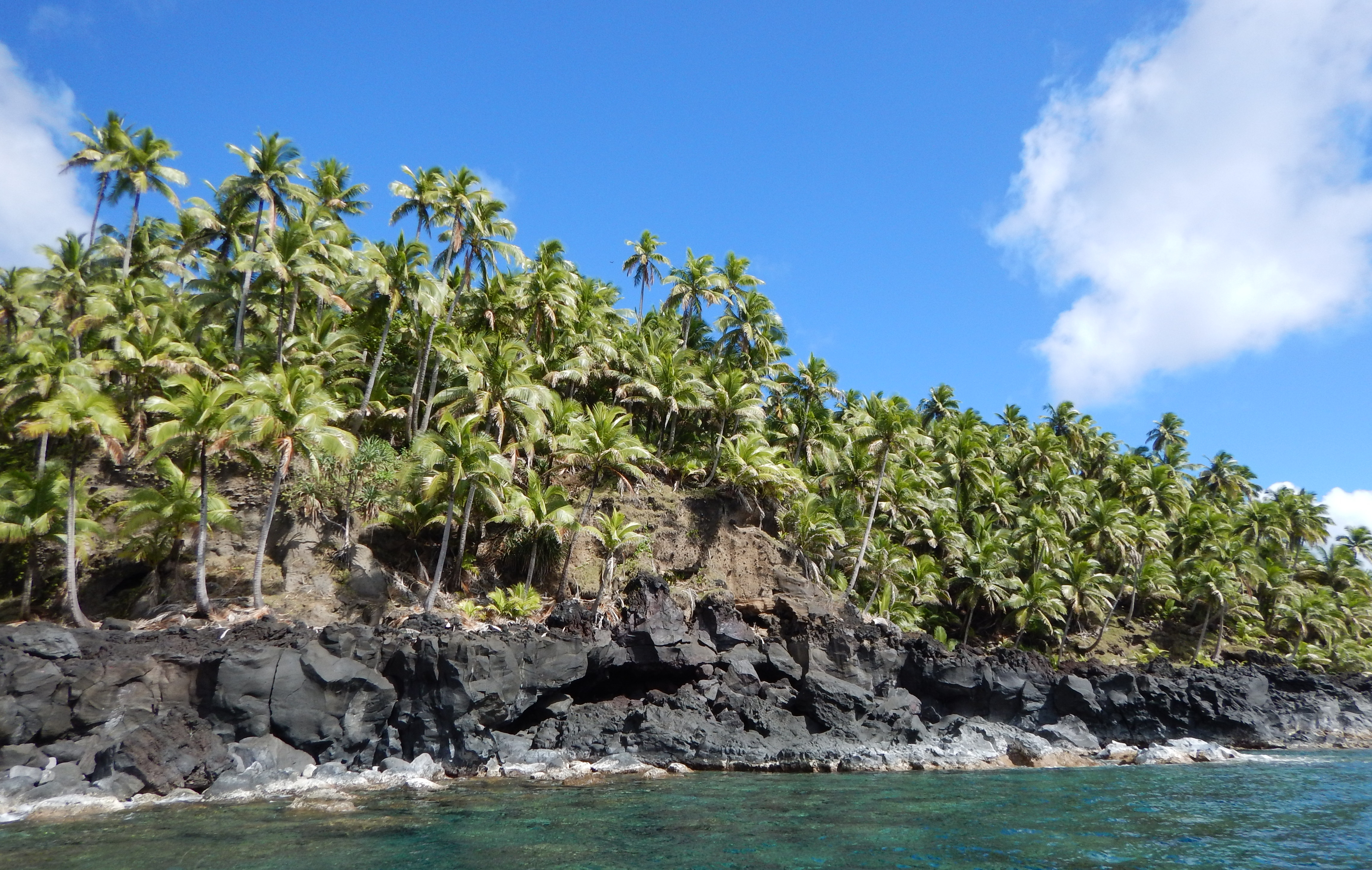
Agrihan is heavily forested

Agrihan is a densely forested island, roughly elliptical in shape, with a length of 9 kilometers (5.6 mi) and a width of 6 km (3.7 mi) and an area of 44 km^{2} (17 sq mi). The entire island is a massive stratovolcano, called Mount Agrihan, which rises over 4,000 meters (13,120 ft) from the ocean floor, and is the fifth largest in the Marianas volcanic arc. At 976.5792 m (3,204 ft), its summit is the highest point in Micronesia.

The volcano is topped by a large caldera, 1 km × 2 km (0.62 mi × 1.24 mi) in size and about 500 m (1,640 ft) deep. The caldera floor has several lava flows and two volcanic cones, which were probably created during the April 1917 eruption. The only relatively flat land on the island is along the southeast shoreline and on the north side of the central caldera.

Vegetation includes swordgrass (Miscanthus floridulus) grasslands on the upper slopes, forests of coconut palm (Cocos nucifera), with some breadfruit (Artocarpus altilis) and papaya (Carica papaya) on the lower slopes and within the deep ravines that descend radially from the summit.

== Climate ==
Climate data for Agrihan, Northern Mariana Islands
Month	Jan	Feb	Mar	Apr	May	Jun	Jul	Aug	Sep	Oct	Nov	Dec	Year
Mean daily maximum °F (°C)	67 (19)	66 (19)	66 (19)	68 (20)	70 (21)	72 (22)	72 (22)	72 (22)	72 (22)	71 (22)	70 (21)	69 (21)	70 (21)
Mean daily minimum °F (°C)	65 (18)	64 (18)	65 (18)	67 (19)	69 (21)	70 (21)	71 (22)	71 (22)	71 (22)	70 (21)	69 (21)	67 (19)	68 (20)
Average rainfall inches (mm)	1.3 (33)	0.9 (23)	1.0 (25)	1.9 (48)	3.0 (76)	3.8 (97)	7.6 (190)	12.1 (310)	10.8 (270)	7.8 (200)	3.8 (97)	2.9 (74)	56.9 (1,443)
Source: Meteoblue.com

== Population ==
As of 1980, the population of Agrihan was 54.

Formerly a coconut plantation, the island had a population of 0 from 2010 to 2018. In 2018 the island was re-inhabited by 2 former residents of Saipan.

== See also ==
- List of stratovolcanoes
