= Northern Mariana Islands =

U.S. territory in the Pacific Ocean

- Commonwealth of the Northern Mariana Islands; Sankattan Siha Na Islas Mariånas (Chamorro); Commonwealth Téél Falúw kka Efáng llól Marianas (Carolinian)
- Flag Seal
- Anthem: "Gi Talo Gi Halom Tasi" (Chamorro) "Satil Matawal Pacifiko" (Carolinian) ("In the Middle of the Sea") (regional) "The Star-Spangled Banner" (official)
- Location of the Northern Mariana Islands (circled in red)
- Sovereign state: United States (Note: Despite being under the sovereignty of the United States since 1978, the CNMI has not been fully incorporated into the country for constitutional purposes. See the page for the Insular Cases for more information.)
- Before association with the United States: Trust Territory of the Pacific Islands
- Commonwealth status: January 9, 1978
- End of U.N. Trusteeship: November 4, 1986
- Capital and largest city: Saipan; 15.19°N 145.74°E
- Official languages: English; Chamorro; Carolinian
- Other languages: Tagalog
- Ethnic groups (2023): 35.3% Filipino; 23.9% Chamorro; 6.8% Chinese; 4.6% Refaluwasch; 4.2% Korean; 6.4% other Pacific Islander; 3.78% other Asian; 15.1% other
- Religion (2010): 81.3% Christianity; 10.6% Buddhism; 5.3% folk religions; 1.0% no religion; 0.7% Islam; 1.1% other
- Demonym(s): Northern Mariana Islander (formal); Northern Marianan (other); Marianan (diminutive form); Chamorro (colloquial)
- Government: Devolved presidential constitutional dependency
  - President: Donald Trump (R)
  - Governor: David M. Apatang (I)
  - Lieutenant Governor: Dennis C. Mendiola (R)
- Legislature: Commonwealth Legislature
  - Upper house: Senate
  - Lower house: House of Representatives

United States Congress
  - House delegate: Kimberlyn King-Hinds (R)

Area
  - Total: 464 km^{2} (179 sq mi)
  - Water (%): negligible
- Highest elevation (Mount Agrihan): 965 m (3,166 ft)

Population
  - 2022 estimate: 46,078
  - 2020 census: 47,329
  - Density: 113/km^{2} (292.7/sq mi) (97th)
- GDP (PPP): 2016 estimate
  - Total: $1.24 billion
  - Per capita: $25,516
- GDP (nominal): 2022 estimate
  - Total: $1.096 billion
  - Per capita: $23,785
- HDI (2017): 0.875 very high
- Currency: United States dollar (US$) (USD)
- Time zone: UTC+10:00 (ChST)
- Date format: mm/dd/yyyy
- Driving side: Right
- Calling code: +1
- USPS abbreviation: MP
- Trad. abbreviation: CNMI
- ISO 3166 code: MP; US-MP
- Internet TLD: .mp

The Northern Mariana Islands, officially the Commonwealth of the Northern Mariana Islands (CNMI), (Note: The definition of Commonwealth according to U.S. State Department policy (as codified in the department's Foreign Affairs Manual) reads: "The term 'Commonwealth' does not describe or provide for any specific political status or relationship.") is an unincorporated territory and commonwealth of the United States consisting of the 14 northern islands of the Mariana Archipelago in the northwestern Pacific Ocean. The southernmost, Guam, is a separate U.S. territory. The Northern Mariana Islands were listed by the United Nations as a non-self-governing territory until 1990.

During the colonial period, the Northern Marianas were variously under the control of the Spanish, German, and Japanese empires. After World War II, the islands were part of the United Nations trust territories under American administration before formally joining the United States as a territory in 1986, with their population gaining United States citizenship.

Their area is 183.5 square miles (475.26 km^{2}). In 2020, 47,329 people lived in the CNMI. The vast majority of the population resides on Saipan, Tinian, and Rota. The other Northern Mariana islands are sparsely inhabited; the most notable among these is Pagan, which has been largely uninhabited since a 1981 volcanic eruption.

The administrative center is Capitol Hill, a village in northwestern Saipan. The current governor of the CNMI is David M. Apatang, who was elevated from lieutenant governor on July 23, 2025, following the death in office of Arnold Palacios who had served as governor since January 2023. The legislative branch has a nine-member Senate and a 20-member House of Representatives.

== History ==
The islands were settled around 1500 BC when various peoples migrated there. Eventually, the islands were claimed by Spain in 1521. In the 18th century, the people of the northern Marianas were forced by Spain to relocate, and when they returned, new peoples migrated there. In 1899 Spain sold the Northern Marianas to Germany in the Spanish-German Treaty of 1899, while Guam went to the United States. At the end of World War I, with the defeat of Germany, the islands became a part of the Japanese Mandate under the League of Nations, starting in 1918. The islands were liberated from the Japanese in the Battle of Saipan in 1944, and after the war, became part of the UN Trust Territory called the Trust Territory of the Pacific Islands (TTPI). Over the decades, integration with Guam was rejected, and eventually, the islands left the TTPI and became a part of the US in 1986. The Northern Marianas then became the Commonwealth of the Northern Mariana Islands (CNMI) and its residents are US citizens. In 2009, they elected a non-voting delegate to the US Congress.

=== Arrival of humans ===
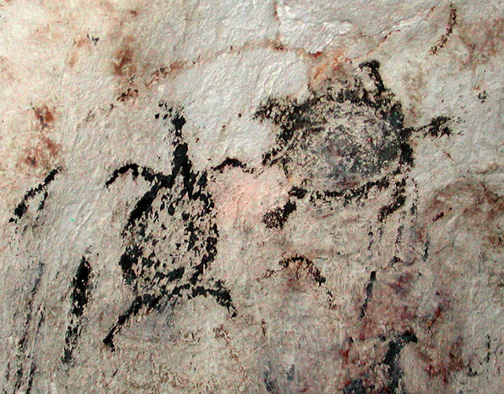
Pictograms of sea turtles in Chugai' cave on Rota

The Mariana Islands were the first islands settled by humans in Remote Oceania. Incidentally, their settlement was the first and longest of the ocean-crossing voyages of the Austronesian peoples, separate from the later Polynesian settlement of the rest of Remote Oceania. The islands were first settled around 1500 to 1400 BC by people from the Philippines. This was followed by a second migration from the Caroline Islands by the first millennium AD, and a third migration from Maritime Southeast Asia (likely the Philippines or eastern Indonesia) by 900 AD.

After their first contact with Spaniards, the islanders eventually became known as the Chamorros, a Spanish word similar to Chamori, the name of the Indigenous caste system's higher division.

The ancient people of the Marianas raised colonnades of megalithic-capped pillars called latte stones upon which they built their homes. The Spanish reported that by their arrival, the largest of these was already in ruins and that the Chamorros believed the ancestors who had erected the pillars lived in an era when people possessed supernatural abilities.

In 2013 archaeologists posited that the first people to settle in the Marianas may have made what was at that point the longest uninterrupted ocean-crossing voyage in human history. Archeological evidence indicates that Tinian may have been the first Pacific island to be settled.

=== Spanish possession ===
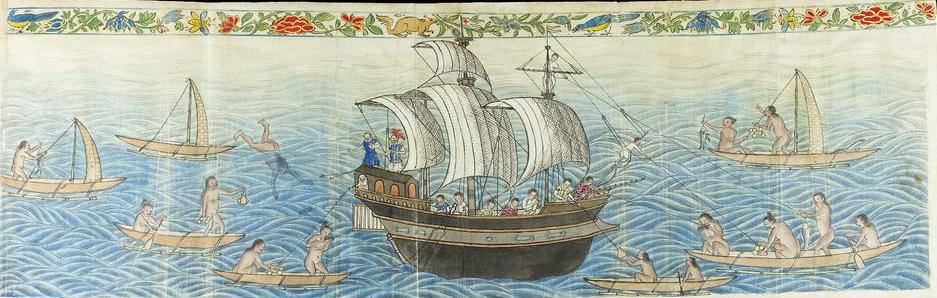
Reception of the Manila galleon by the Chamorro in the Ladrones Islands, c. 1590. From Boxer Codex.

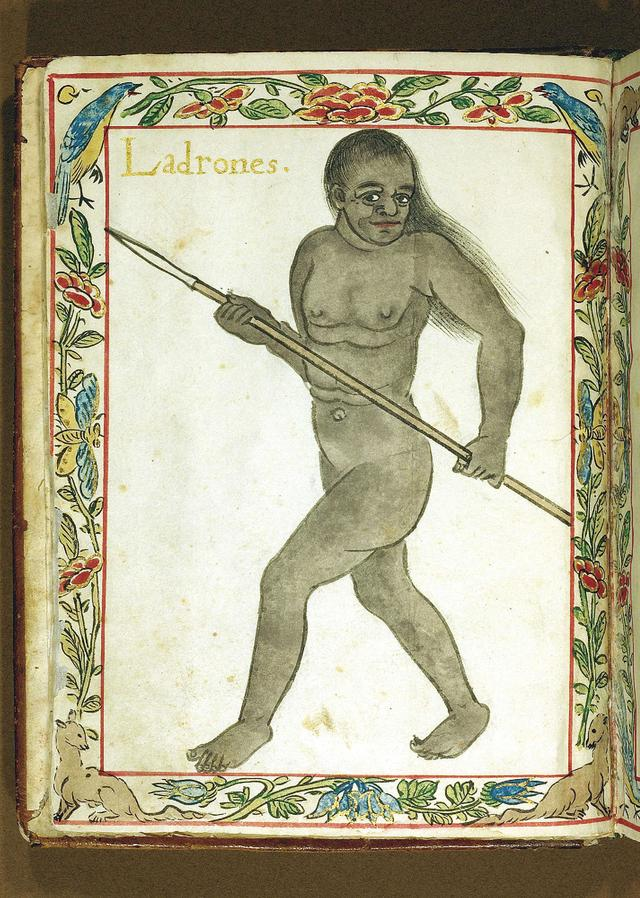
Chamorro Hunter with Spear, as depicted in the Boxer Codex (1590) of the Philippines

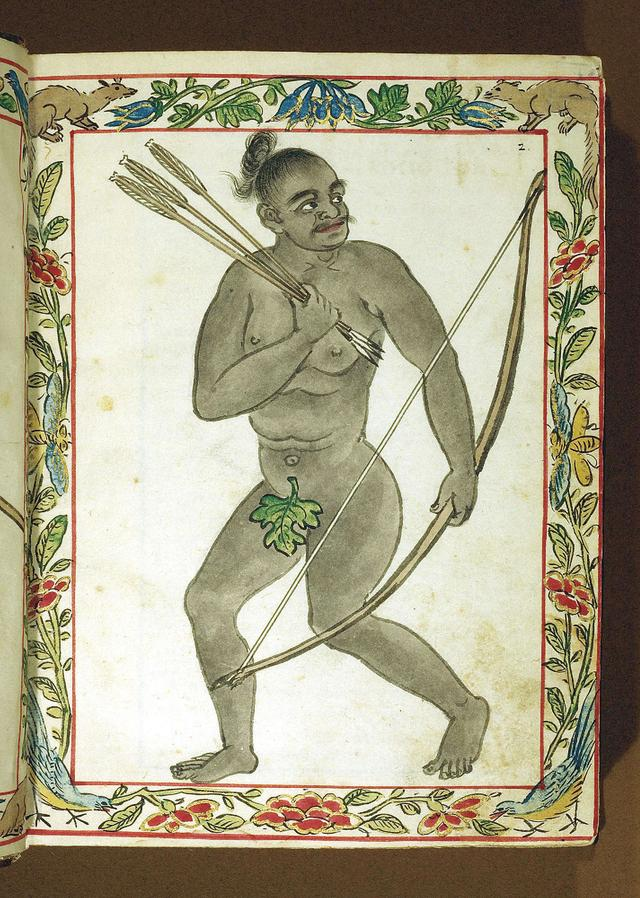
Chamorro Hunter with Bow, as depicted in the Boxer Codex (1590) of the Philippines

The Portuguese navigator Ferdinand Magellan, sailing under the Spanish flag, arrived in 1521. He and his crew were the first Europeans to arrive in the Mariana Islands. He landed on Guam, the southernmost island of the Marianas, and claimed the archipelago for Spain. The Spanish ships were met offshore by the native Chamorros, who delivered refreshments and then helped themselves to a small boat belonging to Magellan's fleet. This led to a cultural clash: in Chamorro tradition, little property was private, and taking something one needed, such as a boat for fishing, did not count as stealing. The Spanish did not understand this custom and fought the Chamorros until the boat was recovered. Three days after he had been welcomed on his arrival, Magellan fled the archipelago. Spain regarded the islands as annexed and later made them part of the Spanish East Indies in 1565. In 1734, the Spanish built a royal palace, the Plaza de España, in Guam for the governor of the islands. The palace was largely destroyed during World War II, but portions of it remain.

Guam operated as an important stopover between the Philippines and Mexico for the Manila galleon, which carried trading between Spanish colonies.

In 1668, Father Diego Luis de San Vitores renamed the islands Las Marianas in honor of his patroness, the Spanish regent Mariana of Austria (1634–1696), widow of Felipe IV (reigned 1621–1665).

Most of the islands' native population (90–95%) died from European diseases carried by the Spaniards or married non-Chamorro settlers under Spanish rule. New settlers from the Philippines and the Caroline Islands were brought to repopulate the islands. The Chamorro population gradually recovered, and Chamorro, Filipino, and Refaluwasch languages and other ethnic groups remain in the Marianas.

During the 17th century, Spanish colonists forcibly moved the Chamorros to Guam, to encourage assimilation and conversion to Roman Catholicism. By the time they were allowed to return to the Northern Marianas, many Carolinians from present-day eastern Yap State and western Chuuk State had settled in the Marianas. Both languages, as well as English, are now official in the commonwealth.

In 1720 the Spanish moved the remaining islanders, whose population had been decimated by diseases, from the Marianas to Guam. By 1741, there were about 5000 remaining Chamorros.

The Marianas and specifically the island of Guam were a stopover for Spanish galleons en route from Acapulco, Mexico, to Manila, Philippines, in a convoy known as the Galeon de Manila. In the 1818 Spanish Census of the Spanish-Philippines, of which, the Marianas islands was under the governance of the Philippine Islands, it was recorded to have had 7,555 souls and of which there were 160 Spanish soldiers from Spain and Mexico, garrisoning the Marianas.

==== Carolinian immigration ====
The Northern Marianas experienced an influx of immigration from the Carolines (Micronesia region) during the 19th century. Both this Carolinian sub-ethnicity and Carolinians in the Carolines archipelago refer to themselves as the Refaluwasch. The indigenous Chamorro word for the same group of people is gu'palao. They are usually referred to simply as "Carolinians", though, unlike the other two monikers, this can also mean those who live in the Carolines and may have no affiliation with the Marianas.

The conquering Spanish did not focus attempts at cultural suppression against Carolinian immigrants, whose immigration they allowed during a period when the indigenous Chamorro majority was being subjugated with land alienation and forced relocations. Carolinians in the Marianas continue to be fluent in the Carolinian language and have maintained many of the cultural distinctions and traditions of their ethnicity's land of ancestral origin.

=== German possession and Japanese mandate ===
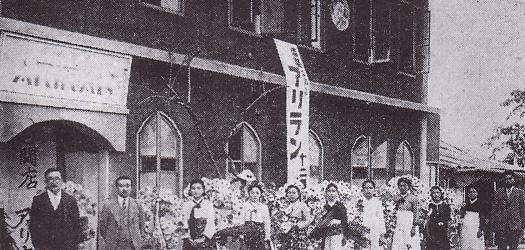
Saipan under the administration of the Empire of Japan

Following its loss during the Spanish–American War of 1898, Spain ceded Guam to the United States and sold the remainder of the Marianas (i.e., the Northern Marianas), along with the Caroline Islands, to Germany under the German–Spanish Treaty of 1899. The United States could have taken the entire Marianas, but beyond Guam, saw no need for the group. Germany administered the islands as part of its colony of German New Guinea and did little in terms of development.

Germany built an office on Saipan to administer the island, and the head administrator was Georg Fritz. San Jose church was built during the German period. The Germans established a public school system and homesteading program, and some efforts were put into copra production; there was an overall effort to grow the economy with roads being built and vocational/trades training. Pagan and Alamagan were leased to a company called Pagan Gesellschaft, which planned to produce copra there, although its goals were hampered by numerous typhoons. Eight islands were leased to bird hunters, which used the feathers for hats.

Early in World War I, Japan declared war on Germany and invaded the Northern Marianas. In 1919 after the war concluded, the League of Nations (LoN) awarded all of Germany's islands in the Pacific Ocean located north of the Equator, including the Northern Marianas, under mandate to Japan. Under this arrangement, the Japanese thus administered the Northern Marianas as part of the South Seas Mandate. During the Japanese period, sugar cane became the primary industry of the islands. Garapan on Saipan was developed as a regional capital, and numerous Japanese (including ethnic Koreans and Okinawan and Taiwanese) migrated to the islands. In the December 1939 census, the total population of the South Seas Mandate was 129,104, of whom 77,257 were Japanese (including ethnic Taiwanese and Koreans). On Saipan, the pre-war population comprised 29,348 Japanese settlers and 3,926 Chamorro and Caroline Islanders; Tinian had 15,700 Japanese settlers (including 2,700 ethnic Koreans and 22 ethnic Chamorro). The Japanese built military constructions on the island in the 1930s and, in December 1941, used it as a staging area to invade Guam, which was part of the U.S. at that time.

During the Japanese mandate, the main economic focus was sugar production, and for example, about 98% of Tinian island was used to grow sugarcane.

=== World War II ===
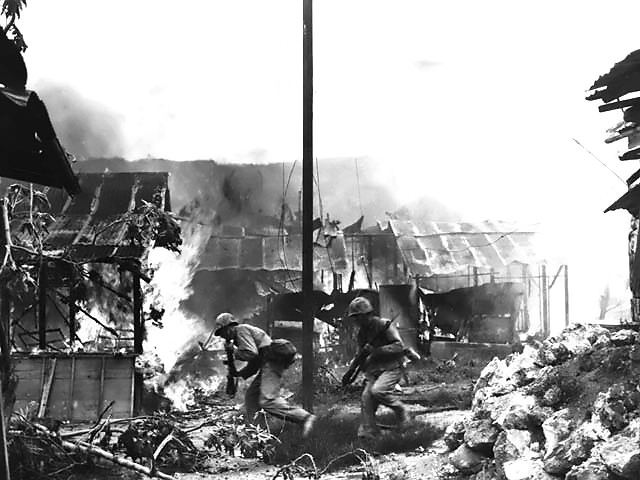
U.S. Marines in Garapan, Saipan

On December 8, 1941, hours after the attack on Pearl Harbor, Japanese forces from the Marianas launched an invasion of Guam. Chamorros from the Northern Marianas, which had been under Japanese rule for more than 20 years, were brought to Guam to assist the Japanese administration. This, combined with the harsh treatment of Guamanian Chamorros during the 31-month occupation, created a rift that would become the main reason Guamanians rejected the referendum on the reunification of Guam with the Northern Marianas that the Northern Marianas approved in the 1960s.

On June 15, 1944, the United States military invaded the Mariana Islands, starting the Battle of Saipan, which ended on July 9. Of the 30,000 Japanese troops defending Saipan, fewer than 1,000 remained alive at the battle's end. Many civilians were also killed, by disease, starvation, enemy fire, or suicide; about 1,000 civilians killed themselves by jumping off cliffs. U.S. forces then recaptured Guam on July 21, and invaded Tinian on July 24. A year later, Tinian was the takeoff point for the Enola Gay, the plane that dropped the atomic bomb on Hiroshima. Rota was left untouched (and isolated) until the Japanese surrender in August 1945, owing to its military insignificance and U.S. forces' strategy of "island hopping" in which they did not invade islands that they did not need.

The war did not end for everyone with the signing of the armistice. A large group of Japanese holdouts surrendered on Saipan on December 1, 1945. However, a group of about 30 held out until 1951 on Anatahan; their story was told in the film The Saga of Anatahan. On a related note, on Guam, Japanese soldier Shoichi Yokoi, unaware that the war had ended, hid in a jungle cave in the Talofofo area until 1972.

Japanese nationals were eventually repatriated to the Japanese home islands. After World War II, the people of Marianas were able to return to the Northern Marianas under the protection of the United Nations Trusteeship administered by the United States. During this time, a series of referendums took place.

=== United Nations trusteeship ends, Commonwealth begins ===
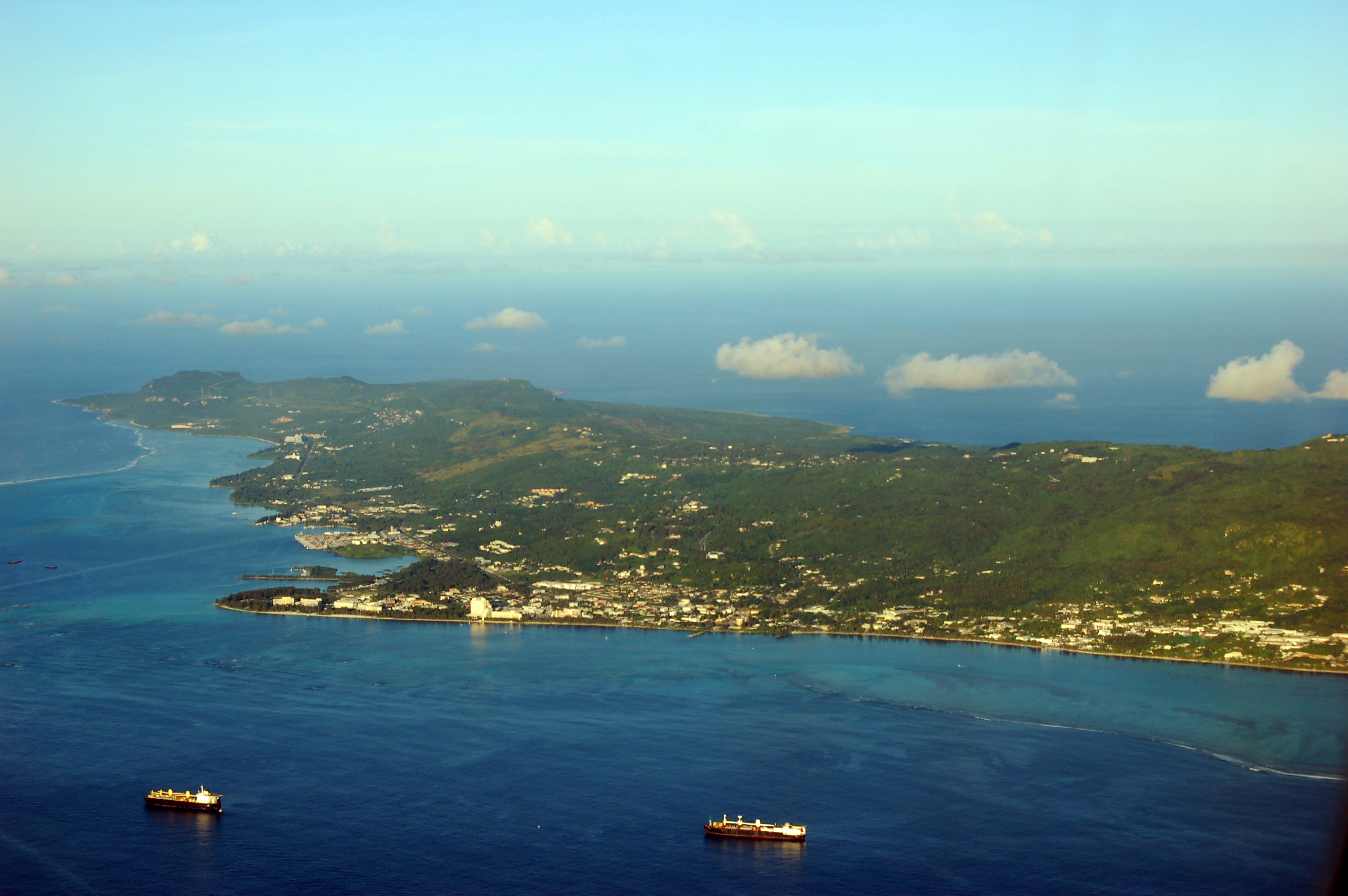
The island of Saipan

After Japan's defeat in World War II, the Northern Marianas were administered by the United States pursuant to Security Council Resolution 21 as part of the United Nations Trust Territory of the Pacific Islands, which assigned responsibility for defense and foreign affairs to the United States as trustee. Four referendums offering integration with Guam or changes to the islands' status were held in 1958, 1961, 1963 and 1969. On each occasion, a majority voted in favor of integration with Guam, but this did not happen: Guam rejected integration in a 1969 referendum.

In the 1975 Northern Mariana Islands status referendum nearly 80% voted to become a commonwealth of the United States, and in 1977 over 93% approved the constitution of the CNMI.

Map showing the Northern Mariana Islands and its exclusive economic zone (left) in the United States

The people of the Northern Mariana Islands decided in the 1970s not to seek independence, but instead to forge closer links with the United States. Negotiations for commonwealth status began in 1972, and a covenant to establish a commonwealth in political union with the United States was approved in a 1975 referendum. A new government and constitution came into effect in part on January 9, 1978, after being approved in a 1977 referendum. The United Nations approved this arrangement pursuant to Security Council Resolution 683. The Northern Mariana Islands came under U.S. sovereignty on November 4, 1986, and the islanders became US citizens. Also on November 4, 1986, the Northern Mariana Islands constitution became fully effective under the Covenant.

In May 1981, volcanic eruptions led to the evacuation of the island of Pagan. Most residents of Pagan have not yet returned to Pagan due to ongoing volcanic activity.

In the 1960s and 1970s, agriculture and ranching became an important activity with thousands of beef cattle, dairy cows, hogs, and many crops such as pineapple. The food production became an important source of food supply for the Marianas region.

The Chamorro-Carolinian Language Policy Commission was created in 1982 to carry out policies in support of the Chamorro and Carolinian languages and cultures.

In December 1986, 20 percent of the homes on Saipan were destroyed by Typhoon Kim, trees were stripped of foliage, thousands of coconut trees were knocked down, roads were blocked, and there was no electricity or public water supply for weeks.

In April 1990, the inhabitants of the western coast of Anatahan were evacuated after earthquake swarms and active fumaroles indicated that an eruption might be imminent, but no eruption occurred at that time. A further earthquake swarm occurred in May 1992. The first historical eruption of Anatahan occurred in May 2003, when a large explosive eruption with a VEI of 4 took place, forming a new crater inside the eastern caldera and causing an ash plume 12 km (7.5 mi) high which impaired air traffic to Saipan and Guam.

=== Twenty-first century ===
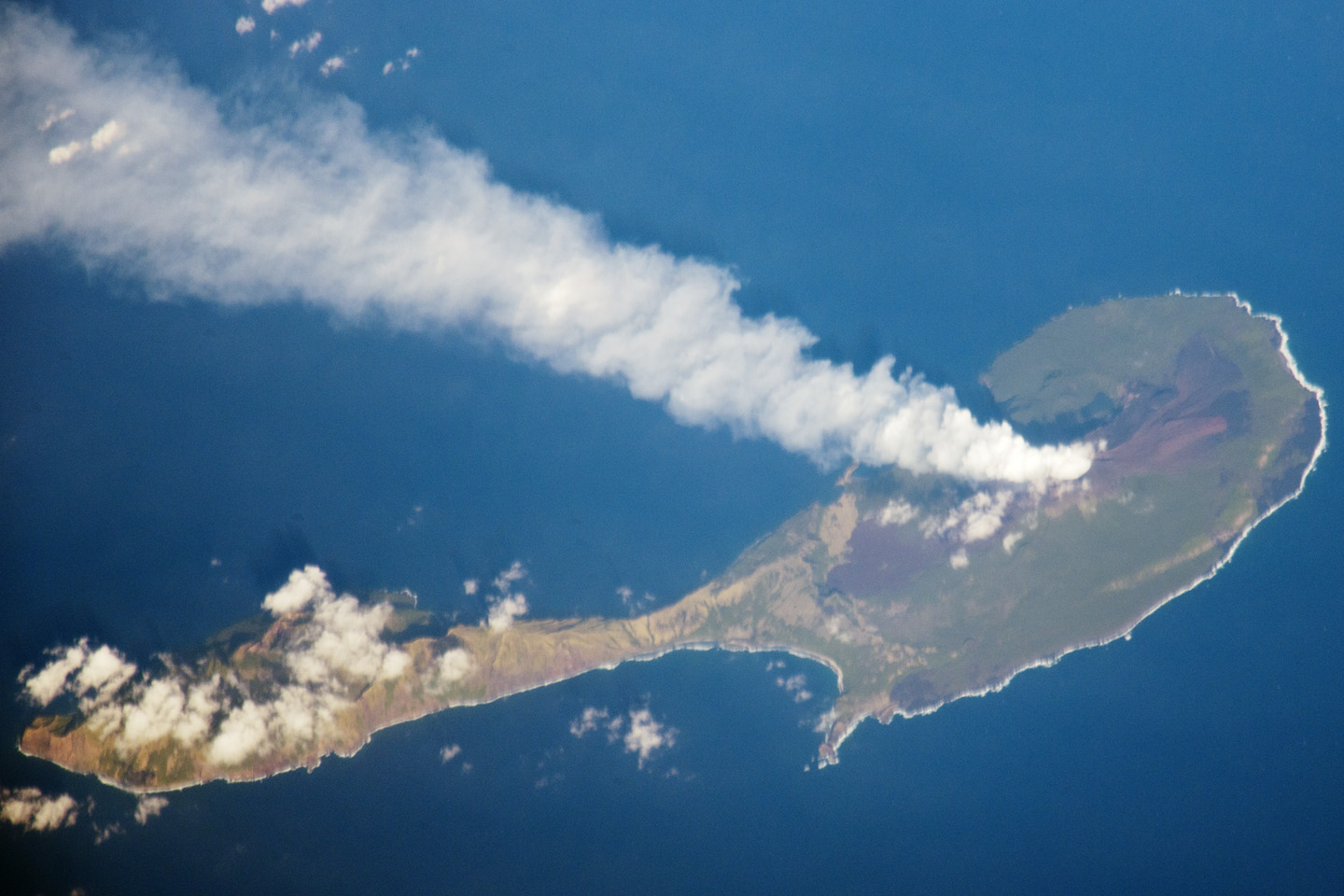
Pagan Island eruption in 2012

The Northern Mariana Islands does not have voting representation in the United States Congress, but, since 2009, has been represented in the U.S. House of Representatives by a delegate; congressional delegates may participate in debates and serve on congressional committees but may not cast decisive votes on the House floor. In the United States, a non-voting delegate is not a new concept, but rather goes back to before 1800. Territorial delegates represent their region's interest in Congress, and their powers have been established over time, beginning in 1795. A major power of the territorial delegates (which have also been called Resident Commissioners), besides serving on committees, is speaking on the floor. Perhaps more importantly, the position is seen as a precursor to establishing voting rights, and discussion about granting delegate voting rights has occurred.

In 2018, 18 people embarked on a mission to repopulate the northern islands of Alamagan and Agrihan. They left Saipan aboard MV Super Emerald; the families involved originally had come from Alamagan. The mayor's office coordinated the months-long project plans, including a clean water supply, establishment of radio contact, and hopefully sending more families to the two islands. One returning Marianan remarked, "I was born and raised on Saipan but my family is from Alamagan. We are going to live there for a long time." The 2020 United States Census reported a total of 7 people living on Alamagan and Agrihan.

Typhoon Yutu caused widespread damage in October 2018, and was the strongest typhoon known to hit the islands. Federal Emergency Management Agency (FEMA) personnel deployed to both Tinian and Saipan ahead of the storm. U.S. President Donald Trump declared an emergency for the Northern Islands on October 24, 2018.

== Geography ==
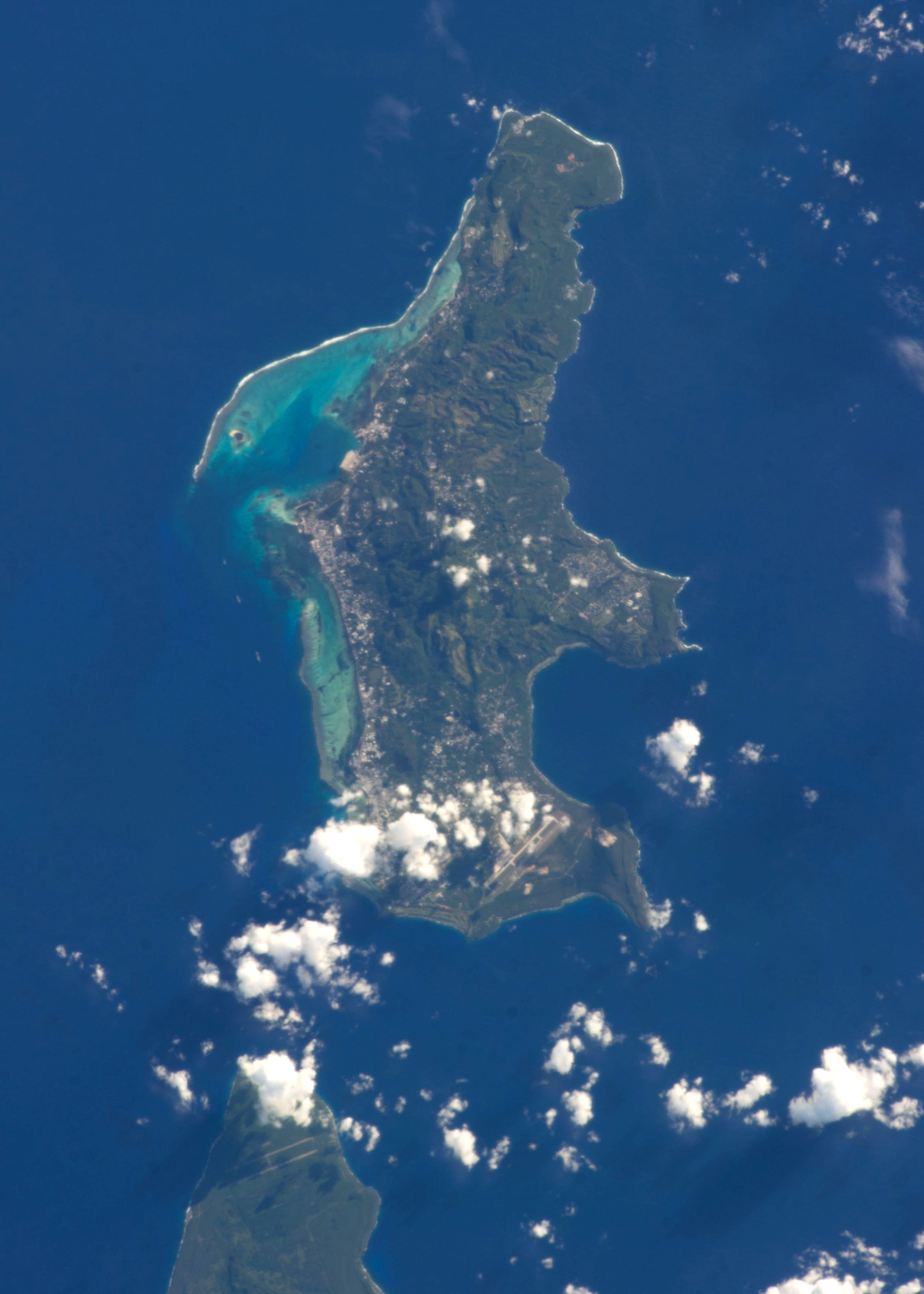
Saipan seen from the International Space Station

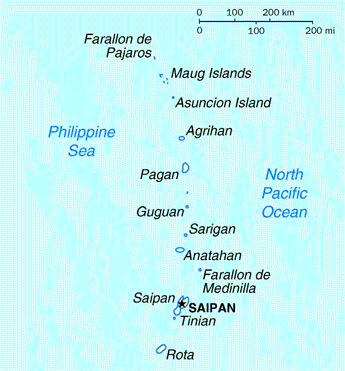
Map of the Northern Mariana Islands

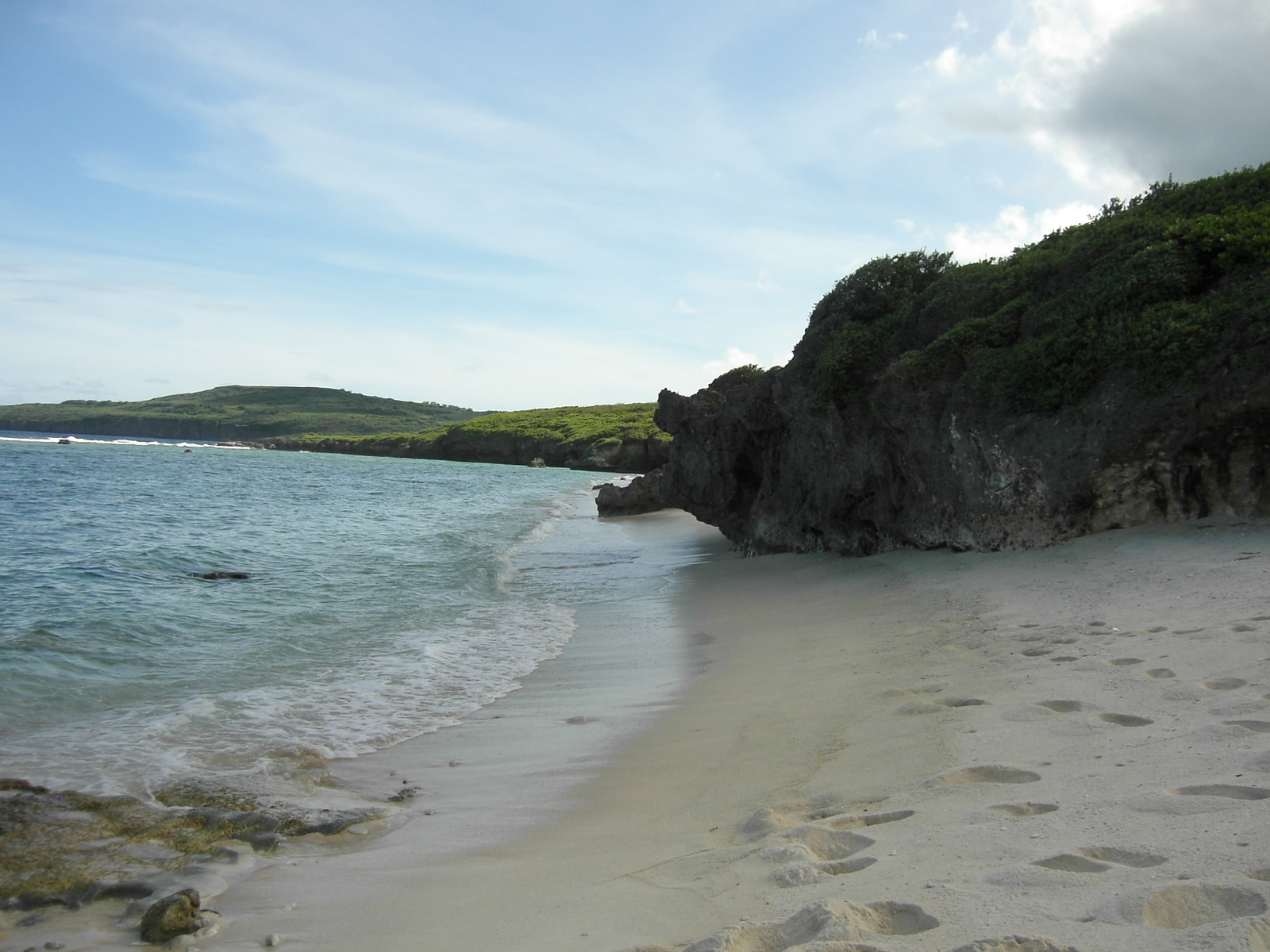
Long Beach, Tinian

The Northern Mariana Islands, together with Guam to the south, compose the Mariana Islands archipelago. The southern islands are limestone, with level terraces and fringing coral reefs. The northern islands are volcanic, with active volcanoes on several islands, including Anatahan, Pagan, and Agrihan. The volcano on Agrihan, Mount Agrihan, has the highest elevation at 3,166 feet (965 m). An expedition organized by John D. Mitchler and Reid Larson made the first complete ascent to the summit of this peak on June 1, 2018.

The islands going from north to south comprise 14 main islands, but some smaller islands are often grouped together. Also, Zealandia Bank can sometimes be an island, depending on the tide. In terms of area, it is smaller than Guam; however, as an island chain, it spans hundreds of kilometers/miles from the northernmost to the southernmost. Many islands have multiple names due to popular nicknames, usually of Spanish, Chamorro, or English origin. Many of the islands have had to be evacuated due to volcanic activity.

- Farallon de Pajaros (or Uracus)
- Maug Islands, actually three islands: North Island, East Island, and West Island
  - Supply Reef, about 10 km northwest of Maug, has an active submarine volcano and various corals; it rises within 8 meters of the surface.
- Asuncion Island
- Agrihan
- Pagan, mostly uninhabited since a 1981 eruption
- Alamagan
- Guguan
- Zealandia Bank, mostly submerged rocky outcrops that break the surface at low tide
- Sarigan
- Anatahan, had eruptions in 2003 and 2007–08
- Farallon de Medinilla
- Saipan
  - Mañagaha, small island west of Saipan
  - Bird Island, partially connected island on East of Saipan
  - Forbidden Island, partially connected island on South East of Saipan
- Tinian, a quiet rural island with many cattle ranches and historical sites
- Aguijan (Goat Island), an uninhabited island south of Tinian with many birds and goats
  - Naftan Rock
- Rota (also known as Friendly Island), also inhabited.

Anatahan Volcano is a small volcanic island 80 miles (130 km) north of Saipan. It is about 6 miles (10 km) long and 2 miles (3 km) wide. Anatahan began erupting from its east crater on May 10, 2003. It has since alternated between eruptive and calm periods. On April 6, 2005, an estimated 50,000,000 cubic feet (1,416,000 m^{3}) of ash and rock were ejected, causing a large, black cloud to drift south over Saipan and Tinian.

- Northernmost point – Farallon de Pajaros
- Easternmost point – Farallon de Medinilla
- Southernmost point – Puntan Malikok, Rota
- Westernmost point – Farallon de Pajaros

The islands lie in the Marianas tropical dry forests terrestrial ecoregion.

The ocean area to the east of the islands and parts of the islands themselves are part of the Marianas Trench Marine National Monument. This area includes three northernmost islands, the "Arc of Fire" refuge, which includes 21 underwater volcanic sites, and the trench region, which goes to the maximum limit of the EEZ. The nature preserve aims to protect the unique marine life, which includes seabirds, sea turtles, unique coral reefs, and life around under-sea vents. The Marianas Trench includes the deepest ocean water on the planet, along with other underwater wonders, including a pool of liquid sulfur located at Daikoku, an underwater volcano (see also Challenger Deep).

Guam is to the south of the CNMI and Rota. To the east is Wake Island, then further east is the island of Midway, and eventually, the start of the Hawaiian island chain. American Samoa is located to the east and south and lies below the Equator. To the north and east lies Alaska, specifically the chain of islands known as the Aleutians. To the west of the CNMI is the Philippines, and to the south and west is Palua, home to other Chamorro people. To the south and east is Micronesia, which is home to the Carolinian people, many of which also settled on the CNMI centuries ago.

Saipan has some additional semi-attached islets, including Bird Island, a nature reserve for birds. It is connected to Saipan only at low tide. Forbidden Island on the southeast side of Saipan is similar but larger.

=== Climate ===
The Northern Mariana Islands have a tropical rainforest climate (Köppen: Af) moderated by seasonal northeast trade winds, with little seasonal temperature variation. The dry season runs from December to June; the rainy season runs from July to November and can include typhoons. The Guinness Book of World Records has said Saipan has the most equable climate in the world.

Climate data for Saipan International Airport (1991–2020 normals, extremes 2000–present)
Month	Jan	Feb	Mar	Apr	May	Jun	Jul	Aug	Sep	Oct	Nov	Dec	Year
Record high °F (°C)	89 (32)	90 (32)	91 (33)	93 (34)	96 (36)	94 (34)	99 (37)	95 (35)	94 (34)	92 (33)	92 (33)	90 (32)	99 (37)
Mean daily maximum °F (°C)	84.1 (28.9)	84.0 (28.9)	84.9 (29.4)	87.1 (30.6)	88.2 (31.2)	88.4 (31.3)	87.8 (31.0)	87.2 (30.7)	87.2 (30.7)	86.6 (30.3)	86.5 (30.3)	85.7 (29.8)	86.5 (30.3)
Daily mean °F (°C)	79.5 (26.4)	79.1 (26.2)	80.0 (26.7)	82.0 (27.8)	83.1 (28.4)	83.4 (28.6)	82.9 (28.3)	82.4 (28.0)	82.2 (27.9)	81.8 (27.7)	81.9 (27.7)	81.0 (27.2)	81.6 (27.6)
Mean daily minimum °F (°C)	74.8 (23.8)	74.1 (23.4)	75.2 (24.0)	76.9 (24.9)	78.0 (25.6)	78.5 (25.8)	78.1 (25.6)	77.5 (25.3)	77.2 (25.1)	77.1 (25.1)	77.3 (25.2)	76.4 (24.7)	76.8 (24.9)
Record low °F (°C)	70 (21)	69 (21)	69 (21)	70 (21)	73 (23)	72 (22)	71 (22)	69 (21)	72 (22)	69 (21)	69 (21)	69 (21)	69 (21)
Average rainfall inches (mm)	3.65 (93)	2.50 (64)	1.96 (50)	2.75 (70)	3.12 (79)	4.24 (108)	7.43 (189)	12.86 (327)	11.42 (290)	10.72 (272)	5.21 (132)	3.78 (96)	69.64 (1,769)
Average rainy days (≥ 0.01 in)	17.4	15.3	14.2	16.4	17.9	20.2	24.3	23.9	23.3	24.5	20.7	18.9	237.0
Source: NOAA

== Politics and government ==
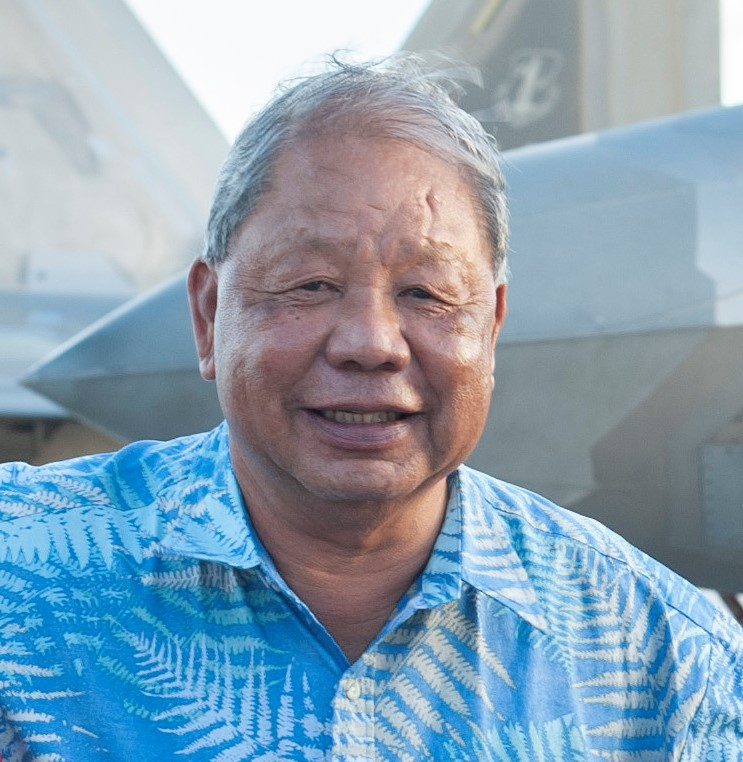
David M. Apatang, the governor of the Northern Mariana Islands

The Northern Mariana Islands have a multiparty presidential representative democratic system. They are a commonwealth of the United States. Federal funds to the commonwealth are administered by the Office of Insular Affairs of the U.S. Department of the Interior.

Replicating the separation of powers elsewhere in the United States, the executive branch is headed by the governor of the Northern Mariana Islands; legislative power is vested in the bicameral Northern Mariana Islands Commonwealth Legislature and the judicial power is vested in the CNMI Supreme Court and the trial courts inferior to it.

Some critics, including the author of the political website Saipan Sucks, say that politics in the Northern Mariana Islands is often "more a function of family relationships and personal loyalties" where the size of one's extended family is more important than a candidate's personal qualifications. They charge that this is nepotism carried out within the trappings of democracy.

In April 2012, anticipating a loss of funding by 2014, the commonwealth's public pension fund declared Chapter 11 bankruptcy. The retirement fund is a defined benefit-type pension plan and was only partially funded by the government, with only $268.4 million in assets and $911 million in liabilities. The plan experienced low investment returns and a benefit structure that had been increased without raises in funding.

In August 2012, cries for impeachment arose, as the sitting governor Benigno Fitial was being held responsible for withholding payments from the pension fund, not paying the local utility (Commonwealth Utilities or "CUC") for government offices, cutting off funding to the only hospital in the Northern Marianas, interfering with the delivery of a subpoena to his attorney general, withholding required funds from the public schools, and for signing a sole source $190 million contract for power generation.

Northern Mariana Islands' delegation to the 2016 Republican National Convention boasted about being "the most Republican territory" in the U.S. In 2017, the Republican Party had large majorities in both the Northern Mariana Islands Senate and the Northern Mariana Islands House of Representatives, though no party has a majority in either chamber as of 2023.

=== Administrative divisions ===
The islands total 179.01 square miles (463.63 km^{2}). The table gives an overview, with the individual islands listed from north to south:

No.	Islands/features	Area		Population (2020 census)	Height		Highest peak	Location
No.	Islands/features	sq mi	km^{2}	Population (2020 census)	feet	m	Highest peak	Location
Northern Islands (Northern Islands Municipality)
1	Farallon de Pajaros (Urracas)	0.985	2.55	—	1,047	319		20°33′N 144°54′E
	Supply Reef	0.00	0.00	—	−26	−8		20°08′N 145°6′E
2	Maug Islands including -North Island -East Island -West Island	0.822	2.13	—	745	227	North Island	20°02′N 145°19′E
3	Asuncion	2.822	7.31	—	2,923	891		19°43′N 145°41′E
4	Agrihan (Agrigan) (Note: evacuated 1990 due to volcanic eruptions)	16.80	43.51	4	3,166	965	Mount Agrihan	18°46′N 145°40′E
5	Pagan (Note: evacuated 1981 due to volcanic eruptions)	18.24	47.24	2	1,900	579	Mount Pagan	18°08′36″N 145°47′39″E
6	Alamagan	4.29	11.11	1	2,441	744	Alamagan	17°35′N 145°50′E
7	Guguan	1.494	3.87	—	988	301		17°20′N 145°51′E
	Zealandia Bank	0.0	0.0	—	0	0		16°45′N 145°42′E
8	Sarigan (Note: formerly inhabited (population of 21 in 1935, but only 2 in 1968))	1.92	4.97	—	1,801	549	—	16°43′N 145°47′E
9	Anatahan	12.05	31.21	—	2,582	787		16°22′N 145°40′E
10	Farallon de Medinilla	0.328	0.85	—	266	81		16°01′N 146°04′E
Southern Islands (3 municipalities)
11	Saipan	44.55	115.38	43,385	1,555	474	Mount Tapochau	15°11′06″N 145°44′28″E
12	Tinian	39.00	101.01	2,044	558	170	Kastiyu (Lasso Hill)	14°57′12″N 145°38′54″E
13	Aguijan (Agiguan) (Note: part of Tinian Municipality)	2.74	7.10	—	515	157	Alutom	14°42′N 145°18′E
14	Rota	32.97	85.39	1,893	1,611	491	Mount Manira	14°08′37″N 145°11′08″E
	Northern Mariana Islands	179.01	463.63	47,329	3,166	965	Mount Agrihan	14°08' to 20°33'N, 144°54° to 146°04'E
Notes

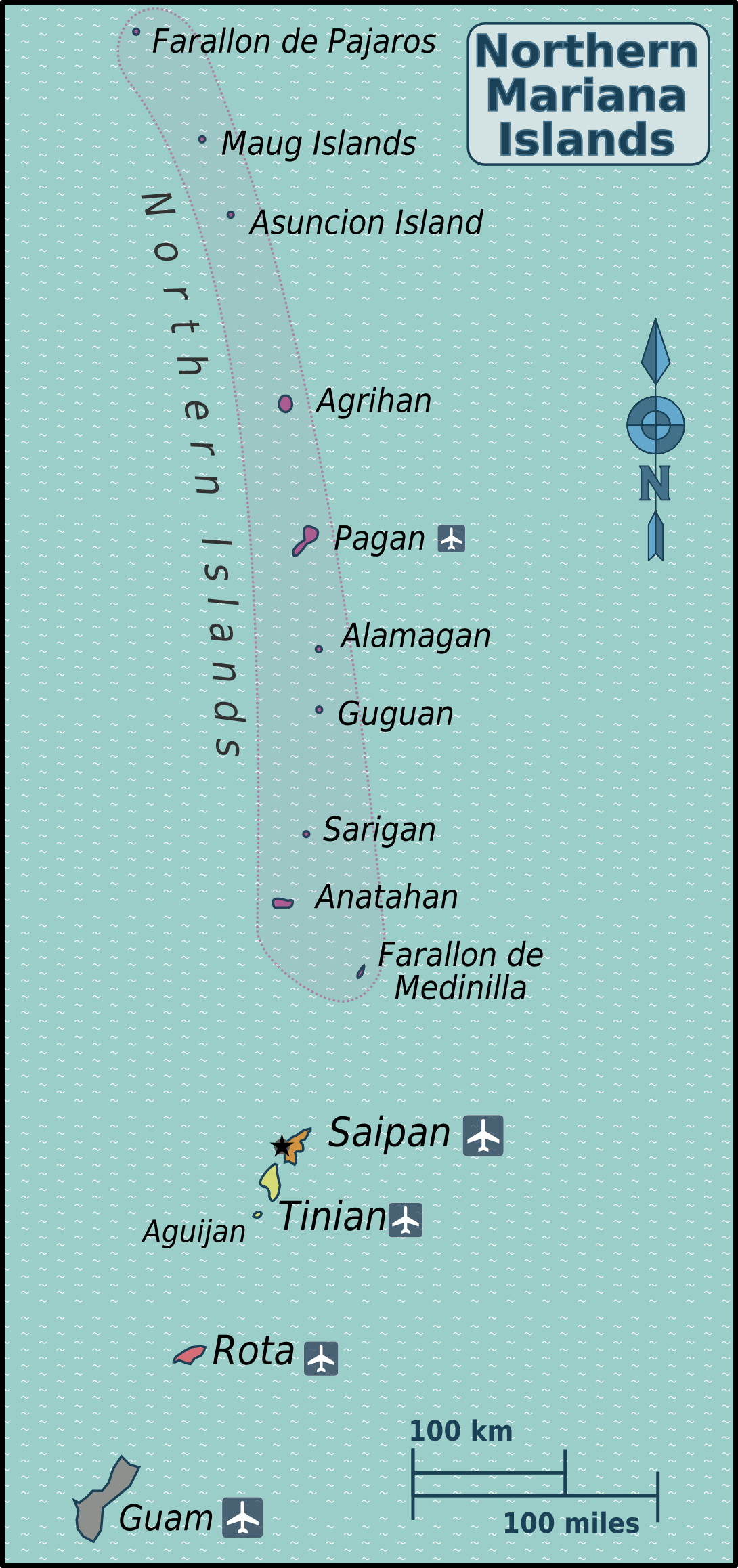
Map showing the four municipalities of the Northern Mariana Islands, with Guam shown for context and indicating which islands have airports

Administratively, the CNMI is divided into four municipalities:

The Northern Islands (north of Saipan) form the Northern Islands Municipality. The three main islands of the Southern Islands form the municipalities of Saipan, Tinian, and Rota, with uninhabited Aguijan forming part of Tinian municipality.

The northern islands have been evacuated because of a volcanic threat. Human habitation was limited to Agrihan, Pagan, and Alamagan, but the population varied due to various economic factors, including children's education. The 2020 census showed only seven residents in the Northern Islands Municipality, and the Northern Islands' mayor's office is located in "exile" on Saipan.

Saipan, Tinian, and Rota have the only ports and harbors and are the only permanently populated islands.

For statistical purposes, the United States Census Bureau counts the four municipalities of the Northern Mariana Islands as county equivalents.

=== Political status and autonomy ===
In 1947, the Northern Mariana Islands became part of the post–World War II United Nations Trust Territory of the Pacific Islands (TTPI). The United States became the TTPI's administering authority under the terms of a trusteeship agreement. In 1976, Congress approved the mutually negotiated Covenant to establish a Commonwealth of the Northern Mariana Islands in Political Union with the United States of America. The Covenant was codified on March 24, 1976, as Public Law 94-241. The Commonwealth of the Northern Mariana Islands (CNMI) government adopted its own constitution in 1977, and the new government took office in January 1978. Implementation of the Covenant, which took effect on January 1, 1978, was completed on November 3, 1986, pursuant to Presidential Proclamation no. 5564; which placed into effect the Covenant With the Commonwealth of the Northern Mariana Islands, and the Compacts of Free Association With the Federated States of Micronesia and the Republic of the Marshall Islands. This allowed the CNMI to be represented to the United States Government in Washington, DC by a Resident Representative, elected at-large by CNMI voters and whose office was paid for by the CNMI government. The Consolidated Natural Resources Act of 2008 ("CNRA"), approved by the U.S. Congress on May 8, 2008, established a CNMI delegate's seat; Democrat Gregorio Sablan was elected in November 2008 as the first CNMI delegate and took office in the 111th Congress. Like the other five delegates in the House, the CNMI delegate participates in debates and committee votes but has no vote on the floor of the House of Representatives and has no role in the U.S. Senate, but is equal to a Senator when serving on a conference committee.

On December 22, 1990, the United Nations Trusteeship Council terminated the TTPI as it applied to the CNMI and five other of the TTPI's original seven districts (the Marshall Islands and the Federated States of Micronesia (Chuuk, Kosrae, Pohnpei and Yap)), this was acknowledged in United Nations Security Council Resolution 683 passed on the same day.

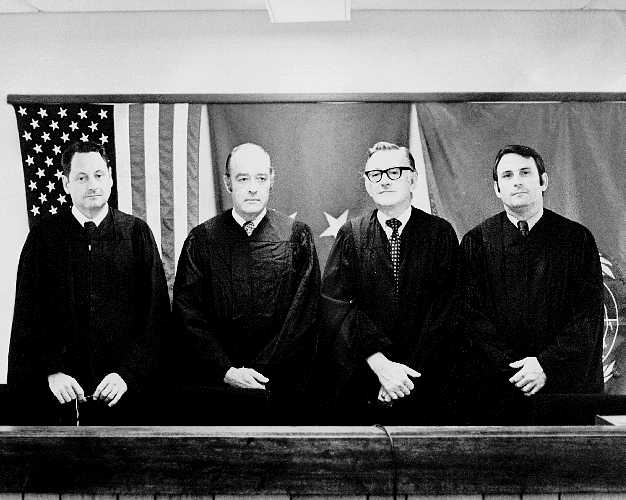
TTPI High Court judges (some time between 1968 and 1978)

Under the Covenant, only certain provisions of the U.S. Constitution apply to the Commonwealth, and legislation passed by the U.S. Congress can only apply to the Commonwealth if it applies to all 50 states. The CNMI is outside the customs area of the United States and bona fide residents of the Commonwealth are exempt from U.S. federal income tax, as is the case in the four self-governing territories. According to the Covenant, the federal minimum wage and federal immigration laws "will not apply to the Northern Mariana Islands except in the manner and to the extent made applicable to them by the Congress by law after termination of the Trusteeship Agreement." Local control of minimum wage was superseded by the United States Congress in 2007; it was slowly raised until in 2015 it reached parity with the 50 states.

Initially, under the Covenant, a separate immigration system existed in the CNMI, and U.S. immigration law did not apply. Still, the Covenant gave the United States power of reservation over immigration law in the Commonwealth. After reports surfaced of abusive practices for immigrant workers, on November 28, 2009, the United States exercised its power of reservation; specifically, CNRA § 702(a) amended the Covenant to state that "the provisions of the 'immigration laws' (as defined in section 101(a)(17) of the Immigration and Nationality Act (8 U.S.C. 1101(a)(17))) shall apply to the Commonwealth of the Northern Mariana Islands." Further, under CNRA § 702(a), the "immigration laws," as well as the amendments to the Covenant, "shall...supersede and replace all laws, provisions, or programs of the Commonwealth relating to the admission of aliens and the removal of aliens from the Commonwealth." Transition to U.S. immigration laws began November 28, 2009.

=== Judicial system ===
Cases under federal law are heard by the District Court for the Northern Mariana Islands, which was established by act of Congress in 1977, and began operations in January 1978. The court sits on the island of Saipan but may sit in other places within the commonwealth. The district court has the same jurisdiction as all other United States district courts, including diversity jurisdiction and bankruptcy jurisdiction. Appeals are taken to the Ninth Circuit. As a United States territorial court established under Congress's territorial power granted by Article IV of the United States Constitution, judges do not have lifetime appointments, unlike the Article III courts in the 50 states, District of Columbia, and Puerto Rico.

Cases under territorial law are heard by the Superior Court of the Commonwealth of the Northern Mariana Islands, with appeals heard by the Supreme Court of the Commonwealth of the Northern Mariana Islands.

In June 2024, Julian Assange pleaded guilty in a court in Saipan, the capital of the US territory, before flying home to Australia.

=== Citizenship ===
Article III of the Covenant conferred United States citizenship on legally qualified CNMI residents, which generally included all citizens of the CNMI, and established U.S. birthright citizenship for persons born in the CNMI. The CNMI has a number of special visa programs and conditions, one of the latest was the CNMI Long-Term Resident Status program. However, the visa exemptions for Guam-CNMI are more restrictive than the general U.S. Visa Waiver Program. Still, they need to become residents of a U.S. state or Washington, D.C. to be able to vote in presidential elections. Per the terms of the covenant, since 1986, the Northern Marianas have the right of jus soli; children born there, as anywhere in the U.S., are citizens at birth. This has also made the CNMI a refuge for pregnant women who escape authoritarian regimes in East Asia: when their child is born in the Northern Marianas it can be a U.S. citizen. There are a number of serious restrictions on immigration and citizenship rules in the CNMI. For example, it is not possible to apply for asylum before 2030. The U.S. has tried to work with Asian countries and local Marianas to create a realistic balance that allows access but not abuse of the CNMI system and realistic pathways to citizenship according to the rules of the United States and a respect for human situations.

== Economy ==
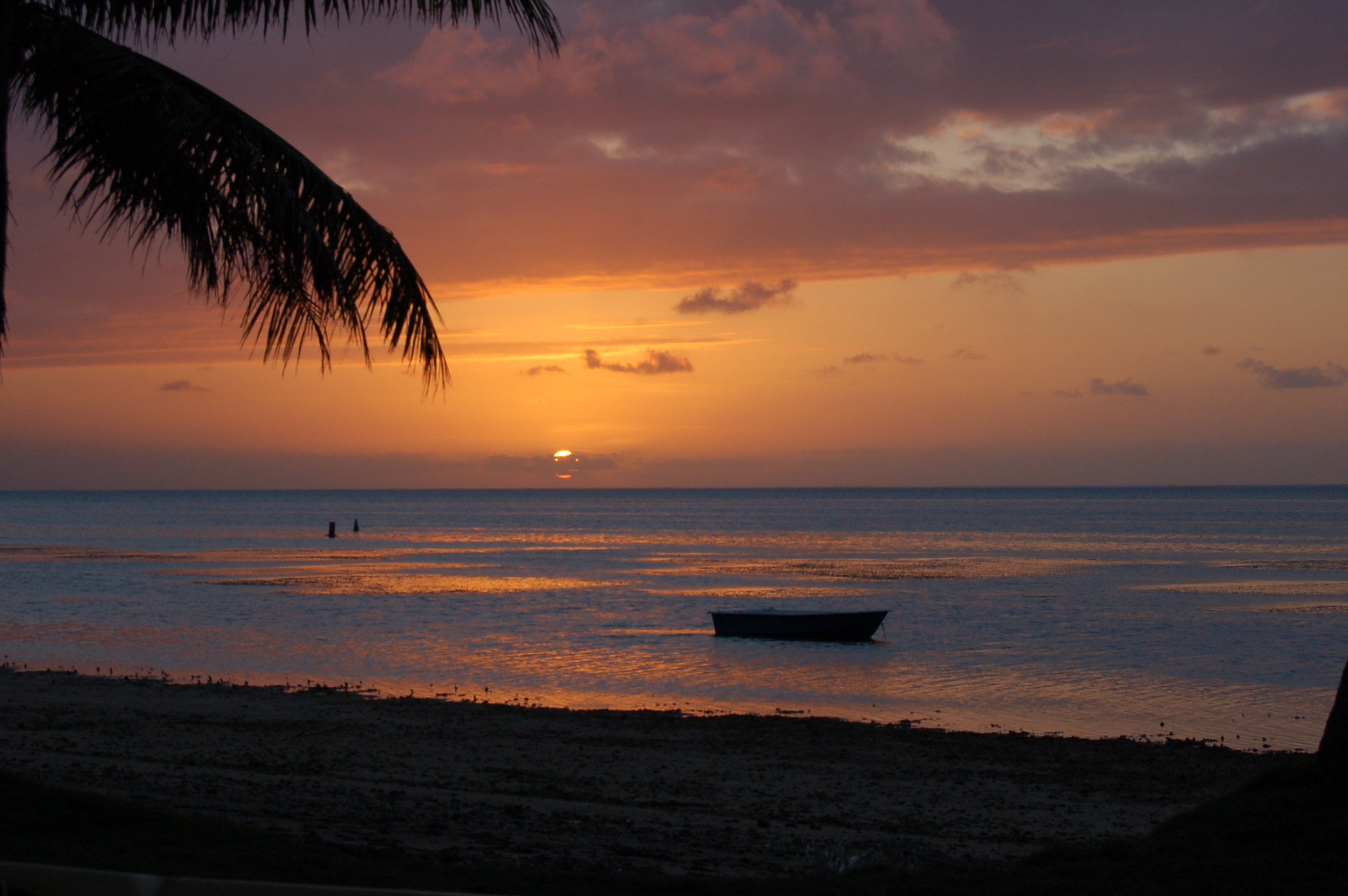
Saipan sunset

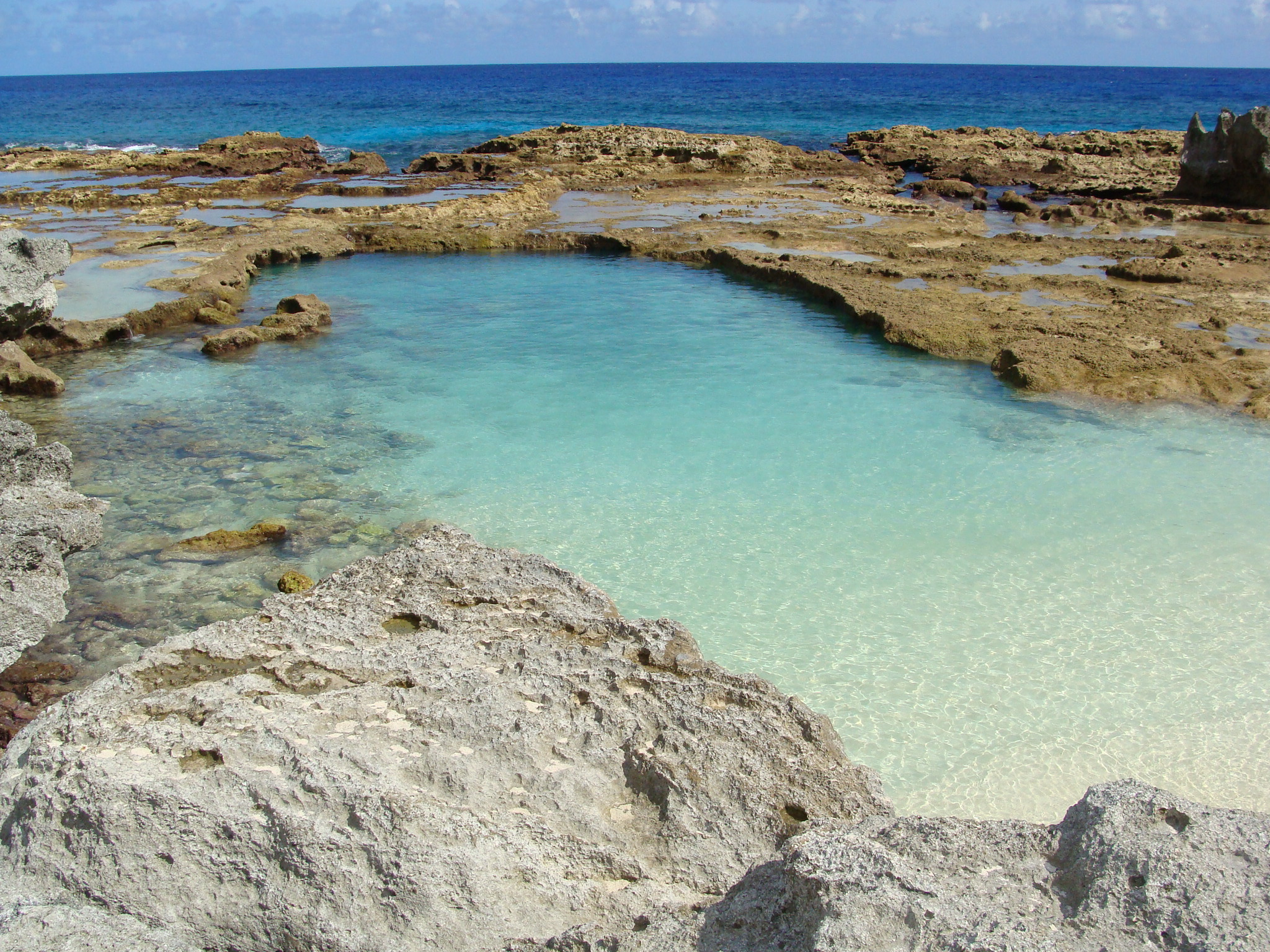
Rota's natural seawater swimming hole

The Commonwealth of the Northern Mariana Islands benefits from its trading relationship with the federal government of the United States and cheap trained labor from Asia. The CNMI's economy has historically relied on tourism, mostly from Japan, and the garment manufacturing sector. The economy has declined since quotas were lifted in 2005, eventually leading all the garment factories in Saipan to close by February 2009. Tourism also declined after 2005 when Japan Airlines stopped serving the Marianas.

Agricultural production, primarily of tapioca, cattle, coconuts, breadfruit, tomatoes, and melons, is relatively unimportant in the economy, representing only 1.7% of CNMI GDP as of 2016. It remains important for the community, and the Marianas, with their thousands of cattle and rich soils, are important for feeding the region, with Tinian being known as the breadbasket of the Marianas. The cattle herds in the CNMI supply beef not only locally but also to Guam, Palau, and Micronesia. Some of the cattle breeds on Tinian in the 21st century include Senepol, Brangus (Brahman X Angus), Red Angus, and American Brahman, and various modern ranching techniques are utilized.

Non-native islanders are not allowed to own land but can lease it.

=== Tourism ===
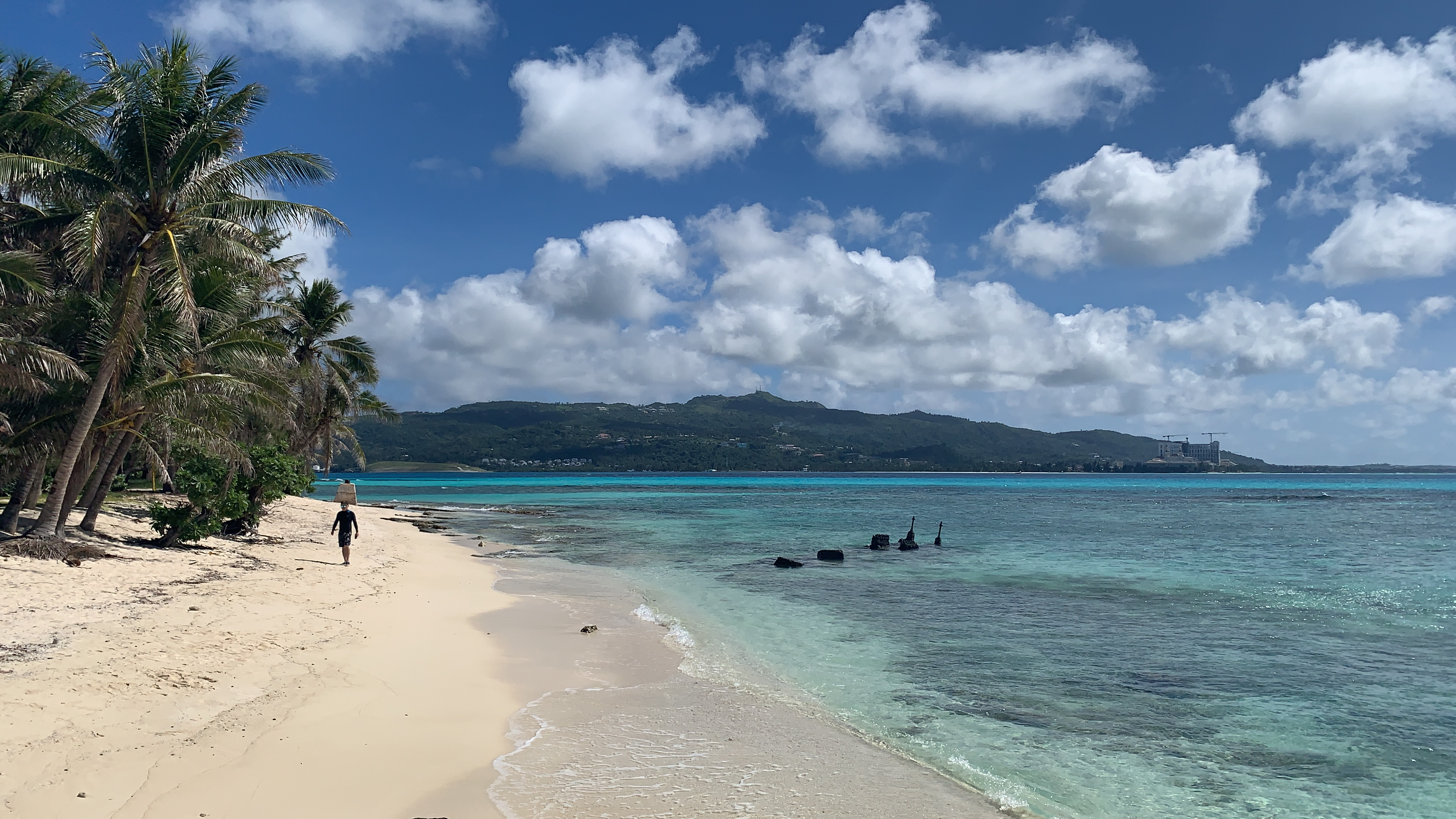
Looking at Saipan from Managaha

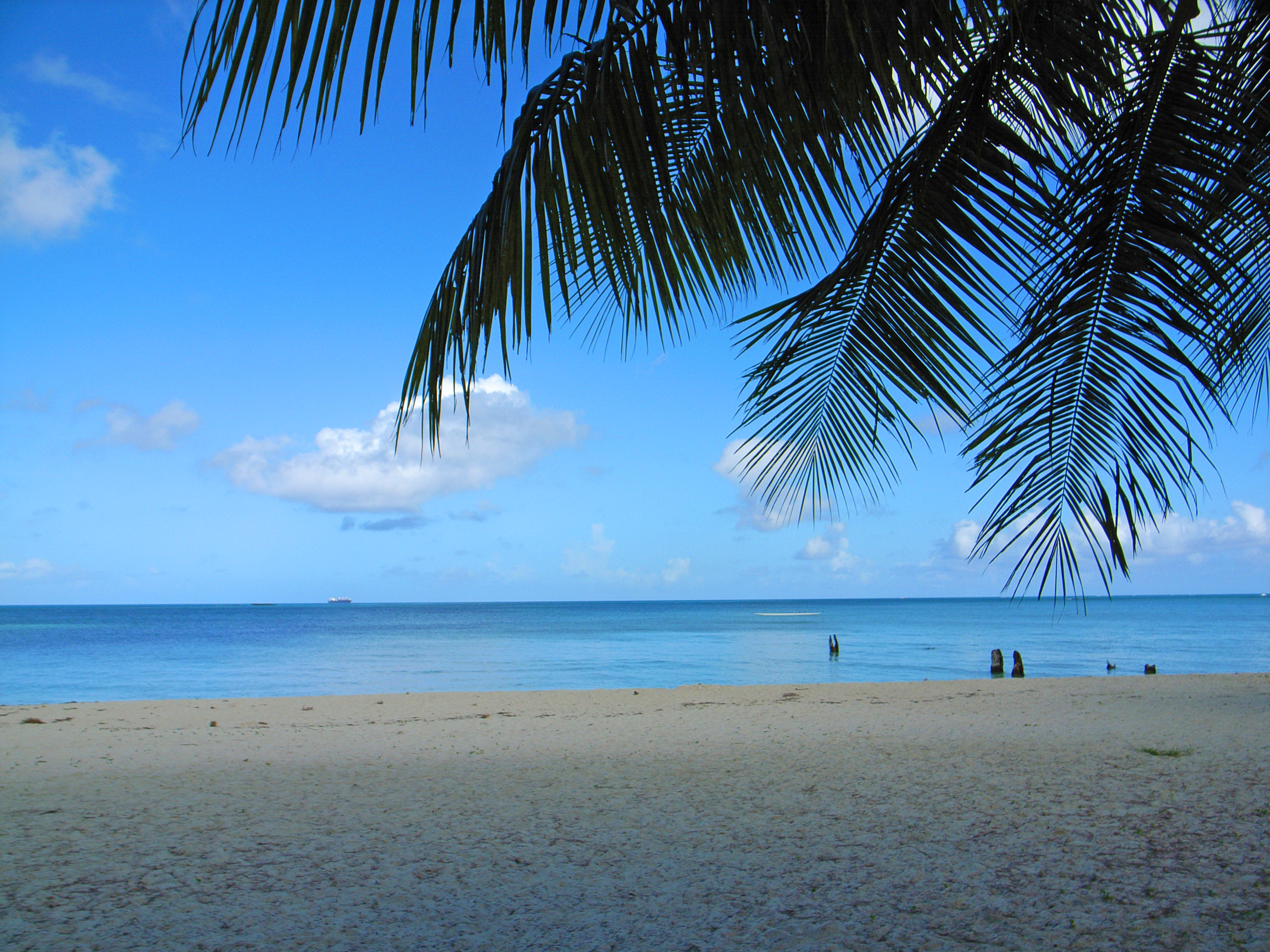
Micro Beach view

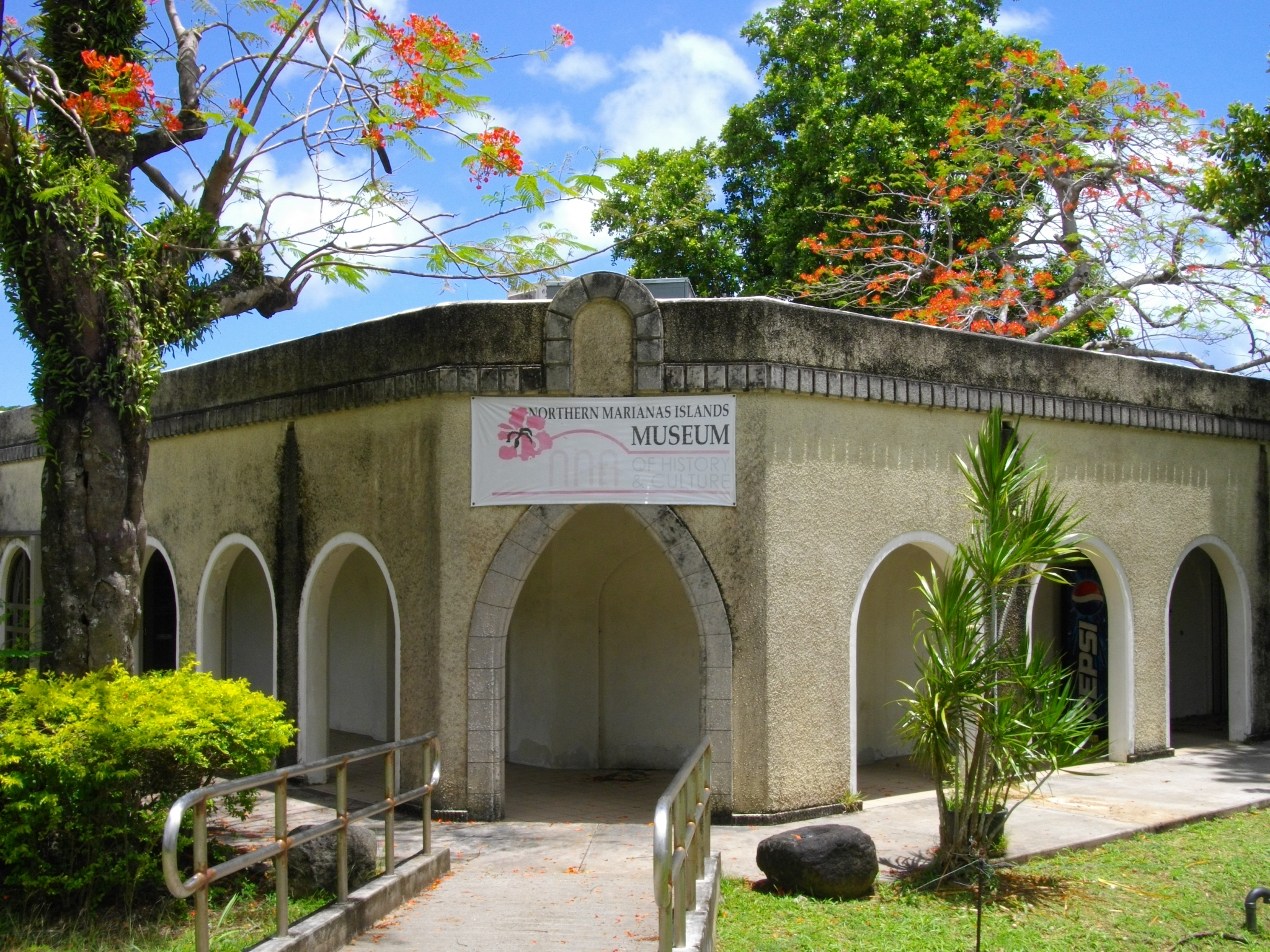
Northern Marianas Islands Museum

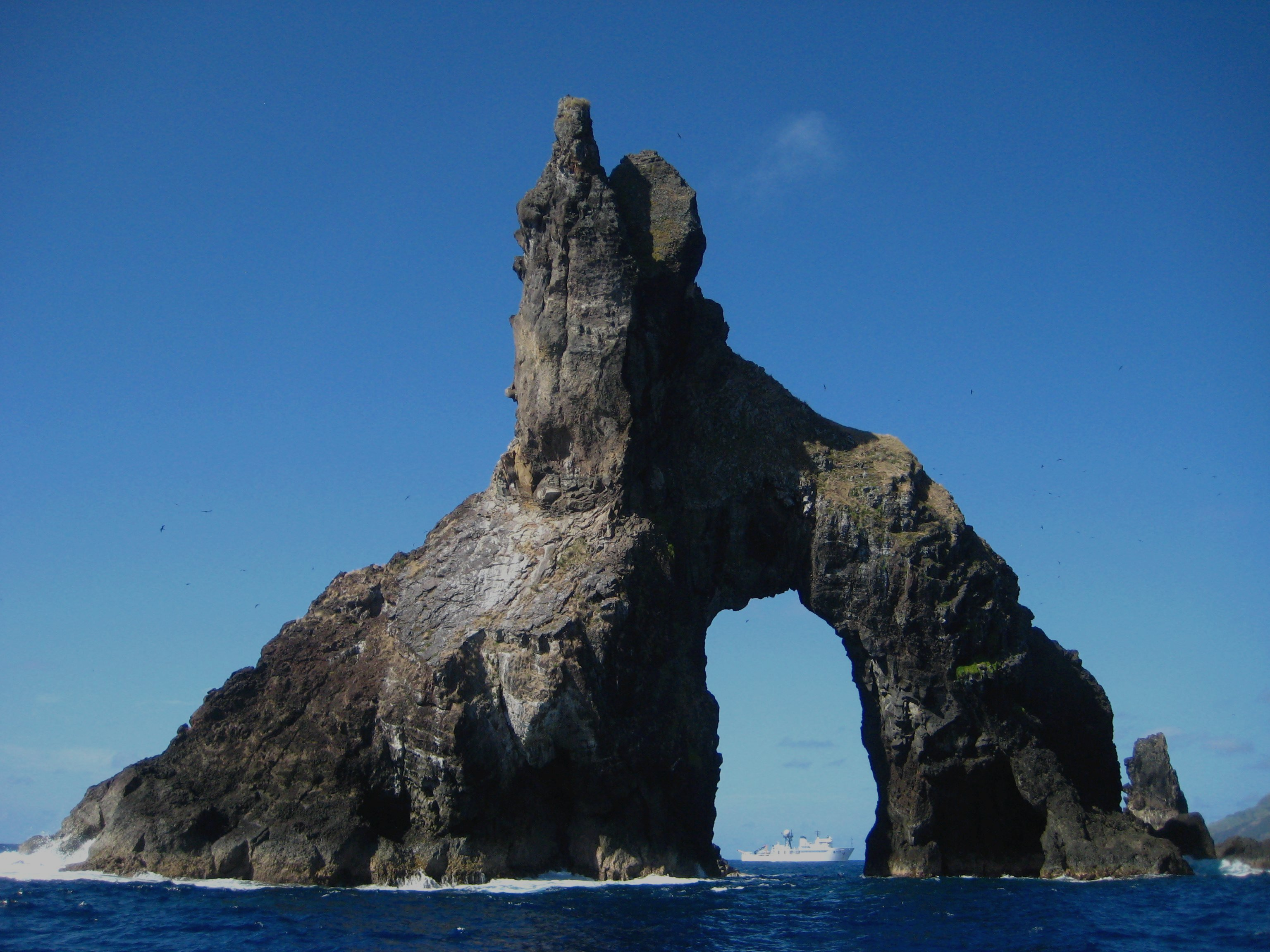
Pagan Island's natural stone arch

Tourism is popular; several hundred thousand people visit the CNMI in a typical year, and one of the highest years was 1997 when over 760,000 people visited the islands.

Tourism was strong in 2019, comprising visitors mainly from China and South Korea. Tourism dropped during the pandemic, and has been slow to recover since it ended. Direct flights from Japan have decreased, and the political issues between the US and China have stopped all flights from China (except from Hong Kong) to Saipan. CNMI hopes to attract tourists again from Japan, requiring direct flights to increase between Saipan and Japanese cities. The market in 2023 and 2024 for tourism was about half the 2019, pre-pandemic level, relying on tourists from South Korea. "The number of tourists recovered to over 194,600 in fiscal 2023 from some 5,370 in fiscal 2021 and about 69,530 in fiscal 2022 thanks to the return of South Koreans, according to the MVA data." Some travel experts suggest that CNMI change its image from a low-cost destination to a slightly fancier destination.

Activities known to be popular are jungle hikes, golfing, diving, and historical sites such as prehistoric stones. One of the golf courses was designed by professional champion golfer Greg Norman. A tourism hot spot is Managaha Island, which must be accessed by ferry and has various bbq vendors, water sport activities, and has wide sandy beaches surrounding a tropical forest.

Tourists from the U.S. do not need a visa, while those from other countries that qualify for ESTA or the Guam-CNMI Visa Waiver Program can usually stay for up to 45 or 90 days.

Noted tourist destinations in the CNMI include:

- Managaha Island (100-acre tropical beach island visited by ferry)
- American Memorial Park
- Micro Beach, a 1 km beach on the west side, so it is possible to see the sunset.
- San Juan beach, with a unique stone formation that is known for resembling a crocodile.
- Rad/Ladder/Coral Beach on the southern part of Saipan is about 100 yards long and is mostly coral fragments. It is popular for local barbeques and beach running.
- Obyan Beach is a long south beach known for its colorful underwater life.
- Taga Beach (on Tinian Island) is the largest beach known for its sunset views.
- Latte Stones Quarry (an ancient stone quarry of the Chamorro people)
- Mount Tapochau (highest point with views of Saipan), this site is known for its views, and it is possible to see other islands on a clear day and is topped by a statue of Jesus Christ.
- Kalabera Cave (features ancient cave drawings)
- Last Command Post (The final Japanese command post in the Battle of Saipan)
- Bird Island Sanctuary beach (beach by Bird Island sanctuary), faces east. There is also a Bird Island observatory to the south for observing the birds)
- Forbidden Island, this small island connected to Saipan, is connected at low tide and can be hiked onto, but the water separates it at high tide. There is a lookout near this small island.
- Japanese Lighthouse (a lighthouse built in 1934 when the Northern Marianas were in the Japanese Mandate, currently a cafe with island views)
- NMI Museum of History and Culture
- The Grotto, on Saipan, is a large underwater limestone cavern.
- Birth tourism, became more popular in the 2010s century with mothers coming from Asia to give birth, thus giving the baby a chance to be a U.S. Citizen.

=== Labor controversies ===
The Northern Mariana Islands had successfully used its position as a free trade area with the U.S., while at the same time not being subject to the same labor laws. For example, the Commonwealth's $3.05 per hour minimum wage, which lasted from 1997 to 2007, was lower than in the U.S., and some other worker protections are weaker, leading to lower production costs. That allowed garments to be labeled "Made in USA" without complying with all U.S. labor laws. However, the U.S. minimum wage law signed by President George W. Bush on May 25, 2007, resulted in stepped increases in the Northern Marianas' minimum wage, which allowed it to reach the U.S. level in 2015. The first step (to $3.55) became effective July 25, 2007, and a yearly increase of $0.50 will take effect every May thereafter until the CNMI minimum wage equals the nationwide minimum wage. However, a law signed by President Obama in December 2009 delayed the yearly increase from May to September. In 2018, the minimum wage finally reached $7.25, matching the U.S. federal minimum wage.

The island's exemption from U.S. labor laws had led to many alleged exploitations, including recent claims of sweatshops, child labor, child prostitution, and forced abortions.

An immigration system mostly outside of federal U.S. control (which ended on November 28, 2009) resulted in many Chinese migrant workers (about 15,000 during the peak years) being employed in the islands' garment trade. However, the lifting of World Trade Organization restrictions on Chinese imports to the U.S. in 2005 had put the commonwealth-based trade under severe pressure, leading to a number of factory closures. Along with the U.S.-imposed scheduled wage increases, the last factories were closed in early 2009 and the garment industry became extinct.

=== Infrastructure ===
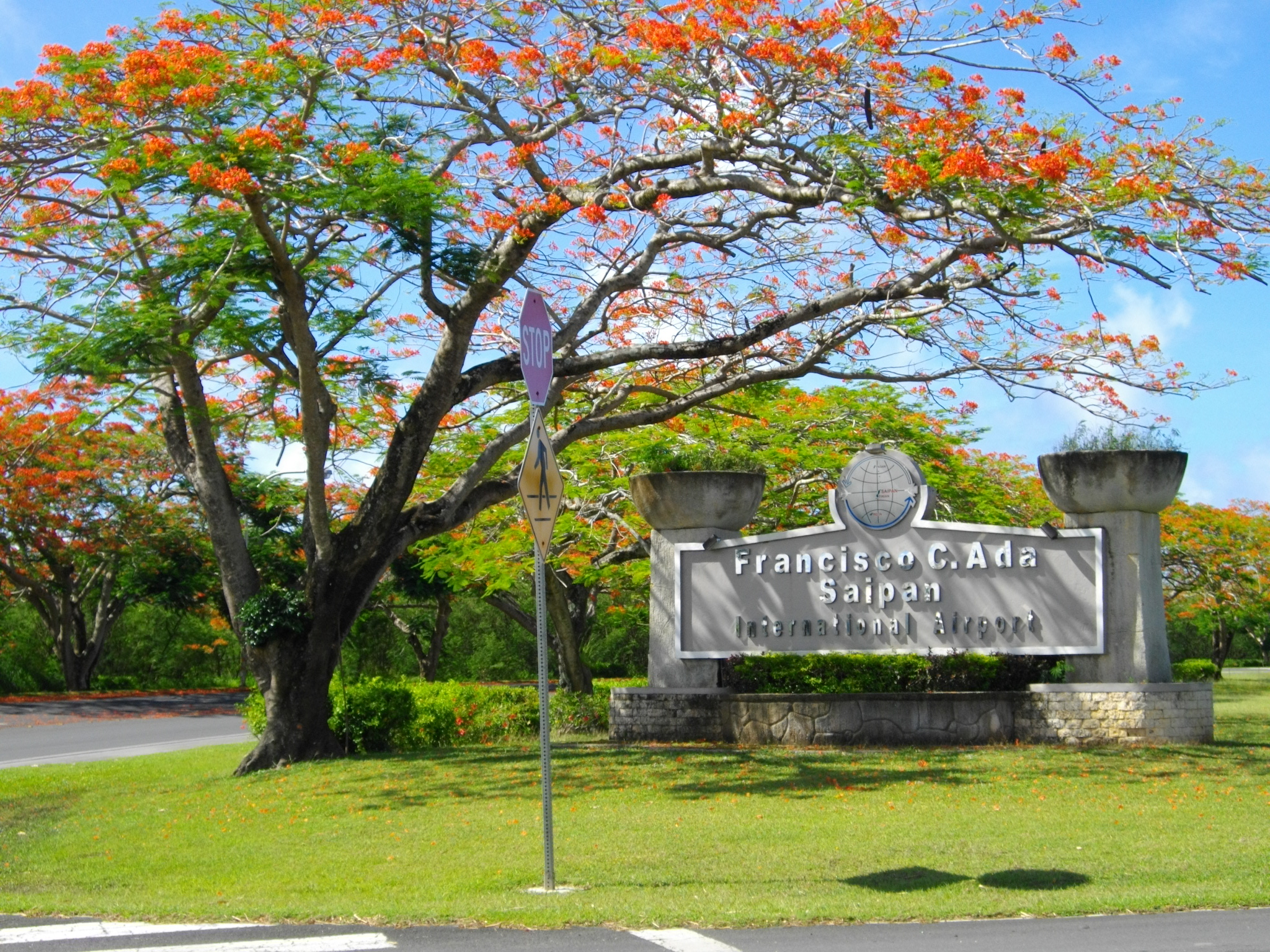
Saipan International Airport entrance

The islands have more than 220 miles (350 km) of highways, three airports with paved runways (one about 9,800 feet (3,000 m) long; two around 6,600 feet (2,000 m)), three airports with unpaved runways, and one heliport. The main commercial airport is Saipan International Airport.

Commuter airline Star Marianas Air provides short-haul flights between Guam, Saipan, Tinian, and Rota. International carriers connect Saipan with Korea, China, and Japan; flights to the U.S. mainland typically connect through Guam or Hawaiʻi.

In addition to by air, inter-island travel within the commonwealth is possible via ferry or chartered vessel services. For example, to visit Pagan is a 200-mile (320 km) boat trip.

Mail service for the islands is provided by the U.S. Postal Service (USPS). Each major island has its own ZIP code in the 96950–96952 range, and the USPS two-letter abbreviation for the CNMI is MP ("Marianas Pacific", NM and MI being taken). "CM" has been used previously and is still used in some contexts, but can be confused with Cameroon. For phone service, the islands are included in the North American Numbering Plan, using area code 670.

Television service is provided by KPPI-LD, Channel 7, which simulcasts Guam's ABC affiliate, KTGM, as well as WSZE, Channel 10, which simulcasts Guam's NBC affiliate, KUAM-TV. About 10 radio stations broadcast within the CNMI.

In 2012, Slate reported that CNMI internet prices were five times those of Guam and that the price per megabit increases if a customer chooses a higher-level internet package due to the limited bandwidth. In 2023, some Federal funding for improving broadband was allocated to the territory.

== Demographics ==
Historical population
Census	Pop.	Note	%±
1960	8,286		—
1970	9,436		13.9%
1980	16,780		77.8%
1990	43,345		158.3%
2000	69,221		59.7%
2010	53,883		−22.2%
2020	47,329		−12.2%

According to the 2020 census, the population of the CNMI was 47,329, down from 69,221 in 2000. The decrease was reportedly due to a combination of factors, including the demise of the garment industry (the vast majority of whose employees were females from China), economic crises, and a decline in tourism, one of the CNMI's primary sources of revenue.

As of the 2020 Census, except for the U.S. Minor Outlying Islands, the Northern Mariana Islands are the second least populous sub-federal jurisdiction in the United States, next to American Samoa. However, the islands population has fluctuated over time hitting 80 thousand in 2000, then declining to around 50 thousand in the 2010s. In 1986, when the people of the CNMI became U.S. citizens, it had a population of about 36 thousand. In 1950, the population was about 7 thousand. For comparison, in 1776, the smallest American state by population was Delaware with a population of about 60 thousand.

As of 2020, about 60% of the population are U.S. Citizens or Lawful Permanent Residents, and the other 40% are foreign workers. The United States has a program that monitors the ratio of workers to citizens and the number of lawful residents of different types.

Many Marianans have migrated to the continental US, and moving to the West Coast is slightly more popular. One of the largest communities is in Washington State, with a community of almost 5,000 people from the islands.

=== Languages ===
The official languages on the Northern Mariana Islands include English, Chamorro, and Carolinian. Few people still speak the nearly extinct Tanapag language. Many Philippine languages, Chinese, and other Pacific island languages are also spoken. Spanish is still retained in surnames but is no longer commonly used, though it is still familiar to some elders as a third or fourth language and to some Spanish language students.

=== Ethnic groups ===
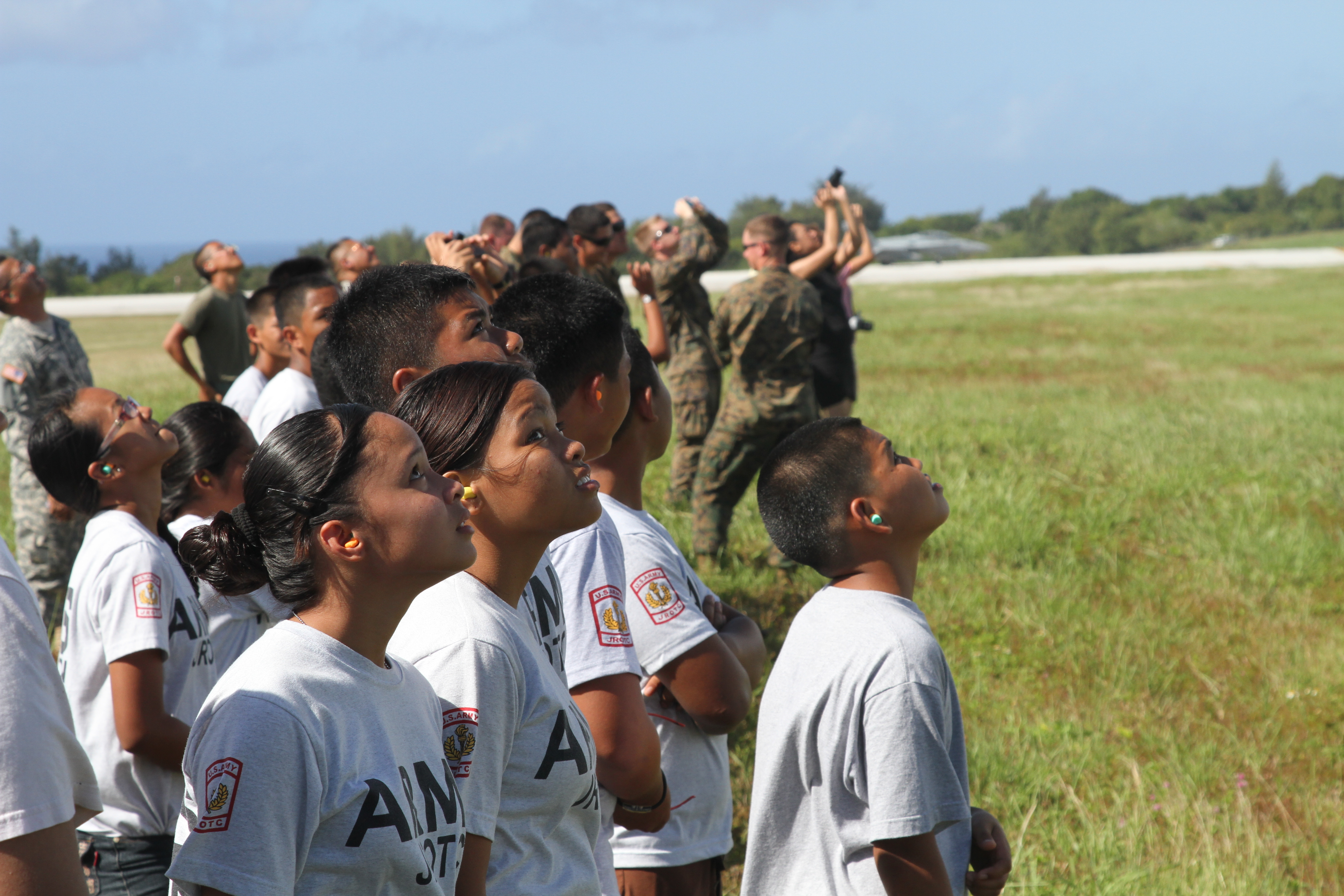
Northern Marianas students on Tinian in 2012

Based on the 2010 census in the CIA World Factbook:

The Northern Marianas is mostly a diverse mix of Asian and Pacific peoples.

- Filipino 35.3%
- Chamorro 23.9%
- Multiracial 12.7% (2 or more backgrounds)
- Chinese 6.8%
- Other Hawaiian or Pacific Islander 6.4%
- Carolinian 4.6%
- Korean 4.2%
- Other Asian 3.7%
- Other 2.5%

=== Religion ===
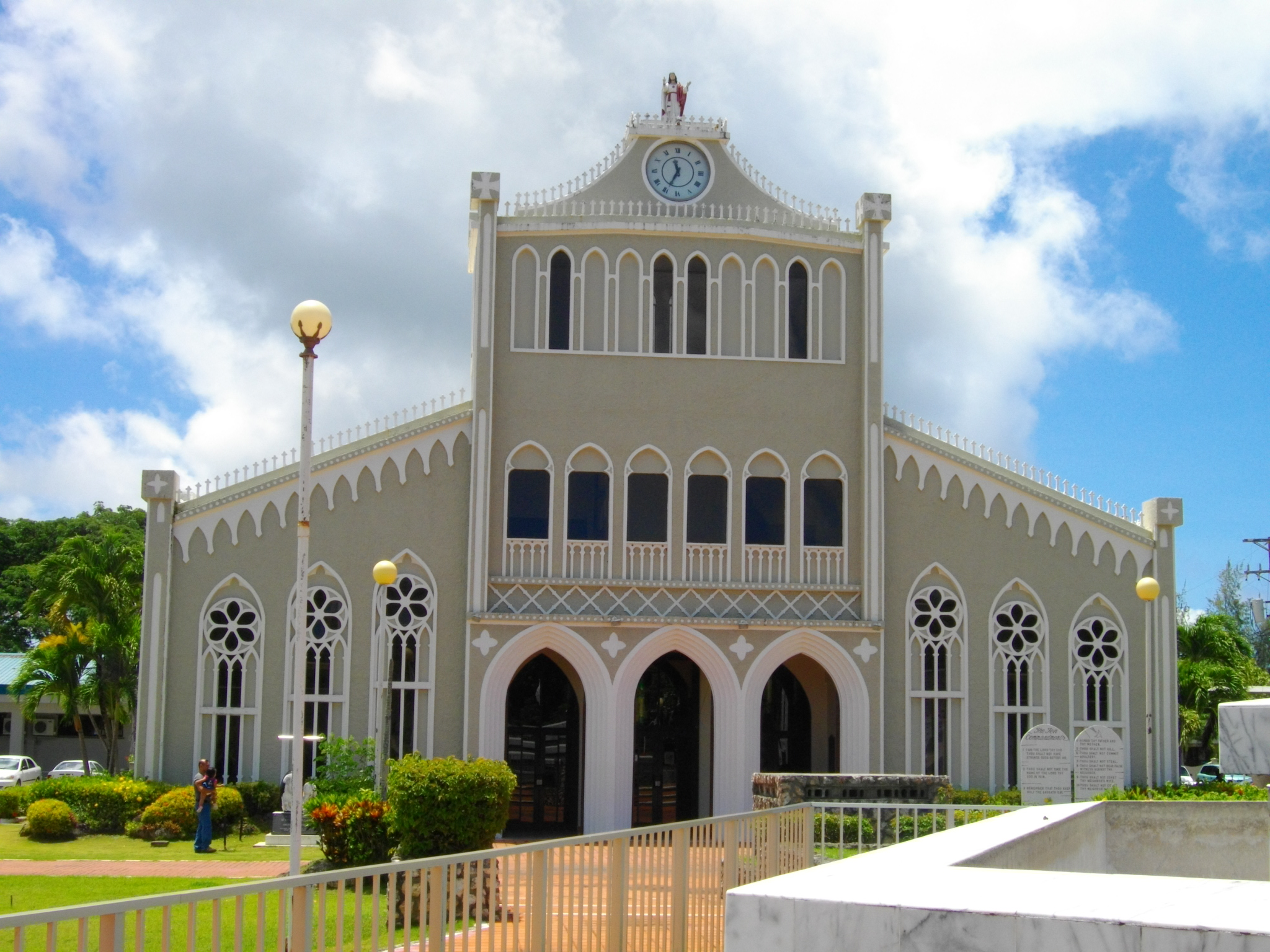
Our Lady of Mount Carmel Cathedral, Chalan Kanoa

Owing to the Spanish missionaries in the Marianas, a large majority of Chamorros and Carolinians practice Roman Catholicism. The Japanese occupation created a sizable Buddhist community which remained after the Japanese withdrawal. Due to the influence of the United States, diverse denominations of Protestantism also entered the islands. Many people on the Northern Mariana Islands have traditional beliefs.

According to the Pew Research Center, 2010:

- Roman Catholic 64.1%
- Protestants 16%
- Buddhists 10.6%
- Folk religions 5.3%
- Other Christians 1.2%
- Other religions 1.1%
- Unaffiliated 1.0%
- Eastern Orthodox <1%
- Hindu <1%
- Muslim <1%
- Jews <1%

The Church of Jesus Christ of Latter-day Saints reported 865 members in a ward (congregation) in the Northern Mariana Islands.

=== Education ===
The Commonwealth of the Northern Mariana Islands Public School System operates public schools in the commonwealth and there are numerous private schools. Northern Marianas College is accredited by the Western Association of Schools and Colleges and offers a range of programs similar to other small U.S. community colleges.

== Culture ==
=== Cinema ===
A small independent cinema of Northern Mariana Islands, producing mostly documentary films, developed in the 21st century thanks to the efforts of the Commonwealth and of the Northern Marianas College. Foreign producers had already shot films on the islands in the 20th century.

In 2002, a new § 2151 of the Commonwealth Code established within the Marianas Visitors Authority (MVA), a Commonwealth Film, Video, and Media Office, also known as the Northern Mariana Islands Film Office, with the purpose of attracting foreign companies to produce movies in the Commonwealth and to develop a local cinema industry.

=== Sports ===
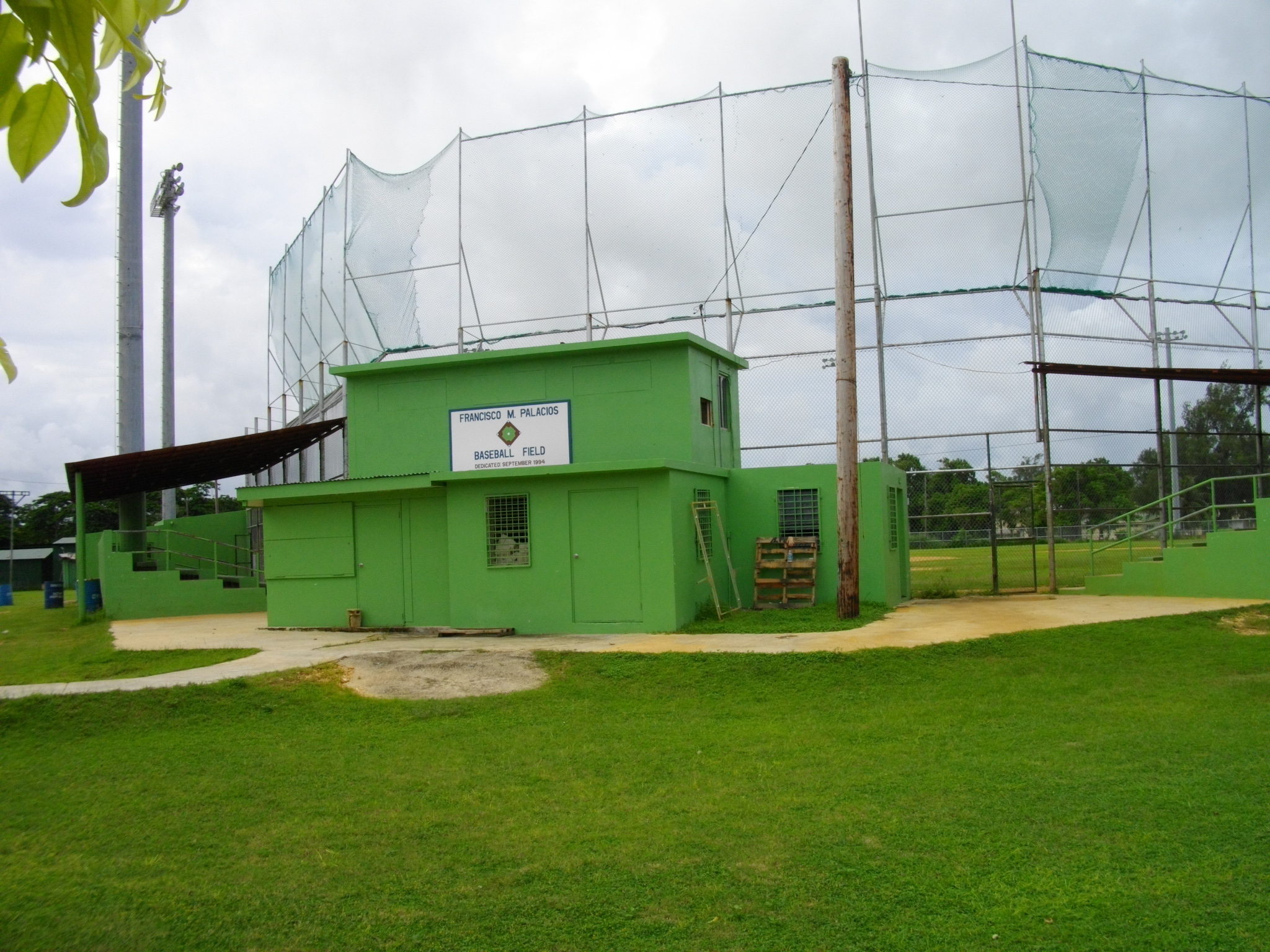
Francisco M. Palacios Baseball Field

Team sports prevalent in the United States were introduced to the Northern Mariana Islands by American soldiers during World War II. Baseball is the islands' most popular sport. CNMI teams have made appearances in the Little League World Series (in the Little, Junior, Senior, and Big league divisions) as well as winning gold medals in the Micronesian Games and South Pacific Games.

Basketball and mixed martial arts are also popular in the islands, which hosted the official 2009 Oceania Basketball Tournament. Trench Wars is the CNMI's Mixed Martial Arts brand. Fighters from the CNMI have competed in the Pacific Xtreme Combat as well as the UFC.

Other sports in the CNMI include Ultimate Frisbee, volleyball, tennis, soccer, outrigger sailing, softball, beach volleyball, rugby, golf, boxing, kickboxing, tae kwon do, track and field, swimming, triathlon, and football.

The islands have several golf courses, mostly on Saipan and often near resorts. There are four golf courses on Saipan as of the 2020s: Marianas Country Club, Laolao Bay Country Club, Coral Ocean Point Resort Clu, and Kingfisher Golf Links. To the south, Rota Island has another Rota Resort & Country Club. All the courses have 18 holes, but the level of difficulty varies.

== Flora and fauna ==
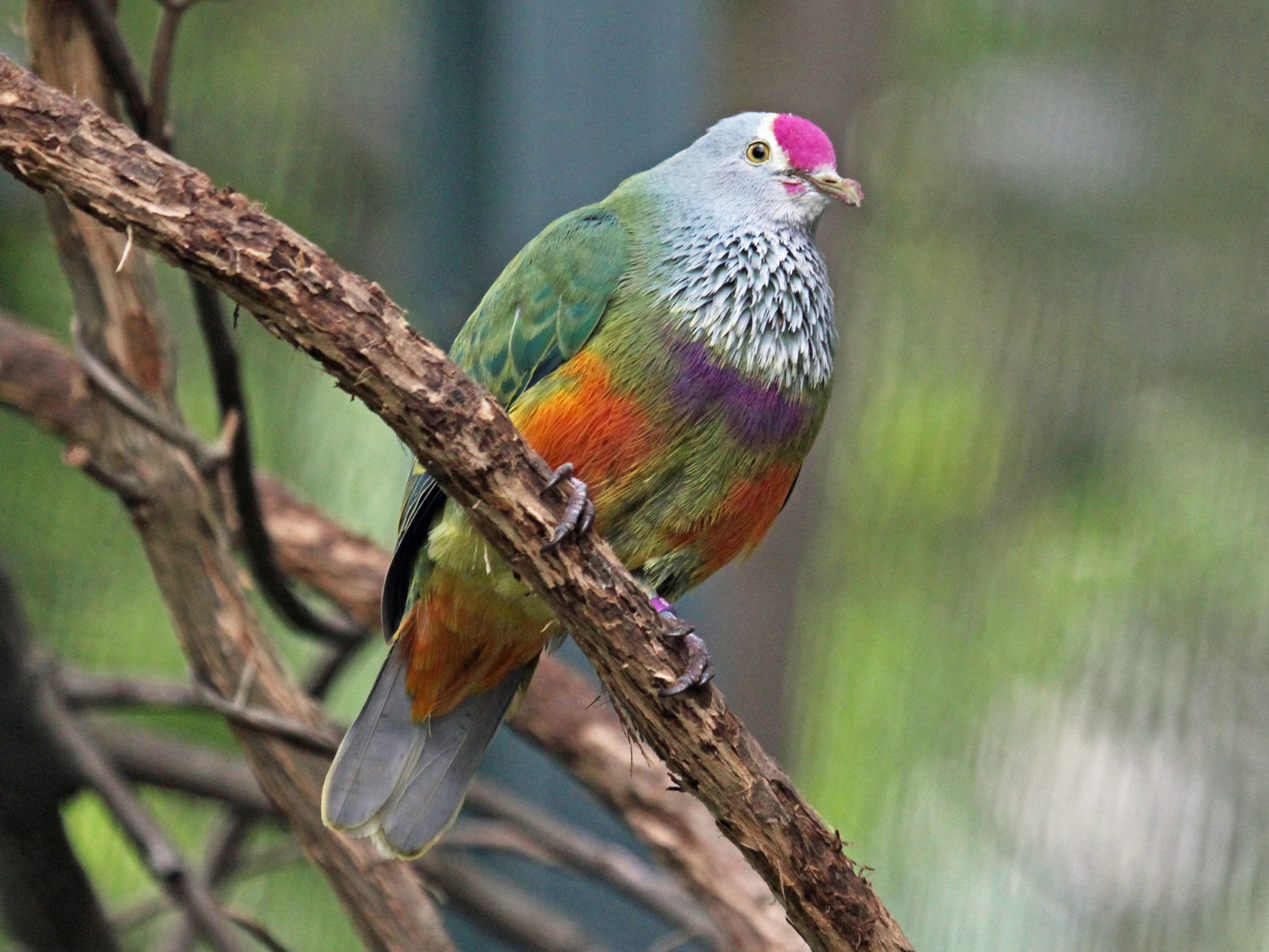
Mariana fruit dove

The official bird of the Northern Marianas Islands is the endemic Mariana fruit dove and the official flower is the Plumeria, which originated in the Americas. The islands are home to many tropical plants and animals, as well as marine life such as whales and dugongs. The islands are heavily forested, with about 80% ground cover consisting of tropical forests. Trees include palm, banana, pine, fern, and plumeria. There are many species of coral around the islands, many of which are ringed by coral reefs, and some islands have upwards of 60 species of coral.

There are nine known species of birds endemic to the Northern Marianas, such as the Saipan Reed Warbler and Golden white-eye, as well as a variety of invertebrates, insects, and plants. Examples include Langford's tree snail (Partula langfordi) or the tree fern (Cyathea aramaganensis).

== See also ==
- An Act to amend Public Law 93-435 with respect to the Northern Mariana Islands
- Outline of the Northern Mariana Islands
- Index of Northern Mariana Islands-related articles
- List of National Register of Historic Places in the Northern Mariana Islands
- Vehicle registration plates of the Northern Mariana Islands
