= United Nations Security Council Resolution 683 =

UN Security Council Resolution 683
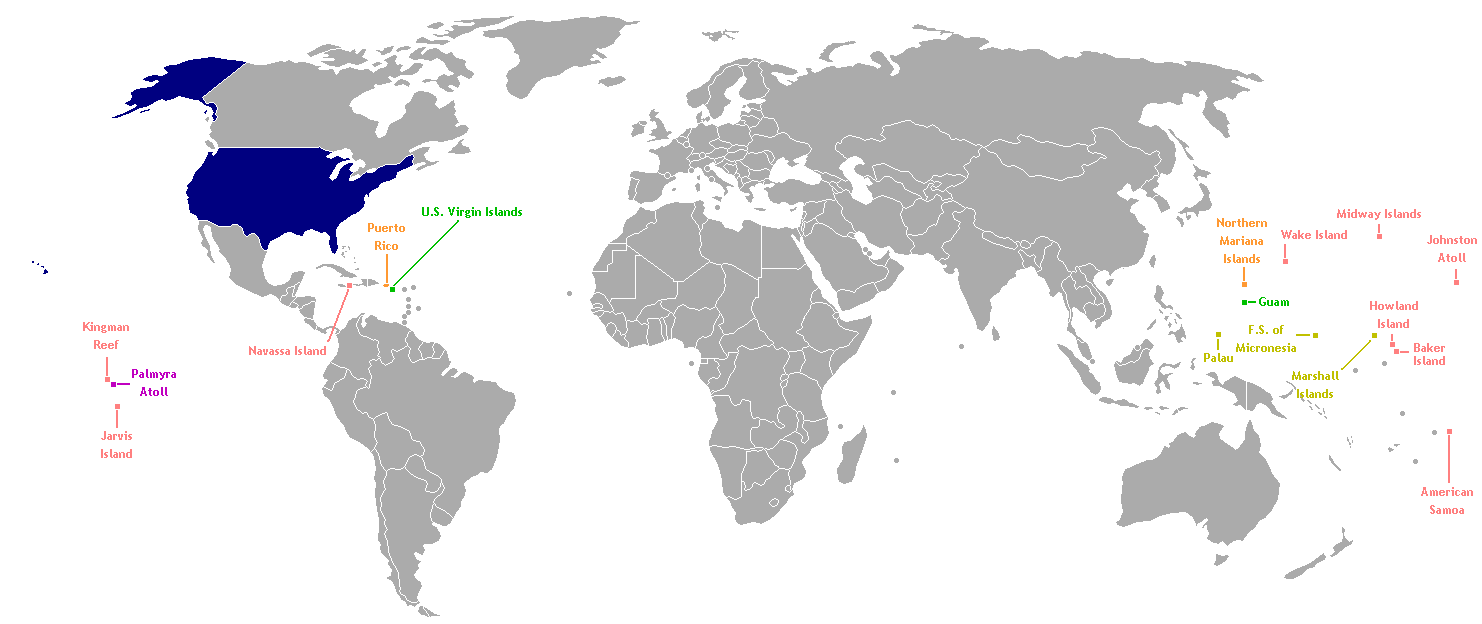
- United States insular areas and freely associated states
- Date: 22 December 1990
- Meeting no.: 2,972
- Code: S/RES/683 (Document)
- Subject: Pacific Islands (Trust Territory)
- Voting summary: 14 voted for; 1 voted against; None abstained
- Result: Adopted

Security Council composition
- Permanent members: China; France; Soviet Union; United Kingdom; United States
- Non-permanent members: Canada; Colombia; Ivory Coast; Cuba; Ethiopia; Finland; Malaysia; Romania; Yemen; Zaire

United Nations Security Council resolution 683, adopted on 22 December 1990, after recalling Resolution 21 (1947) which approved the Trusteeship Territory of the Japanese Mandated Islands (since known as the Trust Territory of the Pacific Islands) as well as Chapter XII of the United Nations Charter which established the United Nations Trusteeship system, the council determined that, in the light of entry into force of new status agreements for the Federated States of Micronesia, the Marshall Islands and the Northern Mariana Islands, the objectives of the Trusteeship Agreement had been completed and therefore ended the Trusteeship Agreement with those entities.

The council also hoped that the people of Palau, which had not yet completed the negotiations, would be freely able to exercise their right to self-determination, as the above-mentioned states already had. At the same time, the council welcomed the Administering Authority's assurance that it would assist the Government of Palau in attaining its final status in determining its future direction.

Resolution 683 was adopted by 14 votes in favour, with Cuba voting against the resolution, stating it had felt the council had not properly discharged its responsibilities. The Cuban representative said that it should have given the people of the territories concerned an opportunity to explain their reasons for not wanting the council to take the action it had taken.

== See also ==
- Compact of Free Association
- List of United Nations Security Council Resolutions 601 to 700 (1987–1991)
- United Nations Trust Territories
