= Mount Agrihan =

Volcano in Northern Mariana Islands

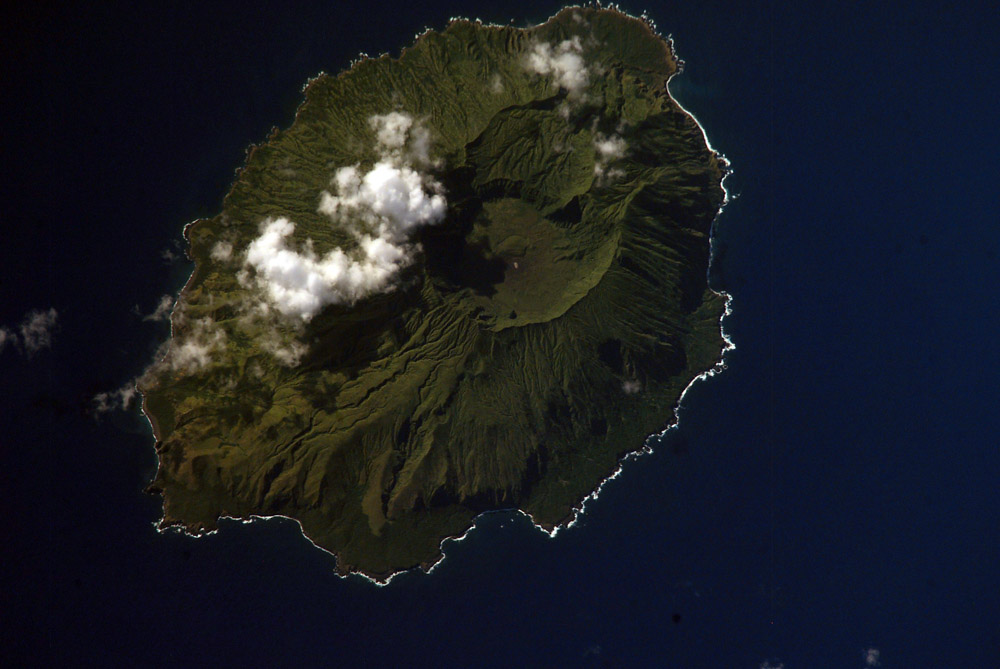
- NASA Space Shuttle image of Agrihan

Highest point
- Elevation: 3,166 ft (965 m)
- Prominence: 3,166 ft (965 m)
- Coordinates: 18.77°N 145.67°E

Geography
- Location: Northern Mariana Islands, United States

Geology
- Mountain type: Stratovolcano
- Last eruption: 1917

Climbing
- First ascent: 2018; organized by John D. Mitchler and Reid Larson

Mount Agrihan is a stratovolcano on the formerly uninhabited island of Agrihan in the Pacific Ocean, located in the Northern Mariana Islands, an insular area and commonwealth of the United States. The volcano has an elevation of 3,166 feet (965 m), making its summit the highest point in the Northern Mariana Islands, as well as all of Micronesia.

== History ==
The volcano's last known eruption was in 1917.

An expedition organized by John D. Mitchler and Reid Larson made the first complete ascent to the summit of this peak on June 1, 2018.
