= 1958 Saipan integration referendum =

Ballot measure in Saipan

An unofficial referendum on integration of Northern Marianas with Guam was held in Saipan in June 1958. Though the proposal was approved by nearly 64% of voters and the Guam Legislature adopted Resolution No. 367 requesting the US Congress to integrate the governments, the United States did not integrate the islands.

== Background ==
Saipan had been administratively separated from Guam since 1898, when the latter had come under American control. Saipan also came under American control in 1947. In 1957, the Popular Party had victories in Guam and Northern Marianas. An unofficial poll on reunification was conducted, with 63.8% of Saipan's voters in favor of integration.

== Results ==
Choice	Votes	%
For		63.8
Against		36.2
Invalid/blank votes		–
Total		100
Registered voters/turnout		
Source: Direct Democracy

== Aftermath ==
After the poll, Resolution No. 367 was passed by the Guam Legislature, asking the US Congress to integrate the Northern Marianas's government into Guam's. The Guam Legislature met with the Saipan Municipal Congress in early September 1959, and later that month, the Saipan Congress adopted Resolution No. 7, asking the United Nations to integrate the two governments. The requests were not implemented. Later referendums were held in 1961, 1963, and 1969.
