= 1961 Northern Mariana Islands status referendum =

Ballot measure in the Northern Mariana Islands

A referendum on the status of the Northern Mariana Islands was held on 5 February 1961. Although 65% of voters supported integration with Guam, the United States did not integrate the islands.

== Background ==
Saipan had been administratively separated from Guam since 1898, when the latter had come under American control. Saipan also came under American control in 1947. In 1957, the Popular Party had victories in Guam and Northern Marianas. In 1958, an unofficial poll in Saipan had been in favor of integration and the Guam Legislature had asked the US Congress to integrate the Northern Marianas's government into Guam's.

The 1961 referendum was organized by the local Parliament, as members wished to integrate with Guam. It was held prior to a March visit by a United Nations commission checking on the conditions of the UN trust territories. Rota was in a different district at the time, and could not vote.

== Results ==
Voters were given four options:

- [A] Do you desire to become United States citizens within the political framework of Guam?
- [B] Do you desire to become United States citizens by becoming a separate territory of the United States?
- [C] Do you desire to remain in the same status?
- [D] Other Wishes?

Choice	Votes	%
Integration with Guam	1,642	64.54
US territory	875	34.40
Status quo	27	1.06
Other status	0	0.00
Invalid/blank votes	8	–
Total	2,552	100
Registered voters/turnout	3,035	84.09
Source: Direct Democracy

== Aftermath ==
The Carolinian community held a poll opposed to integration. Both results were given to the UN mission upon its arrival, but neither affected the mission's stance that the area needed greater self-reliance. Later referendums were held in 1963 and 1969.
