= 1969 Guamanian unification with the Northern Mariana Islands referendum =

Guamanian ballot measure

4 November 1969
- Should all of the islands of the Marianas be politically reintegrated within the framework of the American territory of Guam, such new territory to be known as the Territory of the Marianas?

Results
Choice	Votes	%
Yes	2,688	41.95%
No	3,720	58.05%
Valid votes	6,408	98.46%
Invalid or blank votes	100	1.54%
Total votes	6,508	100.00%
Registered voters/turnout	19,650	33.12%

A referendum on union with the Northern Mariana Islands was held in Guam on 4 November 1969. The proposal was rejected by 58% of voters due to fears about an increase in taxation. Despite the result, a similar referendum was held in the Northern Mariana Islands on 9 November in which 61% of voters supported union with Guam.

== Results ==
Should all of the islands of the Marianas be politically reintegrated within the framework of the American territory of Guam, such new territory to be known as the Territory of the Marianas?

Choice	Votes	%
For	2,688	41.95
Against	3,720	58.05
Total	6,408	100.00
Valid votes	6,408	98.46
Invalid/blank votes	100	1.54
Total votes	6,508	100.00
Registered voters/turnout	19,650	33.12
Source: Direct Democracy
