= 1963 Northern Mariana Islands integration referendum =

Ballot measure in the Northern Mariana Islands

An unofficial referendum on integration with Guam was held in the Northern Mariana Islands on 27 October 1963. Although the proposal was approved by voters, the islands were not integrated.

== Background ==
Previous referendums in 1958 and 1961 had been in favor of integration. Both the Guam Legislature and Saipan Congress had passed resolutions requesting reunification. The 1963 referendum was organized by the local Parliament as members wanted the islands to integrate with Guam, and was timed to coincide with the 1964 visit of a United Nations commission looking at the status of the UN Trust Territories.

== Results ==
Choice	Votes	%
Integration with Guam	1,231	96.78
Remain a territory	32	2.52
Independence	9	0.71
Total	1,272	100.00
Valid votes	1,272	98.91
Invalid/blank votes	14	1.09
Total votes	1,286	100.00
Registered voters/turnout	3,015	42.65
Source: Direct Democracy

== Aftermath ==
The results were presented to the mission, with the mission's report responding that secession from a UN Trust Territory was not possible "and should be regarded as firmly settled".
