= Santa tracker =

Santa tracker may refer to:

- Google Santa Tracker
- NORAD Tracks Santa
