= Wygant =

Wygant is a surname. Notable people with the surname include:

- Bobbie Wygant (1926–2024), American television news reporter, film critic, talk show host, and interviewer
- Michael G. Wygant (born 1936), American diplomat

== See also ==
- Wygant State Natural Area, a state park in Oregon, US
- Wygant v. Jackson Board of Education, United States Supreme Court case
