= Micronesia–United States relations =

Federated States of Micronesia–United States relations

- Federated States of Micronesia: United States

Federated States of Micronesia–United States relations are bilateral relations between the Federated States of Micronesia and the United States of America.

== History ==
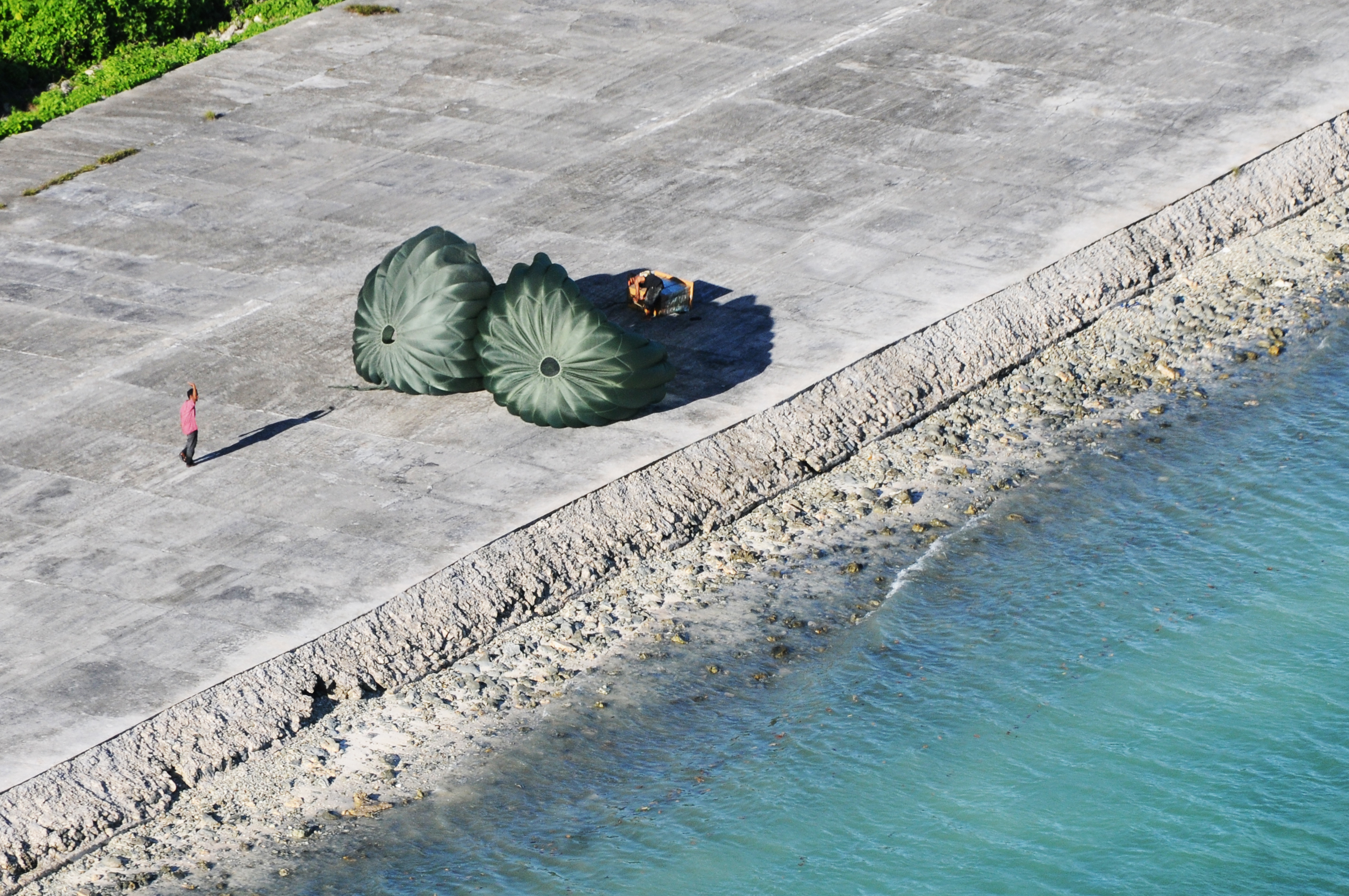
A resident of Mokil Atoll waves to the C-130 crew after receiving an air dropped US aid package during the annual Operation Christmas Drop, 2012.

There is a U.S. Embassy in Kolonia, Pohnpei, Federated States of Micronesia with a resident Ambassador to Micronesia.

Over 25 U.S. federal agencies continue to maintain programs in the FSM. Under the Amended Compact, the U.S. has full authority and responsibility for the defense of the FSM. This security relationship can be changed or terminated by mutual agreement. Also under the Compact, Micronesians can live, work, and study in the United States without a visa. Micronesians volunteer to serve in the U.S. Armed Forces at approximately double the per capita rate as Americans. Americans can live and work freely in the FSM without the need for a visa.

The U.S. will provide about $100 million annually in assistance to the FSM over the next 20 years. A Joint Economic Management Committee (JEMCO) consisting of representatives of both nations is responsible for ensuring that assistance funds are spent effectively, with the aim of fostering good governance and economic self-reliance. The basic relationship of free association continues indefinitely.

The United States is the FSM's largest trade partner.

Because of this financial relationship, the island nation has been called a haven for U.S. military recruiters. This arrangement has been criticized because these Island Soldiers are not entitled to the same benefits as soldiers who are U.S. citizens; and neither they nor their families are allowed to vote.

Principal U.S. Officials include Ambassador Jennifer L. Johnson

== Diplomatic missions ==
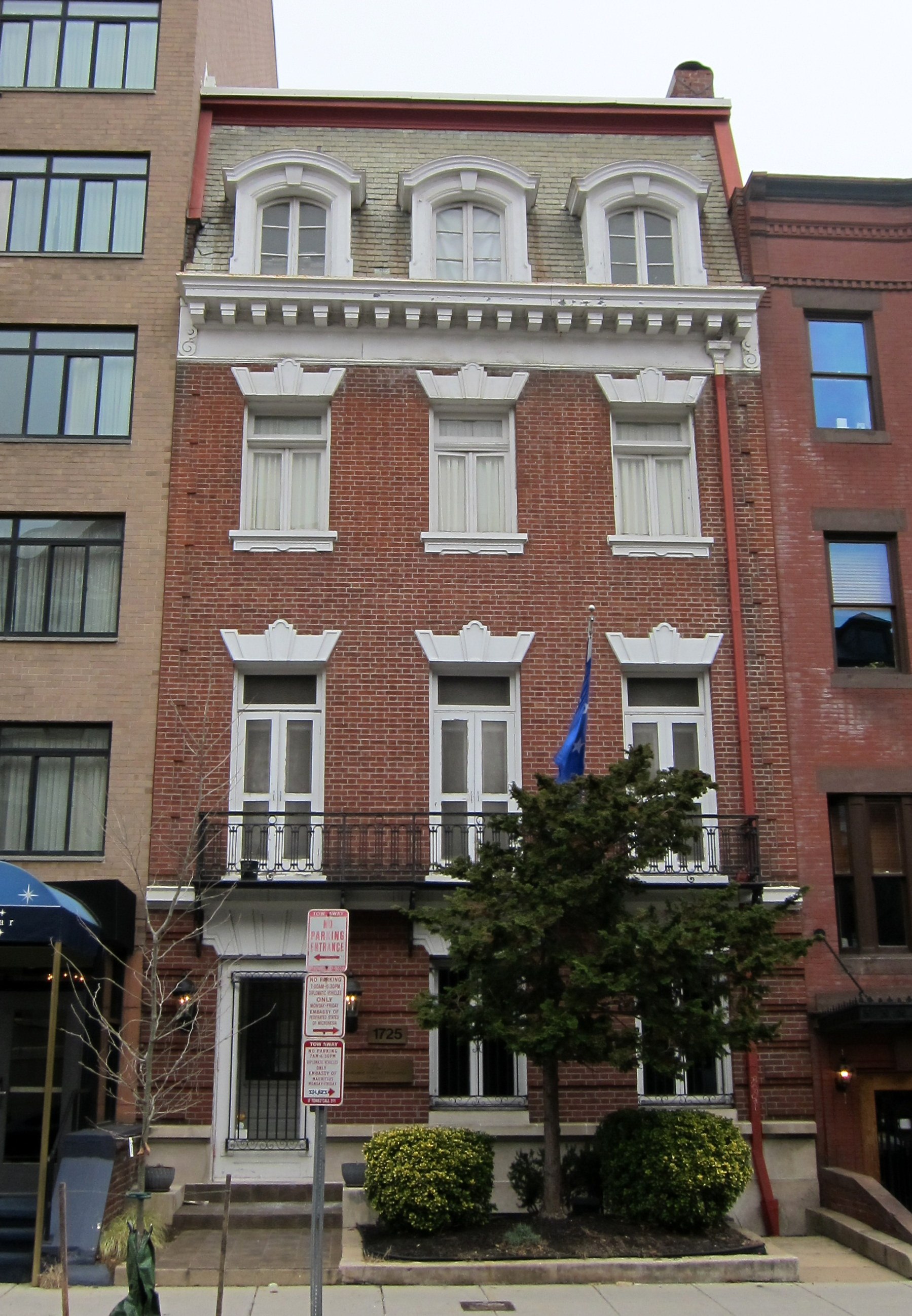
Embassy of the Federated States of Micronesia in Washington, D.C.

- Federated States of Micronesia has an embassy in Washington, D.C. and maintains consulates in Honolulu, Portland and in Tamuning (Guam).
- United States has an embassy in Kolonia.

== See also ==
- Foreign relations of the Federated States of Micronesia
- Island Soldier (documentary film)
