= Pagan (island) =

Island of the Northern Mariana Islands

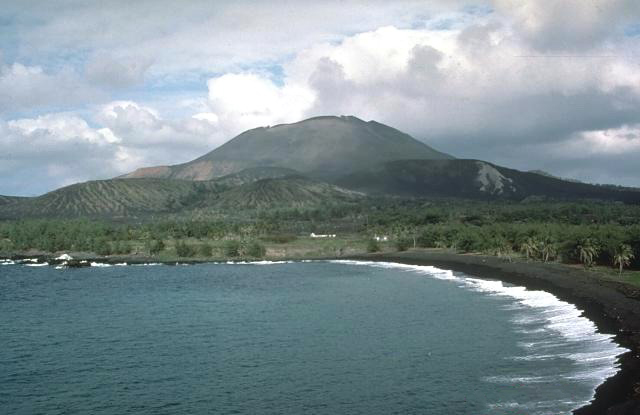
- Mount Pagan, the most active of the two stratovolcanoes on Pagan Island in 1983

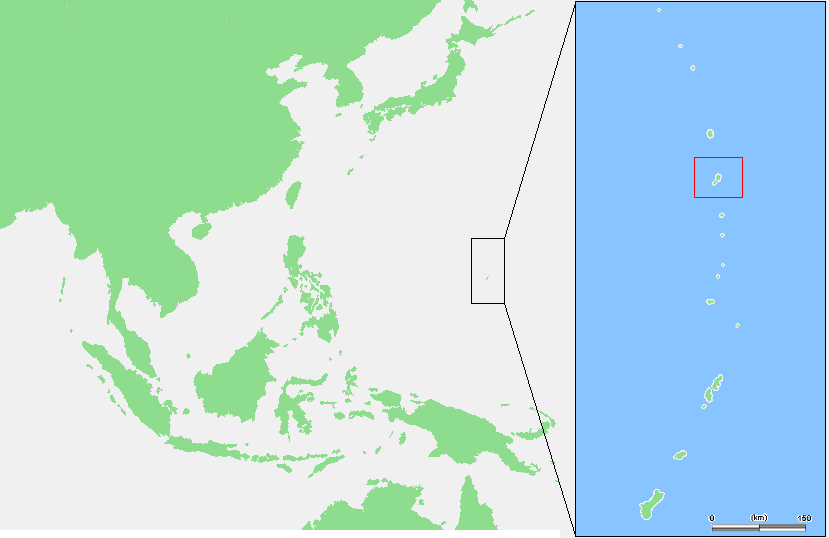

Geography
- Location: Pacific Ocean
- Coordinates: 18°7′N 145°46′E
- Archipelago: Northern Mariana Islands
- Area: 47 km^{2} (18 sq mi)
- Length: 16.2 km (10.07 mi)
- Width: 6.0 km (3.73 mi)
- Highest elevation: 570 m (1870 ft)
- Highest point: Mount Pagan

Administration
- United States
- Commonwealth: Northern Mariana Islands

Demographics
- Population: 2 (2025)

Pagan is a volcanic island in the Marianas archipelago in the northwest Pacific Ocean, under the jurisdiction of the Commonwealth of the Northern Mariana Islands. It lies midway between Alamagan to the south and Agrihan to the north. The island has been largely uninhabited since the majority of the residents were evacuated due to volcanic eruptions in 1981.

The volcano on Pagan is monitored by the USGS, which issues weekly updates about volcanic activity. The island actually has two stratovolcanoes, one on the north and another in the south.

== History ==
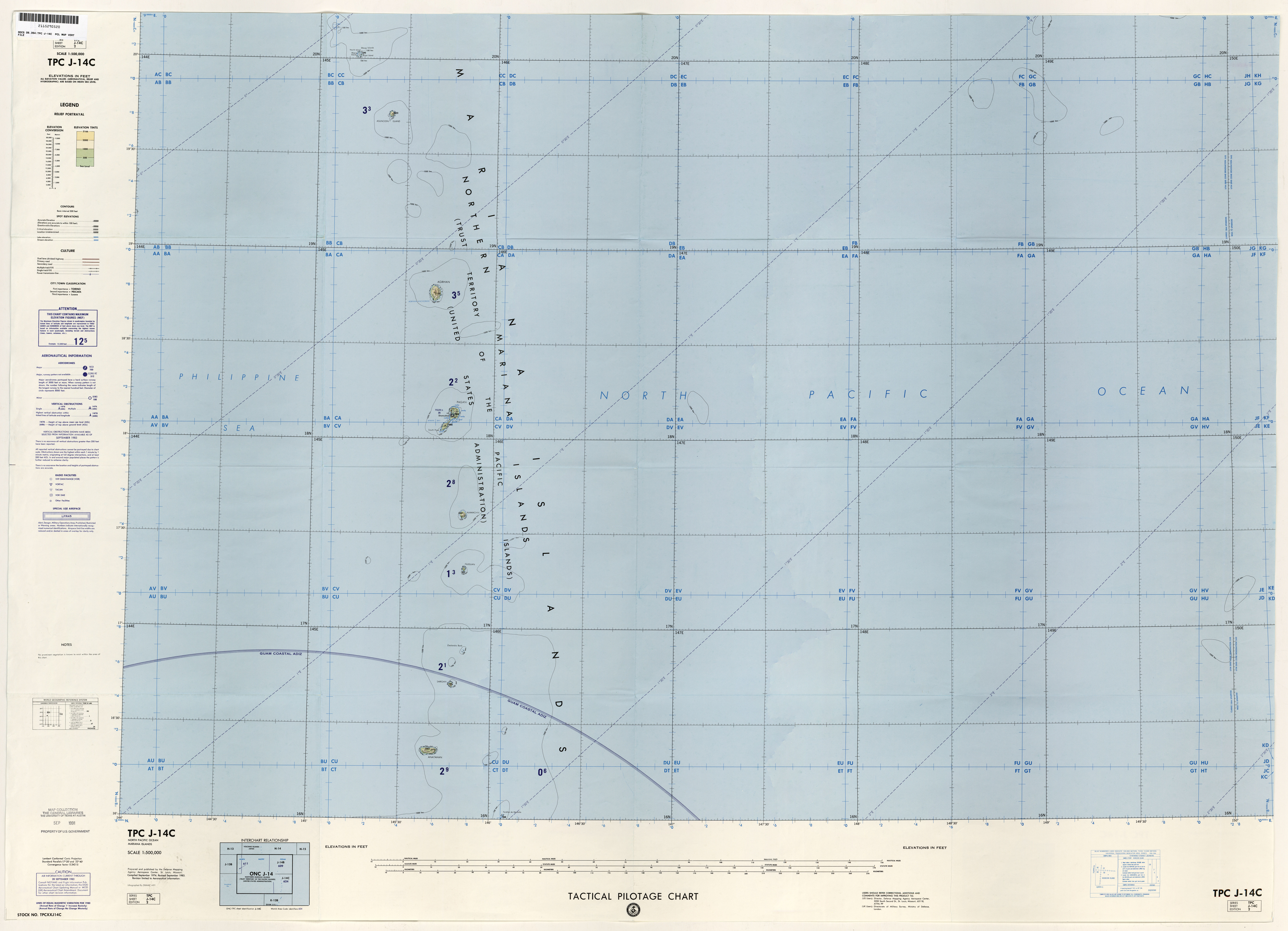
Map including Pagan (DMA, 1983)

Archaeological finds indicate that Pagan was settled from several centuries BC. The first European contact was in 1669, when the island was sighted by the Spanish missionary Diego Luis de San Vitores who named it San Ignacio (Saint Ignatius in Spanish). It is likely that it was previously visited in 1522 by the Spanish sailor Gonzalo de Vigo, deserter from the Magellan expedition in 1521, and the first European castaway in the history of the Pacific. The native Chamorro population was forcibly deported to Saipan in 1695, and then three years later to Guam. The Chamorros began to return to Pagan in the early 19th century, but found that the island had been colonized by freed Kanakas from the Caroline Islands. In the 1870s, the first coconut plantations were established.

After the sale of the Northern Mariana islands by Spain to the German Empire in 1899, the island was administered as part of the colony of German New Guinea. Together with Almagan, it was leased to a private company, the German-Japanese partnership the Pagan Society, which traded mainly copra. The island was devastated by typhoons in July and September 1905, September 1907, and December 1913, which destroyed the coconut plantations and bankrupted the Pagan Society.

In 1914, during World War I, the island was captured by the Empire of Japan, which was awarded control by the League of Nations as part of the South Seas Mandate. The island was settled by ethnic Japanese and Okinawans, who restored the coconut plantations and raised cotton and sweet potatoes for export. In addition, the Japanese developed commercial fishing for bonito and tuna. An airfield, Pagan Airstrip, was constructed in 1935, and the Imperial Japanese Navy established a garrison in 1937. By 1942 the Japanese civilian population was 413 persons with an additional 229 Chamorro residents. In June 1944 a garrison force of 2,150 men of the Imperial Japanese Army arrived, only to be cut off and isolated by the ongoing Allied offensive. Receiving supplies only occasionally by submarine, the garrison soon faced starvation, and several hundred died of malnutrition before the surrender of Japan.

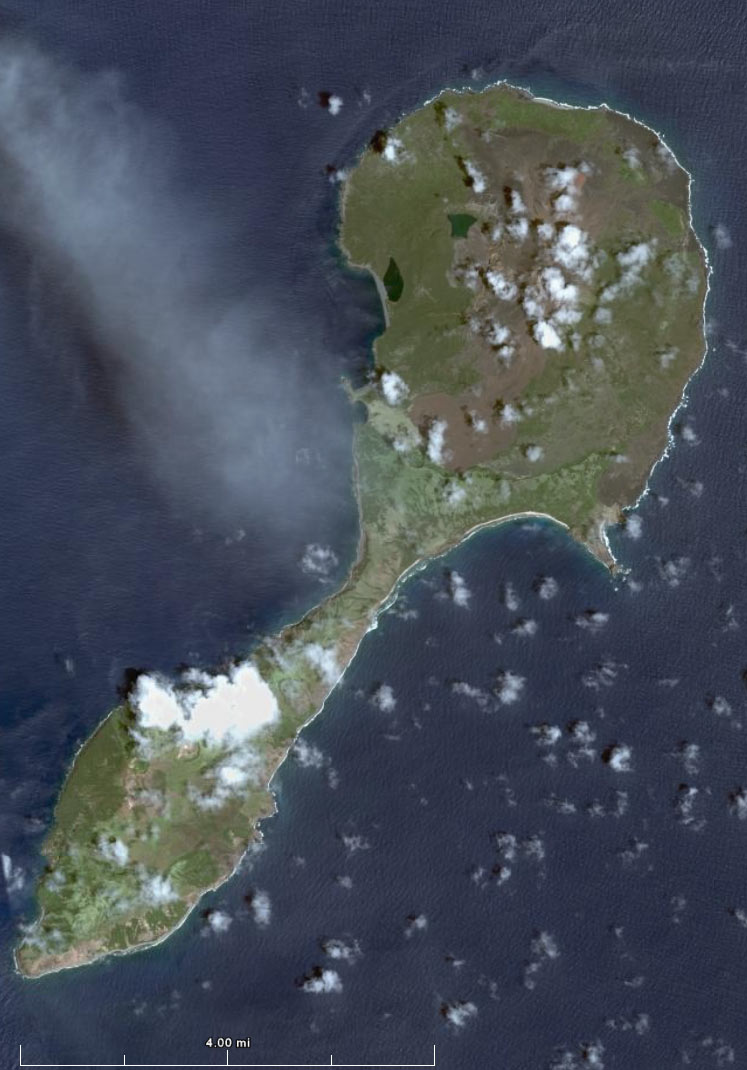
Landsat view of Pagan

After World War II, Pagan was occupied by the United States as part of the UN Trust Territory of the Pacific Islands. The US Navy maintained a small establishment on Pagan and during the 1950s built public institutions, including a church, a copra warehouse, an infirmary and a school house. However the civilian population was under 100 people by the end of the 1970s, many of whom were seasonally present from Saipan.

On May 15, 1981, Mount Pagan erupted, with lava flows covering a large part of the island's arable land and part of the airfield runway; the island's inhabitants were evacuated to Saipan. The eruption continued until 1985, with further small eruptions in 1987, 1988, 1992, 1993, 1996, 2006, 2009, 2010, 2012 and 2021. Repeated petitions by the islanders to return have been rejected by US authorities, due to the continuing threat posed by the volcano. Efforts are underway by the Northern Islands Mayor's Office and concerned citizens to assist the approximately 300 displaced residents of the Northern Islands who wish to return and resettle in Anatahan, Alamagan, Pagan and Agrihan.

On November 4, 1986, the Northern Marianas including Pagan became a part of the United States, and the people of Pagan U.S. Citizens.

Pagan Island was included during Operation Christmas Drop 2006. United States Air Force C-130 aircrew observed cattle and a small cluster of buildings, including a grass airstrip, located on the island.

Plans by a Japanese investor group to use Pagan as a dumping ground for debris and rubble from the 2011 Tōhoku earthquake and tsunami in Japan were provisionally shelved after protests in June 2012.

Politically, Pagan remains part of the Northern Islands Municipality.

In 2021, 14 residents of Pagan were evacuated due to volcanic activity.

== Eruptions and activity ==
After many years of dormancy Pagan volcano erupted between May 1981 and 1985. Thereafter it had eruptions in 1987, 1988, 1992, 1993, 1996, 2006, 2009, 2010, 2011, 2012, and 2021. Although it may have erupted in 1930, the last confirmed eruption prior to the 1980s was in 1925, and before that 1923, 1917, and 1909. In the 19th century it erupted in the 1870s, 1864, and 1820s. Other suspected eruptions include around 1800, 1669, and sometime between 1240 and 1440.

== Geography ==
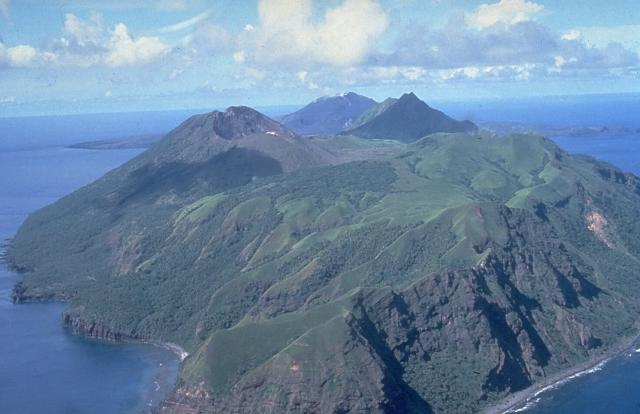
South Pagan volcano occupies the SW end of Pagan Island. The ridge in the right foreground is the eroded rim of a 4-km-wide caldera inside which the conical South Pagan volcano (left) was constructed. The elongated summit of South Pagan is cut by four craters. Eruptions of South Pagan volcano occurred during the 19th century, but it has been much less active than North Pagan volcano, the peak at the far center on the NE tip of the island.

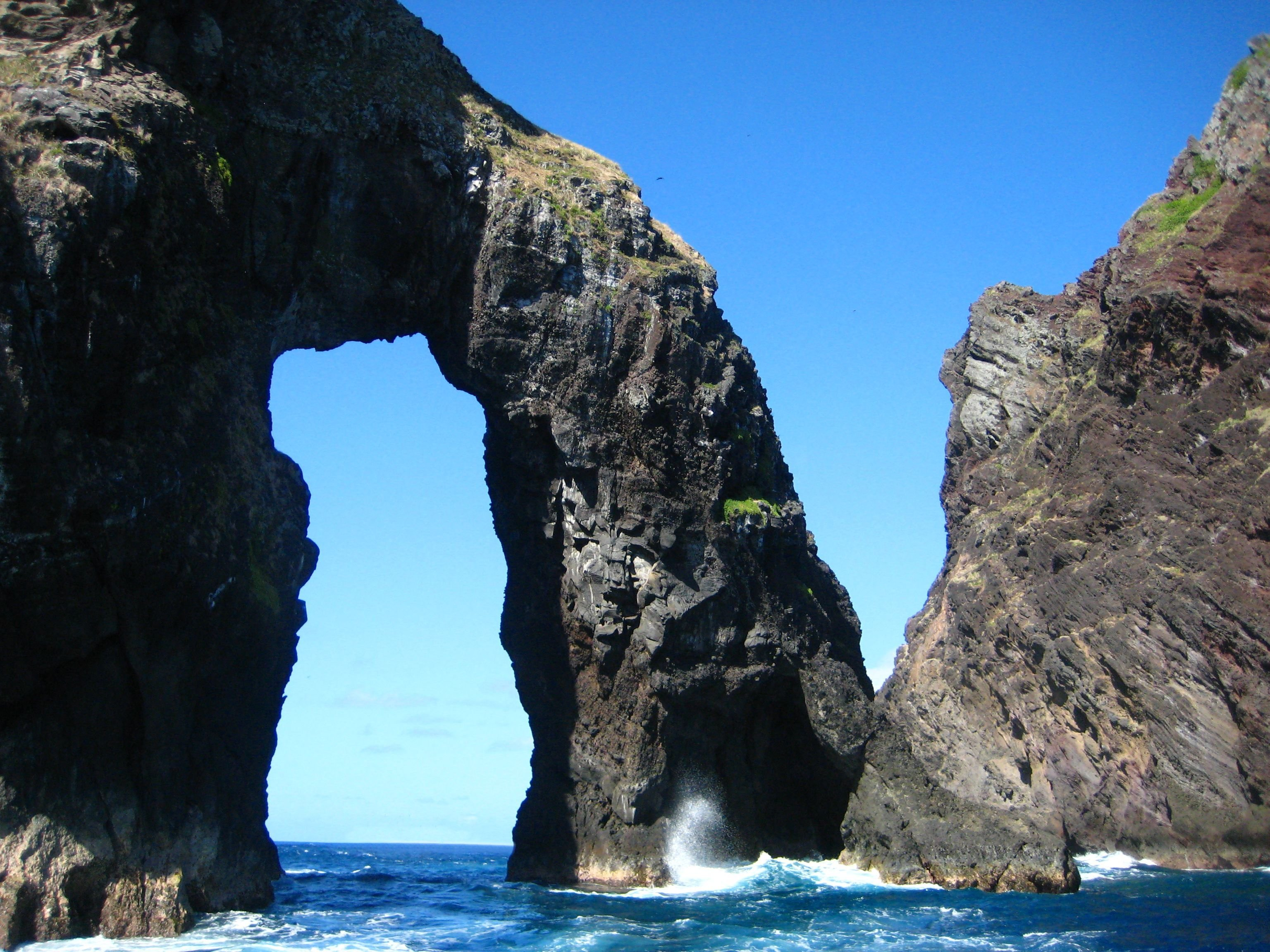
Natural arch

Pagan is located about 320 kilometers (200 mi) north of Saipan, the most populous of the Northern Mariana Islands. With an area of 47.23 km^{2} (18.24 sq mi), it is the fourth largest island of the Northern Marianas.

The island is a double island consisting of two stratovolcanoes joined by a narrow strip of land with a width of only 600 meters (660 yd). The southern volcano (18.075°N 145.725°E), is 548 m (1,798 ft) high with a caldera approximately 4 km (2.5 mi) in diameter, consisting of four joined craters. Although several fumaroles were active in 1992, the southern volcano last erupted in 1864. The northern volcano, also known as Mount Pagan (18.13°N 145.8°E) has a height of 570 m (1,870 ft). The volcano is in the center of a caldera with a diameter of approximately 6 km (3.7 mi), and eruptions have been documented in the 1820s, 1872–1873, 1925 and 1981–85.

Pagan has two large lakes. Laguna Sanhalom (also Inner Lake) had an area of 17 hectares (42 acres) and depth of 23 m (75 ft) in the 1970s. Laguna Sanhiyon (also Laguna Lake) on the west coast of the northern island had an area of 16 hectares (40 acres) and depth of 20 m (66 ft). Both lakes contain brackish water.

Immediately off the northern east coast are the very small and steep rock islets Togari Rock (0.6 hectares (1.5 acres), 94 metres (308 ft) high) and Hira Rock (0.25 hectares (0.62 acres)), which are listed as separate islands among those islands constituting the Northern Islands Municipality.

== Demographics ==
As of the 1980s, Pagan’s population fluctuated seasonally, with some residents maintaining households on both Pagan and Saipan. In October 1977, seven families totaling 37 individuals were reported, with the number rising to 51 by December of that year. By 1980, nine families comprising 85 individuals were recorded, although many were not full-time residents.

Following the major volcanic eruption of May 1981, the entire population was evacuated, and the island has remained only sporadically inhabited since. The 2010 U.S. Census recorded no permanent residents on Pagan. However, the 2020 U.S. Census documented 2 individuals residing on the island.

In July 2021, during a period of increased volcanic activity, 14 residents were temporarily evacuated, indicating a limited and unofficial resettlement by some former inhabitants or seasonal occupants.

Despite its volatile geological nature, Pagan continues to hold cultural and ancestral significance for many Northern Islanders, particularly families from Saipan who view it as their homeland. As of the mid-2020s, various efforts have persisted to support organized resettlement, although permanent habitation remains limited and subject to volcanic risk assessments.

== Education ==
Previously Commonwealth of the Northern Mariana Islands Public School System operated an elementary school (until grade 6) on Pagan prior to the 1981 eruptions. In 1977 the school had 13 students. Students from Pagan attending secondary school did so on Saipan.

== Military live-fire training range plans ==
In 2013 the US Naval Command filed a proposal to obtain the island for a new group of live-fire and maneuver Ranges and Training Areas (RTAs).

The proposal spawned an online community called Our Islands are Sacred, a petition on Change.org, and rallies against it held by the Sierra Club, Save Pagan Island, Roots Action and Care2Make a Difference.

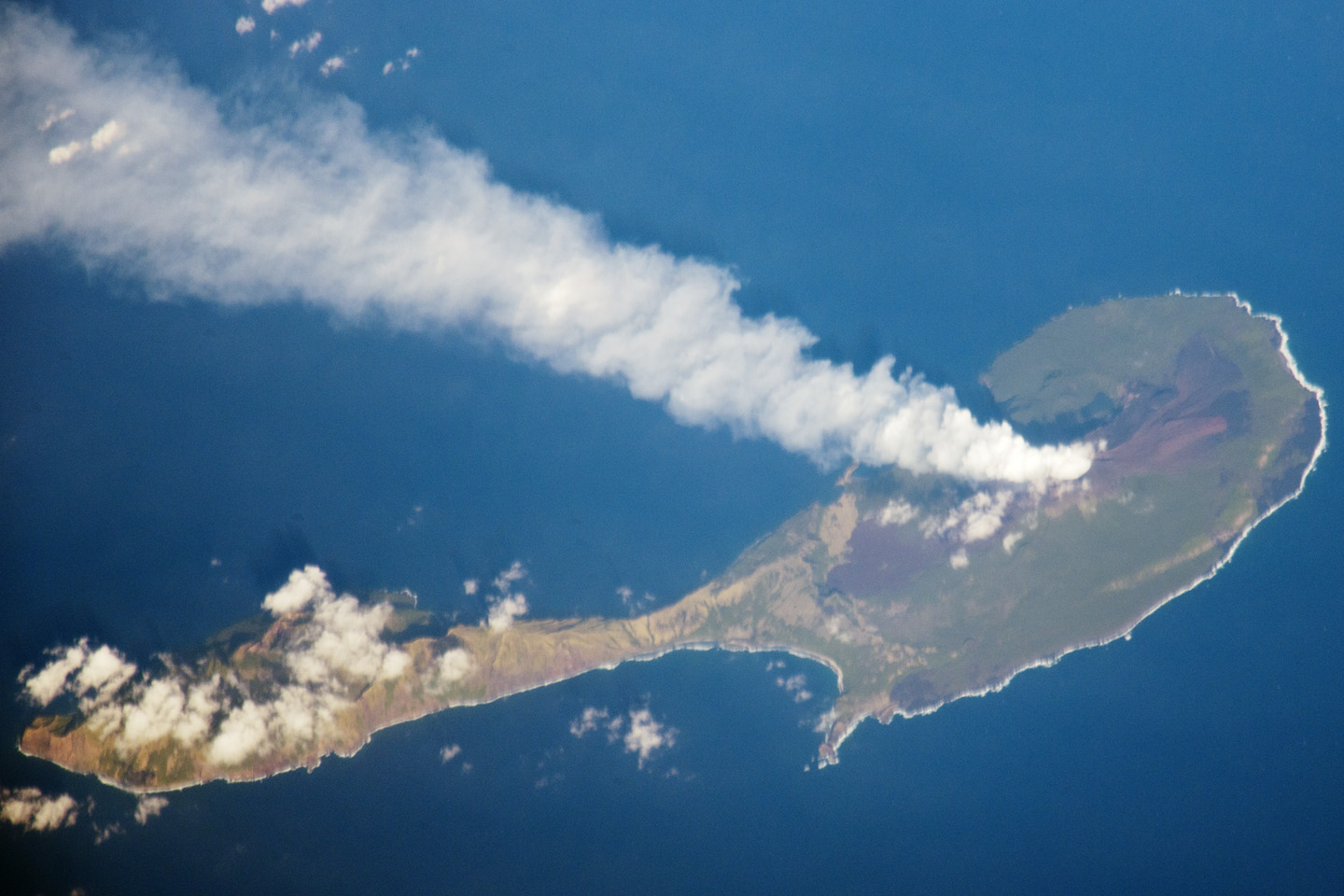
Pagan island, March 2012

On April 3, 2015 (HST) the Department of Defense (DoD) released a long-awaited draft of the Environmental Impact Statement (EIS). According to Michael G. Hadfield, a professor of biology at the University of Hawaiʻi at Mānoa who led an insect survey team to Pagan in 2010, "Speaking as a biologist, it's got some really unique things about it. ... It's not a wasteland, which I think some people envision because it's got an active volcano. There's a lot there that's worth preserving — a couple of endangered bird species and snail species — which I specialize in and is about to hit the U.S. endangered species list."

Jerome Aldan (died in February 2017), the mayor for CNMI's Northern Islands, which includes Pagan, told a New Zealand radio program that the U.S. military's description of the island as "uninhabited" was false. According to an article by James Cave for the Huffington Post, an article which used Hadfield as its source:

"More than 50 families in Saipan consider Pagan their home island and have plans and desires to return to homesteads," The island is occupied by two people, who live in shacks and have one flushing toilet and plumbing, electricity and small ranch.

According to an April 17, 2015, article by Wyatt Olson for Stars and Stripes military news network, "the [legislature of the Northern Mariana Islands] is considering a joint resolution calling on the governor to oppose the military expansion on the 10-mile-long island. ... In wording that hints at the hornet's nest the U.S. may have stirred with the proposal, the joint resolution asserts that "throughout the CNMI's history, foreign powers and outside influences have made major decisions and have dictated the course of development" for the region and that the U.S. "once again stands poised to make some very important decisions with respect to the military utilization of the Northern Islands." "

On May 15, 2015, a map of the proposed site was made available online.

On July 31, 2026, the Navy announced that plans for a training range on Pagan would not go forward.

== See also ==
- Pascal Horst Lehne and Christoph Gäbler: Über die Marianen. Lehne-Verlag, Wohldorf in Germany 1972.
- Pagan
- "Pagan". Global Volcanism Program. Smithsonian Institution.
- WorldStatesman- Northern Marianas
- L, Klemen (1999–2000). "Forgotten Campaign: The Dutch East Indies Campaign 1941–1942". Archived from the original on July 26, 2011.
