= Operation Christmas Drop (film) =

- Official release poster
- Directed by: Martin Wood
- Written by: Gregg Rossen; Brian Sawyer
- Produced by: Brad Krevoy; Steven R. McGlothen
- Starring: Kat Graham; Alexander Ludwig
- Cinematography: Michael C. Blundell
- Edited by: Brad Rines
- Music by: Hamish Thomson
- Production companies: MPCA; Brad Krevoy Productions
- Distributed by: Netflix
- Release date: November 5, 2020 (United States)
- Running time: 95 minutes
- Country: United States
- Language: English

Operation Christmas Drop is a 2020 American Christmas romantic comedy film directed by Martin Wood from a screenplay by Gregg Rossen and Brian Sawyer, and stars Kat Graham and Alexander Ludwig.

The film is loosely based on the real-life U.S. Air Force Operation Christmas Drop humanitarian mission, and was released on November 5, 2020, by Netflix.

== Plot ==
Erica, a congressional assistant in Washington, DC for Congresswoman Bradford, is tasked with investigating a US Air Force base in Guam. As she is in charge of the Base Realignment and Closure Commission, Bradford's ultimate goal is to find a reason to justify its closure. So Erica is instructed to drop her Christmas plans to investigate in person.

U.S. Air Force Captain Andrew Jantz is in charge of the large-scale effort. He and his colleagues sacrifice their family traditions to help the islanders. Andrew is chosen to show Erica around the USAF base due to his strong people skills, to convince her that it should remain open.

Erica arrives two hours earlier than expected, and finds Andrew on the beach surfing before his shift. He takes her around the island, showing its beautiful spots, trying to steer away from her obsessive focus on costs. Finally Erica tires of the touristy narrative, so ditches Andrew at her first opportunity to try to explore on her own.

Erica comes across the area where items are being organised for Operation Christmas Drop. Andrew explains the base's decades- old, yearly tradition of airlifting goods to the small islands of Micronesia for Christmas. For each of her itemized financial concerns, he explains how the expenses are off-set so they are not costing taxpayers anything.

Andrew insists that Erica spend the next 24 hours letting him show her around the base and various islands before she presents her report, so can experience the project first-hand. At one island, they interact with the locals. Once Erica understands that some of the islands only have supplies and contact with the outside world, she gifts the contents of her bag, the bag itself, to the children.

Andrew explains how they gather local donations of food and money, proving that the base's resources, thus American tax dollars, are not being spent here. An example is given of how a shipment of 10 fir trees arrive there at no cost. Andrew's Oregon friend donated the trees, and they come via several connections through military flights. The trees are later traded in a Guam hotel for sheets and food donations.

At the base's big solar-powered fundraising event, the rest of Erica's skepticism dissipates and she and Andrew have a moment. The next day, as the care packages are being assembled, news of a serious typhoon comes to Guam. The planes are grounded, but Erica tells them to keep the faith.

The weather clears, and Erica opts to disobey Congresswoman Bradford's orders to head back to Washington. Just before the planes are set to take off, she shows up to again insist she leave. Erica stands up to her, suggesting she also participate. The experience inspires her, revitalizing her Christmas spirit and demonstrating that the tradition is worthwhile and the base should not be closed.

Romance between Erica and Andrew blooms during these events. Following his example, on Christmas Eve, she surprises him with his family which flew in with a news crew. Andrew and Erica finally kiss.

== Cast ==
- Kat Graham as Erica
- Alexander Ludwig as Captain Andrew Jantz
- Virginia Madsen as Congresswoman Bradford
- Janet Kidder as Lieutenant Colonel Blaine
- Jeffrey Joseph as Brigadier General Hatcher
- Bethany Brown as Sunshine
- Trezzo Mahoro as Joker
- Rohan Campbell as Travis
- Aliza Vellani as Sally
- Aaron Douglas as Sampson
- Xavier de Guzman as John-Michael
- Bruce Best as himself (Brother Bruce)
- Linden Banks as Haskell
- Eileen Pedde as Anna
- Brittany Willacy as Christina
- Anthony Salas as Big Tone
- Reymundo Villaflor as Sweeper
- Zainab Alzaba as Laura

== Production ==
In May 2019, it was reported that Kat Graham and Alexander Ludwig would star in Operation Christmas Drop for Netflix from a screenplay by Gregg Rossen and Brian Sawyer. Production of the film took place on the U.S. territory of Guam. It is one of the first movies filmed in Guam to receive wide distribution.

== Release ==
Operation Christmas Drop was released on November 5, 2020, by Netflix.

== Reception ==
On review aggregator Rotten Tomatoes, the film has an approval rating of 47% based on 17 reviews, with an average rating of 5.6/10.

== See also ==
- List of Christmas films
