= Island Soldier =

- Directed by: Nathan Fitch
- Written by: Bryan Chang, Nathan Fitch
- Cinematography: Nathan Fitch
- Edited by: Bryan Chang
- Music by: Bing & Ruth
- Production companies: Atoll Pictures; Pacific Islanders in Communications; the Humanities Guåhan; Meerkat Media
- Release dates: 8 April 2017 (Durham, NC)
- Running time: 86 minutes
- Countries: United States, Federated States of Micronesia

Island Soldier is a 2017 American documentary film written, directed and produced by former Peace Corps volunteer Nathan Fitch. The film deals with problems faced by United States Military families from Kosrae who are citizens of Federated States of Micronesia. Because of a free association agreement called the Compact of Free Association, they can serve, fight and die for the US in Afghanistan and Iraq but they cannot vote.

== Release ==
After its World Premiere at the Full Frame Film Festival in North Carolina, Island Soldier has screened at film festivals across the USA as well as Canada, the Czech Republic, Germany, Japan and Taiwan.

On Dec 15, 2017, a special screening was presented by the US Department of State and the US Department of the Interior at the Sidney Yates Auditorium in Washington, DC.

On April 4, 2018, a special screening was held on the island of Pohnpei in the Federated States of Micronesia.

On November 14, 2018, the film was broadcast on PBS television and the World Channel as part of the America ReFramed series.

== Reception ==
=== Critical response ===
Island Soldier has not received a rating on review aggregator website Rotten Tomatoes, but it has received mostly enthusiastic reviews.

Sheri Linden of the Hollywood Reporter praised it as "an affecting chronicle of gentle lives and quiet outrage." Jason Sanders, in Filmmaker Magazine, writes that the film "benefits from Fitch’s camerawork, empathy and connection to their subjects, while Bryan Chang’s deft editing does well to underline both Kosrae’s breathtaking natural beauty and its more prosaic, end-of-the road isolation that forces so many of its youth to leave." Sally Round, writing for Radio New Zealand, says the film "brings hope to FSM."

On the negative side, Chad Blair of the Honolulu City Beat criticized the film for asserting "that Micronesians are killed at a higher rate than soldiers born in the 50 states, though the evidence is limited."

=== Accolades ===
	Date of ceremony	Category	Nominee(s)	Result	Ref(s)
Guam International Film Festival	Oct 1, 2017	Grand Jury Award	Island Soldier	Nominated	
Guam International Film Festival	Oct 1, 2017	Best Documentary	Island Soldier	Nominated	
Guam International Film Festival	Oct 1, 2017	Audience Award	Island Soldier	Won	
San Diego Asian Film Festival	Nov 11, 2017	Audience Award	Island Soldier	Won	
Seattle Asian American Film Festival	April 24, 2017	Grand Jury Award - Best Feature	Island Soldier	Won	
Seattle Asian American Film Festival	April 24, 2017	Audience Choice - Feature Film	Island Soldier	Won	
Los Angeles Asian Pacific Film Festival	May 10, 2018	Best Documentary Feature	Island Soldier	Nominated	
Los Angeles Asian Pacific Film Festival	May 10, 2018	Best Cinematography	Nathan Fitch	Won	
Houston Asian American Pacific Islander Film Festival	June 11, 2018	Grand Jury Award - Best Documentary	Island Soldier	Won	

== See also ==
- Federated States of Micronesia–United States relations
- Human rights in the Federated States of Micronesia
