= Pagan Airstrip =

Airport on Pagan Island

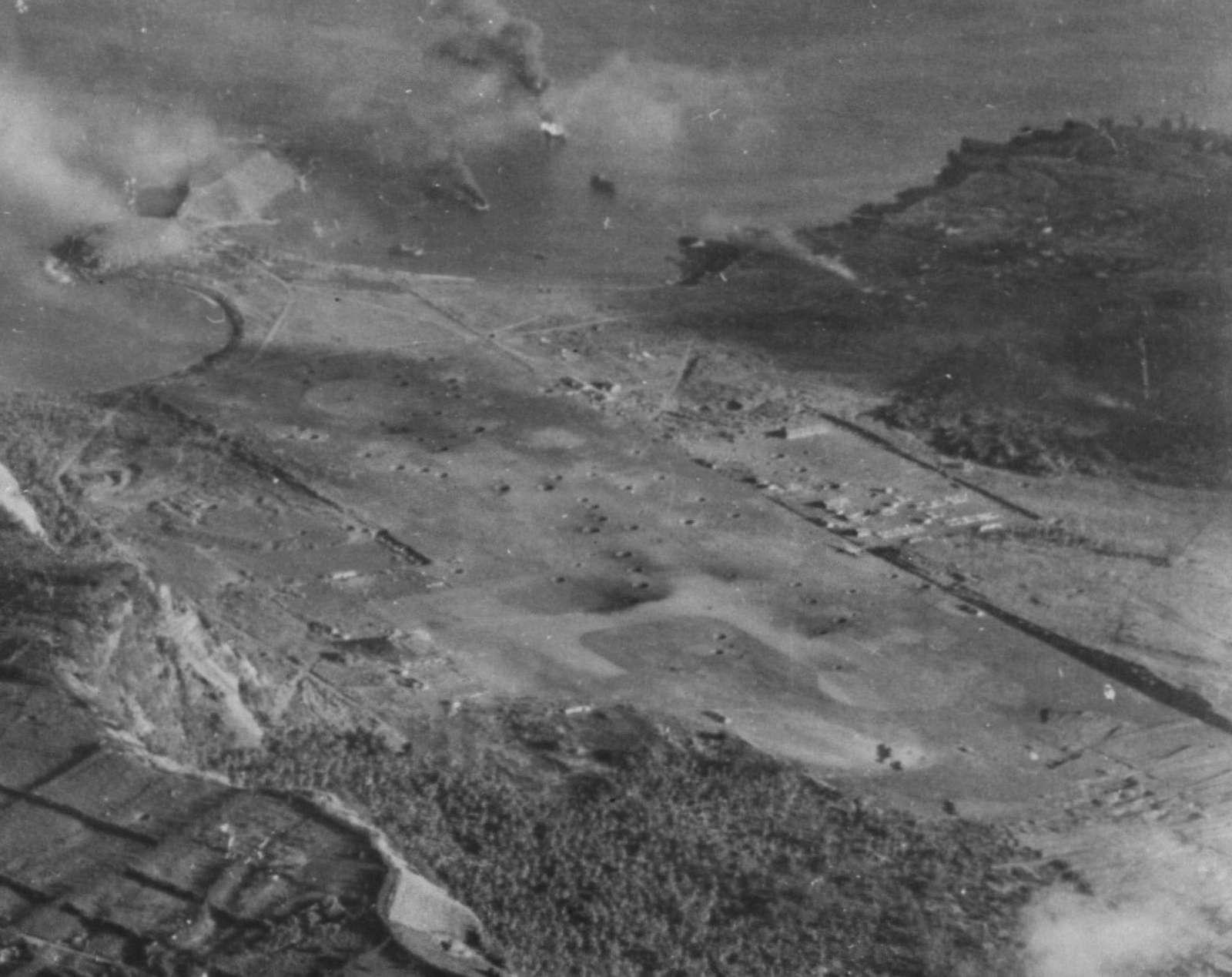
- The airfield in World War II during bombing by U.S. forces
- IATA: none; ICAO: none; FAA LID: TT01

Summary
- Airport type: Public
- Owner: Commonwealth Ports Authority
- Location: Pagan Island
- Built: 1939–1944; 1966–1970 (rebuilt)
- Elevation AMSL: 34 ft (10 m)
- Coordinates: 18°07′23″N 145°45′47″E

Maps
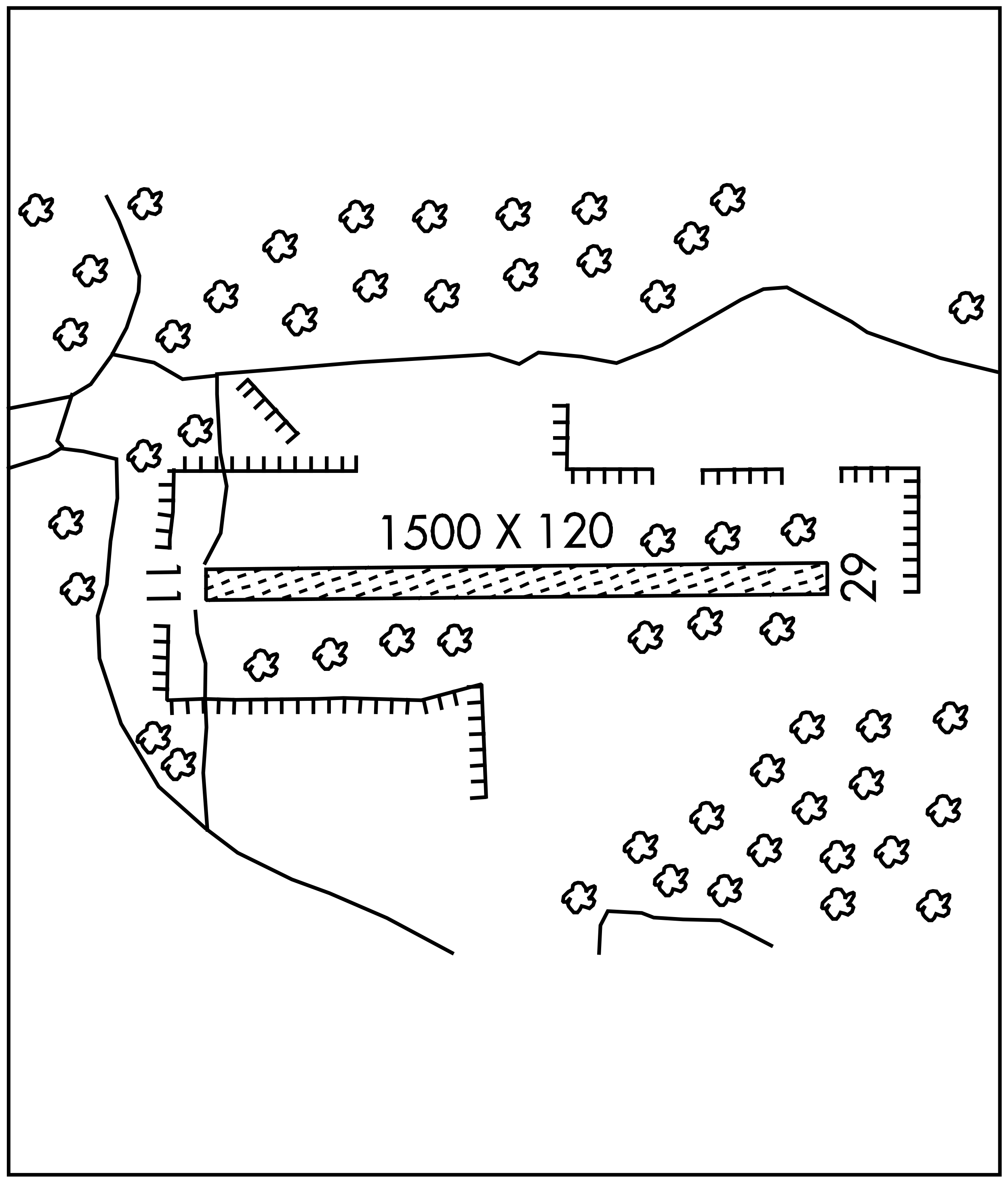
- FAA diagram of the airfield's layout

- Location of Pagan Airstrip within the Northern Mariana Islands

Runways
Direction	Length		Surface
Direction	ft	m	Surface
11/29	1,500	457	Turf/gravel

Statistics (1980)
- Aircraft operations: 240
- Source: Federal Aviation Administration

Pagan Airstrip (FAA LID: TT01) is a closed airfield located on Pagan Island in the United States Commonwealth of the Northern Mariana Islands, near the village of Shomu-Shon. The airport is owned by the Commonwealth Ports Authority.

== History ==
The airfield was originally built as a Japanese fighter airstrip and was called Shomushan Field. Construction took place between 1939 and 1944, with 200 workers from Japan and Korea building the 1,000 feet (300 m) runway and other defenses on the island.

On June 22, 1944, the airfield was attacked by U.S. carrier aircraft, with the attack destroying four Japanese aircraft on the ground, as well as damaging buildings and runways. It was subject to further bombing on September 26–27, 1944, with P-47 Thunderbolts and B-24 Liberators of the Seventh Air Force conducting attacks. The airfield was once attacked again on November 25–26, 1944, with U.S. Army Air Forces P-47 Thunderbolts and U.S. Navy F4U Corsairs bombed and strafed the island, in addition to downing two Japanese aircraft. In total, U.S. Army P-47 Thunderbolts and P-61 Black Widows flew 1,578 missions against the airfield between August 1944 and May 1945, with the Japanese continuously repairing the runway.

Japanese forces on Pagan surrendered in September 1945.

Initial efforts to put the airfield back into service began in autumn of 1966, with US$7,000 in funding from the Mariana Islands District Legislature leading to a usable runway. In February 1967, Emmet Kay, president of Micronesia Airlines, was the first pilot to land at the airfield since World War II. A formal dedication was held on April 3, 1967.

From May to October 1970, the airfield was further rebuilt by thirteen members of a U.S. Air Force Civic Action Team.

During a 12-month period ending September 26, 1980, the airport had 240 aircraft operations: 79% air taxi and 21% general aviation.

On May 15, 1981, Mount Pagan erupted, with lava flows covering about one-third of the airfield. Attempts by a civilian aircraft and a U.S. Navy P-3 Orion to land at the airstrip on the day of the eruption were unsuccessful, in part due to the volcano's ash cloud obscuring the airfield.

As of 2023, the airfield is listed as "closed indefinitely" in the Federal Aviation Administration's Airport/Facility Directory. It has not been inspected by the FAA since September 1980. A major issue with habitation and operations on the island has been the activity of the volcano, which has erupted periodically since the 1980s, the latest being in 2021.
