= List of ambassadors of the United States to the Federated States of Micronesia =

Ambassador of the United States to Micronesia
- Seal of the United States Department of State

- Flag of a United States ambassador

- Incumbent; Andrew Wylie; Chargé d'affaires since August 10, 2026
- Nominator: The president of the United States
- Appointer: The president; with Senate advice and consent
- Inaugural holder: Michael Gordon Wygant as U.S. Representative
- Formation: 1987
- Website: U.S. Embassy - Kolonia

This is a list of ambassadors of the United States to the Federated States of Micronesia.

Following World War II, the Federated States of Micronesia, along with several other island nations, were part of the United Nations Trust Territory of the Pacific Islands, under U.S. administration. Micronesia achieved independence in 1986. The United States recognized Micronesia immediately and established diplomatic relations. On November 3, 1986, the United States opened an Office of the U.S. Representative. The Representative, Michael Gordon Wygant, presented his credentials to the government of Micronesia on October 2, 1987. On September 20, 1989, the Office of the U.S. Representative was upgraded to embassy status. The first U.S. Ambassador to the Federated States of Micronesia, Aurelia E. Brazeal, presented her credentials on September 18, 1990.

== Ambassadors ==
Name	Title	Appointed	Presented credentials	Terminated mission	Notes
Michael G. Wygant – Career FSO	United States Representative	July 31, 1987	October 2, 1987	May 29, 1990	Mission upgraded to embassy September 20, 1989.
Aurelia E. Brazeal – Career FSO	Ambassador Extraordinary and Plenipotentiary	August 6, 1990	September 18, 1990	July 6, 1993	
March Fong Eu – Political appointee	Ambassador Extraordinary and Plenipotentiary	March 28, 1994	May 18, 1994	July 5, 1996	
Cheryl Ann Martin	Chargé d’Affaires a.i.	August 1996		October 19, 1999	
Diane Watson – Political appointee	Ambassador Extraordinary and Plenipotentiary	July 7, 1999	October 19, 1999	January 20, 2001	
Larry Miles Dinger – Career FSO	Ambassador Extraordinary and Plenipotentiary	November 26, 2001	January 14, 2002	August 2, 2004	
Suzanne K. Hale – Career FSO	Ambassador Extraordinary and Plenipotentiary	July 2, 2004	August 25, 2004	August 24, 2007	
Miriam K. Hughes – Career FSO	Ambassador Extraordinary and Plenipotentiary	May 30, 2007	September 11, 2007	September 14, 2009	
Peter A. Prahar – Career FSO	Ambassador Extraordinary and Plenipotentiary	November 23, 2009	December 14, 2009	August 5, 2012	
Dorothea-Maria Rosen – Career FSO	Ambassador Extraordinary and Plenipotentiary	August 9, 2012	August 17, 2012	July 20, 2016	
Robert Annan Riley III – Career FSO	Ambassador Extraordinary and Plenipotentiary	May 23, 2016	August 16, 2016	January 29, 2020	
Carmen Cantor – Career FSO	Ambassador Extraordinary and Plenipotentiary	December 31, 2019	January 31, 2020	August 4, 2022	
Alissa Bibb – Career FSO	Chargé d’Affaires a.i.	August 4, 2022		September 13, 2023	
Jennifer L. Johnson - Career FSO	Ambassador Extraordinary and Plenipotentiary	July 27, 2023	September 13, 2023	June 9, 2026	
Vincent Mut-Tracy – Career FSO	Chargé d’Affaires a.i.	June 9, 2026		August 10, 2026	
Andrew Wylie – Career FSO	Chargé d’Affaires a.i.	August 10, 2026		Present	

== See also ==
- Federated States of Micronesia – United States relations
- Foreign relations of the Federated States of Micronesia
- Ambassadors of the United States
