= Dorothea-Maria Rosen =

American diplomat

Doria Rosen
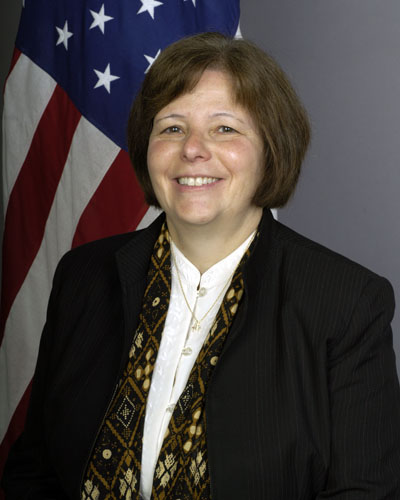

United States Ambassador to Micronesia
- In office August 17, 2012 – July 20, 2016
- President: Barack Obama
- Preceded by: Peter Prahar
- Succeeded by: Robert Riley

Personal details
- Born: September 7, 1950 (age 76) New York City, New York, U.S.
- Children: 3
- Education: Vassar College; Hofstra University

Dorothea-Maria "Doria" Rosen (born September 7, 1950) is a diplomat and the former U.S. Ambassador to the Federated States of Micronesia. She was nominated by President Barack Obama and her appointment was confirmed by the Senate on August 9, 2012. Rosen retired before the end of her term in August 2016.

== Early life and education ==
Rosen was born in New York City on September 7, 1950 and attended local public schools. She graduated from Vassar College in 1972 with an A.B. in psychology and a minor in education. In 1975 she received a J.D. from Hofstra University Law School. She was admitted to the New York State Bar in 1976 and to the California State Bar in 1977 and has studied French, Romanian, and German.

== Career ==
Since joining the foreign service department in 1981 Rosen has served in a variety of roles including serving as the Deputy Chief of Mission in Reykjavik, Iceland, from 2001 to 2004; consul general in Bern, Switzerland, from 2004 to 2008; and deputy principal officer in Frankfurt, Germany, from 2008 to 2011. She also briefly served as the Diplomat-in-Residence for the Midwest region before being nominated as the Ambassador to Micronesia.

== Personal life ==
Rosen has three children. She also served as an active duty Captain in the U.S. Army Judge Advocate General’s Corps from 1976 until 1979 and in the Army reserve from 1979 until 1981.

Diplomatic posts
Preceded by Peter Prahar	United States Ambassador to Micronesia; 2012–2016	Succeeded by Robert Riley
