= Carmen G. Cantor =

American diplomat (born 1968)

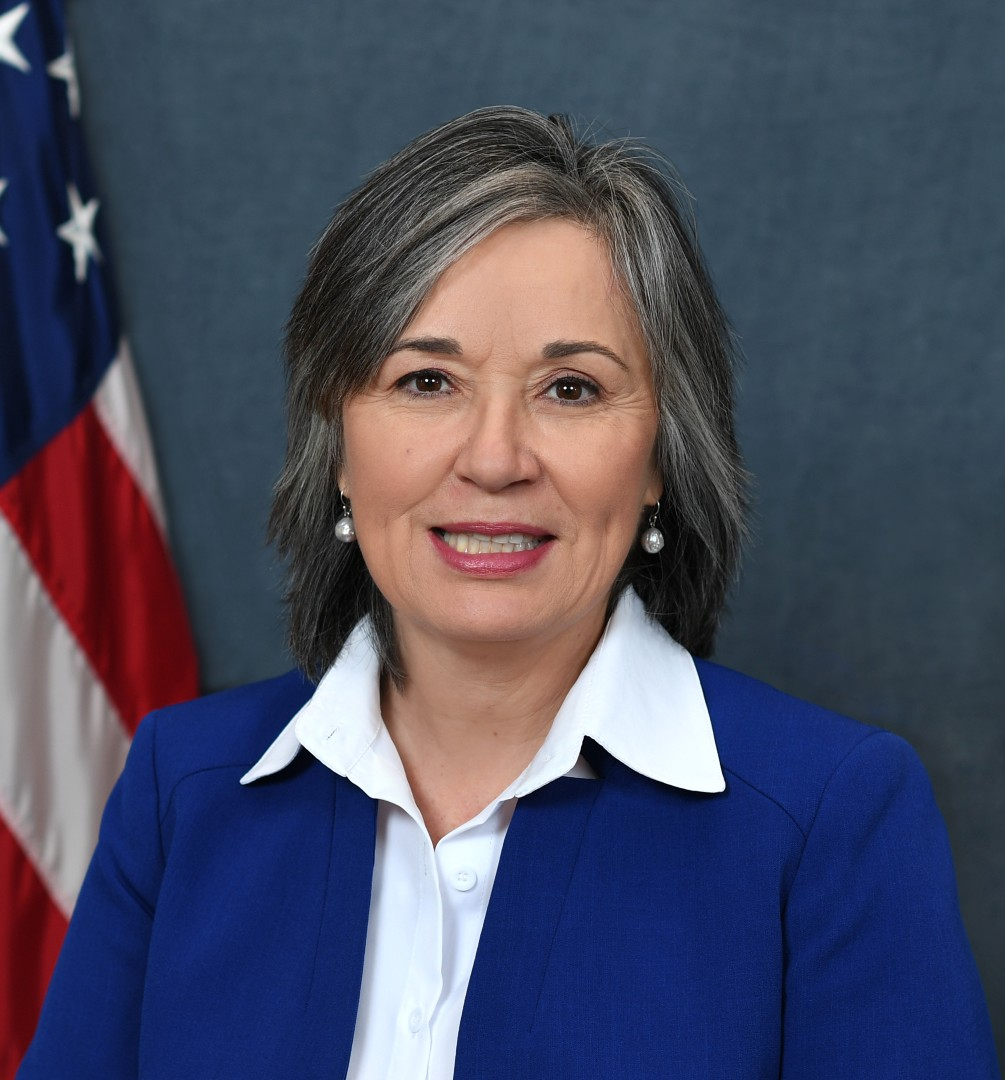

Assistant Secretary of the Interior for Insular and International Affairs
- In office August 4, 2022 – January 18, 2025
- President: Joe Biden
- Preceded by: Douglas Domenech
- Succeeded by: William W. Hauge

United States Ambassador to the Federated States of Micronesia
- In office January 31, 2020 – August 4, 2022
- President: Donald Trump; Joe Biden
- Preceded by: Robert Annan Riley III
- Succeeded by: Jennifer L. Johnson

Personal details
- Born: Carmen G. Castro; February 23, 1968 (age 58) Puerto Rico
- Education: University of Puerto Rico at Mayagüez (BA); Interamerican University of Puerto Rico (MA)

Carmen Gloria Cantor (born February 23, 1968) is an American diplomat who served as the U.S. assistant secretary of the interior for insular affairs from 2022 to 2025. She previously served as the United States ambassador to the Federated States of Micronesia. Since November 2025, she has served as Deputy Executive Director of the United Nations Security Council Counterterrorism Executive Directorate in New York. In 2025 she published her memoir "The Ambassador: Two Hats. Two Presidents," an Amazon best seller.

== Early life and education ==
Cantor was born in Puerto Rico and raised in the city of Mayagüez. Her father was a veteran of the United States Army. After initially studying industrial engineering, she earned a Bachelor of Arts degree in sociology from the University of Puerto Rico at Mayagüez. She later earned a Master of Arts from the Interamerican University of Puerto Rico.

== Career ==
Cantor is a career member of the Senior Executive Service. Before joining the Department of State, Cantor served in the United States Postal Service. She later served as director of the Office of Civil Rights for the Foreign Agricultural Service, and as director of the Office of Equal Employment Opportunity at the Federal Maritime Commission. Previous posts at the Department of State include being executive director of the Bureau of Educational and Cultural Affairs and Bureau of International Information Programs from 2013 to 2016, executive director of the Bureau of Counterterrorism and Countering Violent Extremism from 2011 to 2013, and serving as deputy director for recruitment, examination, and employment. From 2016 to 2019, she was the director of civil service human resource management at the State Department.

=== Ambassador to Micronesia ===
On July 15, 2019, President Donald Trump announced his intent to nominate Cantor as the next ambassador to Micronesia. Her nomination was sent to the United States Senate on July 17, 2019. Hearings on her nomination were held before the United States Senate Committee on Foreign Relations on October 16, 2019. The committee favorably reported her nomination to the Senate floor on November 20, 2019. On December 19, 2019, her nomination was confirmed by voice vote.

On January 31, 2020, she presented her credentials to President David W. Panuelo.

=== U.S Interior Department ===
On March 11, 2022, Cantor was nominated by President Joe Biden to serve as the assistant secretary of the interior for insular and international affairs. Hearings on her nomination were held before the Senate Energy Committee on April 28, 2022. The committee favorably reported the nomination to the Senate on June 14, 2022. She was confirmed by voice vote on July 20, 2022.

== Personal life ==
Cantor is fluent in Spanish. She is married to Carlos A. Cantor. Carmen Cantor has one sister, three daughters, and three stepchildren.

== See also ==
- List of ambassadors of the United States

Diplomatic posts
Preceded by Robert Annan Riley III	United States Ambassador to the Federated States of Micronesia; January 31, 2020–August 4, 2022	Succeeded by Jennifer L. Johnson
