= Michael G. Wygant =

American diplomat (born 1936)

1st United States Ambassador to the Federated States of Micronesia
- In office October 2, 1987 – May 29, 1990
- Preceded by: Office established
- Succeeded by: Aurelia E. Brazeal

Personal details
- Born: Michael Gordon Wygant; 1936 (age 89–90) Newburgh, New York, U.S.
- Education: Dartmouth College
- Profession: Diplomat

Michael Gordon Wygant (born 1936, Newburgh, New York) is a former American diplomat who was the head of the Organization for Security and Co-operation in Europe (OSCE) Armenia office and was the first United States Ambassador to the Federated States of Micronesia.

Wygant graduated from Dartmouth College.
