= Jennifer L. Johnson =

American diplomat

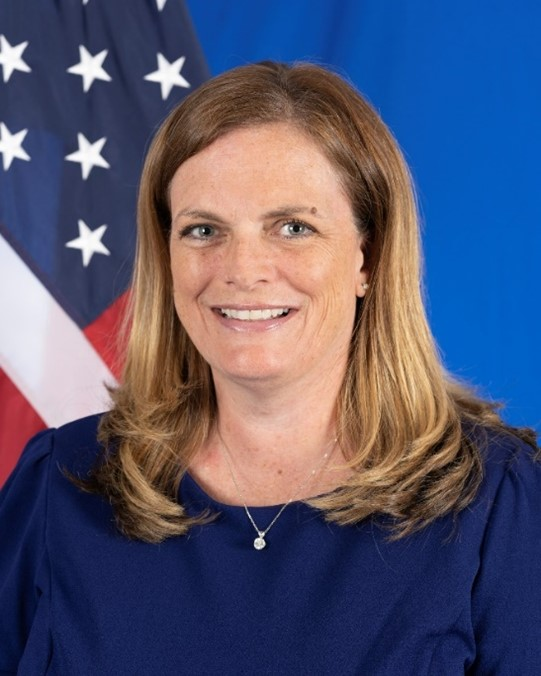

United States Ambassador to the Federated States of Micronesia
- In office September 13, 2023 – June 9, 2026
- President: Joe Biden; Donald Trump
- Preceded by: Carmen G. Cantor

Personal details
- Education: Villanova University (BA); National War College (MS)

Jennifer L. Johnson is an American diplomat and U.S. State Department official who had served as the United States ambassador to the Federated States of Micronesia.

== Early life and education ==
A native of New York, Johnson earned a Bachelor of Arts from Villanova University and studied abroad at the University of New South Wales in Australia. She earned a Master of Science from the National War College.

== Career ==
Johnson is a career member of the Senior Foreign Service with the rank of minister-counselor. Early in her career, she was selected to participate in the Una Chapman Cox Sabbatical Leave Fellowship. Previously, Johnson served overseas in leadership positions at U.S. embassies and consulates in Cuba, Chile, United Arab Emirates, and Turkey. She has held domestic positions at the United States Mission to the United Nations in New York, the Office of the Under Secretary for Management, the Executive Secretariat, the Bureau of Western Hemisphere Affairs, and the Bureau of Global Talent Management. She previously served as acting deputy assistant secretary and director of the Office of Policy Coordination in the Bureau of Global Talent Management and as chief of staff to the Under Secretary of State for Management.

=== U.S. ambassador to Micronesia ===
On January 23, 2023, President Joe Biden nominated Johnson to serve as the United States ambassador to the Federated States of Micronesia. Hearings on her nomination were held before the Senate Foreign Relations Committee on May 17, 2023. Her nomination was reported favorably by the committee on June 8, 2023, and was confirmed by the Senate on July 27, 2023 by voice vote. Johnson presented her credentials to the President of Federated States of Micronesia Wesley Simina on September 13, 2023.

== Personal life ==
Johnson speaks Spanish, Turkish, and Japanese.

Diplomatic posts
Preceded by Carmen G. Cantor	United States Ambassador to the Federated States of Micronesia; 2023–present	Incumbent
