= NORAD Tracks Santa =

Annual tracking program around Christmas

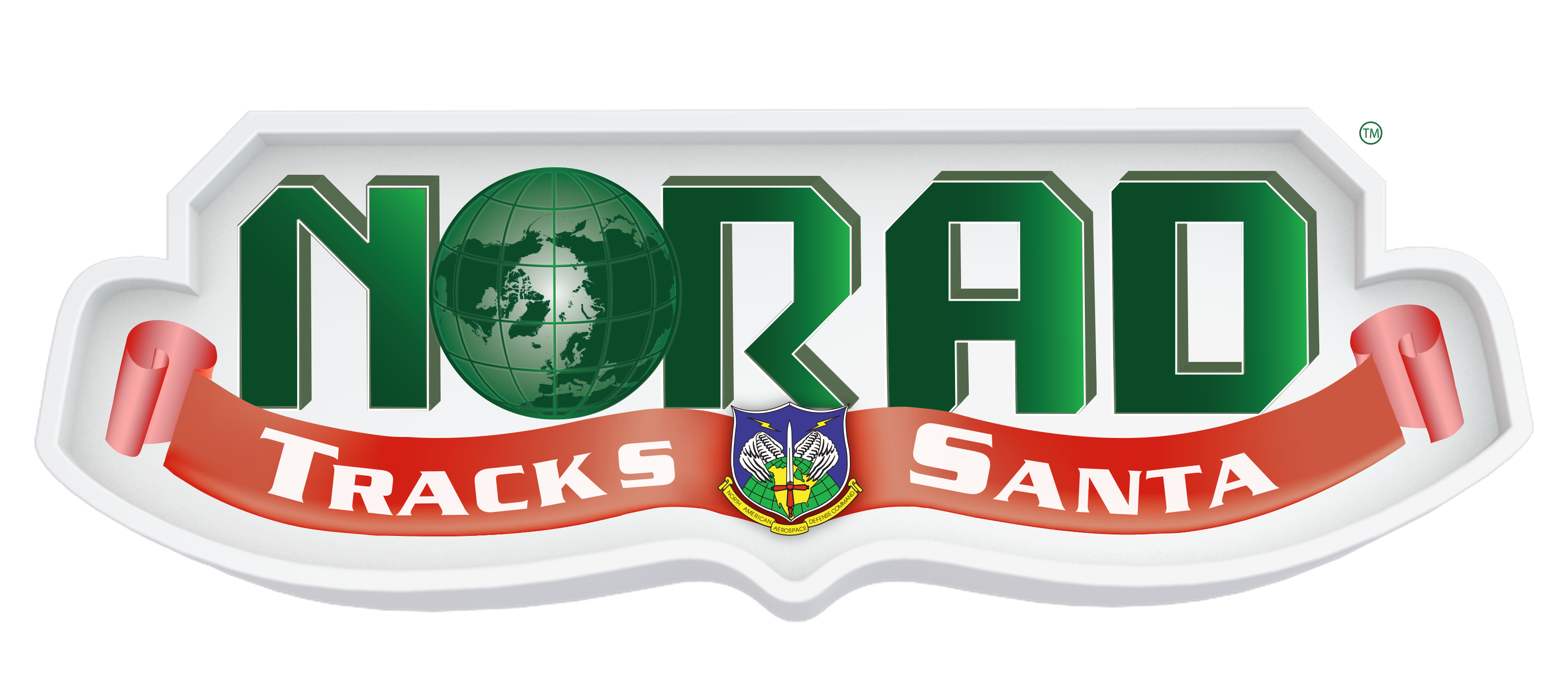
- The emblem of NORAD Tracks Santa

Contact information
- Status: Operational December 1–24
- Phone: 877-446-6723
- Website: www.noradsanta.org
- Launch date: December 24, 1955; 70 years ago

NORAD Tracks Santa, also called NORAD Santa Tracker, is an annual program in which the North American Aerospace Defense Command (NORAD) purports to track Santa Claus as he leaves the North Pole and travels around the world on his mission to deliver presents to children on Christmas Eve. The program starts on December 1, but the actual Santa-tracking starts at midnight annually on December 24. It is a community outreach function of NORAD, and has been held annually since 1955. Although NORAD claims to use radar and other technologies to track Santa, the website merely simulates the tracking of Santa.

The program follows the tradition of the September 1897 editorial "Yes, Virginia, there is a Santa Claus" in the New York Sun and was an inspiration of the Google Santa Tracker, which launched in December 2004.

== History and overview ==
=== Background ===
On December 24, 1948, the United States Air Force issued a communique claiming that an "early warning radar net to the north" had detected "one unidentified sleigh, powered by eight reindeer, at 14,000 feet [4,300 meters], heading 180 degrees." The Associated Press passed this "report" along to the general public. It was the first time that the United States Armed Forces issued a statement about tracking Santa Claus' sleigh on Christmas Eve, though it was a one-time event, not repeated over the next several years.

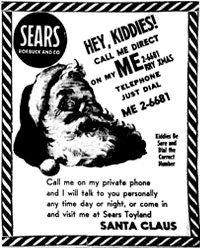
The 1955 Sears ad with, according to legend, the misprinted telephone number that led to the NORAD Tracks Santa program

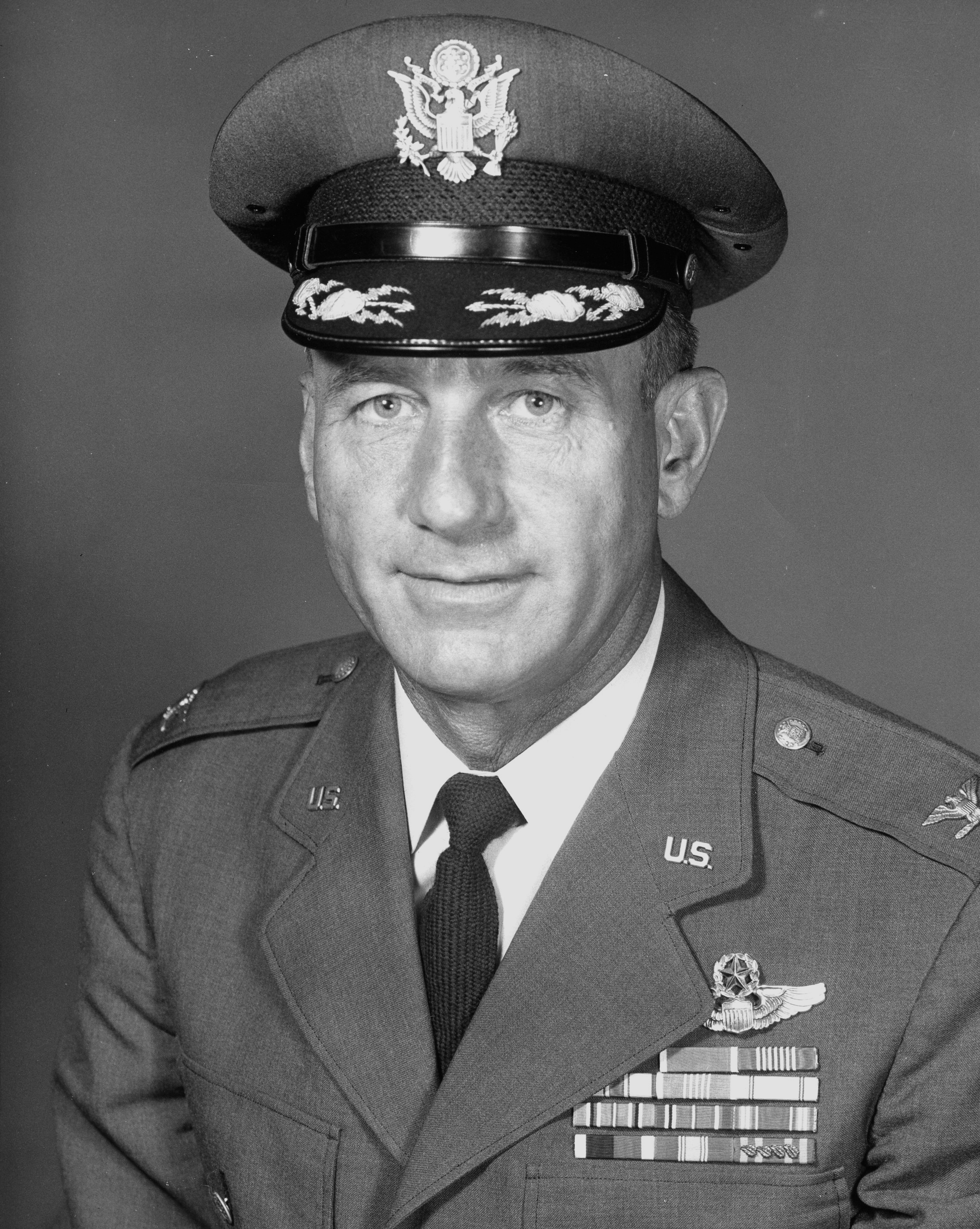
Harry Shoup, the Santa Colonel

=== Origin ===
In 1955, a Sears department store placed an advertisement in the Colorado Springs newspaper The Gazette, which told children they could place a call to Santa Claus and included the number ME 2-6681. The number printed was only a single digit away from the number for Colorado Springs' Continental Air Defense Command (CONAD) Center.

According to interviews, in December 1955, a call allegedly came through to CONAD. Colonel Harry Shoup answered the call. The caller, a little girl, asked Shoup if he was Santa Claus. Shoup, a serious man, initially thought the call to be a practical joke and responded gruffly. Upon realizing the child was serious, he softened his tone and asked to speak to the child's mother; it was then that he learned of the advertisement. Some sources assert that he received numerous similar calls that night, in response to which he had his operators give children the "current location" for Santa Claus. Actually, the child had misdialed the number, and only that one child called that night.

On Christmas Eve, when a member of Shoup's staff placed a picture of Santa on a board used to track unidentified aircraft that December, Shoup saw a public relations opportunity for CONAD. He asked CONAD's public affairs officer Colonel Barney Oldfield to inform the press that CONAD was tracking Santa's sleigh. In his release to the press, Oldfield added that "CONAD, Army, Navy, and Marine Air Forces will continue to track and guard Santa and his sleigh on his trip to and from the U.S. against possible attack from those who do not believe in Christmas."

Over the following years, the legend of how the annual event originated began to change. By 1961, Shoup's version of the story was that he had not been gruff with the child but instead had identified himself as Santa Claus when he spoke to the child on the phone. Shoup and his family later modified the story further, adding that the child had dialed the "red telephone"—an impossibility, because the hotline was connected with the Strategic Air Command by an enclosed cable, and no one could dial in from the outside—rather than the regular phone on Shoup's desk, that it was a misprint in an advertisement that led the child to call him rather than the child misdialing the number, and that a flood of calls had come in from children on Christmas Eve 1955 rather than from just one child on November 30.

Shoup did not intend to repeat the stunt in 1956, but Oldfield informed him that the Associated Press and United Press International were awaiting reports that CONAD again was claiming to be tracking Santa Claus. Shoup agreed that Oldfield should announce it again, and the annual tradition was born.

In 1958, the North America Air Defense Command (NORAD) took over the reporting responsibility from CONAD, and the reporting became more elaborate as the years passed. On December 24, 1960, for example, NORAD's northern command post at Saint-Hubert, Quebec, Canada, provided regular updates of a supposed sleigh operated by "S. Claus" which it identified as "undoubtedly friendly". During the evening, NORAD claimed that the sleigh had made an emergency landing on the ice of Hudson Bay, where Royal Canadian Air Force (RCAF) interceptor aircraft claimed to have been sent to investigate supposedly discovered Santa bandaging his reindeer Dancer's front foot, after which the RCAF planes were said to have escorted him when he resumed his journey.

Eventually, NORAD, which was renamed the North American Aerospace Defense Command in 1981, openly published a hotline number for the general public to call to get updates on Santa Claus' supposed progress.

=== Recent history ===
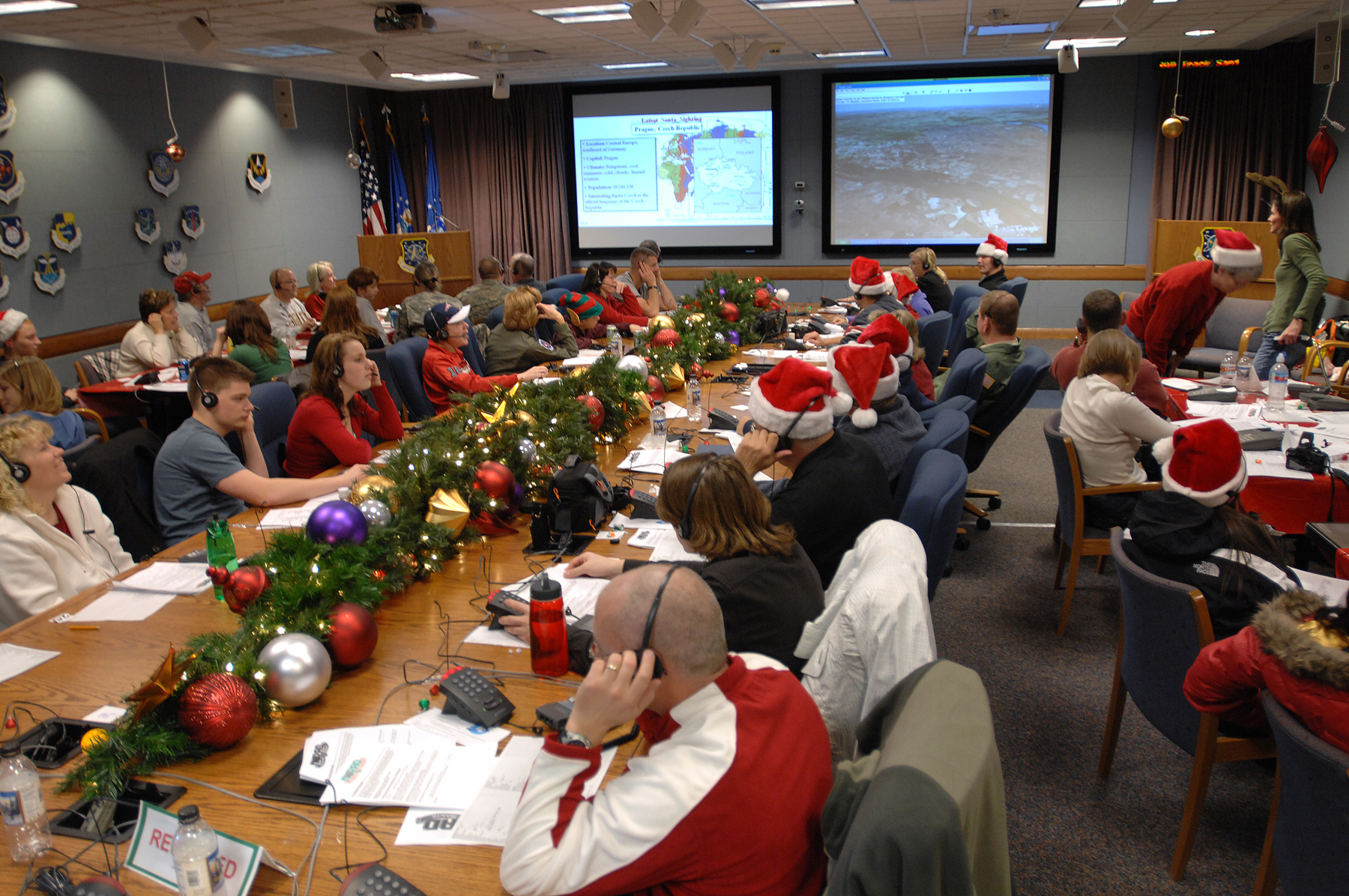
NORAD volunteers answering phone calls in 2007

NORAD relies on volunteers to make the program possible. Each volunteer handles about 40 telephone calls per hour and the team typically handles more than 12,000 e-mails and more than 70,000 telephone calls from more than two hundred countries and territories. Most of these contacts happen during the twenty-five hours from 2 a.m. on December 24 until 3 a.m. MST on December 25. A website called NORADSanta.org was established to allow project access for Internet users. Not only does NORAD simulate the tracking of Santa's sleigh, but it also tells the user the exact number of presents he is "delivering" at any moment on Christmas Eve. NORAD begins "tracking" at midnight MST, and even provides a depiction of Santa's pre-delivery ritual.

Since December 2007, Google Analytics has been used to analyze website traffic. As a result of this analysis information, the program can project and scale volunteer staffing, telephone equipment, and computer equipment needs for Christmas Eve. Volunteers include NORAD military and civilian personnel.

In 2014, NORAD answered more than 100,000 phone calls. In 2015, more than 1,200 U.S. and Canadian military personnel volunteered to staff the phone lines.

In 2018, more than 1,500 volunteers staffed the phone lines despite the shutdown of the US government.

In December 2019, the noradsanta.org website received 8.9 million visitors.

In 2020, NORAD announced they would continue the Santa Tracker, despite the COVID-19 pandemic. They would operate with a limited number of volunteers answering calls and some people who try to reach the Santa-tracking hotline would receive an automated message. The 3D depiction of Santa Claus on the tracker showed him wearing a mask while in his sleigh until 2022, where the feature was removed. The full service was re-established in 2022 and about 1,000 volunteers from the United States and Canada still answered the phones by 2025.

== Website and other media ==
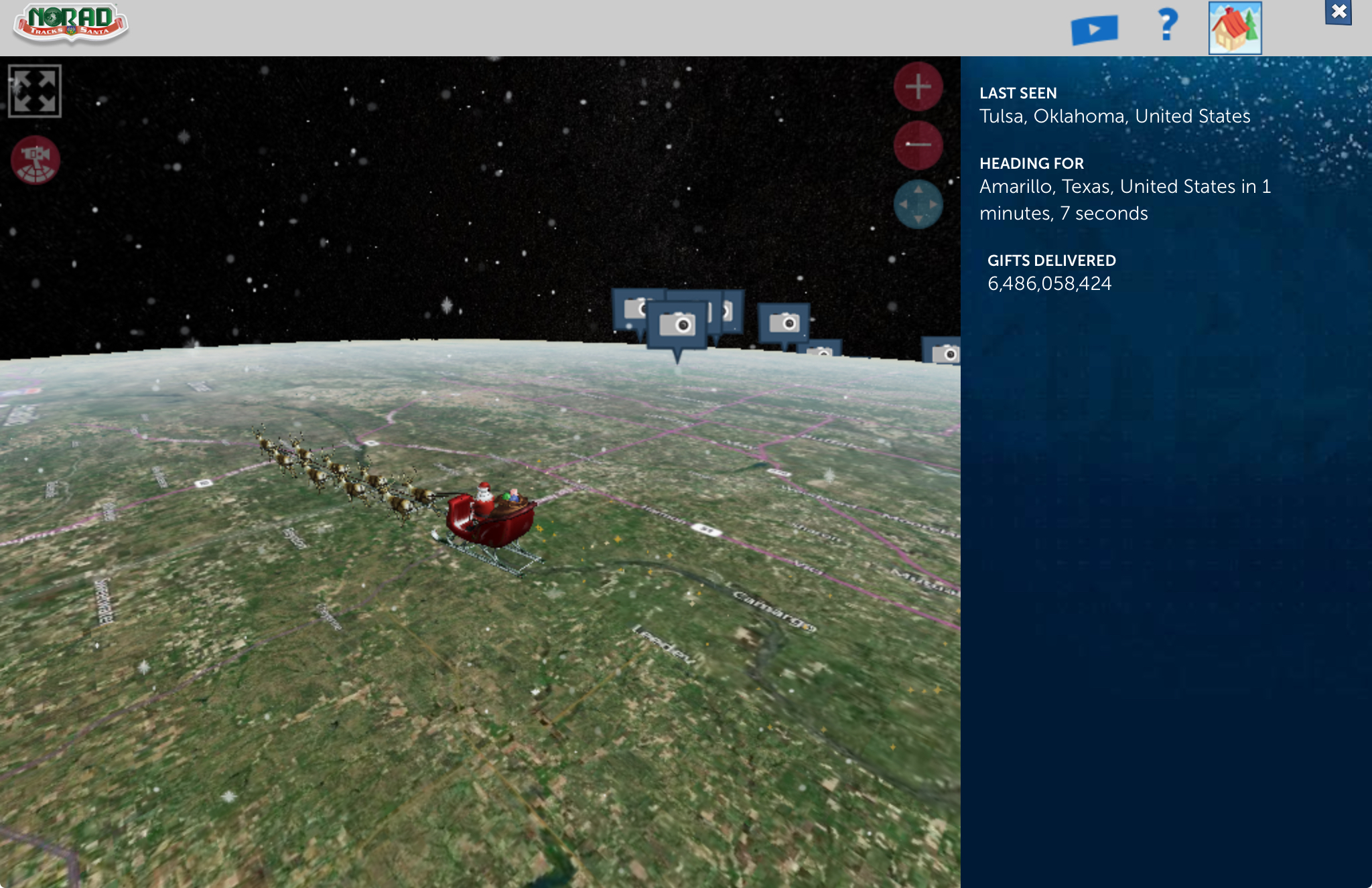
Screenshot of the live NORAD Tracks Santa web page, 2023

The NORAD Tracks Santa program has always made use of a variety of media. From the 1950s to 1996, these were the telephone hotline, newspapers, radio, phonograph records, and television. Many television newscasts in North America feature NORAD Tracks Santa as part of their weather updates on Christmas Eve.

Since 1997, the program has had a highly publicized internet presence. As mobile media and social media have become popular and widespread as methods of direct communication, these newer media have also been embraced by the program. The layout of the NORAD Tracks Santa website and its web pages have changed from 1997 to the present due to changes in internet technologies, and changes in partners and sponsors for a particular year. In September 2008, NORAD started a Twitter account, @NORADSanta, as part of its social media presence.

Between 2007 and 2008, people who visited the NORAD Tracks Santa site were told they could track Santa in Google Earth. They were given a link to download Google Earth, and then a KMZ file to download. From 2009 to 2011, the tracking in the Google Earth app was moved to the Google Earth Web API on the NORAD Santa website. In 2011, an iOS and Android application was introduced, which features updates and an interactive game similar to the Christmas levels in Angry Birds Seasons, called Elf Toss.

From mid-January until November 30, when one arrives at the NORAD Tracks Santa website, one is greeted with a message to come back on December 1 to track Santa with NORAD. During December, one finds a NORAD Tracks Santa website with all the features available. On Christmas Eve, the NORAD Tracks Santa website videos page is generally updated each hour, when it is midnight in a different time zone. The "Santa Cam" videos show CGI images of Santa flying over famous landmarks. Each video was accompanied by a voice-over until the end of the 2011 season, typically done by NORAD personnel, giving a few facts about the city or country depicted. In 2012, the voice overs were replaced with music done by the US Air Force Band. The voice overs returned in the 2013 season.

Celebrity voice-overs have also been used over the years. For the London "Santa Cam" video, Jonathan Ross did the voice-over for 2005 to 2007 and Ringo Starr narrated the same video in 2003 and 2004. In 2002, Aaron Carter provided the voice-over for three videos.

Since 2012, Analytical Graphics, Inc. has used their Cesium platform to build a 3D map for visualizing Santa's location with more accurate global terrain and satellite imagery than before. NORAD reported that for Christmas 2013, it logged 19.58 million unique visitors to its website on Christmas Eve, and 1,200 volunteers answered 117,371 calls. Through social media, it had 146,307 Twitter followers and 1.45 million "likes" on Facebook. That year, NORAD contracted with Bing Maps to provide 2D map tracking, ending a five-year contract with Google.

In 2014, NORAD logged almost 20 million visits to its Santa Tracker.

== Sponsorship and publicity ==
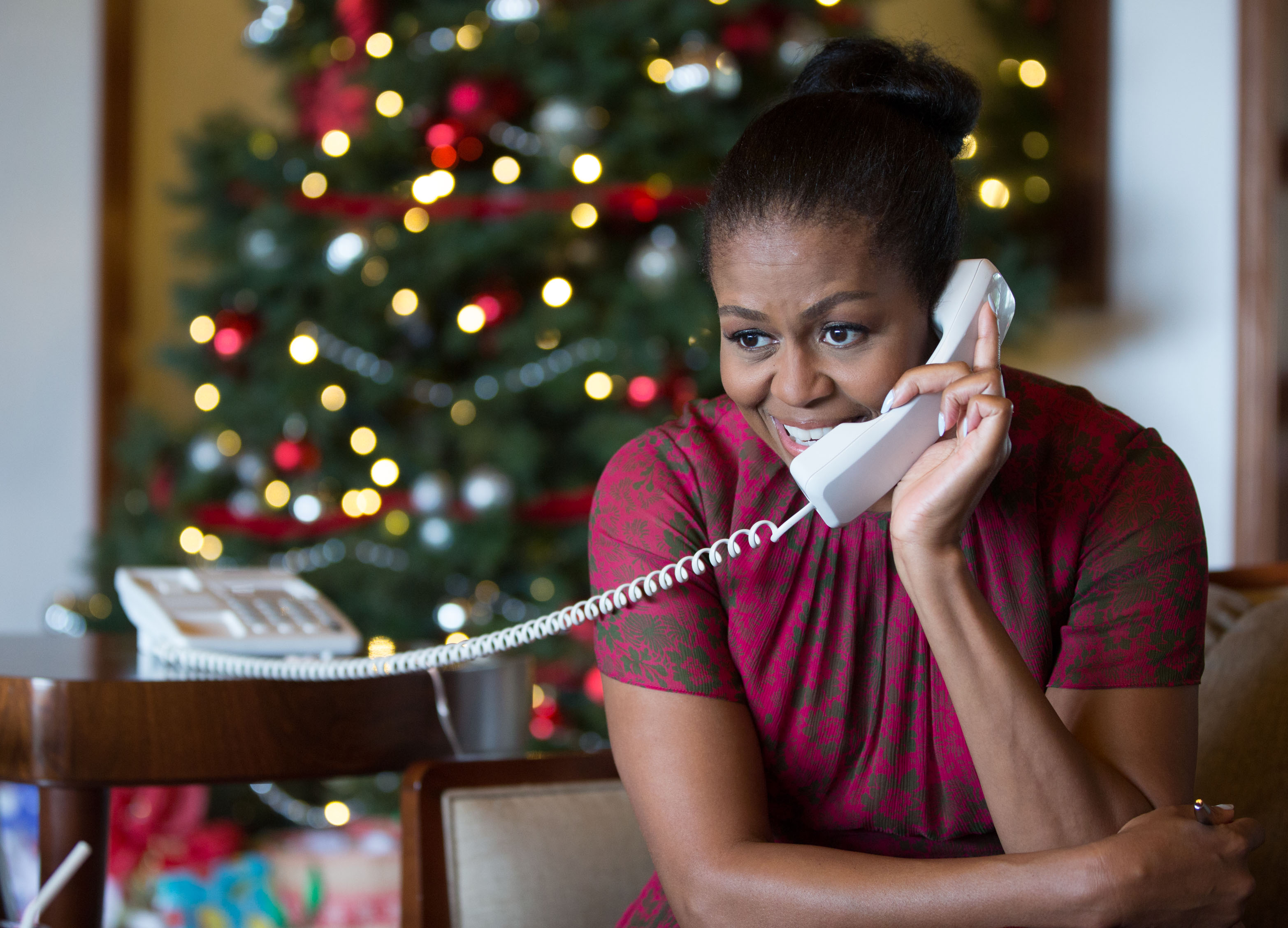
First Lady Michelle Obama reacts while talking on the phone to children across the country as part of NORAD Tracks Santa 2016.

NORAD Tracks Santa relies on corporate sponsorship, and is financed by neither American nor Canadian taxpayers.

U.S. military units have provided publicity for the program, including the Northeast Air Defense Sector of the New York Air National Guard and the U.S. Naval Reserve Navy Information Bureau (NIB) 1118 at Fort Carson, Colorado, as have the Canadian Armed Forces.

Other U.S. federal agencies, such as the National Aeronautics and Space Administration (NASA) and National Oceanic and Atmospheric Administration (NOAA), have helped publicize the service. Former First Lady Michelle Obama participated in the program from 2009 to 2016, answering phone calls. Donald Trump did so as well in December 2025.

According to Gerry Bowler, a history professor at the University of Manitoba, the NORAD Tracks Santa program is "one of the few modern additions to the centuries-old Santa Claus story that have stuck." Bowler stated that the program "takes an essential element of the Santa Claus story—his travels on Christmas Eve—and looks at it through a technological lens," therefore bringing the Santa Claus legend into the modern era.

== See also ==
- Google Santa Tracker, a service inspired by NORAD Tracks Santa
- Operation Christmas Drop, annual U.S. Air Force airdrop over Micronesia
