= Operation Christmas Drop =

Annual humanitarian airlift

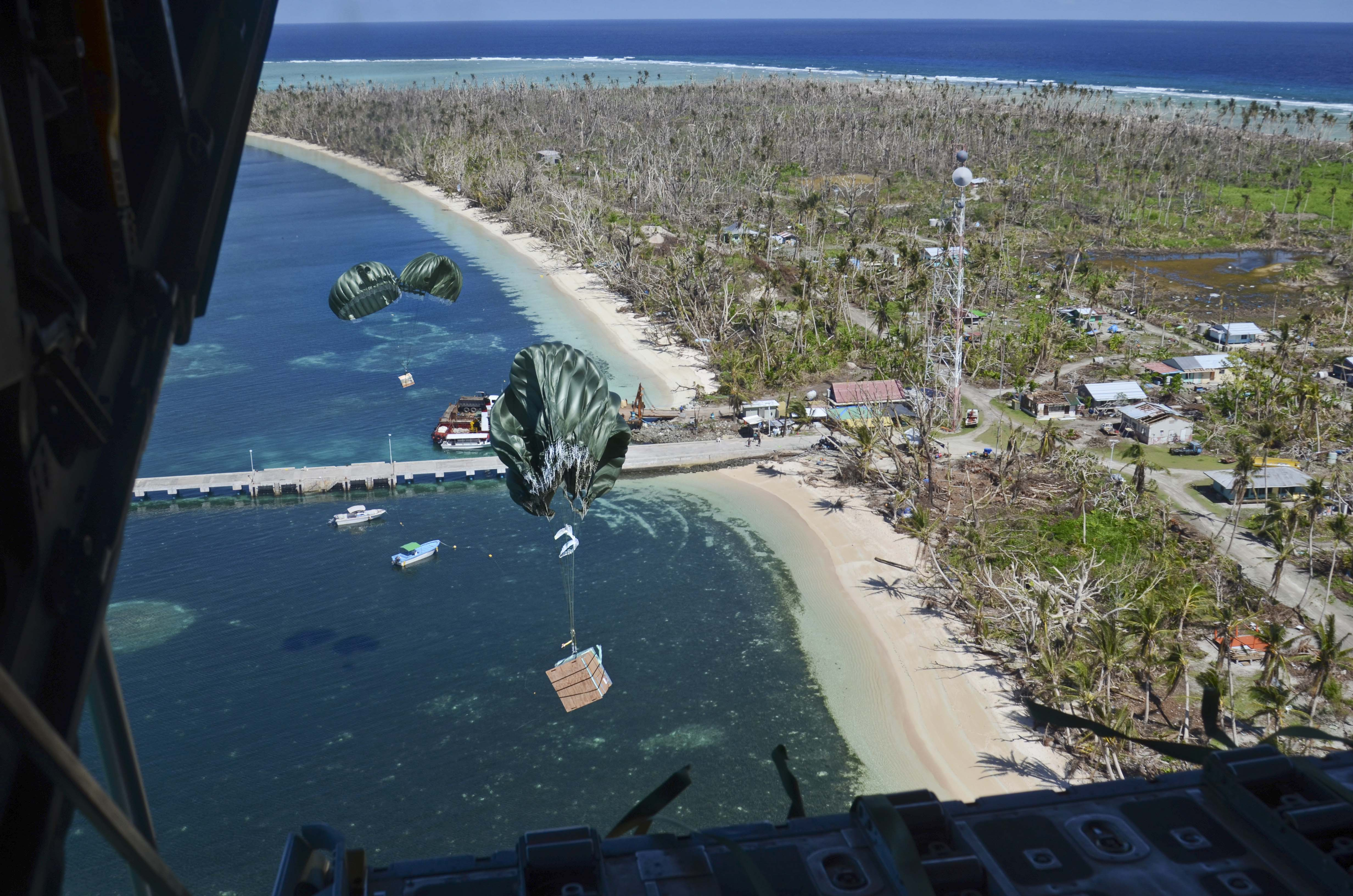
- Supplies are dropped over Kayangel in Palau, 2013
- Location: Micronesia
- Objective: Distribute Christmas gifts in Micronesia, train American service men and women, provide a trilateral training opportunity for Pacific allies
- Date: 1952–present

Operation Christmas Drop is a tradition that started in 1952 that serves as a training mission for the U.S. Air Force. It has since become the longest-running U.S. Department of Defense mission in full operation, and the longest-running humanitarian airlift in the world. Supported by the local communities of Guam, it is primarily conducted from Andersen Air Force Base and Yokota Air Base, and targets Micronesia.

== Description ==
The drop is the oldest ongoing Department of Defense mission which remains in full operation, and the longest running humanitarian airlift in the world. By 2006, more than 800,000 pounds (360,000 kg) of supplies were delivered. The operation gives troops the chance to practice humanitarian aid drops, which they may later be expected to conduct during deployment.

Volunteers from Andersen Air Force Base, including 734th Air Mobility Squadron, 44th Aerial Port Squadron and both crew and aircraft from the 36th Airlift Squadron at Yokota Air Base, Japan, participate in the operation. Members of the Guam community also help the operation. Money is raised for the operation by sponsored activities such as golf tournaments and sponsored runs, as well as local businesses sponsoring individual boxes. (As of December 2024, the Anderson website calls for the donation of specific items such as antifungal cream and canned food to the boxes, though the page hasn't been updated since December 2021. The page of the private organization calls for both monetary and material goods donations.)

The local 'Operation Christmas Drop' private organization leads fundraising activities. The Denton Humanitarian Assistance Program authorizes the military to perform humanitarian shipment on behalf of private organizations.

Each box dropped from a C-130 aircraft weighs nearly 400 pounds (180 kg) and contains items such as fishing nets, construction materials, powdered milk, canned goods, rice, coolers, clothing, shoes, toys and school supplies. The containers are dropped in water just off the beaches in order to avoid them hitting the locals. In the modern form, about 40 tons are dropped per year.

Air crew communicate with target villages through ham radio. The operation is militarily classified as a Low Cost Low Altitude (LCLA) airdrop, which means that existing resources and repurposed personnel parachutes are used to build supply bundles for cheap, and drops are performed at low altitude for accuracy. The specific type of LCLA is called Coast Humanitarian Air Drop (CHAD).

== History ==
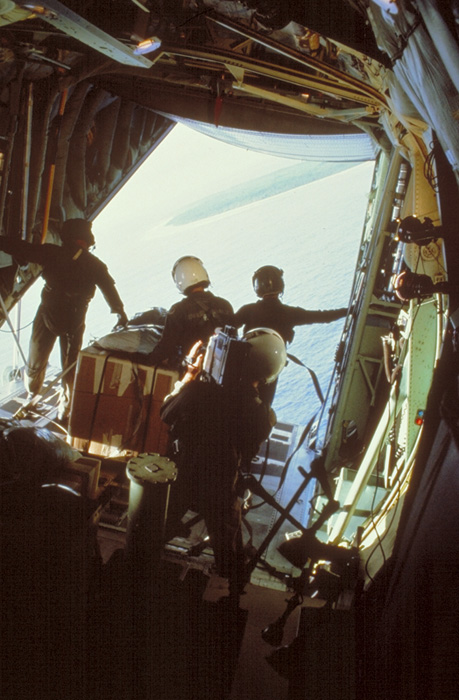
An airdrop in 1986

The operation was first conducted in 1951, when the aircrew of a WB-29 aircraft assigned to the 54th Weather Reconnaissance Squadron, formerly assigned to Andersen Air Force Base in Guam, was flying a mission to the south of Guam over the Micronesian atoll of Kapingamarangi. When they saw the islanders waving to them, the crew quickly gathered some items they had on the plane, placed them in a container with a parachute attached and dropped the cargo as they circled again.

A witness to the first drop on the island of Agrigan said "We saw these things come out of the back of the airplane and I was yelling: 'There are toys coming down'". At the time the island had no electricity or running water, and the islands were periodically hit by typhoons. Some of the first containers failed to arrive where intended, and islanders swam out to retrieve some, while others were discovered months later some miles away.

The 2006 operation saw 140 boxes dropped to 59 islands. The 2011 operation included dropping twenty five boxes of IV fluids to Fais Island in order to combat a local outbreak of dengue fever.

In 2014, The Pacific Air Forces delivered 50,000 pounds of supplies to 56 Micronesian Islands.

In 2015, the Japan Air Self-Defense Force and the Royal Australian Air Force participated in the operation along with the United States Air Force. Japan and Australia each provided one C-130 Hercules to join the three C-130s provided by the United States. The JASDF and RAAF also participated in the 2016 and 2017 operations.

In response to the COVID-19 pandemic, Micronesian president David Panuelo opted out of the 69th Operation Christmas Drop in 2020. According to master sergeant Anthony Biecheler, the drop will continue as planned over the Republic of Palau and the US Air Force has taken extensive measures to prevent the spread of COVID-19 from the deliveries. In 2021, the Republic of Korea Air Force participated for the first time, while the Royal Canadian Air Force participated for the first time in 2023.

== In media ==
Operation Christmas Drop is fictionally portrayed in a Netflix film of the same name. The film debuted on the platform on November 5, 2020, and stars Kat Graham and Alexander Ludwig.

== See also ==
- Cargo cult
- Federated States of Micronesia–United States relations
- International Ice Patrol
- NORAD Tracks Santa
