= Google Santa Tracker =

Website that simulates tracking Santa Claus

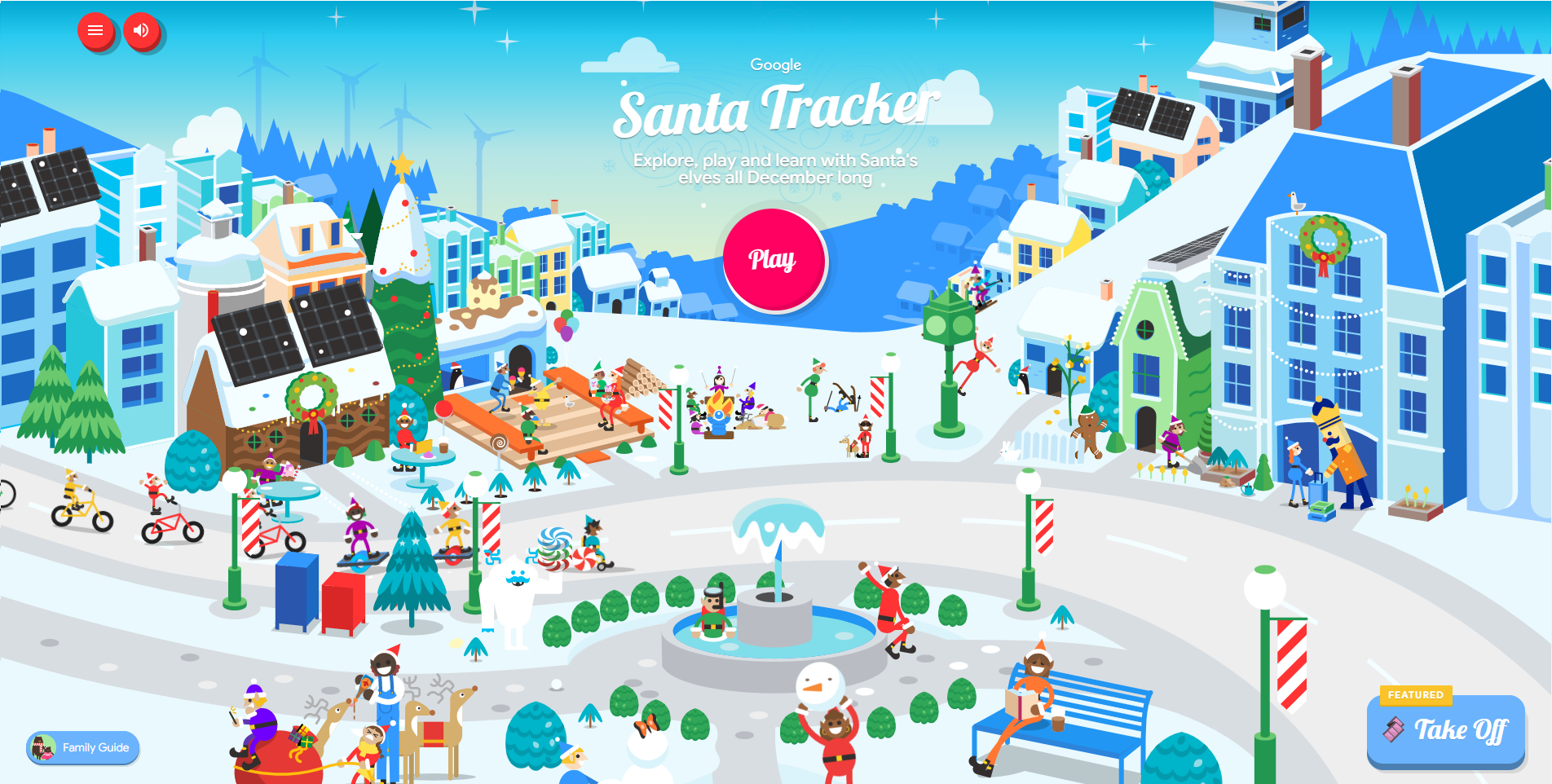
- Homepage on December 25, 2022, after Santa’s journey ended
- Website type: Santa tracking simulation, education and entertainment website
- Owner: Google, Inc.
- Website: santatracker.google.com
- Commercial: Yes
- Launched: December 1, 2004; 21 years ago
- Current status: Active
- Content license: Images/audio: CC BY 4.0 Other files: Apache License 2.0

Google Santa Tracker is an annual Christmas-themed entertainment website, launched on December 1, 2004 by Google, that simulates the tracking of the legendary character Santa Claus on Christmas Eve, using pre-determined location information. It also allows users to play, watch, and learn through various Christmas-themed activities. The site was inspired by NORAD Tracks Santa, which has operated since 1955.

== History ==
In early 2004, employees at Google stated that "they felt like it could be better for users to 'visualize' where Santa is currently at" in response to the NORAD Tracks Santa service. Later that year, Keyhole, Inc. was acquired by Google and they launched a paid service titled the "Keyhole Earth Viewer" (Google Earth's original name), where they would launch a service within the program titled the "Keyhole Santa Radar". The service received 25,000 viewers in its debut, and 250,000 the following year.

In 2007, NORAD and Google formally announced a partnership which would last for the next five years.

In 2015, Google announced that Google Santa Tracker is now open source through GitHub. This would mean that its users could install Google Santa Tracker as an APK file on Android devices. They also announced a handful of custom watch faces for Android Wear.

In 2018, the Santa Tracker added several features for students and educators. On December 4, 2018, the website fully launched a suite of games and lesson plans about coding basics and Christmas traditions around the world. The site also features information about non-profit organizations Khan Academy and Code.org. The 2018 Google Santa Tracker page also allowed users to use the Google Assistant to simulate a call to Santa or listen to a Christmas story. The website had 42.2 million visitors in December of that year. The website claimed that Santa had delivered 5.6 billion presents in 2019.

Between 2020 and 2021 during the COVID-19 pandemic, Santa, Mrs. Claus, and the elves were depicted to be wearing face masks. The face masks were removed in 2022.

== Website ==
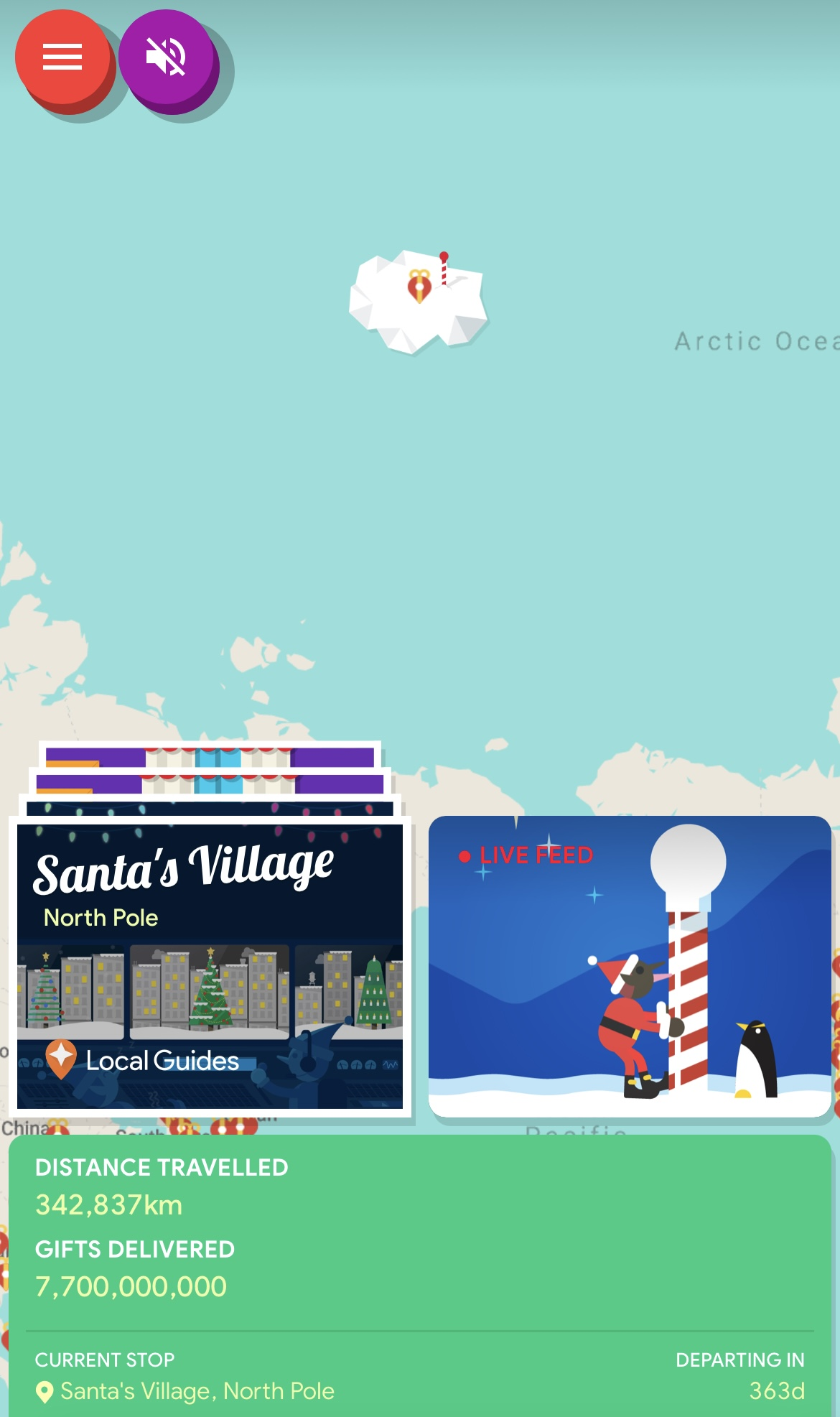
Google Santa Tracker after Santa's return to the North Pole (2022)

Every Christmas Eve, the Google Santa Tracker service begins to simulate tracking of Santa at about midnight in the furthest east time zone (10:00 a.m. UTC). The map shows Santa alternating between traveling and handing out presents in cities. Santa appears to travel approximately one time zone west per hour. Santa usually arrives at cities at late night (approx. 9:00 p.m. — 2:00 a.m.) in that city’s local time. Counters simulate to viewers how far Santa has traveled so far, or how long until he reaches the viewer's city on the map, depending on whether Santa has arrived yet. The tracker also displays the total number of presents delivered, which increases every second and reaches 7.7 billion by the end of the journey. Older versions of the tracker also included the distance to the viewer’s city, though this has since been removed. Santa is depicted as having helpers with him, including the standard reindeer and elves, along with penguins and a snowman.

For each city that Santa is said to visit, the website shows photos of that city from Google Local Guides, with Santa or his helpers in the foreground. Older versions of the tracker featured the first few paragraphs of the corresponding Wikipedia article, giving an overview of the city. The temperature of the city was also previously included, using data from The Weather Channel. Not every large city is visited; some large cities close to other large cities are skipped, while smaller cities that are far from any other populated place are occasionally featured. Even when Santa is traveling, the counter showing the total presents delivered increases, but at a slower rate than when Santa is in a city. This rate is faster or slower depending on the population of the city Santa is in.

The 2015 site also featured a "This Just In" section. This section features photos resembling those taken on social media websites, which feature Santa and his helpers partaking in various activities, including imitating the cover of Abbey Road, delivering presents, and taking selfies. Users can also watch animated sketches and play games. The latest update for Google Santa Tracker was in December 2025, which added a new game, “Snow Dodgeball,” and overhauled the “Railroad Ride” activity.
